= Economy of China =

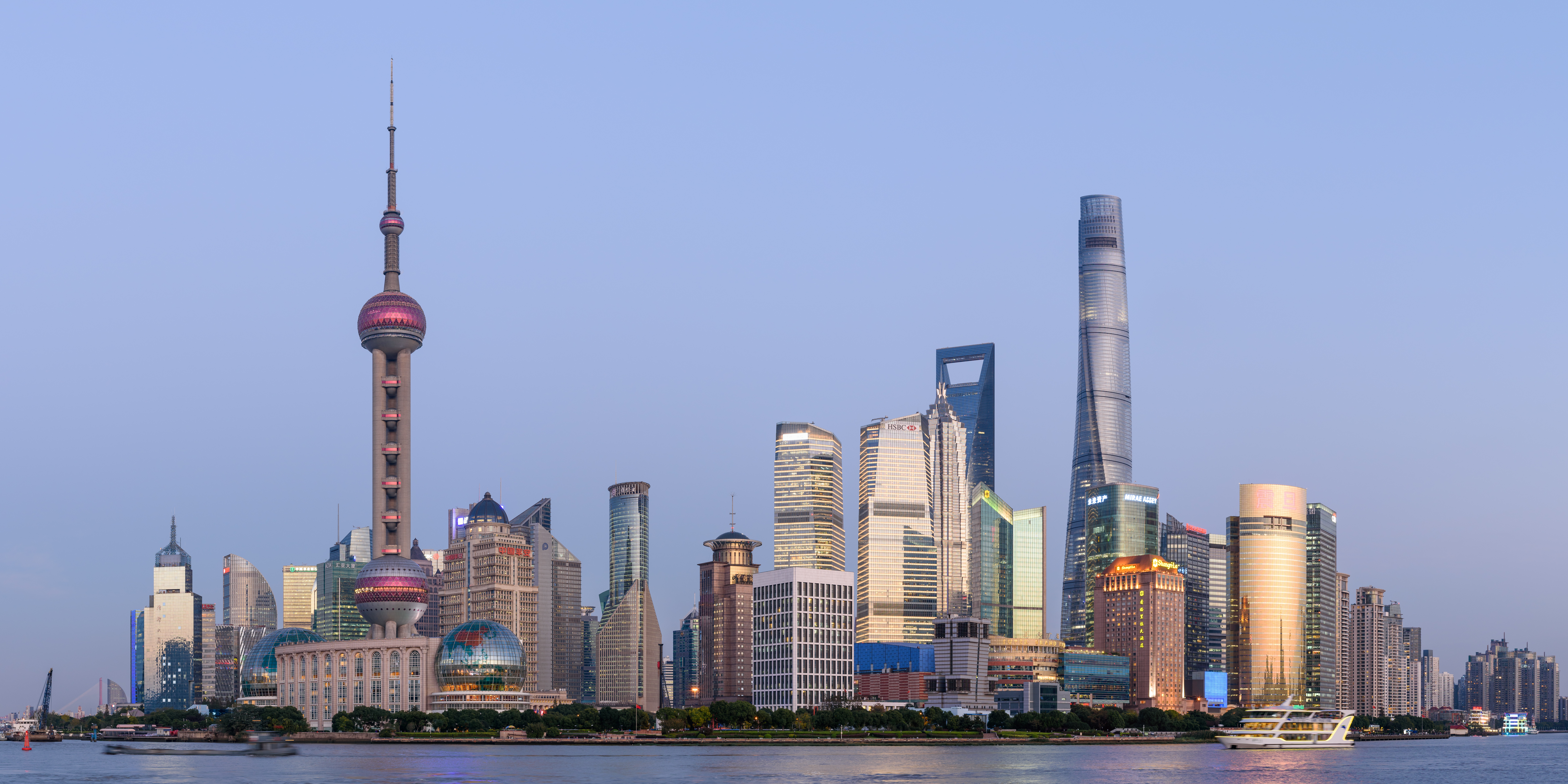
- Shanghai, the financial center of China
- Currency: Renminbi (CNY, ¥)
- Fiscal year: Calendar year
- Trade organizations: WTO, BRICS, SCO, APEC, RCEP, G20, G77 and others
- Country group: Developing country: Upper-middle income country; Newly industrialized country

Statistics
- Population: ▼1.405 billion (2025)
- GDP: ▲CN¥147.67 trillion (nominal; 2026): ▲$21.55 trillion (2026); ▲$44.55 trillion (PPP; 2026)
- GDP rank: 2nd (nominal; 2026); 1st (PPP; 2026)
- GDP growth: ▲4.5% (2026); ▲4.0% (2027f); ▲4.0% (2028f)
- GDP per capita: ▲$15,371 (nominal; 2026); ▲$31,786 (PPP; 2026)
- GDP per capita rank: 72nd (nominal; 2026); 73rd (PPP; 2026)
- GDP by sector: Agriculture: 6.7%; Industry: 35.6%; Services: 57.7%; (2025)
- GDP by component: Household consumption: 39.9%; Government consumption: 16.6%; Investment in fixed capital: 39.9%; Investment in inventories: 0.7%; Exports of goods and services: 18.9%; Imports of goods and services: -13.6%; Net exports: 2.8%; (2024)
- Inflation (CPI): ▼0.2% (2026)
- Population below national poverty line: ▼20% on less than $8.30/day (2026)
- Gini coefficient: ▲36.0 medium (2022) (Note: Higher income inequality is partly driven by unequal regional income distribution.)
- Human Development Index: ▲0.797 high (2023) (78th); ▲0.670 medium (2023) IHDI (66th)
- Corruption Perceptions Index: ▲43 out of 100 points (2025) (rank 76th)
- Labor force: ▲840,000,000 (2026) (1st); ▲75% employment rate (2026)
- Labor force by occupation: Agriculture: 22.2%; Industry: 28.9%; Services: 48.8%; (2024)
- Unemployment: ▼5.1% (December 2025); ▼16.5% youth unemployment (December 2025, 16 to 24 year olds)
- Average gross salary: US$ 1,586 (urban non-private sector); US$ 877 (urban private sector) per month (2025)
- Average net salary: US$ 1,119 (urban non-private sector); US$ 625 (urban private sector) per month (2025)
- Final consumption expenditure: ▲56.6% of GDP (2024)
- Gross capital formation: ▲40.6% of GDP (2024)
- Gross savings: ▲43.46% of GDP (2024)
- Yield curve: 10-Year Bond 1.8150% (March 2026)
- Purchasing Managers' Index: ▲50.30 Manufacturing (June 2026); ▲50.20 Non-Manufacturing (June 2026)
- Main industries: High-technology, mining and ore processing, iron, steel, aluminum, and other metals, renewable energy, coal; machine building; armaments; textiles and apparel; petroleum; cement; chemicals; fertilizer; consumer products (including footwear, toys, and electronics); defence, information technology, artificial intelligence, agribusiness, food processing; transportation equipment, including automobiles, railcars and locomotives, ships, aircraft; biotechnology, pharmaceutical, telecommunications equipment, space exploration, commercial space launch vehicles, satellites

External
- Exports: ▲$4.752 trillion (2026)
- Export goods: Agricultural products 2.2%; Fuels and mining products 2.4%; Manufacturers 74.3%; Others 0.1%
- Main export partners: ASEAN 17.6%; European Union 14.8%; United States 11.1%; Hong Kong 8.9%; Japan 4.2%; Others 43.4%
- Imports: ▲$3.476 trillion (2026)
- Import goods: Agricultural products 7.5%; Fuels and mining products 21.3%; Manufacturers 64.4%; Others 4.8%
- Main import partners: ASEAN 15.1%; European Union 10.0%; Taiwan 8.9%; South Korea 7.2%; Japan 6.4%; Others 52.4%
- FDI stock: ▲ Inward: $300 billion (2026); ▲ Outward: $288 billion (2026)
- Current account: ▲$729.100 billion (2025); ▲3.715% of GDP (2025)
- Gross external debt: ▲$2.115 trillion (2026)

Public finance
- Government debt: ▲¥103.987 trillion; ▲82.9% of GDP (2023)
- Foreign reserves: ▲$4.174 trillion (2026) (1st)
- Budget balance: -2.8% of GDP (2023)
- Revenue: ¥33.229 trillion 26.5% of GDP (2023)
- Spending: ¥42.140 trillion 33.6% of GDP (2023)
- Credit rating: Standard & Poor's: A+ (Domestic); A+ (Foreign); A+ (T&C Assessment); Outlook: Stable; Moody's: A1; Outlook: Stable; Fitch: A; Outlook: Stable
- All values, unless otherwise stated, are in US dollars.

The People's Republic of China (PRC) has a socialist market economy, incorporating industrial policies and strategic five-year plans. China has the world's second-largest economy by nominal GDP and since 2016 has been the world's largest economy when measured by purchasing power parity (PPP). (Note: GDP figures exclude Taiwan, and the special administrative regions of Hong Kong and Macau) China accounted for 19% of the global economy in 2025 in PPP terms, and around 17% in nominal terms in 2025. The developing economy consists of state-owned enterprises (SOEs) and mixed-ownership enterprises, as well as a large domestic private sector which contribute approximately 60% of the GDP, 80% of urban employment and 90% of new jobs.

China is the world's largest manufacturing industrial economy and exporter of goods. China is widely regarded as the "powerhouse of manufacturing", "the factory of the world" and the world's "manufacturing superpower". Its production exceeds that of the nine next largest manufacturers combined. Exports as a percentage of GDP are around 20%. China is the largest trading nation in the world and plays a prominent role in international trade. Manufacturing has been transitioning toward high-tech industries such as electric vehicles, renewable energy, telecommunications and IT equipment, and services has also grown as a percentage of GDP. China is the world's largest high technology exporter. As of 2023, the country spends around 2.6% of GDP to advance research and development across various sectors of the economy. It is also the world's second-largest importer of goods. China is a net importer of services products.

China has a network of free trade agreements with several countries, though Regional Comprehensive Economic Partnership (RCEP) accounts for the bulk of its trade integration. Of the world's 500 largest companies, 142 are headquartered in China. It has three of the world's top ten most competitive financial centers and three of the world's ten largest stock exchanges (both by market capitalization and by trade volume). China has the second-largest financial assets in the world, valued at $39.3 trillion as of 2025. China is one of the largest recipient of foreign direct investment (FDI) in the world as of 2025, receiving inflows of $107 billion. It has the third largest outbound FDI, at US$192.20 billion for 2024. China's economic growth has dealt with a range of challenges in the 2020s due to a property crisis.

With 773 million workers, the Chinese labor force is the world's largest as of 2024, although it is shrinking due to the rapidly aging population. In March 2026, Forbes estimated China ranked second in the world, after the U.S., in total number of billionaires and total number of millionaires, with 539 Chinese billionaires, while Hurun Global Rich List estimated it ranked first, with 1,110 billionaires. China also has 5.3 million millionaires as of 2026, second highest after the U.S. Public social expenditure in China was around 10% of GDP.

== History ==
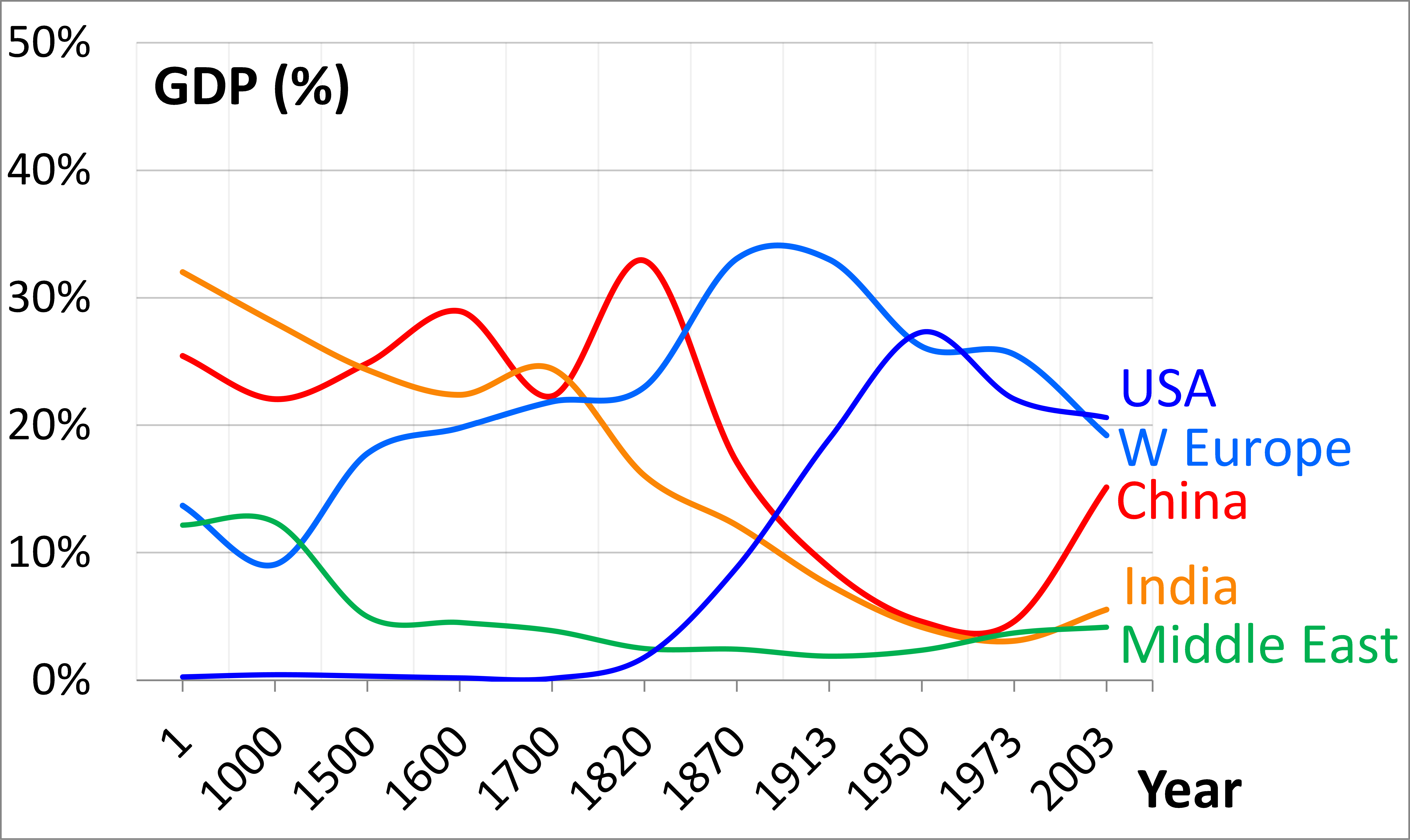
The global contribution to world's GDP by major economies from 1 CE to 2003 CE according to Angus Maddison's estimates. Up until the 18th century, China and India were the two largest economies by GDP output.

GDP per capita in China from 1850 to 2022

Historically, China was one of the world's foremost economic powers for most of the two millennia of Pax Sinica, spanning from the 1st until the 19th century. China accounted for around one-quarter to one-third of global GDP until the mid-1800s. China's share of global GDP was one-third in 1820 as the Industrial Revolution was beginning in Great Britain. China's GDP in 1820 was six times as large as Britain's, the largest economy in Europe, and almost twenty times the GDP of the nascent United States.

At the end of the Chinese Civil War, the economy was devastated. As the defeated Kuomintang retreated to Taiwan, they stripped mainland China of liquid assets, including gold, silver, and the country's dollar reserves. By the time the Kuomintang (KMT) was defeated, commerce had been destroyed, the national currency rendered valueless, and the economy reduced to barter.

The development of the People's Republic of China (PRC) from one of the poorest countries to one of the largest economies was the quickest of any country. From 1949 until the reform and opening up in 1978, the country maintained a self-sufficient, state-led economy focused on rapid industrialization, while substantial market activity remained underground. The period of the Great Leap Forward and the Great Chinese Famine negatively impacted the economy. Economic reforms began under Deng Xiaoping. China subsequently became the world's fastest-growing major economy, with growth rates averaging 10% over 30 years. Many scholars consider the Chinese economic model as an example of authoritarian capitalism, state capitalism, or party-state capitalism under the general secretaryship of Xi Jinping. At the same time, scholars have also emphasized differences across reform-era leaderships, especially between the Deng Xiaoping and Xi Jinping era. Another inflection point is the COVID-19 pandemic, which had an enduring impact on the Chinese economy. Yuen Yuen Ang characterizes the post-pandemic period as "China's economic paradox:" a period of rapid technological catch-up paired with a broad growth slowdown.

China brought more people out of extreme poverty than any other country in history. Between 1978 and 2018, China reduced extreme poverty by 800 million people. The percentage of the population living in extreme poverty decreased from 88.1% to 0.2% between 1981 and 2019. Its current account surplus increased by a factor of 53 between 1982 and 2021, growing from $5.67 billion to $317 billion.

During this time, China became an industrial powerhouse, moving beyond initial successes in low-wage sectors like clothing and footwear to the production of computers, pharmaceuticals, and automobiles. China's factories generated $3.7 trillion in real manufacturing value added, more than the US, South Korea, Germany, the UK and France combined. China's manufacturing sector benefits from one of the world's largest domestic markets, immense manufacturing scale, and highly developed manufacturing supply chains. It also has two of the global top 5 science and technology clusters—Shenzhen-Hong Kong-Guangzhou and Beijing, in the 2nd and 3rd spots respectively—which is more than any other country.

China has sustained growth due to export relations, its manufacturing sector, and low-wage workers. It was the only major world economy to experience GDP expansion in 2020, with a growth rate of 2.3%. However, the country posted one of its worst economic performances in decades in 2022 due to the COVID-19 pandemic. In 2023, the International Monetary Fund (IMF) predicted that China would continue to be one of the fastest growing major economies. China's economy is both a contributor to rising global greenhouse gas (GHG) emissions and severely affected by the adverse impacts of climate change, although its per capita emissions remain much lower than developed economies like the United States.

== Regional economies ==
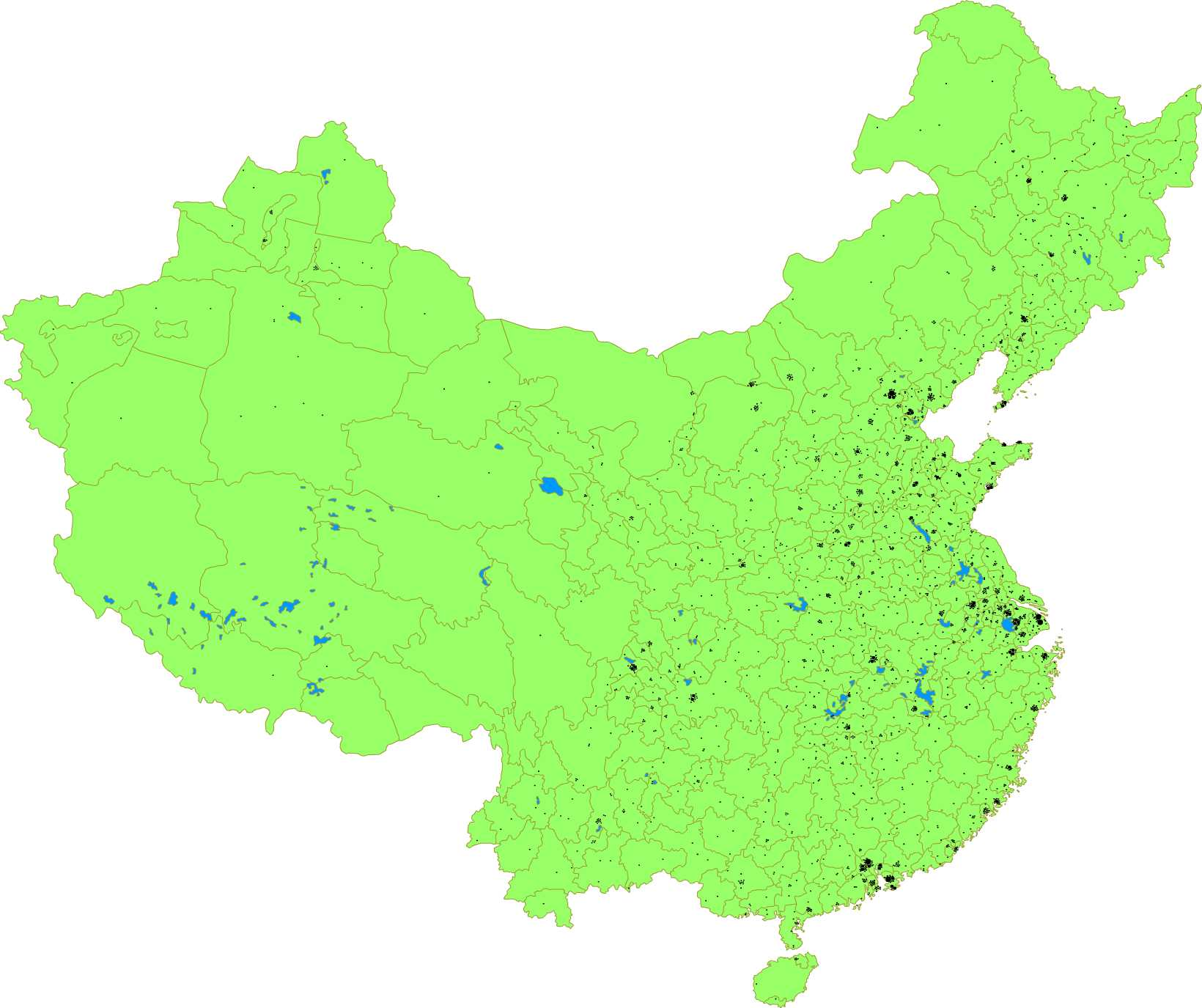
Distribution of GDP in mainland China

China's unequal transportation system, combined with important differences in the availability of natural and human resources and in industrial infrastructure, has produced significant variations in the regional economies of China. The economic development of Shenzhen has caused the city to be referred to as the world's next Silicon Valley.

Economic development has generally been more rapid in coastal provinces than in the interior and there are large disparities in per capita income between regions. The three wealthiest regions are the Yangtze Delta in East China; the Pearl River Delta in South China; and Jing-Jin-Ji region in North China. It is the rapid development of these areas that is expected to have the most significant effect on the Asian regional economy as a whole and Chinese government policy is designed to remove the obstacles to accelerated growth in these wealthier regions. By 2035, China's four cities (Shanghai, Beijing, Guangzhou and Shenzhen) are projected to be among the global top ten largest cities by nominal GDP according to a report by Oxford Economics.

=== GDP by administrative division ===
List of 31 provinces in mainland China by Nominal GDP in 2022 (billions of GDP)
provinces	CN¥	US$	share (%)
China (mainland)	141,020.72	19,700.70	100
Guangdong	13,911.86	2,119.67	10.67
Jiangsu	12,287.56	1,826.85	10.15
Shandong	8,743.51	1,299.94	7.22
Zhejiang	7,771.54	1,155.43	6.42
Henan	6,134.51	912.05	5.07
Sichuan	5,749.8	843.73	4.69
Hubei	5,373.49	798.90	4.44
Fujian	5,310.99	789.61	4.39
Hunan	4,867.04	723.61	4.02
Anhui	4,504.50	669.70	3.72
Shanghai	4,465.28	663.87	3.69
Hebei	4,237.04	629.94	3.50
Beijing	4,161.10	618.65	3.44
Shaanxi	3,277.27	487.25	2.71
Jiangxi	3,207.47	476.87	2.65
Chongqing	2,912.90	433.07	2.41
Liaoning	2,897.51	430.79	2.39
Yunnan	2,895.42	430.48	2.39
Guangxi	2,630.09	391.03	2.17
Shanxi	2,564.26	381.24	2.12
Inner Mongolia	2,315.87	344.31	1.91
Guizhou	2,016.46	299.80	1.67
Xinjiang	1,774.13	263.77	1.47
Tianjin	1,631.13	242.51	1.35
Heilongjiang	1,590.10	236.41	1.31
Jilin	1,307.02	194.32	1.08
Gansu	1,120.16	166.54	0.93
Hainan	681.82	101.37	0.56
Ningxia	506.96	75.37	0.42
Qinghai	361.01	53.67	0.30
Tibet	213.26	31.71	0.18

=== Provinces ===
- Economy of Anhui
- Economy of Fujian
- Economy of Gansu
- Economy of Guangdong
- Economy of Guizhou
- Economy of Hainan
- Economy of Hebei
- Economy of Heilongjiang
- Economy of Henan
- Economy of Hubei
- Economy of Hunan
- Economy of Jiangsu
- Economy of Jiangxi
- Economy of Jilin
- Economy of Liaoning
- Economy of Qinghai
- Economy of Shaanxi
- Economy of Shandong
- Economy of Shanxi
- Economy of Sichuan
- Economy of Yunnan
- Economy of Zhejiang

=== Autonomous regions ===
- Economy of Guangxi
- Economy of Inner Mongolia
- Economy of Ningxia
- Economy of Tibet
- Economy of Xinjiang

=== Municipalities ===
- Economy of Beijing
- Economy of Chongqing
- Economy of Shanghai
- Economy of Tianjin

=== Hong Kong and Macau ===
In accordance with the one country, two systems policy, the economies of the former British colony of Hong Kong and Portuguese colony of Macau formally preserve a capitalist system separate from mainland China.

=== Regional development ===
Eastern China
"Rise of Central China"
"Revitalize Northeast China"
"China Western Development"

These strategies are aimed at the relatively underdeveloped regions of China in an attempt to address unequal development:

- China Western Development, designed to increase the economic situation of the western provinces through investment and development of natural resources.
- Revitalize Northeast China, to rejuvenate the industrial bases in Northeast China. It covers the three provinces of Heilongjiang, Jilin, and Liaoning, as well as the five eastern prefectures of Inner Mongolia.
- Rise of Central China Plan, to accelerate the development of its central regions. It covers six provinces: Shanxi, Henan, Anhui, Hubei, Hunan, and Jiangxi.
- Third Front of the Cold War period, which focused on the southwestern provinces.

== Government ==
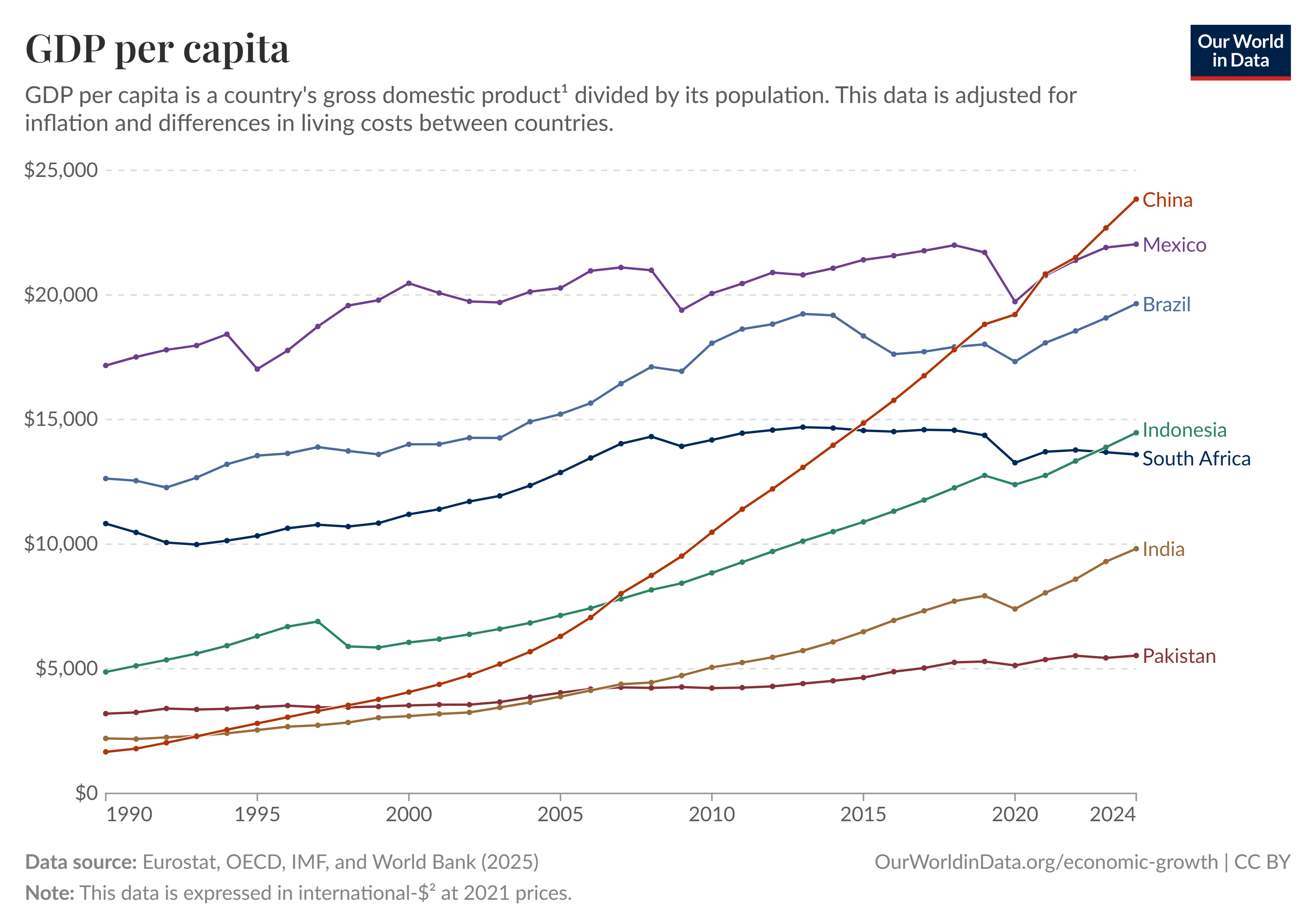
China and other major developing economies by GDP per capita at purchasing-power parity (1990–2024) as the rapid economic growth of China is readily apparent

China engages in state-led investment and industrial policy with a significant state-owned enterprise sector. The Chinese Communist Party (CCP) describes China's economic system as the socialist market economy. To guide economic development, the Chinese central government adopts five-year plans that detail its economic priorities and essential policies. The fifteenth five-year plan (2026–2030) is currently being implemented, following the fourteenth five-year plan (2021-2025) which placed an emphasis on consumption-driven growth and technological self-sufficiency while China transitions from being an upper middle-income economy to a high-income economy.

The public sector plays a central role in China's economy. In Rural China Takes Off (1999), Jean Oi identified reform-era China as a local variety of developmental states, with "local governments in the lead role of the development process." Yuen Yuen Ang's How China Escaped the Poverty Trap (2016) characterized the role of the state in Chinese development as "directed improvisation," a mixture of top-down direction by the central government and bottom-up improvisation among local governments, producing a variety of subnational coevolutionary paths and distinct regional models, rather than a single, fixed China model.

Currently, China's development goals are to achieve the Two Centenaries, namely the material goal of China becoming a moderately prosperous society in all respects by 2021 and the modernization goal of China becoming a "strong, democratic, civilized, harmonious and modern socialist country" by 2049, the 100th anniversary of the founding of the People's Republic. China retains state control over the commanding heights of the economy in key industries like infrastructure, telecommunications, and finance despite significant marketization of the economy since reform and opening up. Specific mechanisms implementing government control of the commanding heights of the economy include public property rights, pervasive administrative involvement, and CCP supervision of senior managers.

The state is more likely to intervene in areas where the prices of goods and services are socially and politically sensitive. For example, China's government intervenes more actively in the commercial banking sector than in private equity, where significantly fewer households participate. The state's involvement in the allocation of finance, contracts, and resources facilitates Chinese government efforts to minimize the effects of market volatility.

Local governments' level of authority and autonomy in economic decision-making is high, and they have played a major role in national economic development. Local governments may also offer incentives or subsidies to attract business. One common tax incentive is "three tax-free and three half-tax", through which businesses can be allowed not to pay corporate income tax for their first three years of operation, and pay a half rate for the next three years.

=== State-owned enterprises ===
China's SOEs perform functions that benefit the state. Academic Wendy Leutert writes, "They contribute to central and local governments revenues through dividends and taxes, support urban employment, keep key input prices low, channel capital towards targeted industries and technologies, support sub-national redistribution to poorer interior and western provinces, and aid the state's response to natural disasters, financial crises and social instability." SOE top management personnel is controlled by the CCP's Organization Department.

Almost 867,000 enterprises in China have a degree of state ownership, according to Franklin Allen of Imperial College London. As of 2017, China has more SOEs than any other country, and the most SOEs among large national companies. State-owned enterprises accounted for over 60% of China's market capitalization in 2019 and generated 40% of China's GDP of US$15.98 trillion dollars (101.36 trillion yuan) in 2020, with domestic and foreign private businesses and investment accounting for the remaining 60%. As of the end of 2019, the total assets of all China's SOEs, including those operating in the financial sector, reached US$58.97 trillion In 2015. Ninety-one (91) of these SOEs belong to the 2020 Fortune Global 500 companies. As of 2025, private firms represent 40% of the country's top-100 listed firms, mixed-ownership firms represent 15%, while state-owned enterprises represent 45%, according to the Peterson Institute for International Economics.

=== Disputes over economic data ===
There exist disputes over reliability of official economic data. Foreign and some Chinese sources have claimed that official Chinese government statistics overstate China's economic growth. However, several Western academics and institutions have stated that China's economic growth is higher than indicated by official figures. Others, such as the Economist Intelligence Unit, state that while there's evidence China's GDP data is "smoothed", they believe that China's nominal and real GDP data are broadly accurate. Still, others state that reported GDP growth is irreconcilable with data coming out of China. According to 2007 documents obtained by WikiLeaks, Liaoning Party Secretary and future Premier Li Keqiang said he is far from confident in the country's GDP estimates, calling them "man-made" and unreliable and that data releases, especially the GDP numbers, should be used "for reference only". In its place, he developed the Li Keqiang index as an alternative measurement of Chinese economic performance that uses three variables he preferred. After meeting Alibaba's Jack Ma in February in March 2025, China announced a 5 percent growth target at its annual sessions, despite ongoing trade tensions with the United States. The Washington Post reports that China's two annual political meetings, hosted by the National People's Congress and the Chinese People's Political Consultative Conference, set a growth target of "around 5 percent" for 2025 despite rising trade tensions with the United States, signaling Beijing's certainty in its recovery. Leaders underlined boosting consumption, supporting private-sector innovation, and growing fiscal tools such as a greater deficit ratio and special bonds to stabilize growth. Officials pledged to support exporters, draw foreign investment, and promote technological self-reliance, while encouraging private entrepreneurship. The sessions presented China as a global stabilizer and warned of countermeasures against trade barriers, showing a pragmatic, growth-oriented approach throughout geopolitical challenges.

Chinese provinces and cities have long been suspected of cooking their numbers, with the focus on local government officials, whose performance is often assessed based on how well their respective economies have performed. Local governments have come under increased scrutiny over economic data, with CCP general secretary Xi Jinping stating that economic data forgery "not only hurt our judgment of the economic situation, but also seriously undermined the Communist Party's ideas and truth-seeking style".

Satellite measurements of light pollution are used by some analysts to model Chinese economic growth and suggest growth rate numbers in Chinese official data are more reliable, though are likely to be smoothed. According to an article by the Federal Reserve Bank of St. Louis, China's official statistics are of a high quality compared to other developing, middle-income and low-income countries. In 2016, China was at the 83rd percentile of middle and low-income countries, up from the 38th percentile in 2004. A study by the Federal Reserve Bank of San Francisco found that China's official GDP statistics are "significantly and positively correlated" with externally verifiable measures of economic activity such as import and export data from China's trade partners, suggesting that China's economic growth was no slower than the official figures indicated.

Several Western academics and institutions have supported the claim that China's economy is likely to be underestimated. A paper by the US-based National Bureau of Economic Research claimed that China's economic growth may be higher than what is reported by official statistics. An article by Hunter Clarka, Maxim Pinkovskiya and Xavier Sala-i-Martin published by Science Direct from Elsevier in 2018 employs an innovative method of satellite-recorded nighttime lights, which the authors claim to be a best-unbiased predictor of the economic growth in Chinese cities. The results suggest that the Chinese economic growth rate is higher than the official reported data.

The study by Daniel H. Rosen and Beibei Bao, published by the Center for Strategic and International Studies in 2015, showed that GDP in 2008 was actually 13–16 percent bigger than the official data, while 2013 GDP was accurately at $10.5 trillion rather than the official figure at $9.5 trillion. According to a research conducted by Arvind Subramanian, a former economist at the International Money Fund (IMF) and a senior fellow at the Peterson Institute for International Economics, the size of the Chinese economy by Purchasing Power Parity in 2010 was about $14.8 trillion rather than an official estimate at $10.1 trillion by IMF, meaning that China's GDP was underestimated by 47 percent.

According to a 2019 research paper published by the Brookings Institution adjusting the historical GDP time series using value-added tax data, which the authors said are "highly resistant to fraud and tampering", China's economic growth may have been overstated by 1.7 percent each year between 2008 and 2016, meaning that the government may have been overstating the size of the Chinese economy by 12–16 percent in 2016.

The Rhodium Group, an independent research think tank, has consistently questioned the accuracy of China's official GDP figures, estimating actual GDP growth in 2024 to be between 2.4% and 2.8%, significantly lower than the official claim of 4.8%. As observers raised their skepticism of the Chinese economy, in 2025, the United States Federal Reserve conducted economic research on whether China was growing at its 5% growth target. They concluded that Chinese official figures were not overstated, with alternative indicators, including trade, consumption, and the property sector data, closely aligned with the official GDP figure. China's strong supply-side economy for international trade and self-reliance offsets the weakness in consumption after the pandemic.

China has shifted its approach to managing the private sector, moving from unpredictable crackdowns to a more stable, regulated system. In 2025, Xi Jinping signaled a new direction by meeting with Alibaba's Jack Ma, emphasizing the role of private firms in China's technological growth. The meeting with Alibaba's Jack Ma and other private sector leaders signaled a warmer stance towards China's technology firms after many years of regulatory pressure. It also indicated that there was a warmer stance toward private tech and AI firms after Alibaba and Ant Group were previously under scrutiny. It now seemed that analysts saw Beijing as wanting to promote domestic private tech firms and broader AI development to compete with the rest of the world. The meeting, which came just weeks before the unveiling of China's DeepSeek's latest AI model, which provided low-cost alternatives to the US alternatives. Legal protections for entrepreneurs have been codified, while the Chinese Communist Party has increased its presence in companies through party cells and "golden shares." This new model seeks to balance innovation with state control, particularly in high-tech sectors like AI and semiconductors.

=== National debt ===
In 2022, China's total government debt was approximately CN¥ 94 trillion (US$ 14 trillion), or 77.1% of GDP. In 2014, many analysts expressed concern over the overall size of China's government debt. At the end of 2014, the International Monetary Fund reported that China's general government gross debt-to-GDP ratio was 41.44 percent. In 2015, a report by the International Monetary Fund concluded that China's public debt is relatively low "and on a stable path in all standard stress tests except for the scenario with contingent liability shocks", such as "a large-scale bank recapitalization or financial system bailout to deal, for example, with a potential rise in NPLs from deleveraging". Per the State Administration of Foreign Exchange's 2019 balance of payments report, the external debt balance of the entire Chinese government at year end was 2% of GDP.

Chinese authorities have dismissed analysts' worries, insisting "the country still has room to increase government debt". Former Fed Chairman Ben Bernanke, earlier in 2016, commented that "the ... debt pile facing China [is] an 'internal' problem", given the majority of the borrowings was issued in local currency. A 2019 survey by the OECD found that China's corporate debt is higher than other major countries. Shadow banking has risen in China, posing risks to the financial system. Off-the-books debt is a grey area, but estimates place the amount for local governments alone as high as $9 trillion or 63 trillion yuan, up from estimates of around 30 trillion yuan in 2020.

=== Taxation, regulatory environment and government revenues ===
Though China's economy has expanded rapidly, its regulatory environment has not kept pace. Since Deng Xiaoping's open market reforms, the growth of new businesses has outpaced the government's ability to regulate them. This has created a situation where businesses, faced with mounting competition and poor oversight, take drastic measures to increase profit margins, often at the expense of consumer safety. This issue became more prominent in 2007, with a number of restrictions being placed on problematic Chinese exports by the United States.

==== Anti-monopoly and competition law ====
The Chinese technology sector has been characterized as being dominated by few, larger entities including Ant Group and Tencent. There have been attempts by the Xi Jinping Administration to enforce economic competition rules, and probes into Alibaba and Tencent have been launched by Chinese economic regulators.

The crackdown on tech giants and internet companies during the 2020–2021 Xi Jinping Administration reform spree was followed with calls by the Politburo against monopolistic practices by commercial retail giants like Alibaba. In August 2024 China's market regulator ended its antitrust review of Alibaba Group Holding after fining them in 2021. The company was fined for US$2.8 billion in 2021. The three years of regulatory scrutiny compelled Alibaba to comply with the antitrust authority. Studies showed that the cumulative effects of the investigation on Alibaba resulted in 17% to 25% decline in abnormal stock returns. In March 2021, Xi stated that China would strengthen its antitrust enforcement in an effort to advance what he described as the healthy and sustainable development of the platform economy. Two major institutional changes resulted. In November 2021, China upgraded the bureaucratic status of the State Administration for Market Regulation's antitrust bureau. In June 2022, it made major amendments to the Anti-Monopoly Law, including explicit language, focused on regulation of the platform economy.

=== Corruption ===
Corruption has been a significant problem in the People's Republic of China. Like other socialist economies that have undertaken economic reforms, such as post-Soviet Eastern Europe and Central Asia, reform-era China has experienced increasing levels of corruption. In Transparency International's 2025 Corruption Perceptions Index (CPI), China ranked 76th out of 182 countries, with a score of 43 out of 100. The Unbundled Corruption Index (UCI), which distinguishes among different types of corruption, shows that when compared to other developing countries, corruption in China is dominated by "access money" (elite exchanges of power and wealth), rather than petty bribery or extortion.

Public surveys on the mainland since the late 1980s have shown that corruption is among the top concerns of the general public. According to Yan Sun, Associate Professor of Political Science at the City University of New York, it was cadre corruption, rather than a demand for democracy as such, that lay at the root of the social dissatisfaction that led to the 1989 Tiananmen Square protests and massacre. Corruption undermines the legitimacy of the authoritarian Chinese Communist Party (CCP) government, adds to economic inequality, undermines the environment, and fuels social unrest.

Since the 1989 Tiananmen Square protests and massacre, corruption has not slowed as a result of greater economic freedom, but instead has grown more entrenched and severe in its character and scope. In popular perception, there are more dishonest CCP officials than honest ones, a reversal of the views held in the first decade of the reform and opening up period of the 1980s. Chinese political scientist Minxin Pei argued in 2007 that failure to contain widespread corruption is among the most serious threats to China's future economic and political stability. He estimated that year that bribery, kickbacks, theft, and the waste of public funds cost at least three percent of GDP.

By the 2000s and early 2010s, corruption had grown to be an extensive problem, impacting government administration, armed forces, law enforcement, healthcare and education. CCP cadre corruption in China has been subject to significant media attention since CCP General Secretary Xi Jinping announced his anti-corruption campaign following the CCP's 18th National Congress, which was held in November 2012. Many high-ranking government and military officials have been found guilty of corruption because of this campaign. According to analysts Neil Thomas and Wang Shengyu, the campaign also led to an overall decrease in petty bribery and open embezzlement. According to the World Bank's Worldwide Governance Indicators, China has advanced under Xi on metrics of "control of corruption" and "government effectiveness", moving from around the same as other upper-middle-income countries to well above the average. Other academics have found that recent anti-corruption campaigns have increased the value of personal connections and driven a rise in other forms of corruption. Writing in 2024, academic Lan Xiaohuan states that China exhibits relatively little petty corruption compared with other developing countries.

== Data ==
The following table shows the main economic indicators in 1980–2024 (with IMF staff estimates in 2025–2029). Inflation below 5% is in green.

Year	GDP (in bn. US$PPP)	GDP per capita (in US$ PPP)	GDP (in bn. US$nominal)	GDP per capita (in US$ nominal)	GDP growth (real)	Inflation rate (in Percent)	Unemployment (in Percent)	Government debt (in % of GDP)
1980	271.1	275	303.0	307	▲7.9%	n/a	n/a	n/a
1981	▲311.8	▲312	▼288.7	▼288	▲5.1%	▲2.5%	n/a	n/a
1982	▲360.9	▲355	▼284.6	▼280	▲9.0%	▲2.0%	n/a	n/a
1983	▲415.6	▲403	▲305.4	▲297	▲10.8%	▲2.0%	n/a	n/a
1984	▲496.0	▲475	▲314.2	▲301	▲15.2%	▲2.7%	n/a	n/a
1985	▲580.8	▲549	▼310.1	▼293	▲13.5%	▲9.3%	n/a	n/a
1986	▲645.2	▲600	▼300.9	▼280	▲8.9%	▲6.5%	n/a	n/a
1987	▲738.5	▲676	▲327.7	▲300	▲11.7%	▲7.3%	n/a	n/a
1988	▲850.2	▲766	▲408.7	▲368	▲11.2%	▲18.8%	n/a	n/a
1989	▲920.7	▲817	▲458.2	▲407	▲4.2%	▲18.0%	n/a	n/a
1990	▲992.2	▲868	▼396.6	▼347	▲3.9%	▲3.3%	n/a	n/a
1991	▲1,118.1	▲965	▲413.2	▲357	▲9.0%	▲3.6%	n/a	n/a
1992	▲1,306.8	▲1,115	▲492.1	▲420	▲14.3%	▲6.4%	n/a	n/a
1993	▲1,523.5	▲1,285	▲617.4	▲521	▲13.9%	▲14.6%	n/a	n/a
1994	▲1,758.8	▲1,467	▼561.7	▼469	▲13.0%	▲24.3%	n/a	n/a
1995	▲1,992.6	▲1,645	▲731.0	▲604	▲11.0%	▲16.8%	n/a	21.6%
1996	▲2,230.4	▲1,822	▲860.5	▲703	▲9.9%	▲8.3%	n/a	▼21.4%
1997	▲2,478.6	▲2,005	▲958.0	▲775	▲9.2%	▲2.8%	n/a	▼20.6%
1998	▲2,703.4	▲2,167	▲1,024.2	▲821	▲7.9%	▼-0.8%	n/a	▲20.7%
1999	▲2,952.2	▲2,347	▲1,088.3	▲865	▲7.7%	▼-1.4%	n/a	▲21.9%
2000	▲3,274.9	▲2,584	▲1,205.5	▲951	▲8.5%	▲0.3%	n/a	▲23.0%
2001	▲3,627.2	▲2,842	▲1,333.6	▲1,045	▲8.3%	▲0.7%	n/a	▲24.6%
2002	▲4,019.3	▲3,129	▲1,465.8	▲1,141	▲9.1%	▼-0.8%	n/a	▲25.9%
2003	▲4,509.4	▲3,490	▲1,657.0	▲1,282	▲10.0%	▲1.2%	n/a	▲26.8%
2004	▲5,099.0	▲3,923	▲1,949.4	▲1,500	▲10.1%	▲3.9%	n/a	▼26.4%
2005	▲5,857.9	▲4,480	▲2,290.0	▲1,751	▲11.4%	▲1.8%	n/a	▼26.3%
2006	▲6,806.0	▲5,178	▲2,754.1	▲2,095	▲12.7%	▲1.5%	n/a	▲25.6%
2007	▲7,986.3	▲6,044	▲3,555.7	▲2,691	▲14.2%	▲4.8%	n/a	▲29.2%
2008	▲8,921.0	▲6,718	▲4,577.3	▲3,447	▲9.6%	▲5.8%	n/a	▼27.2%
2009	▲9,823.9	▲7,361	▲5,089.0	▲3,813	▲9.4%	▼-0.7%	n/a	▲34.6%
2010	▲11,225.1	▲8,371	▲6,138.8	▲4,578	▲10.6%	▲3.3%	n/a	▼33.9%
2011	▲12,539.4	▲9,294	▲7,628.3	▲5,654	▲9.6%	▲5.4%	n/a	▼33.8%
2012	▲13,509.4	▲10,135	▲8,682.5	▲6,388	▲7.8%	▲2.6%	n/a	▲34.4%
2013	▲13,775.337	▲11,043	▲9,787.5	▲7,158	▲7.8%	▲2.6%	n/a	▲37.0%
2014	▲16,512.1	▲11,996	▲10,702.4	▲7,775	▲7.4%	▲2.0%	n/a	▲40.0%
2015	▲17,835.078	▲12,894	▲11,305.5	▲8,173	▲7.0%	▲1.4%	n/a	▲41.5%
2016	▲19,224.4	▲13,808	▲11,452.9	▲8,225	▲6.8%	▲2.0%	n/a	▲50.7%
2017	▲20,917.2	▲14,940	▲12,516.1	▲8,939	▲6.9%	▲1.6%	5.0%	▲55.0%
2018	▲22,803.2	▲16,225	▲14,107.9	▲10,038	▲6.7%	▲2.1%	▼4.9%	▲56.7%
2019	▲24,798.5	▲17,587	▲14,593.4	▲10,349	▲6.0%	▲2.9%	▲5.2%	▲60.4%
2020	▲25,960.9	▲18,384	▲15,593.6	▲10,700	▲2.2%	▲2.5%	▲5.6%	▲70.2%
2021	▲29,420.3	▲20,827	▲18,183.5	▲12,872	▲8.4%	▲0.9%	▼5.1%	▲71.9%
2022	▲32,493.5	▲23,017	▲18,337.9	▲12,989	▲3.0%	▲2.0%	▲5.6%	▲77.4%
2023	▲35,507.5	▲25,189	▲18,366,9	▲13,029	▲5.4%	▲0.2%	▼5.2%	▲84.4%
2024	▲38,209.5	▲27,132	▲18,945.1	▲13,453	▲5.0%	▲0.4%	▼5.1%	▲90.1%
2025e	▲41,241.9	▲29,352	▲19,626.2	▲13,968	▲5.0%	▲1.7%	5.1%	▲93.8%
2026e	▲44,295.4	▲31,596	▲20,851.5	▲14,874	▲4.1%	▲2.0%	5.1%	▲97.7%
2027e	▲47,093.756	▲33,669	▲22,050.8	▲15,692	▲3.6%	▲2.0%	5.1%	▲102.1%
2028e	▲49,781.4	▲35,681	▲23,319.7	▲16,617	▲3.4%	▲2.0%	5.1%	▲106.6%
2029e	▲52,523.7	▲37,750	▲24,589.7	▲17,546	▲3.3%	▲2.0%	5.1%	▲111.1%

=== Inflation ===
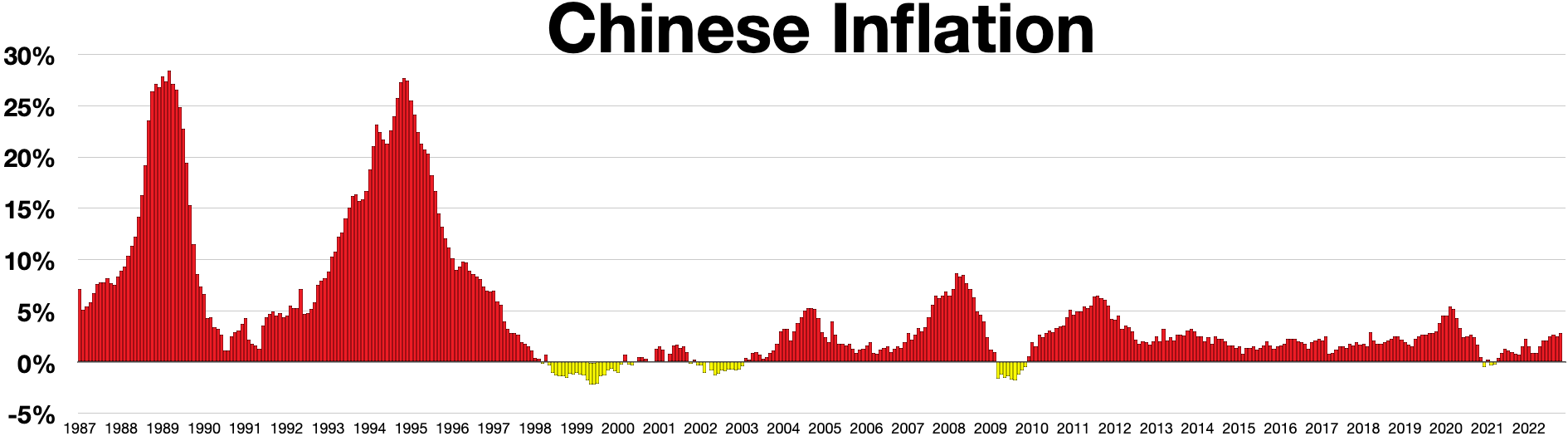
Chinese inflation 1987–2022

As of 2025, China had experienced three inflation peaks: 1987–1989 (18.8%), 1993–1996 (peaking at 24%), and 2008 (8.2%).

According to China's National Bureau of Statistics (NBS), the producer price index rose by 2.8 percent in April 2026 compared with the same month a year earlier. The increase was attributed to rising global energy and raw material prices driven by the war in the Middle East.

=== Investment cycles ===
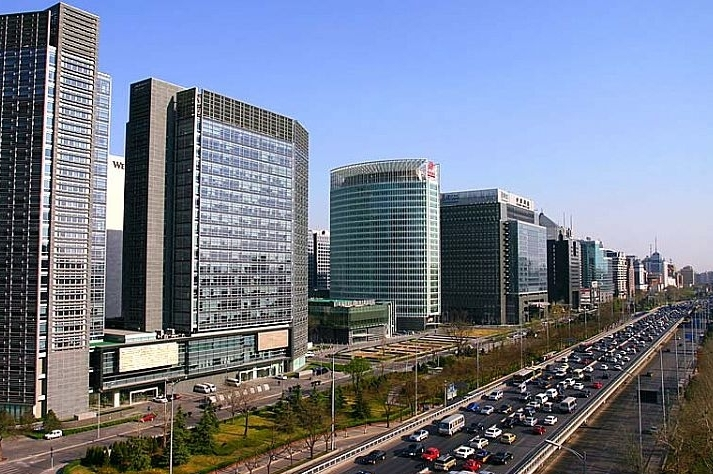
Beijing Financial Street

Chinese investment has always been highly cyclical.

In China, the majority of investment is carried out by entities that are at least partially state-owned. Most of these are under the control of local governments. Thus, booms are primarily the result of perverse incentives at the local-government level. Unlike entrepreneurs in a free-enterprise economy, Chinese local officials are motivated primarily by political considerations. As their performance evaluations are based, to a large extent, on GDP growth within their jurisdictions, they have a strong incentive to promote large-scale investment projects.

A typical cycle begins with a relaxation of central government credit and industrial policy. This allows local governments to push investment aggressively, both through state-sector entities they control directly and by offering investment-promotion incentives to private investors and enterprises outside their jurisdictions. The resulting boom puts upward pressure on prices and may also result in shortages of key inputs such as coal and electricity (as was the case in 2003). Once inflation has risen to a level at which it begins to threaten social stability, the central government will intervene by tightening enforcement of industrial and credit policy. Projects that went ahead without required approvals will be halted. Bank lending to particular types of investors will be restricted. Credit then becomes tight and investment growth begins to decline.

=== Unemployment ===
Since the Reform and Open Up, unemployment has been a recurring issue that the Chinese economy grapples with. In 1979–80 there were twenty million unemployed people. The reforms in China's state-owned enterprises had led to the dismantling of life-long employment system colloquially coined as iron rice bowl (铁饭碗), a process that later culminated in large-scale layoffs of urban workers during the period known as Xiagang (下岗), which contributed to drastic rise in urban unemployment since the 1990s. The situation of mass unemployment was later improved following China's admission by the World Trade Organization in 2001.

Recently, China's unemployment landscape has become a pressing concern, particularly among its youth. Official figures indicate a relatively stable urban surveyed unemployment rate of 5.0% as of late 2024, with annual unemployment projected to decline slightly from 5.2% in 2023 to 5.1% in 2024. However, youth unemployment paints a more troubling picture. Officially, the unemployment rate for individuals aged 16 to 24 peaked at 21.3% in mid-2023, before declining to 16.1% by November 2024. Yet, independent estimates suggest that the true youth unemployment rate may have been significantly higher, with some analysts, including a prominent Chinese professor, suggesting it could have reached as high as 46.5%, while others speculated it may have approached or exceeded 50%. Reports have also surfaced about the creation of "fake jobs" or positions that exist on paper but provide no meaningful work or income, aimed at artificially lowering the reported unemployment figures. These issues, compounded by a slowing economy, a prolonged property market crisis, and insufficient demand for skilled labor, have led many young Chinese to "lie flat" or retreat from the workforce altogether. As China implements reforms to improve labor conditions and stimulate economic growth, achieving a projected 5% GDP growth target, youth unemployment and underemployment remain critical challenges for policymakers and society alike.

== Financial and banking system ==
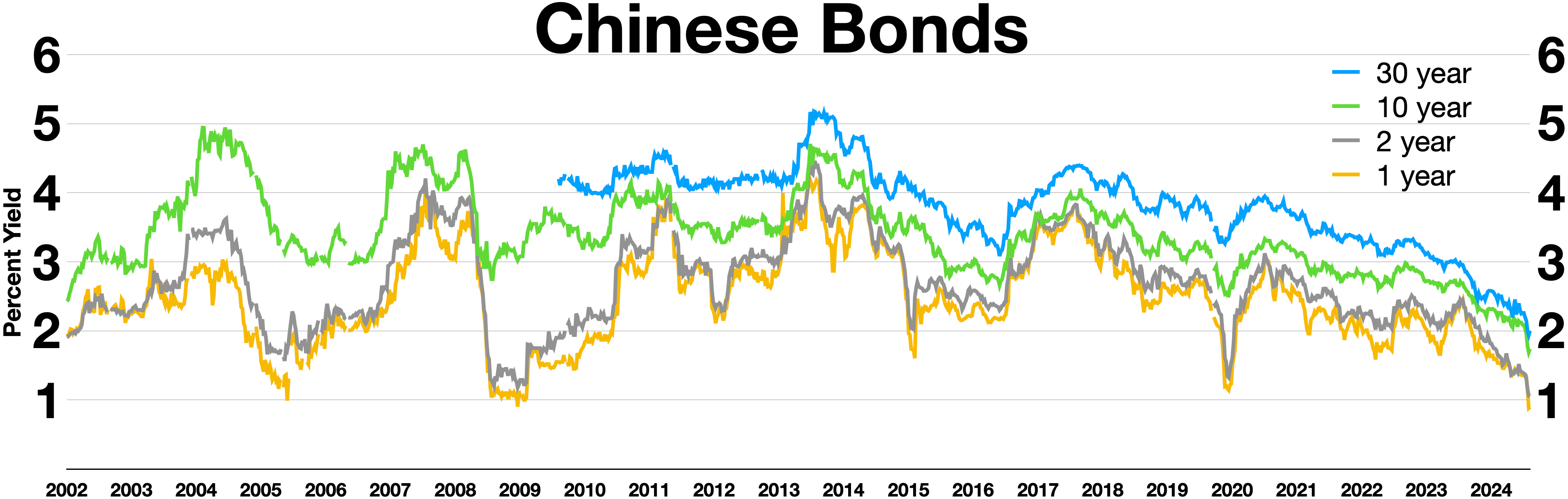
China bond yields 30 year bond 10 year bond 2 year bond 1 year bond

China has the world's largest total banking sector assets of around $45.838 trillion (309.41 trillion CNY) with $42.063 trillion in total deposits and other liabilities. Most of China's financial institutions are state-owned and governed. The chief instruments of financial and fiscal control are the People's Bank of China (PBC) and the Ministry of Finance, both under the authority of the State Council. The People's Bank of China replaced the Central Bank of China in 1950 and gradually took over private banks. It fulfills many of the functions of other central and commercial banks. It issues the currency, controls circulation, and plays an important role in disbursing budgetary expenditures. Additionally, it administers the accounts, payments, and receipts of government organizations and other bodies, which enables it to exert thorough supervision over their financial and general performances in consideration of the government's economic plans. The PBC is also responsible for international trade and other overseas transactions. Remittances by overseas Chinese are managed by the Bank of China (BOC), which has a number of branch offices in several countries.

Other financial institutions that are crucial, include the China Development Bank (CDB), which funds economic development and directs foreign investment; the Agricultural Bank of China (ABC), which provides for the agricultural sector; the China Construction Bank (CCB), which is responsible for capitalizing a portion of overall investment and for providing capital funds for certain industrial and construction enterprises; and the Industrial and Commercial Bank of China (ICBC), which conducts ordinary commercial transactions and acts as a savings bank for the public. China initiated the founding of the Asian Infrastructure Investment Bank in 2015 and the Silk Road Fund in 2014, an investment fund of the Chinese government to foster increased investment and provide financial supports in countries along the One Belt, One Road.

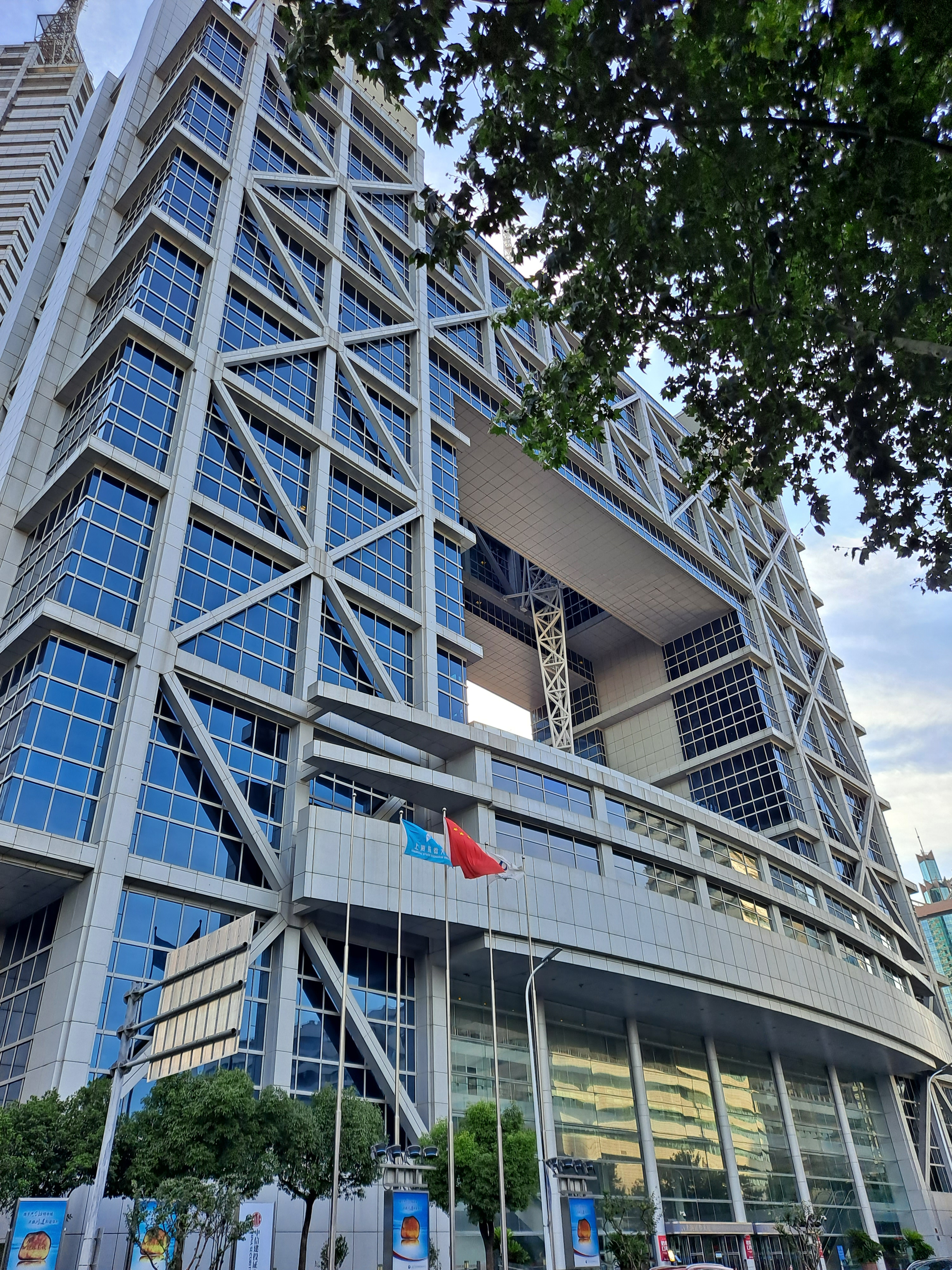
Shanghai Stock Exchange (SSE)

China's economic reforms greatly increased the economic role of the banking system. In theory any enterprises or individuals can go to the banks to obtain loans outside the state plan, in practice, 75% of state bank loans go to State Owned Enterprises. (SOEs) Even though nearly all investment capital was previously provided on a grant basis according to the state plan, policy has since the start of the reform shifted to a loan basis through the various state-directed financial institutions. It is estimated that, as of 2011, 14 trillion Yuan in loans was outstanding to local governments. Much of that total is believed by outside observers to be nonperforming. Increasing amounts of funds are made available through the banks for economic and commercial purposes. Foreign sources of capital have also increased. China has received loans from the World Bank and several United Nations programs, as well as from countries (particularly Japan) and, to a lesser extent, commercial banks. Hong Kong has been a major conduit of this investment, as well as a source itself. On 23 February 2012, the PBC evinced its inclination to liberalize its capital markets when it circulated a telling ten-year timetable. Following on the heels of this development, Shenzhen banks were able to launch cross-border yuan remittances for individuals, a significant shift in the PBC's capital control strictures since Chinese nationals had been previously barred from transferring their yuan to overseas account. Alibaba's financial arm, Ant Group, has been an important part in the digitalization of China's financial system through Alipay, which is one of the country's most used mobile-payment platforms. Originally created to process payments for Alibaba's Taobao marketplace, Alipay expanded into a broader fintech ecosystem that connected consumers and small businesses with digital payments, consumer credit, wealth management products, and insurance. Ant's technology also connects banks and other financial institutions with borrowers, helping extend financial services beyond traditional branch-based banking. Its rapid growth resulted in regulators requiring Ant to restructure its financial holding company to meet oversight requirements and separate it from its lending businesses.

China has four of the world's top ten most competitive financial centers (Shanghai, Hong Kong, Beijing, and Shenzhen), more than any other country. China has three of the world's ten largest stock exchanges (Shanghai, Hong Kong and Shenzhen), both by market capitalization and by trade volume. As of 12 October 2020, the total market capitalization of mainland Chinese stock markets, consisting of the Shanghai Stock Exchange and Shenzhen Stock Exchange, topped US$10 trillion, excluding the Hong Kong Stock Exchange, with about US$5.9 trillion.

As of June 2020, foreign investors had bought a total of US$440 billion in Chinese stocks, representing about 2.9% of the total value, and indicating that foreign investors scooped up a total of US$156.6 billion in the stocks just in the first half of 2020. The total value of China's bond market topped US$15.4 trillion, ranked above that of Japan and the UK, and second only to that of the U.S. with US$40 trillion, as of the beginning of September 2020. As of September 2020, foreign holdings of Chinese bonds reached US$388 billion, or 2.5%, of the total value, notwithstanding an increase by 44.66% year on year.

=== Stock markets ===
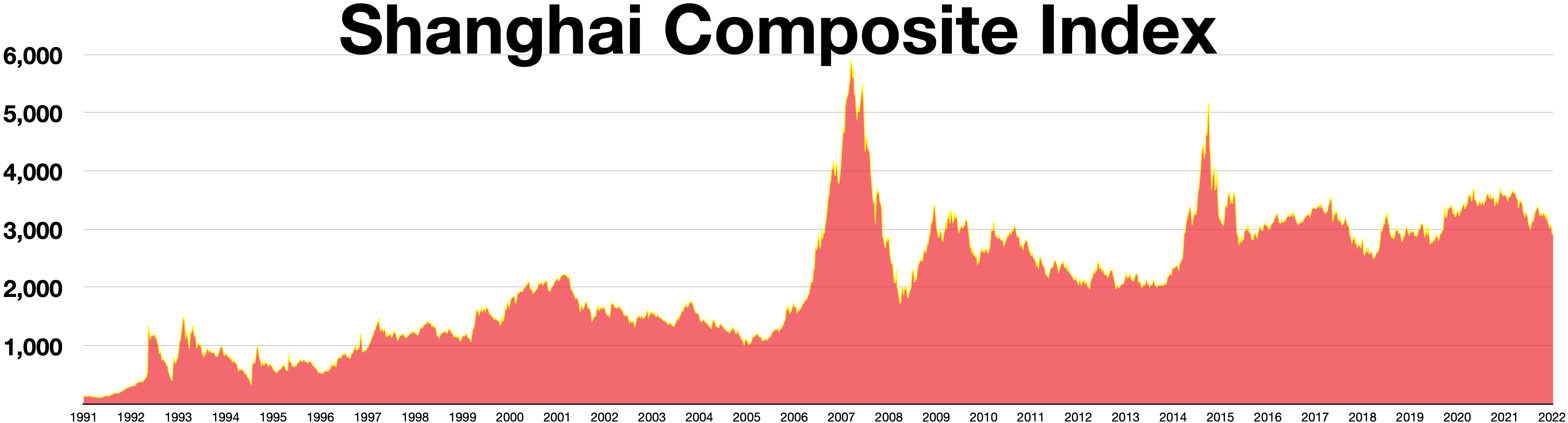
Shanghai Composite Index 1991–2022

As of 2024, China has the second-largest equity markets and futures markets in the world, as well as the third largest bond market. China's stock market exchanges include the Beijing Stock Exchange, the Shanghai Stock Exchange (including the STAR Market), the Shenzhen Stock Exchange, and the Hong Kong Stock Exchange. China's stock market is relatively underdeveloped in comparison to other aspects of its economy.

To be listed on China's stock exchange, companies must demonstrate good financial standing (including sustained profitability), solid corporate governance, including a board of independent directors, supervisory board, auditing, and no history of misreporting or fraud, and have a market capitalization equivalent to at least US$4 million. The government regulates initial public offerings, encouraging them when the market is high in an effort to cool down prices and prohibiting them when the market is low.

When the stock markets re-opened in the PRC period in 1990, most of the listed companies were state-owned enterprises; this was part of an experiment in subjecting SOEs to market discipline. The Shanghai and Shenzhen stock exchanges were under municipal control and termed "experimental points" until 1997. In 1997, the central government brought the exchanges under central government control and affirmed that the exchanges had a legitimate role in the socialist market economy. In 2015, a stock market plunge in China eliminated $2 trillion of global stock market value.

=== Currency system ===
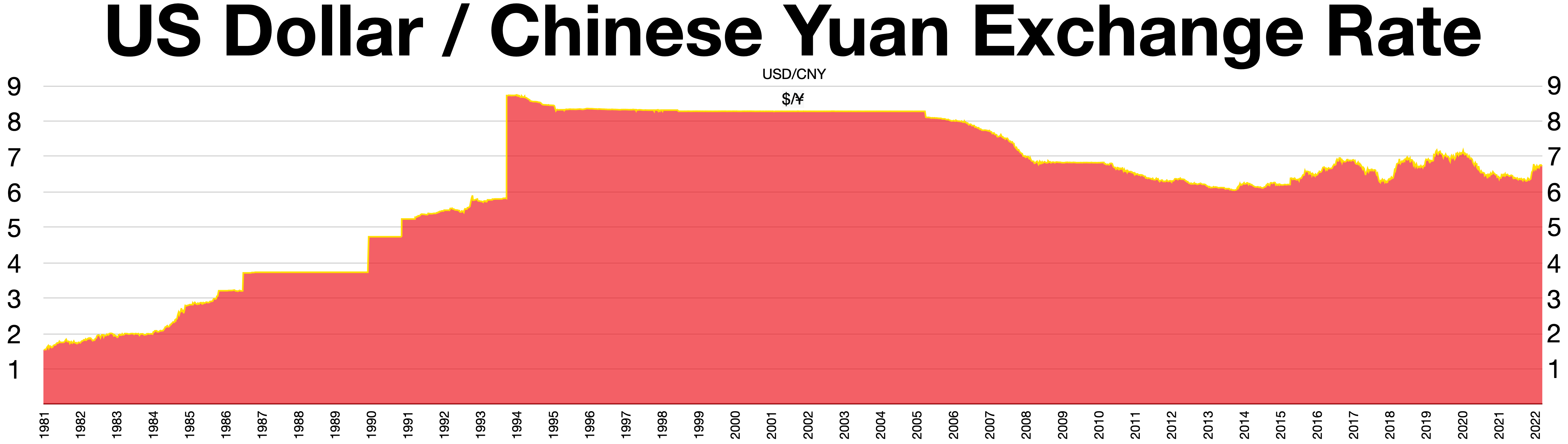
USD/CNY exchange rate 1981–2022

The renminbi ("people's currency") is the currency of China, denominated as the yuan, subdivided into 10 jiao or 100 fen. The renminbi is issued by the People's Bank of China, the monetary authority of China. The ISO 4217 abbreviation is CNY, although also commonly abbreviated as "RMB". As of 2005, the yuan was generally considered by outside observers to be undervalued by about 30–40%. In 2011, the IMF stated that the renminbi was undervalued by 23%. In 2026, the IMF stated that the renminbi was undervalued by 16%.

There is a complex relationship between China's balance of trade, inflation, measured by the consumer price index and the value of its currency. Despite allowing the value of the yuan to "float", China's central bank has decisive ability to control its value with relationship to other currencies An article published in International Review of Economics & Finance in 2010 by Mete Feridun (University of Greenwich Business School) and his colleagues provide empirical evidence that financial development fosters economic growth in China.

The renminbi is held in a floating exchange-rate system managed primarily against the US dollar. China has moved to an exchange rate system that references a basket of currencies and has allowed the renminbi to fluctuate at a daily rate of up to half a percent. A market-based "representative" exchange rate against the U.S. dollar is one of the requirements for designation of a currency as one with Special Drawing Rights (SDR) by the International Monetary Fund (IMF), one of China's goals. Since the late-2000s, China has sought to internationalize the renminbi. As of 2013, the RMB is the 8th most widely traded currency in the world. The internationalization of the Chinese economy continues to affect the standardized economic forecast officially launched in China by the Purchasing Managers Index in 2005.

=== Nonfinancial debt ===
China aims for roughly 5% GDP growth and 2% inflation, using higher fiscal deficits and expanded local government bond issuance to replace shadow LGFVs with official debt. Total government borrowing, including LGFVs, has risen sharply to 124% of GDP, with local government debt over 60% and overall non-financial debt at 312%. In 2014, nonfinancial debt to GDP stood at ~140%. Despite accommodative monetary policies, weak domestic consumption and uncertain exports make growth targets challenging. Nonfinancial debt is the total nominal value of outstanding debt instruments issued by the non-financial corporate sector. This includes corporate, household and government debt.

Household debt has risen past 60% of GDP, mainly from mortgages and leveraged investments, affecting 5–7% of adults. High savings provide some buffer, but a property slump, youth unemployment, and aggressive debt collection heighten financial and social stress. Limited regulations, including cautious personal bankruptcy laws, leave many households exposed while the government balances support with broader economic stability.

== Sectors ==
According to Fortune Global, of the world's 500 largest companies, 135 are headquartered in China. As of 2023, mainland China and Hong Kong were home to 324 largest listed companies measured by revenue in the Fortune Global 2000, ranking second globally. China is also home to more than two hundred privately held technology startups (tech unicorns), each with a valuation of over $1 billion, the highest number in the world.

=== Agriculture, aquaculture, livestock, fishing and forestry ===
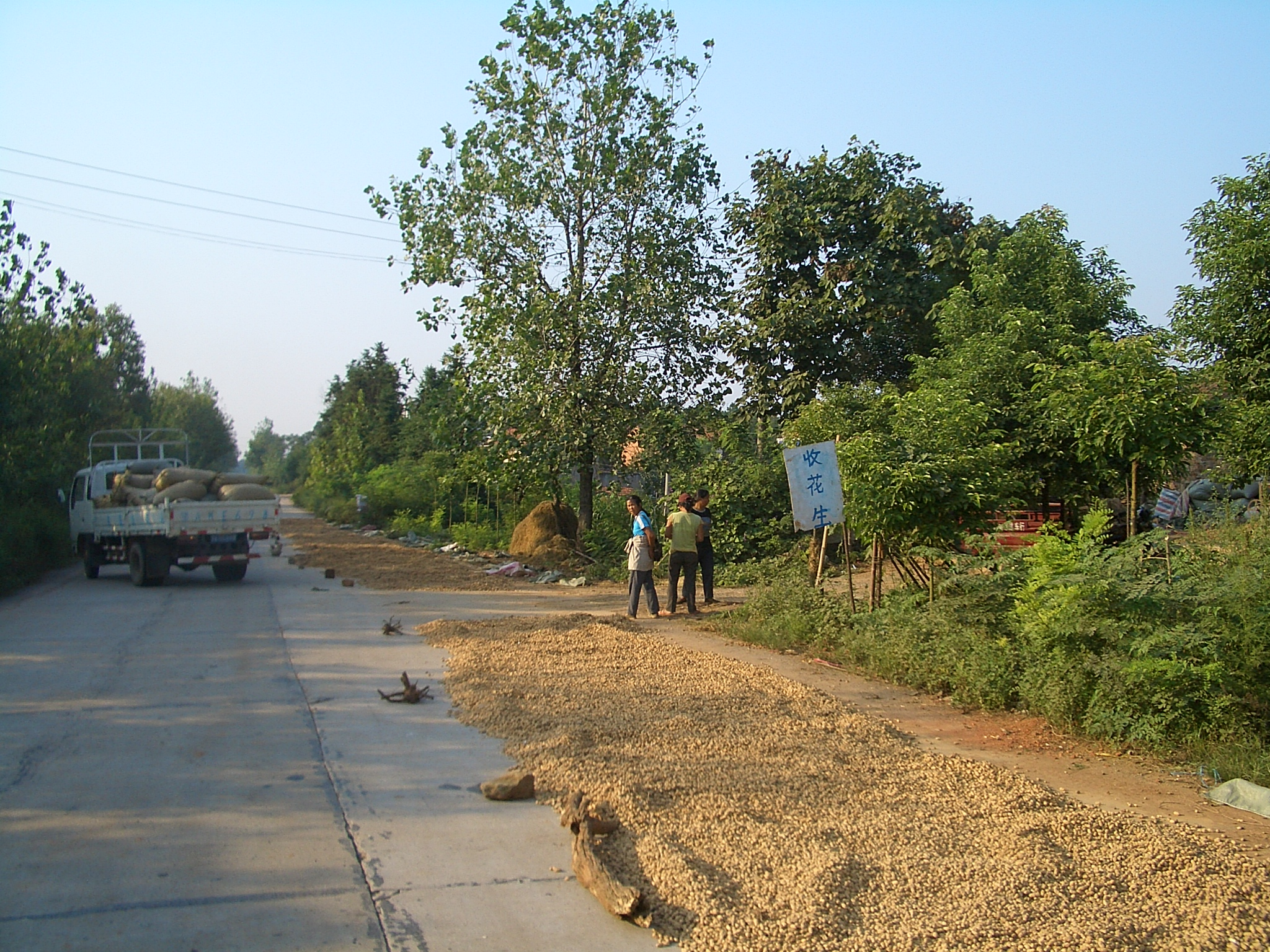
Peanut harvest in Jiangxia District, Hubei

China is the world's largest producer and consumer of agricultural products – and some 300 million Chinese farm workers are in the industry, mostly laboring on pieces of land about the size of U.S. farms. Virtually all arable land is used for food crops. China is the world's largest producer of rice and is among the principal sources of wheat, corn (maize), tobacco, soybeans, potatoes, sorghum, peanuts, tea, millet, barley, oilseed, pork, and fish. Major non-food crops, including cotton, other fibers, and oilseeds, furnish China with a small proportion of its foreign trade revenue. Agricultural exports, such as vegetables and fruits, fish and shellfish, grain and meat products, are exported to Hong Kong. Yields are high because of intensive cultivation, for example, China's cropland area is only 75% of the U.S. total, but China still produces about 30% more crops and livestock than the United States. China hopes to further increase agricultural production through improved plant stocks, fertilizers, and technology.

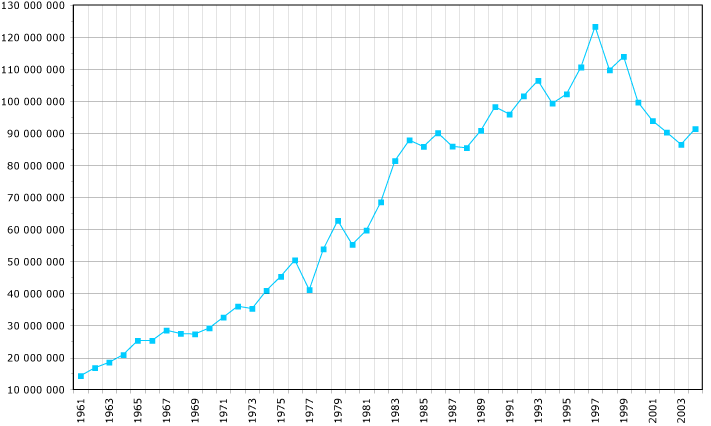
Production of wheat from 1961 to 2004 (data from FAO in 2005, y-axis: production in metric tons)

According to the United Nations World Food Programme, in 2022, China fed eighteen percent of the world's population with only seven percent of the world's arable land.

Animal husbandry constitutes the second most important component of agricultural production. China is the world's leading producer of pigs, chickens, and eggs, and it also has sizable herds of sheep and cattle. Since the mid-1970s, greater emphasis has been placed on increasing the livestock output. China has a long tradition of ocean and freshwater fishing and of aquaculture. Pond raising has always been important and has been increasingly emphasized to supplement coastal and inland fisheries threatened by overfishing and to provide such valuable export commodities as prawns. China is also unmatched in the size and reach of its fishing armada with anywhere from 200,000 to 800,000 boats, some as far afield as Argentina. Fueled primarily by government subsidies, its growth and activities have largely gone unchecked.

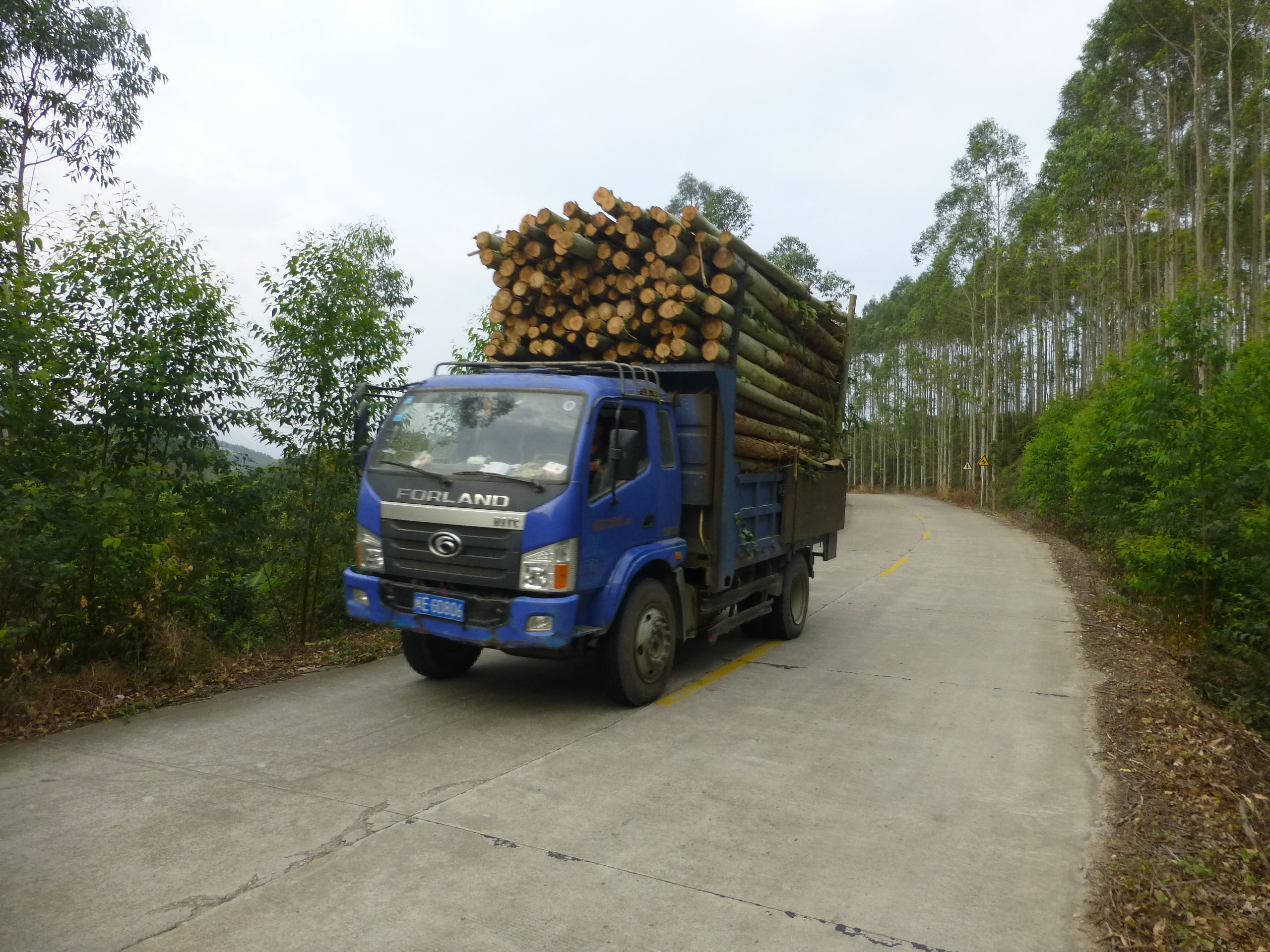
Timber transported from a woodlot in the hills of Zhangpu County, Fujian

Environmental problems such as floods, drought, and erosion pose serious threats to farming in many parts of the country. The wholesale destruction of forests gave way to an energetic reforestation program that proved inadequate, and forest resources are still fairly meagre. The principal forests are found in the Qin Mountains and the central mountains and on the Yunnan–Guizhou Plateau. Because they are inaccessible, the Qinling forests are not worked extensively, and much of the country's timber comes from Heilongjiang, Jilin, Sichuan, and Yunnan.

Western China, comprising Tibet, Xinjiang, and Qinghai, has little agricultural significance except for areas of floriculture and cattle raising. Rice, China's most important crop, is dominant in the southern provinces and many of the farms here yield two harvests a year. In the north, wheat is of the greatest importance, while in central China wheat and rice vie with each other for the top place. Millet and kaoliang (a variety of grain sorghum) are grown mainly in the northeast and some central provinces, which, together with some northern areas, also provide considerable quantities of barley. Most of the soybean crop is derived from the north and the northeast; corn (maize) is grown in the center and the north, while tea comes mainly from the warm and humid hilly areas of the south. Cotton is grown extensively in the central provinces, but it is also found to a lesser extent in the southeast and in the north. Tobacco comes from the center and parts of the south. Other important crops are potatoes, sugar beets, and oilseeds.

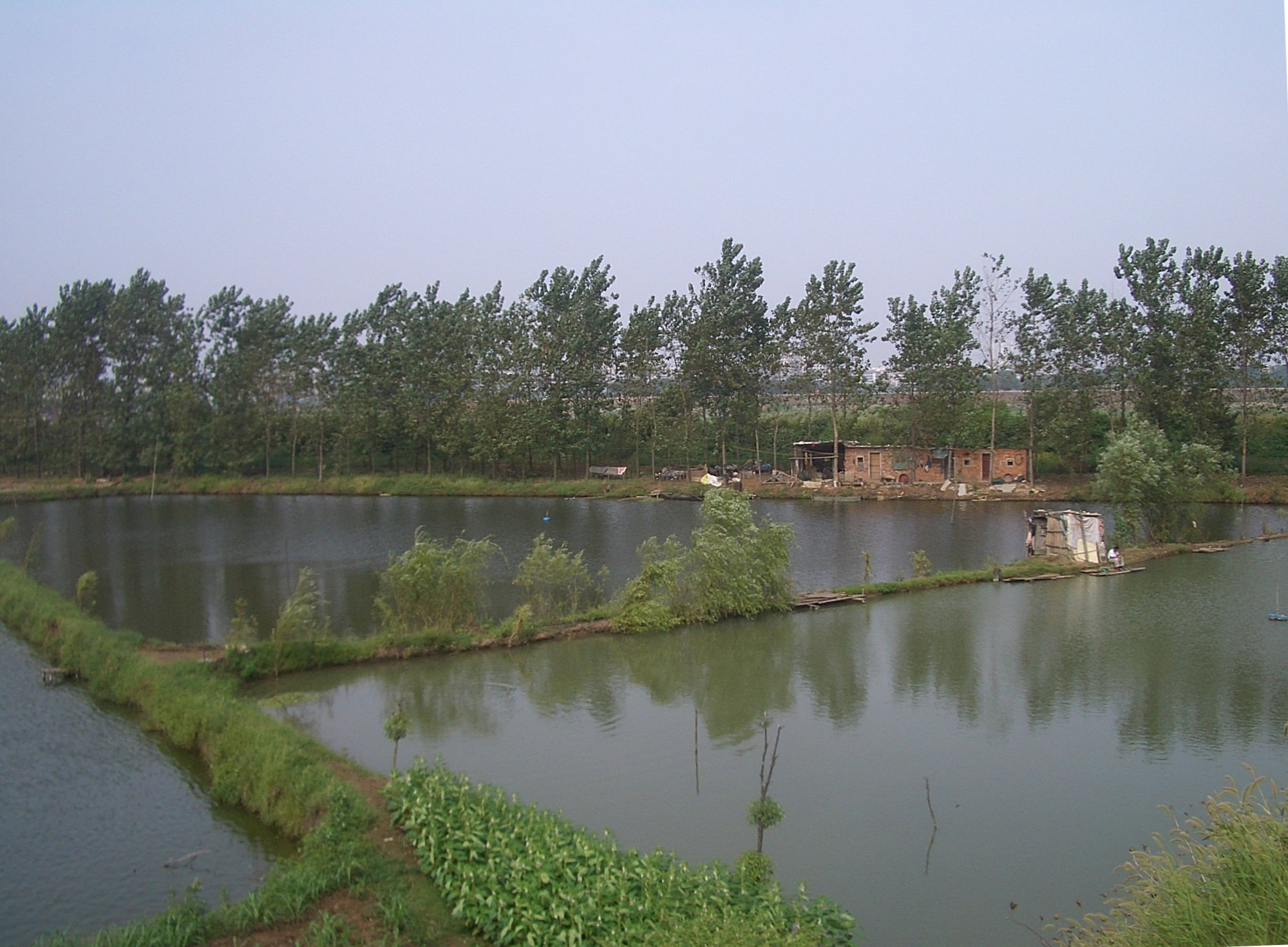
Fish ponds near Daye, Hubei

In the past decade, the government has been encouraging agricultural mechanization and land consolidation to raise yields and compensate for the loss of rural workers who have migrated to the cities. According to statistics by the UN Food and Agriculture Organization, the annual growth rate of agricultural mechanization in China is 6.4%. By 2014, the integrated mechanization rate had risen to nearly 60%, with the rate for wheat surpassing 90% and that for maize approaching 80%. In addition to standard agricultural equipment like tractors, China's agriculture cooperatives have begun using high-tech equipment, including unmanned aerial vehicles, which are used to spray crops with pesticides. Good progress has been made in increasing water conservancy, and about half the cultivated land is under irrigation.

In the late 1970s and early 1980s, economic reforms were introduced. First of all this began with the shift of farming work to a system of household responsibility and a phasing out of collectivized agriculture. Later this expanded to include a gradual liberalization of price controls; fiscal decentralization; massive privatization of state enterprises, thereby allowing a wide variety of private enterprises in the services and light manufacturing; the foundation of a diversified banking system (but with large amounts of state control); the development of a stock market; and the opening of the economy to increased foreign trade and foreign investment.

=== Energy and mineral resources ===
Electricity production in China 1985–2024

Electricity:
- Production: 6.5 trillion kWh (2017)
- Consumption: 7.7620 trillion kWh (2020)
- Exports: 21.8 billion kwh (2020)
- Imports: 6.2 billion kwh (2015)

Electricity – production by source (2023):

- Coal: 60.5%
- Hydro: 13.2%
- Wind: 9.4%
- Solar: 6.2%
- Nuclear: 4.6%
- Natural gas: 3.3%
- Bioenergy: 2.2%

Oil:

- Production: 3,527,000 bbl/d (560,700 m^{3}/d) (2022)
- Consumption: 6,534,000 bbl/d (1,038,800 m^{3}/d) (2005) and expected 9,300,000 bbl/d (1,480,000 m^{3}/d) in 2030
- Exports: 443,300 bbl/d (70,480 m^{3}/d) (2005)
- Imports: 10,170,000 bbl/d (1,617,000 m^{3}/d) (2022)
- Net imports: 2,740,000 barrels per day (436,000 m^{3}/d) (2005)
- Proved reserves: 16.3 Gbbl (2.59×10^{9} m^{3}) (1 January 2006)

Natural gas:

- Production: 47.88 km^{3} (2005 est.)
- Consumption: 44.93 km^{3} (2005 est.)
- Exports: 2.944 km^{3} (2005)
- Imports: 0 m^{3} (2005)
- Proved reserves: 1,448 km^{3} (1 January 2006 est.)

Over the years, large subsidies were built into the price structure of certain commodities and these subsidies grew substantially in the late 1970s and 1980s. Since 1980, China's energy production has grown dramatically, as has the proportion allocated to domestic consumption. Some 80 percent of all power is generated from fossil fuel at thermal plants, with about 17 percent at hydroelectric installations; only about two percent is from nuclear energy, mainly from plants located in Guangdong and Zhejiang. Though China has rich overall energy potential, most have yet to be developed. In addition, the geographical distribution of energy puts most of these resources relatively far from their major industrial users. The northeast is rich in coal and oil, the central part of north China has abundant coal, and the southwest has immense hydroelectric potential. But the industrialized regions around Guangzhou and the Lower Yangtze region around Shanghai have too little energy, while there is relatively little heavy industry located near major energy resource areas other than in the southern part of the northeast.

Due in large part to environmental concerns, China has wanted to shift China's current energy mix from a heavy reliance on coal, which accounts for 70–75% of China's energy, toward greater reliance on oil, natural gas, renewable energy, and nuclear power. China has closed thousands of coal mines over the past five to ten years to cut overproduction. Since 1993, China has been a net importer of oil, a large portion of which comes from the Middle East. According to Chinese statistics, this has reduced coal production by over 25%. As of 2023, solar power has become cheaper than coal-fired power in China.

By 2010, rapidly rising wages and a general increase in the standard of living had put increased energy use on a collision course with the need to reduce carbon emissions in order to control global warming. There were diligent efforts to increase energy efficiency and increase use of renewable sources; over 1,000 inefficient power plants had been closed, but projections continued to show a dramatic rise in carbon emissions from burning fossil fuels.

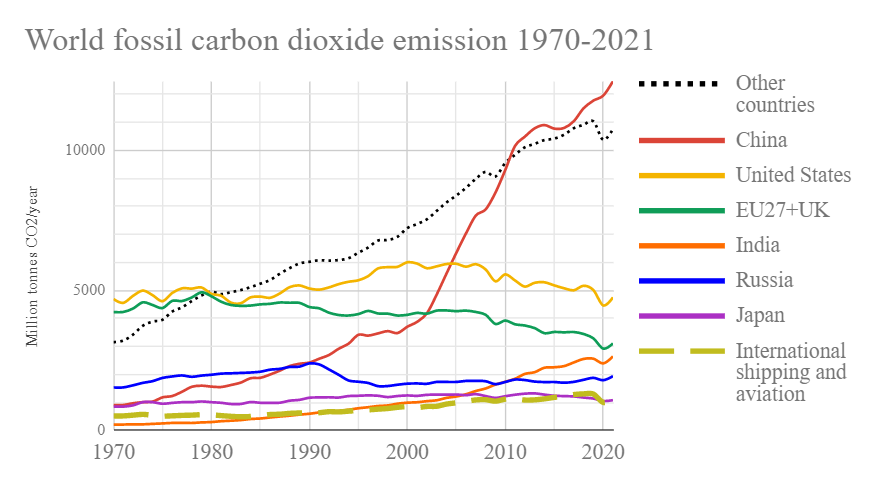
Historical annual CO_{2} emissions for the top six countries and confederations

While not the largest source of historical cumulative emissions, today China accounts for one quarter of global greenhouse gas emissions. On a per capita basis, China's emissions in 2019 (9 tonnes CO_{2}-equivalent [tCO_{2}e] per year) surpass those of the European Union (7.6 tCO_{2}e) but remain slightly below the Organisation for Economic Co-operation and Development (OECD) average (10.7 tCO_{2}e) and well below the United States average (17.6 tCO_{2}e). However, the carbon intensity of China's GDP—the amount of carbon used to generate a unit of output—remains relatively high. To avoid the long-term socioeconomic cost of environmental pollution in China, it has been suggested by Nicholas Stern and Fergus Green of the Grantham Research Institute on Climate Change and the Environment that the economy of China be shifted to more advanced industrial development with low carbon dioxide emissions and better allocation of national resources to innovation and R&D for sustainable economic growth in order to reduce the impact of China's heavy industry. This is in accord with the planning goals of the central government. Contrary to the publicized goals, China is building a large number of coal fired power plants and it carbon emissions could further increase.

==== Mining ====
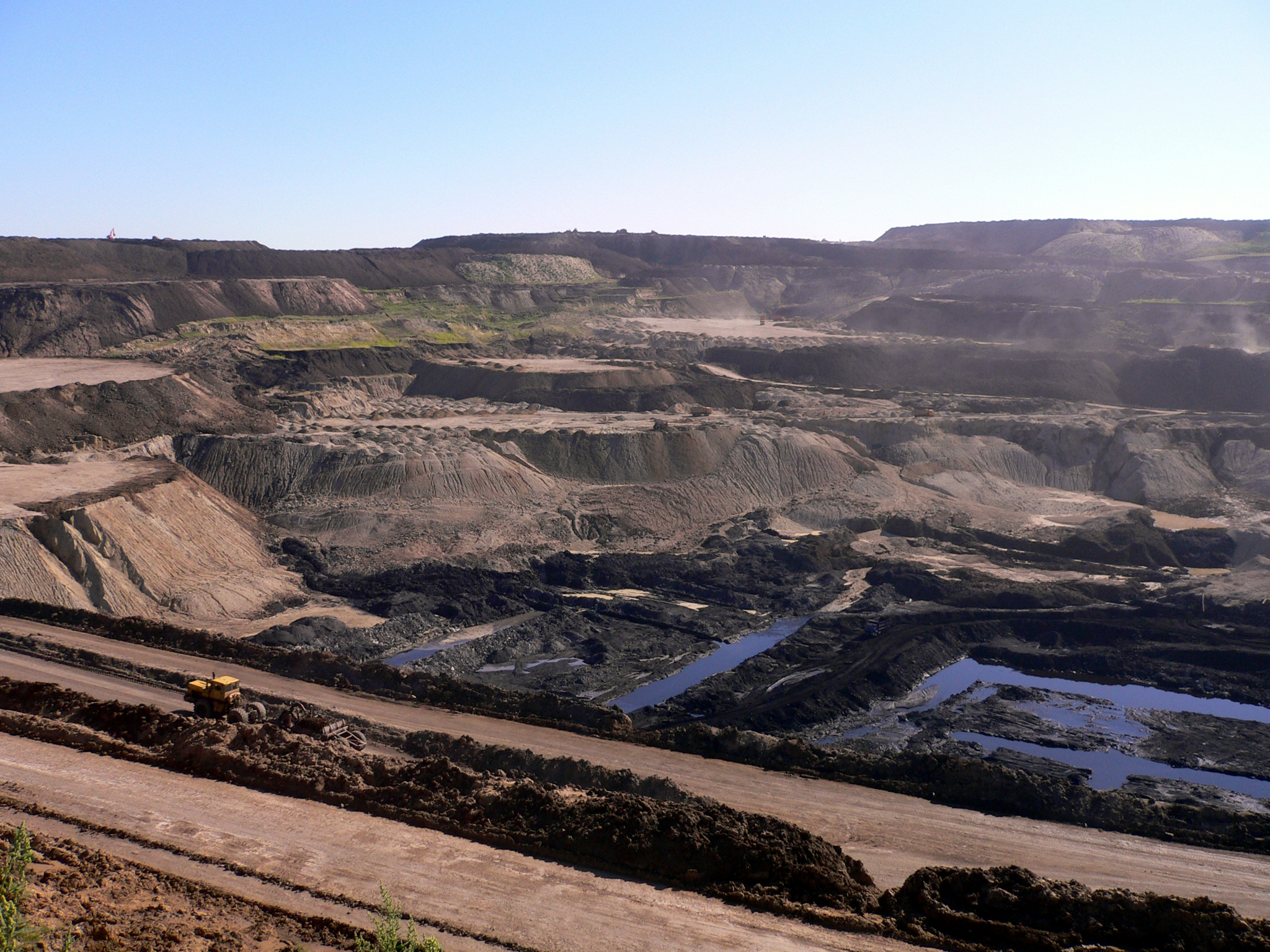
A coal mine near Hailar District

As of 2022, more than 200 types of minerals are actively explored or mined in the People's Republic of China (PRC). These resources are widely but not evenly distributed throughout the country. Taken as a whole, China's economy and exports do not rely on the mining industry, but the industry is critical to various subnational governments of the PRC.

Mining is extensively regulated in the PRC and involves numerous regulatory bodies. The state owns all mineral rights, regardless of the ownership of the land on which the minerals are located. Mining rights can be obtained upon government approval, and payment of mining and prospecting fees.

During the Mao Zedong era, mineral exploration and mining was limited to state-owned enterprises and collectively owned enterprises and private exploration of mineral resources was largely prohibited. The industry was opened to private enterprises during the reform and opening up in the 1980s and became increasingly marketized in the 1990s. In the mid-2000s, the Chinese government sought to consolidate the industry due to concerns about underutilization of resources, workplace safety, and environmental harm. During that period, state-owned enterprises purchased smaller privately owned mines. China's mining industry grew substantially and the period from the early 2000s to 2012 is often referred to as a "golden decade" in the mining industry.

==== Hydroelectric resources ====
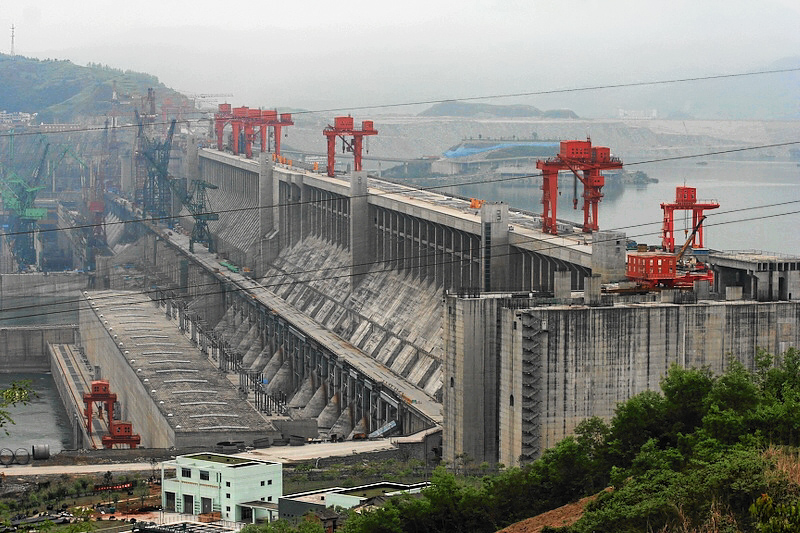
Three Gorges Dam

China has an abundant potential for hydroelectric power production due to its considerable river network and mountainous terrain. Most of the total hydroelectric capacity is situated in the southwest of the country, where coal supplies are poor but demand for energy is rising swiftly. The potential in the northeast is fairly small, but it was there that the first hydroelectric stations were built – by the Japanese during its occupation of Manchuria.

==== Coal ====
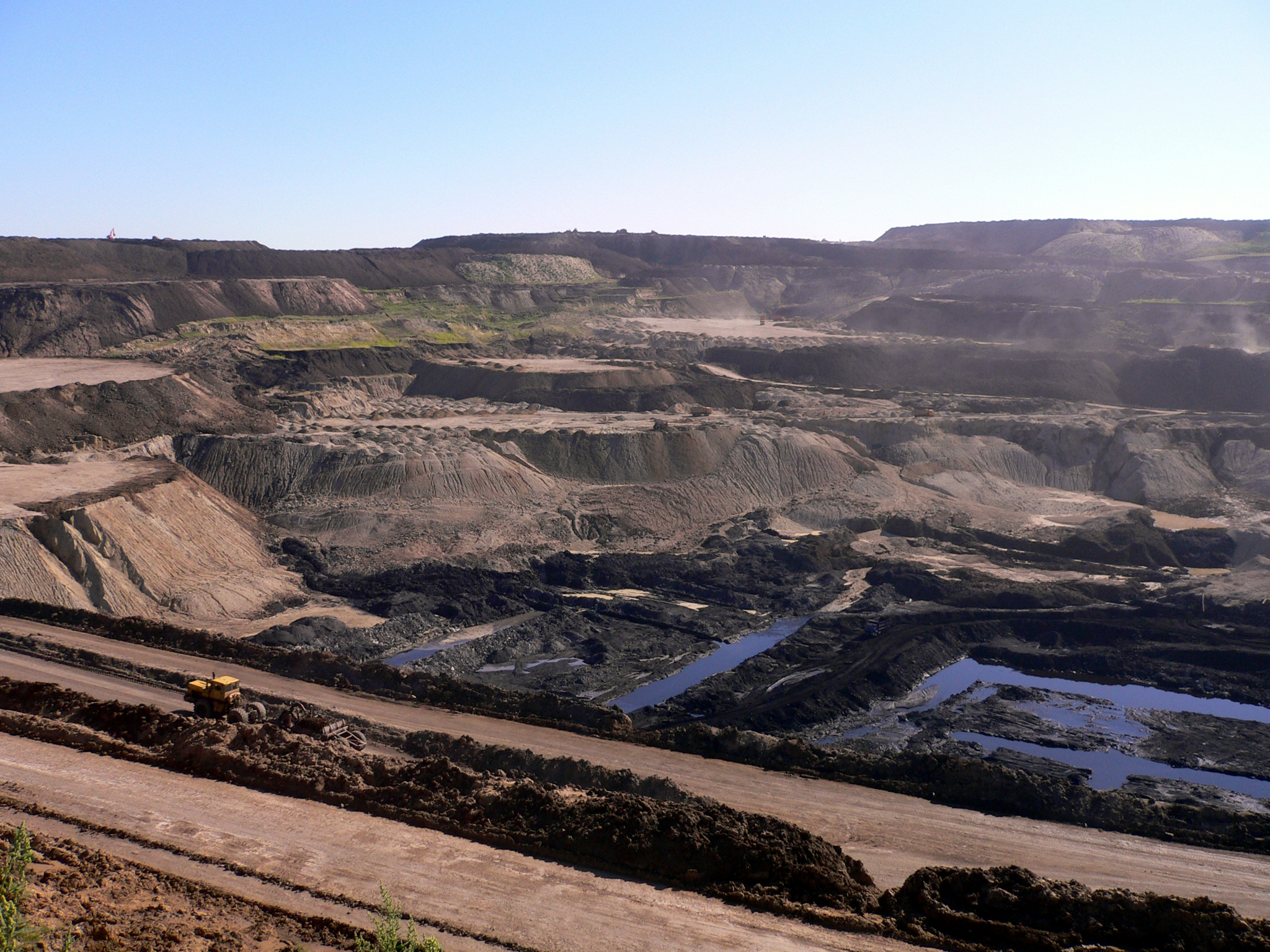
Coal mining in Inner Mongolia

China is well-endowed with mineral resources, the most important of which is coal. China's mineral resources include large reserves of coal and iron ore, plus adequate to abundant supplies of nearly all other industrial minerals. Although coal deposits are widely scattered (some types of coal is found in every province), most of the total is located in the northern part of the country. The province of Shanxi, in fact, is thought to contain about half of the total; other important coal-bearing provinces include Heilongjiang, Liaoning, Jilin, Hebei, and Shandong. Apart from these northern provinces, significant quantities of coal are present in Sichuan, and there are some deposits of importance in Guangdong, Guangxi, Yunnan, and Guizhou. A large part of the country's reserves consists of good bituminous coal, but there are also large deposits of lignite. Anthracite is present in several places (especially Liaoning, Guizhou, and Henan), but overall, it is not very significant.

To ensure a more even distribution of coal supplies and to reduce the strain on the less than adequate transportation network, the authorities pressed for the development of a large number of small, locally run mines throughout the country. This campaign was energetically pursued after the 1960s, with the result that thousands of small pits have been established, and they produce more than half the country's coal. This output, however, is typically expensive and is used for local consumption. It has also led to a less than stringent implementation of safety measures in these unregulated mines, which cause several thousands of deaths each year.

Coal makes up the bulk of China's energy consumption (55% in 2021), and China is the largest producer and consumer of coal in the world. As China's economy continues to grow, China's coal demand is projected to rise significantly. Although coal's share of China's overall energy consumption will decrease, coal consumption will continue to rise in absolute terms. China's continued and increasing reliance on coal as a power source has contributed significantly to putting China on the path to becoming the world's largest emitter of acid rain-causing sulfur dioxide and greenhouse gases, including carbon dioxide.

==== Oil and natural gas ====
Chinese oil reserves

China's onshore oil resources are mostly located in the Northeast and in Xinjiang, Gansu, Qinghai, Sichuan, Shandong, and Henan provinces. Oil shale is found in a number of places, especially at Fushun in Liaoning, where the deposits overlie the coal reserves, as well as in Guangdong. High quality light oil has been found in the Pearl River estuary of the South China Sea, the Qaidam Basin in Qinghai, and the Tarim Basin in Xinjiang. The country consumes most of its oil output but does export some crude oil and oil products. China has explored and developed oil deposits in the South China Sea and East China Sea, the Yellow Sea, the Gulf of Tonkin, and the Bohai Sea.

In 2013, the pace of China's economic growth exceeded the domestic oil capacity and floods damaged the nation's oil fields in the middle of the year. Consequently, China imported oil to compensate for the supply reduction and surpassed the US in September 2013 to become the world's largest importer of oil.

The total extent of China's natural gas reserves is unknown, as relatively little exploration for natural gas has been done. Sichuan accounts for almost half of the known natural gas reserves and production. Most of the rest of China's natural gas is associated gas produced in the Northeast's major oil fields, especially Daqing oilfield. Other gas deposits have been found in the Qaidam Basin, Hebei, Jiangsu, Shanghai, and Zhejiang, and offshore to the southwest of Hainan. According to an article published in Energy Economics in 2011 by economists Mete Feridun (University of Greenwich) and Abdul Jalil (Wuhan University in China), financial development in China has not taken place at the expense of environmental pollution and financial development has led to a decrease in environmental pollution. Authors conclude that carbon emissions are mainly determined by income, energy consumption and trade openness and their findings confirm the existence of an Environmental Kuznets Curve in the case of China.

==== Metals and nonmetals ====
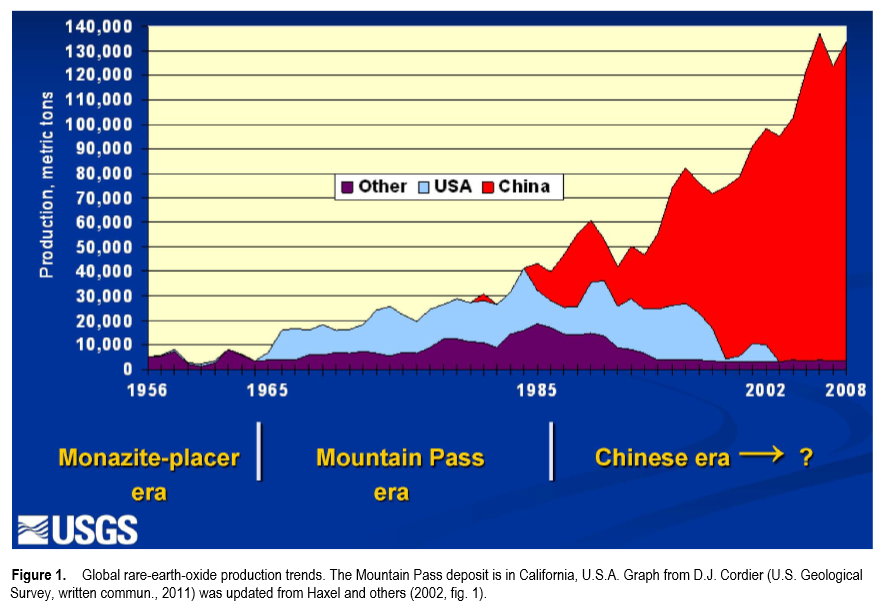
Global rare-earth-oxide production trends, 1956–2008 (USGS)

Iron ore reserves are found in most provinces, including Hainan. Gansu, Guizhou, southern Sichuan, and Guangdong provinces have rich deposits. The largest mined reserves are located north of the Yangtze River and supply neighboring iron and steel enterprises. With the exception of nickel, chromium, and cobalt, China is well supplied with ferroalloys and manganese. Reserves of tungsten are also known to be fairly large. Copper resources are moderate, and high-quality ore is present only in a few deposits. Discoveries have been reported from Ningxia. Lead and zinc are available, and bauxite resources are thought to be plentiful. China's antimony reserves are the largest in the world. Tin resources are plentiful, and there are fairly rich deposits of gold. China is the world's fifth largest producer of gold and in the early 21st century became an important producer and exporter of rare metals needed in high-technology industries.

China also produces a fairly wide range of nonmetallic minerals. One of the most important of these is salt, which is derived from coastal evaporation sites in Jiangsu, Hebei, Shandong, and Liaoning, as well as from extensive salt fields in Sichuan, Ningxia, and the Qaidam Basin. There are important deposits of phosphate rock in a number of areas, Jiangxi, Guangxi, Yunnan and Hubei. Production has been accelerating every year. As of 2013 China is producing 97,000,000 metric tons of phosphate rock a year. Pyrites occur in several places; Liaoning, Hebei, Shandong, and Shanxi have the most important deposits. China also has large resources of fluorite (fluorspar), gypsum, asbestos, and has the world's largest reserves and production of cement, clinker and limestone.

==== Renewable energy ====
Since the early 2000s, China's clean energy sector has rapidly developed. This growth has enabled renewable energy to have an important role in China's international cooperation, including South-South cooperation in which China is a major source of clean energy technology transfer to other developing countries. As of 2023, China is the world's leading producer of solar panels and wind turbines.

China has sought to lessen its reliance on importing fossil fuels. Fossil fuels still account for 80% of China's energy consumption, but renewables now generate 35% of its electricity and account for 83% of new electricity demand as of 2024. In a survey taken the same year, 44% of experts said that China's CO2 emissions would peak by the end of 2025, five years ahead of its official target. Chinese companies control 80% of the production chain in the world's green energy industry. Due to supply from green energy, China's industrial electricity prices have stabilized at $0.09 per kilowatt hour for the past five years despite massive growth in electricity demand. Chinese renewable energy production has major international implications, with 87% of electricity production investment in the Global South going to the purchase of Chinese renewables and associated technologies.

=== Industry and manufacturing ===
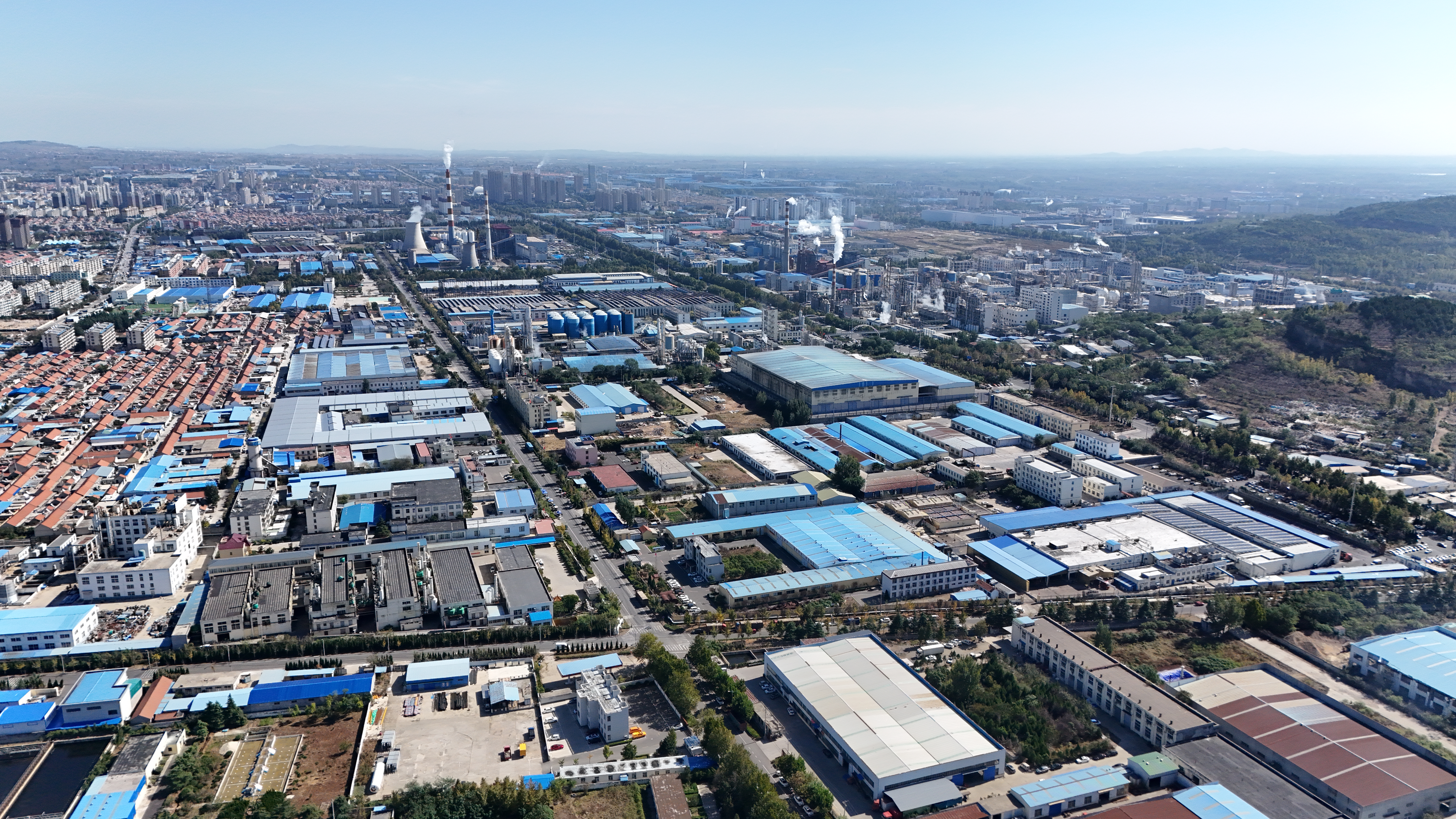
An industrial area in Yishui, Shandong

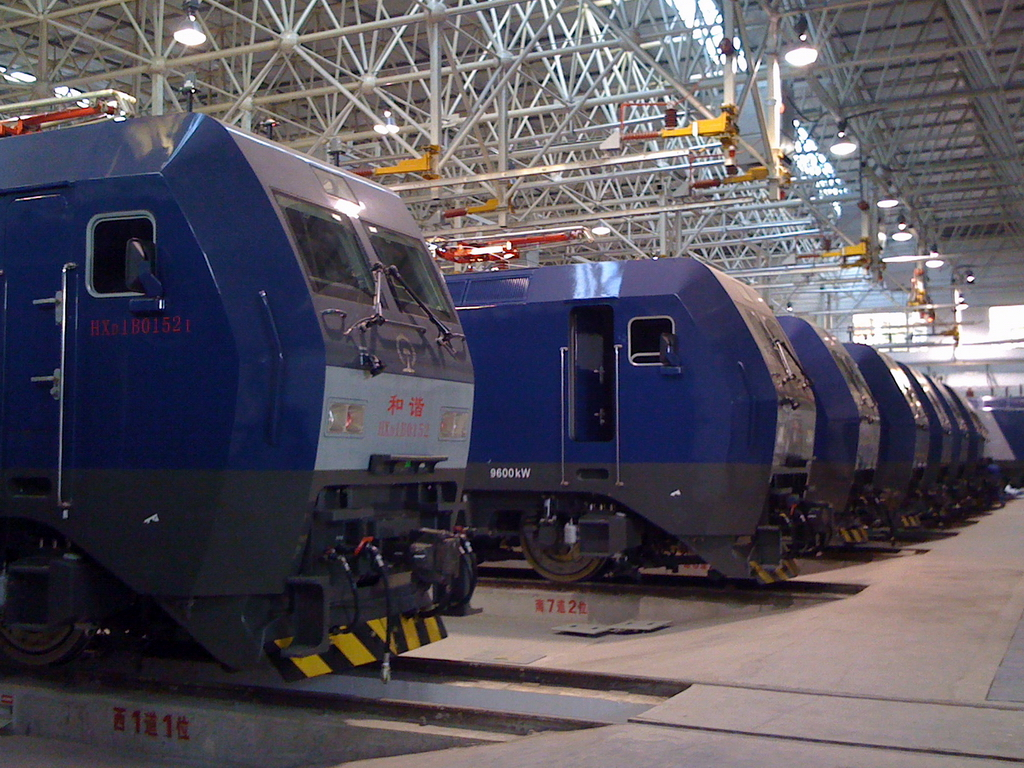
China Railway HXD1B Manufactured by CRRC

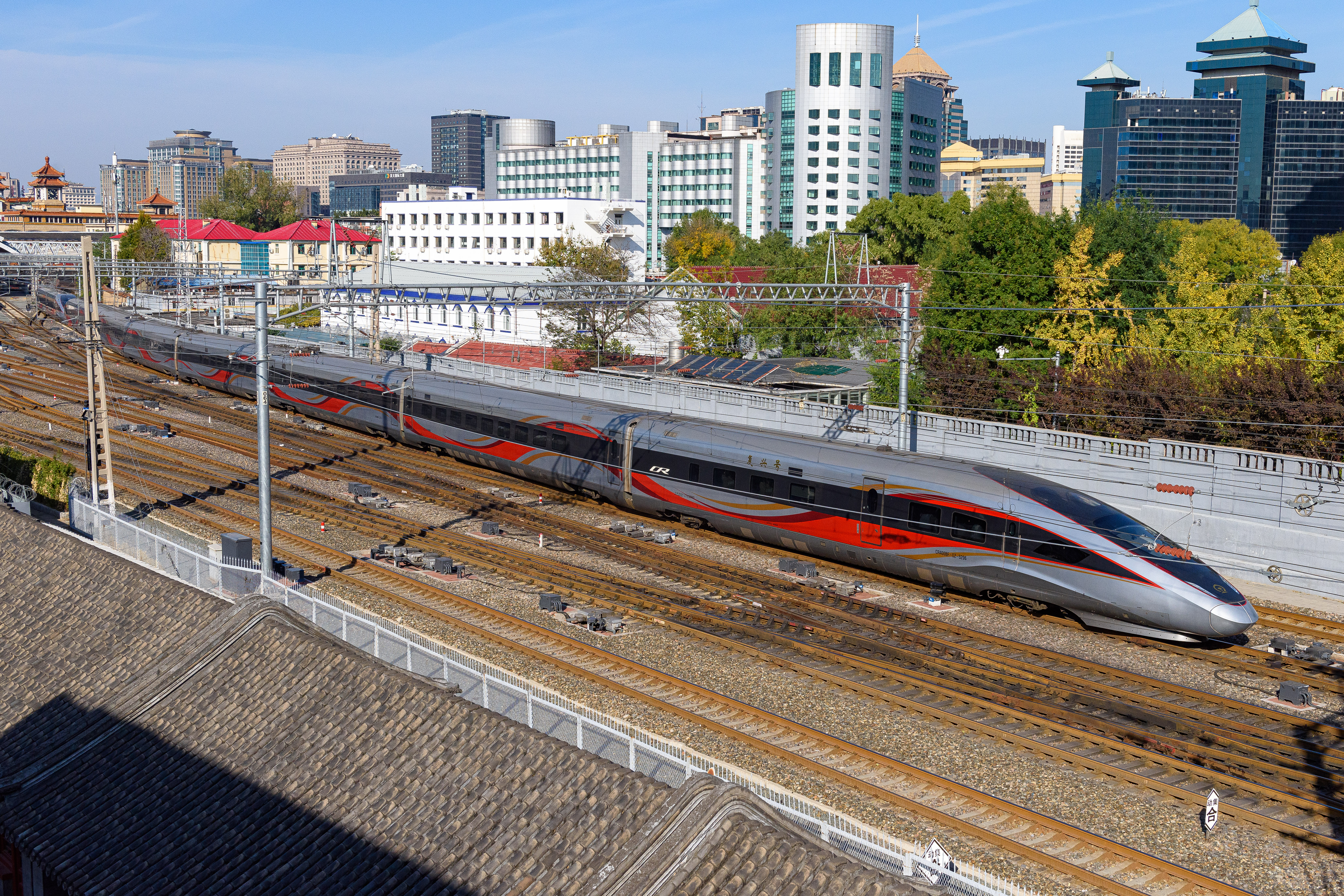
Fuxing high speed train produced by CRRC

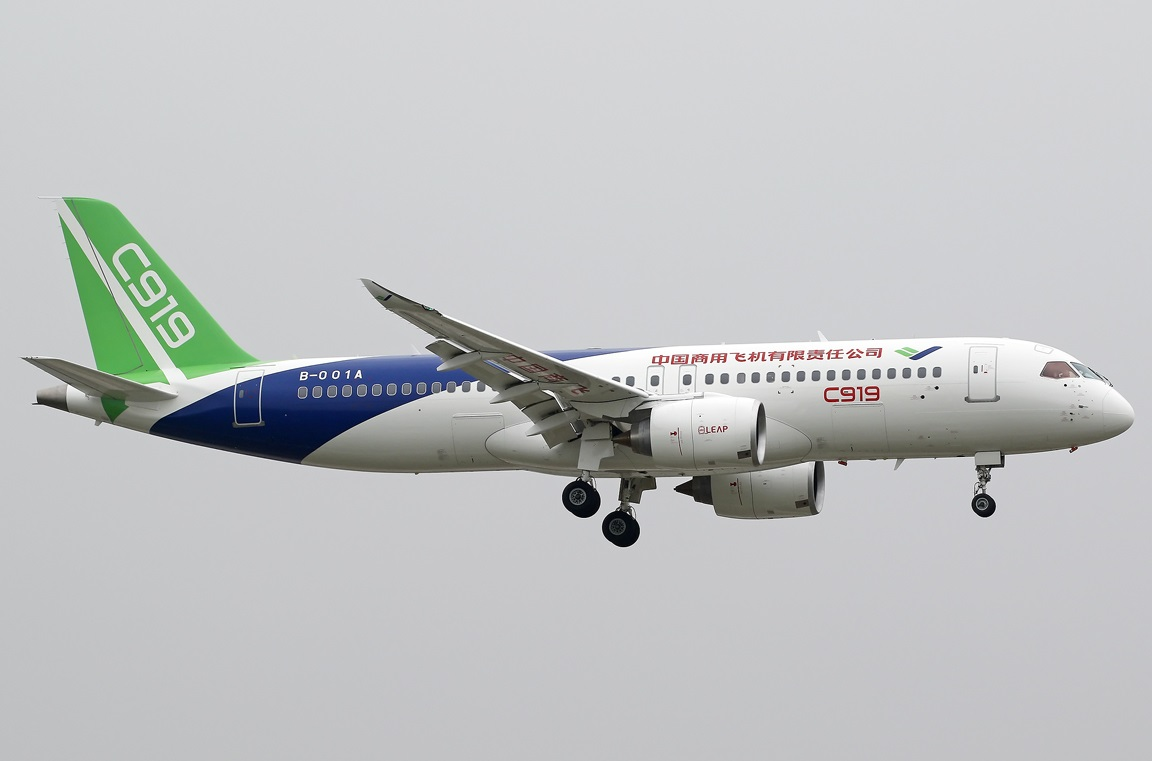
C919 developed by Chinese aerospace manufacturer Comac

China has a strong global position in the production of industrial goods and some of its companies are global leader in the areas of steel, solar energy, and telecommunications accessories. As of 2024, industry accounts for 36.5% of China's GDP. From 2010 until at least 2023, China produces more industrial goods than any other country. As of 2023, China manufactures approximately one fifth of the world's total output of industrial products.

Major industries include mining and ore processing; iron and steel; aluminium; coal; machinery; armaments; textiles and apparel; petroleum; cement; chemical; fertilizers; food processing; automobiles and other transportation equipment including rail cars and locomotives, ships, and aircraft; consumer products including footwear, toys, and electronics; telecommunications and information technology.

Since the founding of the People's Republic, industrial development has been given considerable attention; as of 2011 46% of China's national output continued to be devoted to investment; a percentage far higher than any other nation. Among the various industrial branches the machine-building and metallurgical industries have received the highest priority. These two areas alone now account for about 20–30 percent of the total gross value of industrial output. In these, as in most other areas of industry, however, innovation has generally suffered at the hands of a system that has rewarded increases in gross output rather than improvements in variety, sophistication and quality. China, therefore, still imports significant quantities of specialized steels. Overall industrial output has grown at an average rate of more than ten percent per year, having surpassed all other sectors in economic growth and degree of modernization.

Following its 2001 entry into the World Trade Organization, China quickly developed a reputation as the "world's factory" through its manufacturing exports. The complexity of its exports increased over time, and as of 2019 it accounts for approximately 25% of all high tech goods produced globally. The proportion of Chinese manufactured goods at the higher end of the value chain grew at a faster rate after 2020. As of 2024, China has significant industrial capacity in excess of its domestic needs. The government has sought to alleviate industrial capacity by channeling it abroad, including through the Belt and Road Initiative.

The predominant focus of development in the chemical industry is to expand the output of chemical fertilizers, plastics, and synthetic fibers. The growth of this industry has placed China among the world's leading producers of nitrogenous fertilizers. In the consumer goods sector the main emphasis is on textiles and clothing, which also form an important part of China's exports. Textile manufacturing, a rapidly growing proportion of which consists of synthetics, account for about ten percent of the gross industrial output and continues to be important, but less so than before. The industry tends to be scattered throughout the country, but there are a number of important textile centers, including Shanghai, Guangzhou, and Harbin. There is a growing consumer culture in China.

==== Iron and steel ====
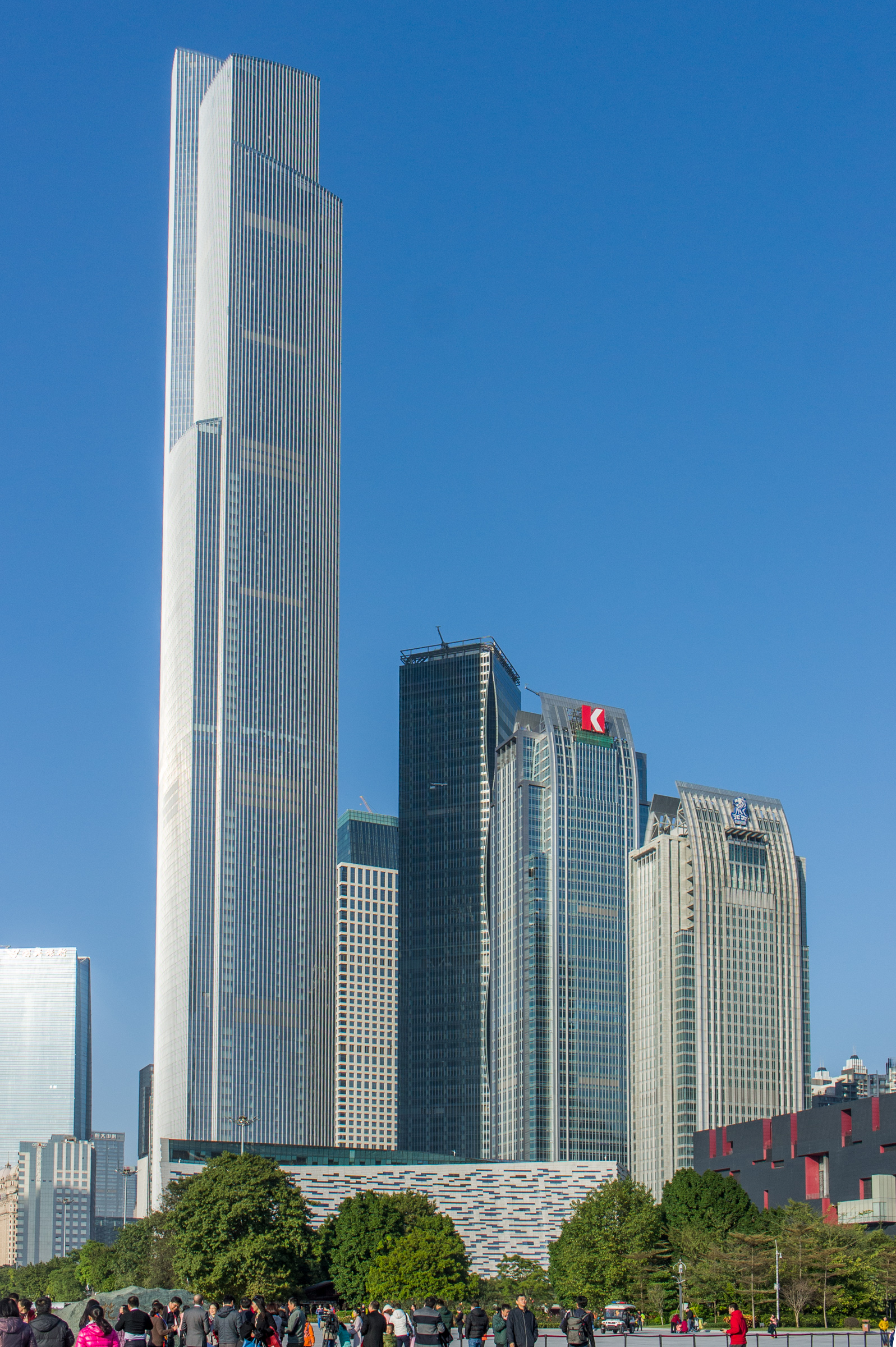
Skyscrapers of Guangzhou

In 2020, China produced over 1053 million tonnes of steel, over half of the world total. This was an increase of 5.6% over the previous year as global steel production fell by 0.9%. China's share of global crude steel production increased from 53.3% in 2019 to 56.5% in 2020, decreasing -2.1% in 2021.

Iron ore production kept pace with steel production in the early 1990s but was soon outpaced by imported iron ore and other metals in the early 2000s. Steel production, an estimated 140 million tons in 2000 increased to 419 million tons in 2006 and 928 million tons by 2018. China was the top exporter of steel in the world in 2021; export volumes in 2021 were 66.2 million tons. Domestic demand remains strong, particularly in the developing west where steel production in Xinjiang was expanding. Of the 45 largest steel producing companies in the world, 21 are Chinese, including the world's largest, China Baowu Steel Group.

==== Automotive ====
China is the world's largest automobile producer, manufacturing more than 31.28 million vehicles in 2024, with 5.86 million of those being exported overseas. As of 2024, China is the world's largest automobile market in terms of both sales and ownership. Due to rapid advancements by Chinese companies, China's automotive industry is regarded as one of the most competitive and innovative in the world.

Automobile manufacturing has soared during the reform and opening up period. In 1975 only 139,800 automobiles were produced annually, but by 1985 production had reached 443,377, then jumped to nearly 1.1 million by 1992 and increased fairly evenly each year up until 2001, when it reached 2.3 million. By 2006 China had become the world's third largest automotive vehicle manufacturer and the second-largest consumer. By 2010, China was manufacturing more vehicles than the U.S. and Japan combined. Domestic sales have kept pace with production. After respectable annual increases in the mid- and late 1990s, passenger car sales soared in the early 2000s. In 2010, China became the world's largest automotive vehicle manufacturer as well as the largest consumer ahead of the United States with an estimated 18 million new cars sold.

China began exporting car parts in 1999. China began to plan major moves into the automobile and components export business starting in 2005. By 2004, twelve major foreign automotive manufacturers had joint-venture plants in China. They produced a wide range of automobiles, minivans, sport utility vehicles, buses, and trucks. In 2003, China exported US$4.7 billion worth of vehicles and components. The vehicle export was 78,000 units in 2004, 173,000 units in 2005, and 340,000 units in 2006. China's exports of cars increased significantly since 2020, boosted by new energy vehicles. It overtook Germany and Japan in 2022 and 2023 respectively in vehicle exports, becoming the world's largest exporter of cars.

==== Cement ====
China is the largest cement producer in the world. As of 2004, it was responsible for 60% of cement global production. In 2017, China produced 2,400,000 metric tons of cement, whereas other countries produced about 1,728,300 metric tons.

Cement production adds one ton of carbon dioxide (CO_{2}) per ton of cement. According to engineering company FLSmidth, in order to heat a cement kiln with waste, about three times more waste is needed than the amount of coal used, reducing emissions by only about 10%. However, the Chinese cement industry has improved energy efficiency. In 2017, it accounted for 57% of the global industry's output, but only 52% of its emissions. However, the emission reductions from energy efficiency measures are vague compared to those that could be achieved with innovative technologies such as carbon capture and storage (CCS), which sequesters emissions.

==== Advanced materials ====
As an important part of the national sustainable development strategy, the development of advanced materials is advancing the competitive nature and state of the art for Chinese industry. The State has put advanced materials high on its development agenda for the next decade and listed it among the key high-tech industry sectors that would be given priority for development by the State Council. At present, the pace of building China's advanced materials industry is accelerating. Advanced materials have been key fields in China's national R&D system (National High Technology Research and Development Program (863 Program) and National Basic Research Program (973 Program)).

==== Chemical ====
The chemical industry in the People's Republic of China valued at around $1.75 trillion in 2014. The country is currently the largest chemicals manufacturer in the world.

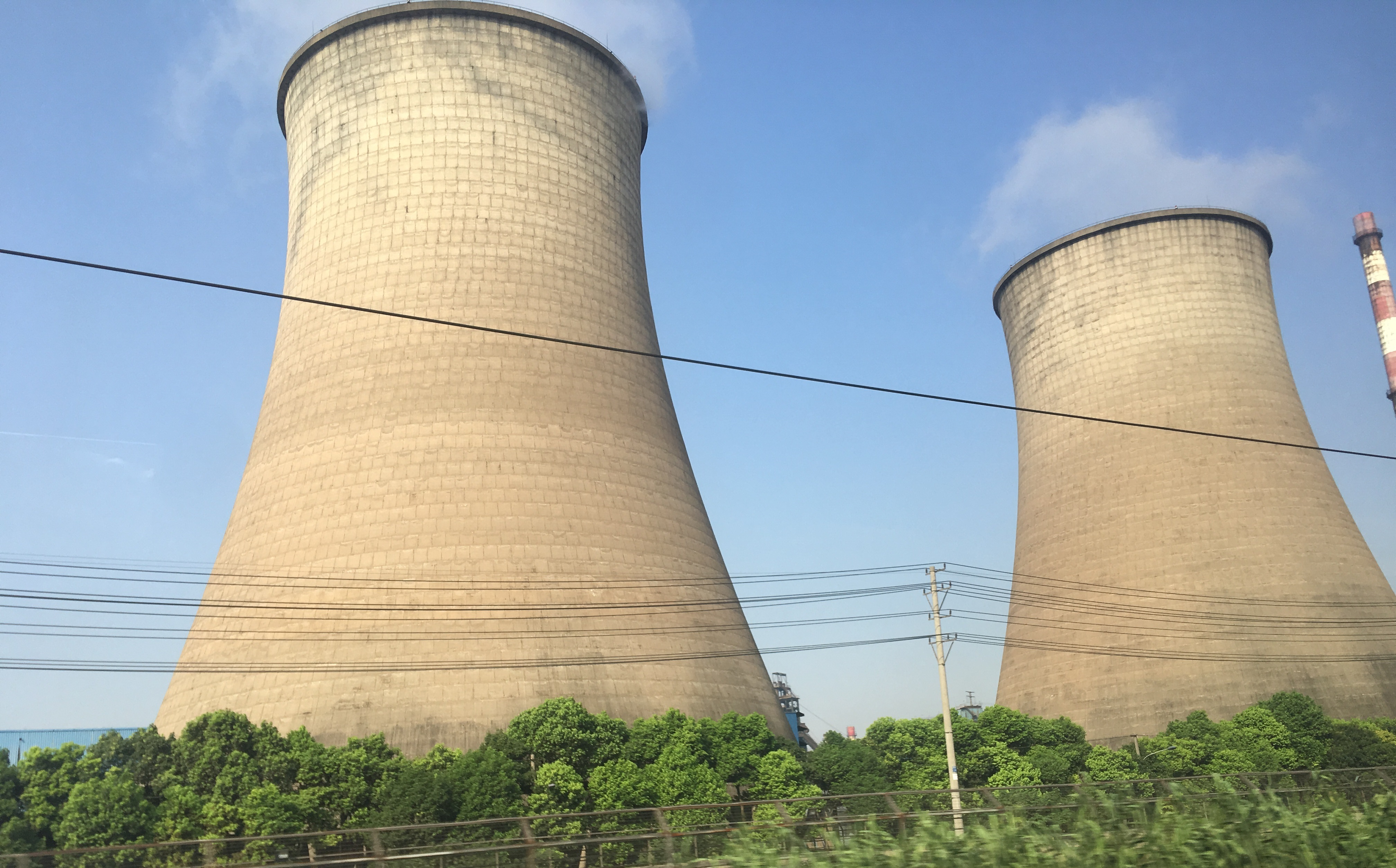

The chemical industry is central to modern China's economy. It uses special methods to alter the structure, composition or synthesis of substances to produce new products, such as steel, plastic, and ethyl. The chemical industry provides building materials for China's infrastructure, including subway, high-speed train, and highway.

Prior to 1978, most of the products were produced by the state-owned enterprises, but the share in product output from state-owned business has since decreased.

The Chinese chemical industry is also one of the world's largest producers of both controlled and non-controlled precursor chemicals used in the Global illicit drug trade, particularly in the Golden Triangle, Mexico, Latin America and Europe, with large volumes of these substances being traded through the growing research chemical (RC) industry online through social media and on B2B platforms and the dark web.

==== Defence and aerospace ====
China's defence industry is a rapidly advancing, state-driven sector, ranking as the top-four global arms exporter and focusing on high-tech aerospace, shipbuilding and missile systems. Fueled by massive, yet sometimes opaque investment nearing approximately US$300–470 billion annually, it seeks technological superiority by 2027 while facing internal structural challenges, corruption and recent industry revenue declines. It is mainly dominated by state-owned enterprises (SOEs) such as Norinco (land systems), AVIC (aircraft) and China State Shipbuilding Corporation (CSSC).

==== Electric vehicle ====
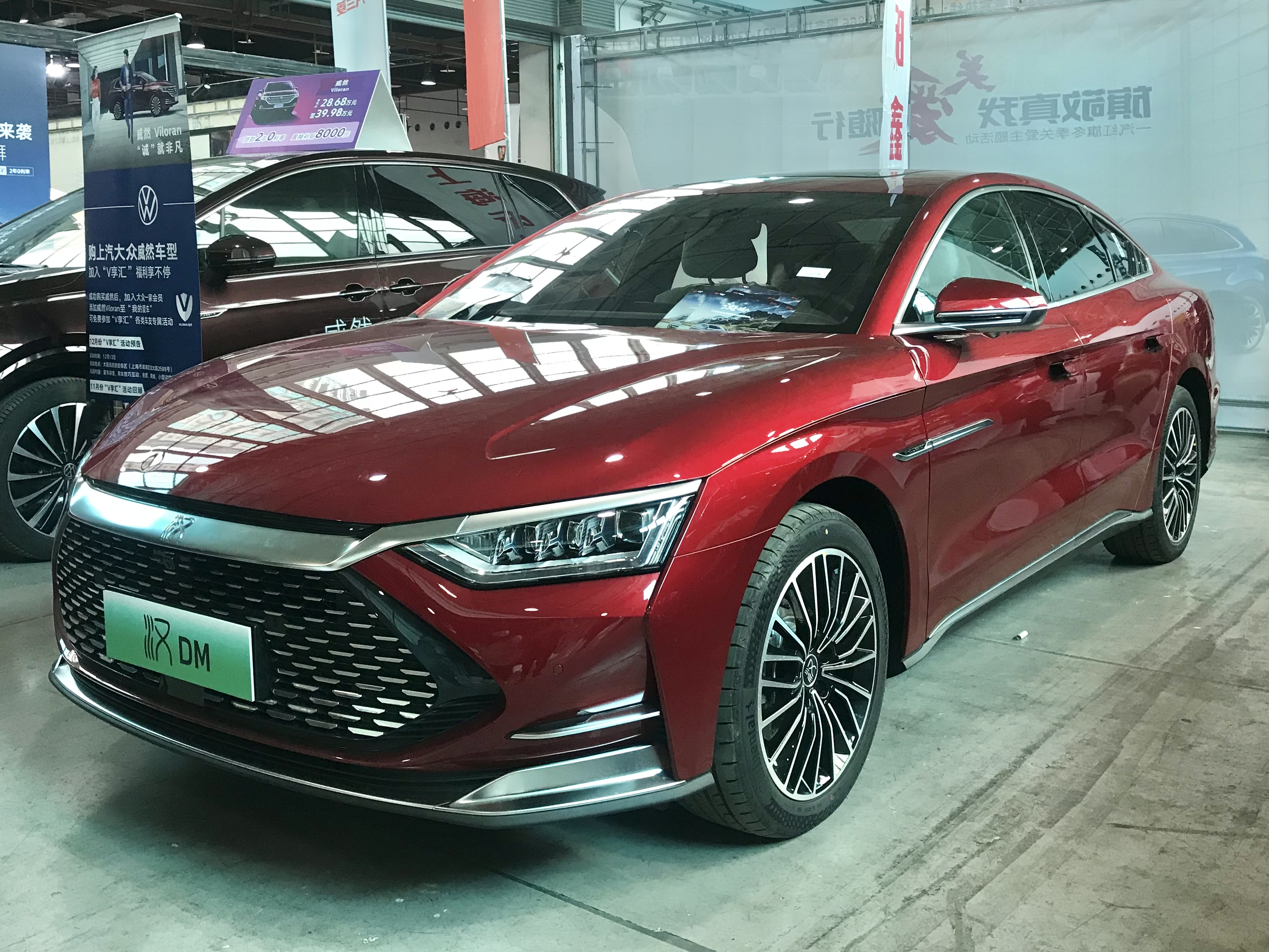
BYD with Dual Mode hybrid engine

The electric vehicle industry in China is the largest in the world, accounting for around 58% of global consumption of EVs. In 2023, CAAM reported China had sold 9.05 million passenger electric vehicles, consisting of 6.26 million BEVs (battery-only EVs) and 2.79 million PHEV (plug-in hybrid electric vehicles). China also dominates the plug-in electric bus and light commercial vehicle market, reaching over 500,000 buses (98% of global stock) and 247,500 electric commercial vehicles (65% of global stock) in 2019, and recording new sales of 447,000 commercial EVs in 2023.

Plug-in electric vehicle (BEV and PHEV) sales were 37% of the overall automotive sales in China in 2023, with BEVs and PHEVs having 25% and 12% market share respectively. This is a significant increase from 2020, when plug-in electric vehicles accounted for only 6.3% of total sales. The plug-in market in China was dominated by Chinese companies, with BYD Auto and SAIC Motor occupying the top two spots, and 5 out of the top 7 spots.

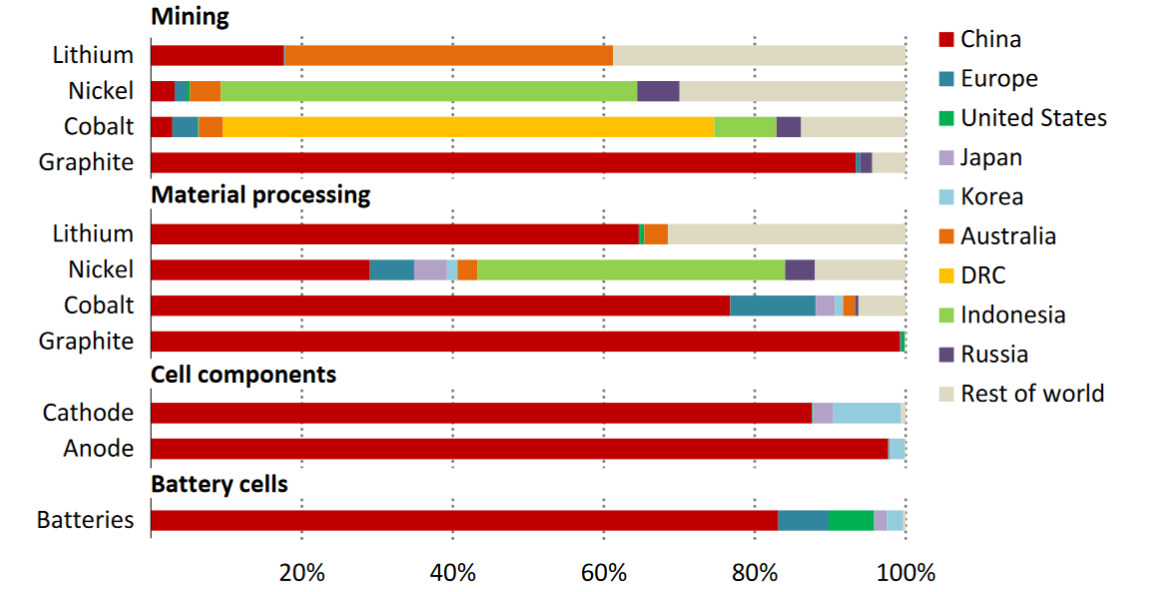
Geographical distribution of the global battery supply chain in 2024.

The battery industry is closely related to the EV industry as batteries constitute around 1/3 of the cost of EVs and around 80% of lithium-ion batteries in the world are used in EVs. The industry also has significant Chinese presence, with major players including world's largest CATL, BYD, CALB, Gotion, SVOLT and WeLion.

==== Semiconductor ====
The Chinese semiconductor industry, including IC design and manufacturing, forms a major part of China's IT industry. China's semiconductor industry consists of a wide variety of companies, from integrated device manufacturers to pure-play foundries to fabless semiconductor companies. Integrated device manufacturers (IDMs) design and manufacture integrated circuits. Pure-play foundries only manufacture devices for other companies, without designing them, while fabless semiconductor companies only design devices. Examples of Chinese IDMs are YMTC and CXMT, examples of Chinese pure-play foundries are SMIC, Hua Hong Semiconductor and Wingtech, and examples of Chinese fabless companies are Zhaoxin, HiSilicon and UNISOC.

China is the currently the world's largest semiconductor market in terms of consumption. In 2020, China represented 53.7% of worldwide chip sales, or $239.45 billion out of $446.1 billion. However, a large percentage are imported from multinational suppliers. In 2020, imports took up 83.38% ($199.7 billion) of total chip sales. In response, the country has launched a number of initiatives to close the gap, including investing $150 billion into its domestic IC industry, with a "Made in China 2025" goal of 70% domestic production. China leads the world in terms of number of new fabs under construction, with 8 out of 19 worldwide in 2021, and 17 fabs in total are expected to start construction from 2021 to 2023. Total installed capacity of Chinese-owned chipmakers will also increase from 2.96 million wafers per month (wpm) in 2020 to 3.572 million wpm in 2021.

==== Electronics ====
The electronics industry in the People's Republic of China grew rapidly after the reform and opening up under the national strategic policy of accelerating the "informatization" of its industrial development. Subsequently, labour costs have risen and creating wealth for citizens. The industry has been a major contribution to the modernization of China and the development of new job opportunities. There are many instances of labour exploitation and subpar working conditions.

In 2005, China's electronic information sector made up 16.6% of the country's economic growth and its added-value output formed 7% of the GDP. Manufacturing was the sector that grew the fastest.

As of 2011, China is the world's largest market for personal computers.

Major Chinese electronics companies include BOE, Changhong, DJI, Haier, Hisense, Huawei, Konka, Lenovo (Hong Kong–based), Meizu, Oppo, Panda Electronics, Skyworth, SVA, TCL, Vivo, Xiaomi and ZTE.

China's production recorded the largest world market share for its electronics exports in 2016. It also recorded high volume outputs across a wide spectrum of consumer electronics; between 2014 and 2015—according to China Daily—286.2 million personal computers (90.6% of the global supply), 1.77 billion phones (70.6% of global supply of smartphones) and 109 million units (80% of global supply of air conditioners) were produced.

==== Pharmaceutical ====
The pharmaceutical industry is one of the leading industries in the People's Republic of China, covering synthetic chemicals and drugs, prepared Chinese medicines, medical devices, apparatus and instruments, hygiene materials, packing materials, and pharmaceutical machinery. China has the second-largest pharmaceutical market in the world as of 2017 which is worth US$110 billion. China accounts for 20% of the world's population but only a small fraction of the global drug market. China's changing health-care environment is designed to extend basic health insurance to a larger portion of the population and give individuals greater access to products and services. Following the period of change, the pharmaceutical industry is expected to continue its expansion.

China, as of 2007, has around 3,000 to 6,000 domestic pharmaceutical manufacturers and around 14,000 domestic pharmaceutical distributors. The most often-cited adverse factors in the marketplace include a lack of protection of intellectual property rights, a lack of visibility for drug approval procedures, a lack of effective governmental oversight, poor corporate support for drug research, and differences in the treatment in China that are accorded to local and foreign firms.

Research and development are increasing, with Shanghai becoming one of the most important global drug research centers. Most notably, Novartis is expected to establish a large Research and development base in Shanghai that will be a pillar of its drug development.

==== Shipping ====
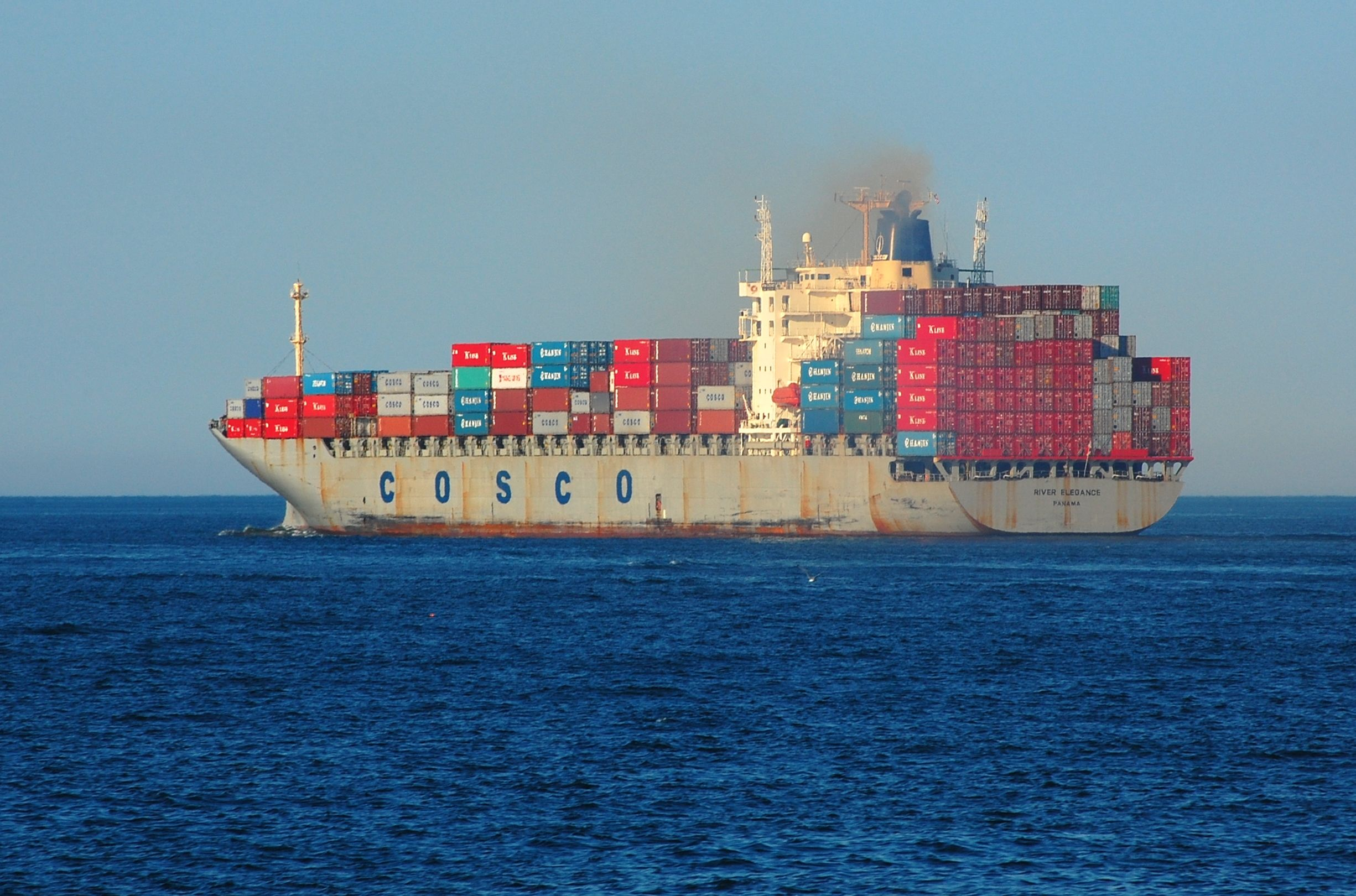
A COSCO container ship sails from Boston Harbor.

In 1961 China established a state-run maritime shipping company and subsequently signed shipping agreements with many countries, laying the foundation for developing the country's ocean transport. That organization developed into the present-day China Ocean Shipping (Group) Company (COSCO). The Chinese government also invested heavily in water transport infrastructure, constructing new ports and rebuilding and enlarging older facilities.

A major effort has also been made to increase mechanization and containerization at major international ports.

China's shipping industry and container transportation have reached international standards both in handling efficiency and building networks.

The governmental responsibility of the shipping industry is under the Ministry of Transport.

The number of container units handled by Chinese ports in 2011 reached more than 150 million. The country also manufactures 90% of the world's containers.

The throughput of cargo and containers at China's ports has been the largest in the world for the past five years, with an annual growth rate of 35%.

==== Other industries ====
Substantial investments were made in the manufacture of solar panels and wind generators by a number of companies, supported by liberal loans by banks and local governments. However, by 2012 manufacturing capacity had far outstripped domestic and global demand for both products, particularly solar panels, which were subjected to anti-dumping penalties by both the United States and Europe. The global oversupply has resulted in bankruptcies and production cutbacks both inside and outside China. China has budgeted $50 billion to subsidize production of solar power over the two decades following 2015.

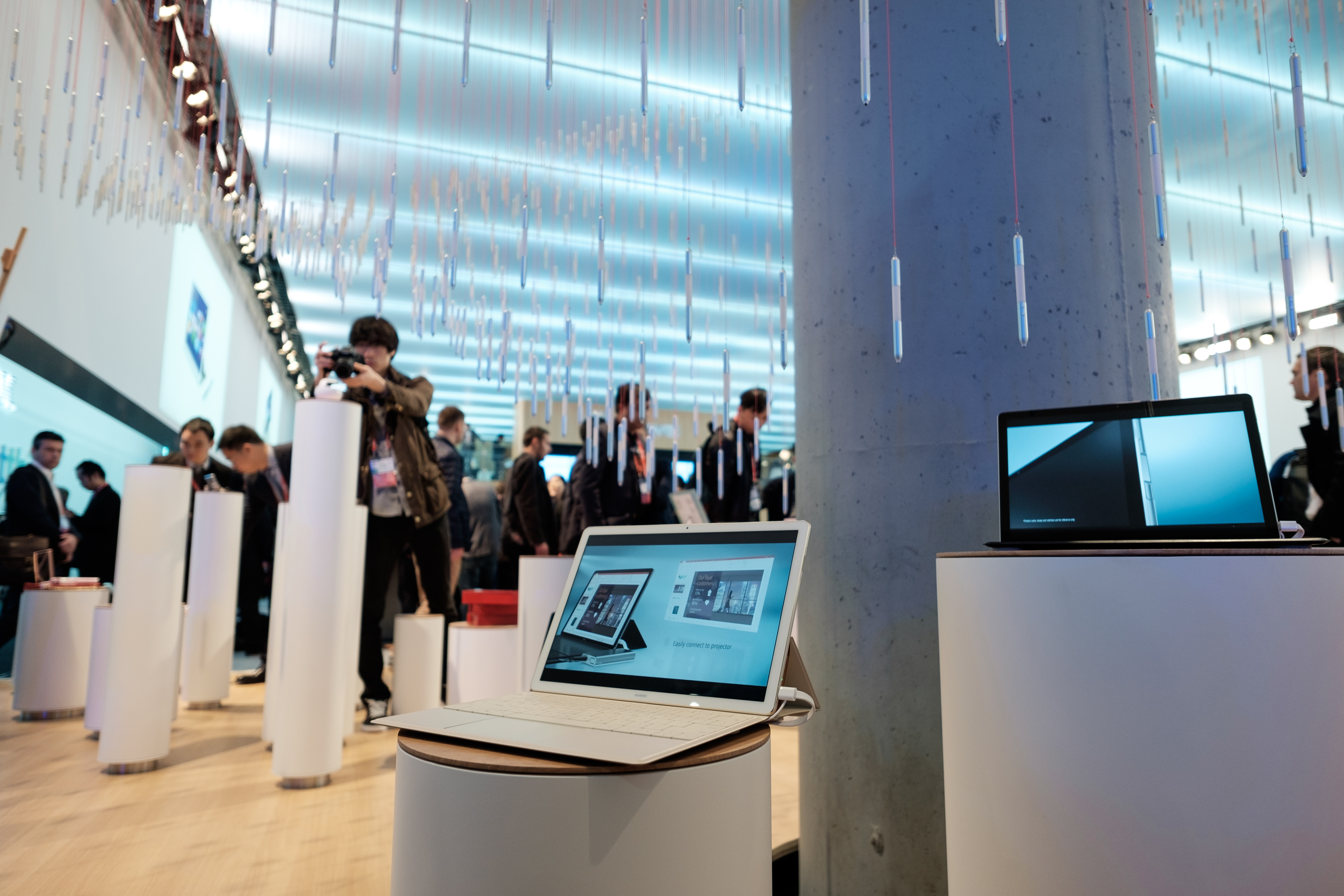
Huawei MateBook series at a World Mobile Congress

China is the world's biggest sex toy producer and accounts for 70% of the worldwide sex toys production. In the country, 1,000 manufacturers are active in this industry, which generates about two billion dollars a year. As of 2011, China was the world's largest market for personal computers. China has the second-largest reserve of computers in the world as of 2024.

=== Services ===
Prior to the onset of economic reforms in 1978, China's services sector was characterized by state-operated shops, rationing, and regulated prices – with reform came private markets, individual entrepreneurs, and a commercial sector. The wholesale and retail trade has expanded quickly, with numerous shopping malls, retail shops, restaurant chains and hotels constructed in urban areas. Public administration remains a main component of the service sector, while tourism has become a significant factor in employment and a source of foreign exchange.

==== Telecommunications ====
The affordability of mobile phones and internet data in China has resulted in the number of mobile internet users in China surpassing the number of computer internet users. By 2023, the number of Internet users in China increased to over 1.09 billion. The proportions of Chinese netizens accessing the Internet via mobile phones, desktop computers, laptop computers, TVs and tablet computers were 99.9%, 33.9%, 30.3%, 22.5% and 26.6%, respectively.

==== Consumer retailing and hospitality ====
China's economy is one of the world's leaders in consumer retailing, consumer internet and mobile payments. As of 2024, China has more internet users than any other country. Internet users in China generate large amounts of data, thereby providing a competitive benefit in the development of machine learning for artificial intelligence technology. Mobile payment methods via apps including Alipay and WeChat Pay were quickly adopted in China in part due to the relative lack of credit cards in the country. This technological leapfrogging also led to a boom in online shopping and retail banking.

==== Platform economy ====
China's platform economy has grown substantially since the early 2010s, with its transactional volume reaching RMB 3.7 trillion in 2021. The platform economy has absorbed a large number of workers from China's decreasing manufacturing workforce and from its population of internal migrant workers. As of 2020, 84 million people worked as platform economy service providers and 6 million were employees of platform companies.

The platform economy sector is highly concentrated in Alibaba and Tencent, both of which have ride-hailing and food delivery businesses as key assets in their investment portfolios. Ride-hailing and food delivery businesses have significantly consolidated since 2016.

The New York Times described both Alibaba and Tencent as China's two dominant internet giants competing to control daily life through e-commerce, payments, and social media. In mobile payments, many companies have to partner with Alibaba's Alipay or Tencent's platform services. They also control major apps and payment platforms, which limits competition in the digital space. Both Alibaba and Tencent are recognized as tech giants that are driving innovation in e-commerce, social networking, and mobile services. Alibaba generates the majority of its revenue from e-commerce platforms like Taobao and Tmall, while Tencent derives most of its revenue from social services like WeChat, gaming, and fintech.

==== Education ====
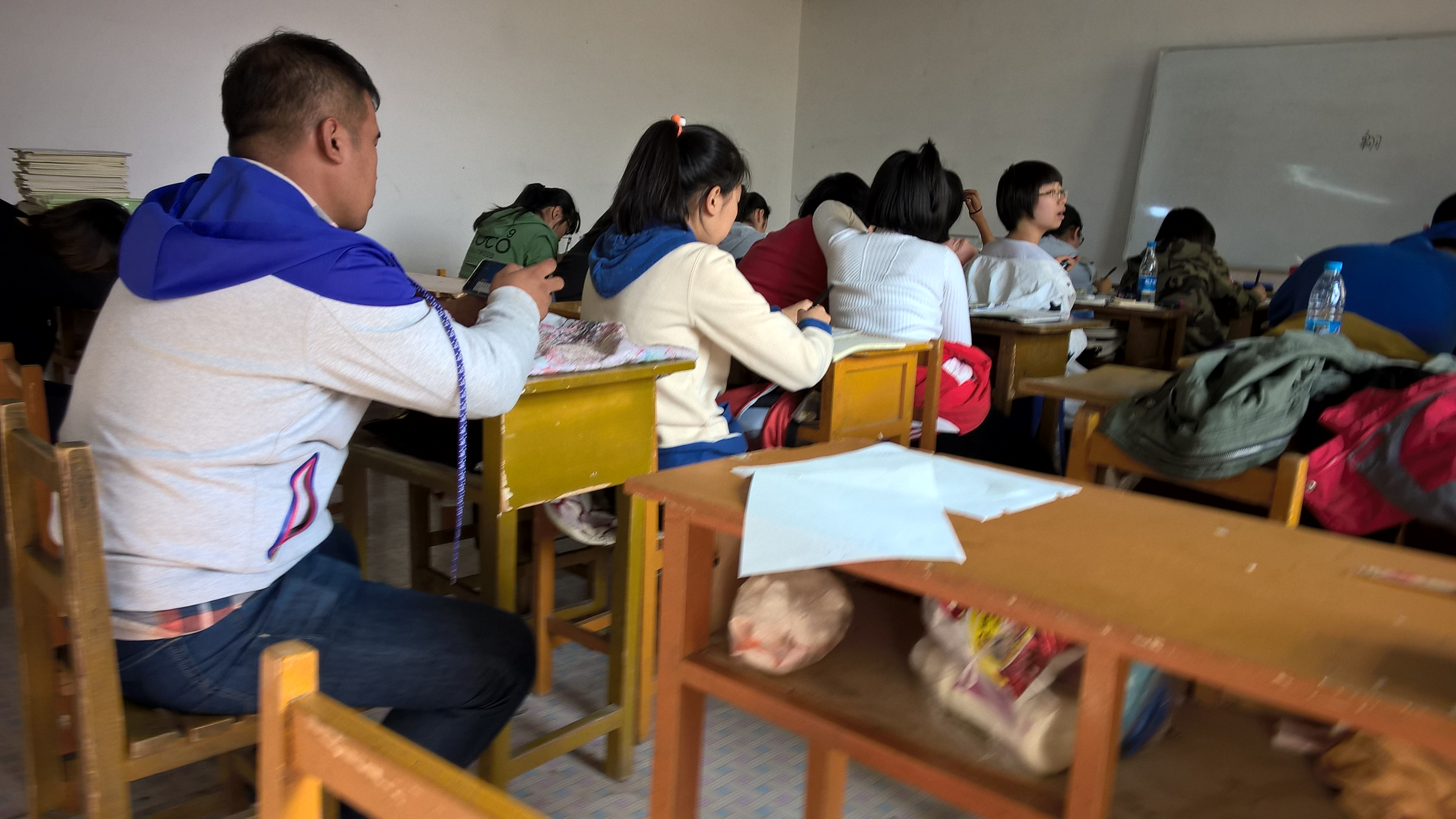
Students in Tieling

Education in the People's Republic of China is primarily managed by the state-run public education system, which falls under the Ministry of Education. By law, education in the People's Republic of China is led by the Chinese Communist Party (CCP) and adheres to its ideology. All citizens must attend school for a minimum of nine years, known as nine-year compulsory education, which is funded by the government through the national education budget.

Compulsory education includes six years of elementary school, typically starting at the age of six and finishing at the age of twelve, followed by three years of middle school. A middle school graduate may choose to continue their secondary education for three more years in a high school or a vocational school.

In 2020, the Ministry of Education reported an increase of new entrants of 34.4 million students entering compulsory education, bringing the total number of students who attend compulsory education to 156 million.

In 1985, the government abolished tax-funded higher education, requiring university applicants to compete for scholarships based on their academic capabilities. In the early 1980s, the government allowed the establishment of the first private institution of higher learning, thus increasing the number of undergraduates and people who hold doctoral degrees from 1995 to 2005.

Chinese investment in research and development has grown by 20 percent per year since 1999, exceeding $100 billion in 2011. As many as 1.5 million science and engineering students graduated from Chinese universities in 2006. By 2008, China had published 184,080 papers in recognized international journals – a seven-fold increase from 1996. In 2017, China surpassed the U.S. with the highest number of scientific publications. In 2021, there were 3,012 universities and colleges (see List of universities in China) in China, and 147 National Key Universities, which are considered to be part of an elite group Double First Class universities, accounted for approximately 4.6% of all higher education institutions in China.

China has also been a top destination for international students and as of 2013, China was the most popular country in Asia for international students and ranked third overall among countries. China is now the leading destination globally for Anglophone African students and is host of the second largest international students population in the world. As of 2025, there were 2 Chinese universities in the global top 20, 5 in the top 50, and 19 in the top 200, behind only the United States and the United Kingdom in terms of the overall representation in the Aggregate Ranking of Top Universities, a composite ranking system combining three of the world's most influential university rankings (ARWU+QS+ THE).

Chinese students in the country's most developed regions are among the best performing in the world in the Programme for International Student Assessment (PISA). Shanghai, Beijing, Jiangsu and Zhejiang outperformed all other education systems in the PISA. According to estimates from The Economist in 2026, China would have scored among the highest even if every single province had taken part in the test. For example, the country's math score would have been 536, the fourth highest in the world, while its average score across all three subjects would have been 501, the seventh highest in the world. China's educational system has been noted for its emphasis on rote memorization and test preparation. However, PISA spokesman Andreas Schleicher says that China has moved away from learning by rote in recent years. According to Schleicher, Russia performs well in rote-based assessments, but not in PISA, whereas China does well in both rote-based and broader assessments.

==== Healthcare ====
Healthcare in the People's Republic of China is primarily provided by state-owned hospitals, with medical insurance administered primarily by local governments. As of 2020, about 95% of the population has at least basic health insurance coverage.

Medical insurances are subdivided into employee and resident insurance. The former covers the urban employed population, and the latter covers the urban non-employed population and the rural population. A total of 25% of the people covered by the basic medical insurance participated in the employee medical insurance, a total of 344 million people; 75% participated in the residents' medical insurance, a total of 1.017 billion people. Medical assistance has subsidized 78 million poor people to participate in basic medical insurance, and the coverage of poor people has stabilized at over 99.9%.

Despite this, public health insurance generally only covers about half of medical costs, with the proportion lower for serious or chronic illnesses. Under the "Healthy China 2020" initiative, China undertook an effort to cut healthcare costs, requiring insurance to cover 70% of costs by the end of 2018. In addition, there are policies such as critical illness insurance and medical assistance. China's commercial health insurance is also proliferating. In 2020, the country's commercial health insurance premium income amounted to 817.3 billion yuan, with an average annual growth rate of 20%. China's coverage of maternity insurance has continued to expand, by the end of 2020, 235.673 million people were insured under maternity insurance.

The country maintains two parallel medical systems, one for modern or Western medicine, and one for Traditional Chinese medicine (TCM). Some Chinese consider TCM backward and ineffective, others consider it inexpensive, effective, and culturally appropriate. China has also become a major market for health-related multinational companies. Companies such as AstraZeneca, GlaxoSmithKline, Eli Lilly, and Merck entered the Chinese market and have experienced explosive growth. China has also become a growing hub for healthcare research and development. According to Sam Radwan of ENHANCE International, China's projected healthcare spending in 2050 may exceed Germany's entire 2020 gross domestic product.

The special administrative regions of Hong Kong and Macau maintain their own separate universal healthcare systems.

==== Housing and real estate ====
In 2010, China became the world's largest market for construction. It has remained the world's largest through at least 2024. The real estate industry is about 20% of the Chinese economy. As of 2023, real property accounts for 60% of Chinese household assets. Also as of 2023, China has the highest rate of home ownership in the world. 90% of urban households own their home.

Compared to other nations, investing in stock markets and other assets is harder due to currency controls within the country. As a result, many Chinese citizens own multiple properties, as they are one of the few ways in which it is comparatively easy to grow and preserve wealth. Due to this, many economists have speculated about a property bubble within the Chinese economy. On 16 July 2020, The Wall Street Journal reported that the housing market within the Chinese economy had grown to US$52 trillion, eclipsing the US 2008 housing market before the 2008 financial crisis.

==== Mass media ====
In 2020, China's market for Chinese films surpassed the U.S. market to become the largest such market in the world. Domestic movies dominate the Chinese market.

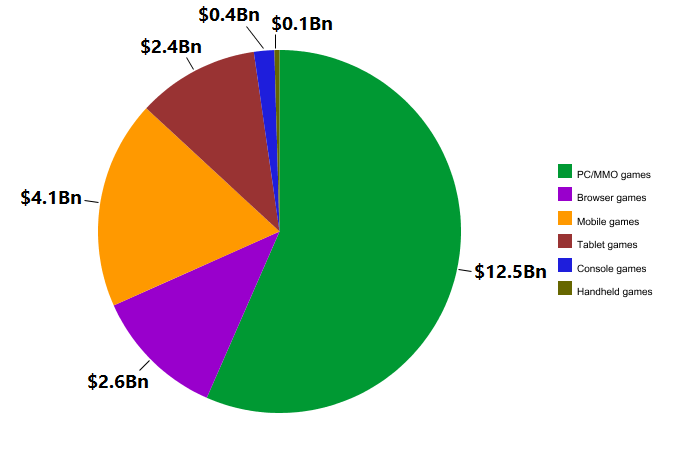
Games market of China by revenue per platform in 2015

The video game industry in China currently is one of the major markets for the global video game industry, where more than half a billion people play video games. Revenues from China make up around 25% of the nearly US$100 billion global video game industry as of 2018. Since 2015, China has exceeded the contribution to the global market from the United States. Because of its market size, China has been described as the "Games Industry Capital of the World" and is home to some of the largest video game companies. China has also been a major factor in the growth of esports, both in player talent and in revenue.

==== Tourism ====
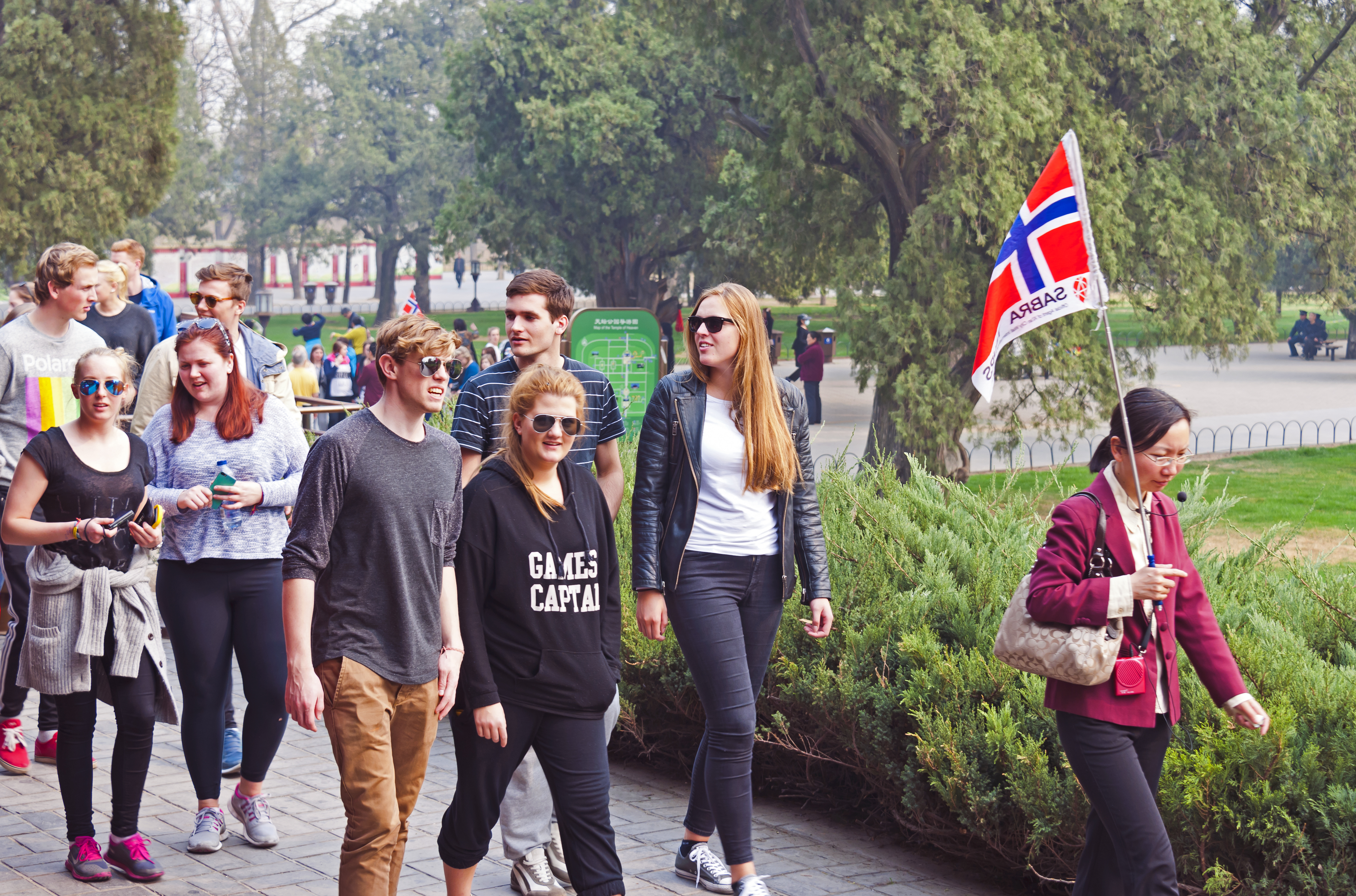
A guide leads a group of Norwegian tourists to the Temple of Heaven in Beijing

China hosts the world's second largest number of World Heritage Sites (59). China's tourism industry is one of the fastest-growing industries in the national economy and is also one of the industries with a very distinct global competitive edge. According to the World Travel and Tourism Council, travel and tourism directly contributed CNY 1,362 billion (US$216 billion) to the Chinese economy (about 2.6% of GDP). In 2011, total international tourist arrivals was 58 million, and international tourism receipts were US$48 billion.

The Chinese tourism industry was hit hard by both the COVID-19 lockdowns and strained relations with many foreign nations. Foreign flights into China, both for business and tourism are way down, especially from the US. Recent much increased internal security activity decreases the desire of foreigners to live in China, or to go to China, for fear of being targeted and not allowed to leave. Thus many foreigners are leaving and others crossing it off as a travel destination.

==== Luxury goods ====
Hong Kong and Macau benefit from favorable taxation rules and are favored locations for tourists from elsewhere in China to purchase luxury goods like cosmetics, jewelry, and designer fashion goods. Porcelain has long been one of China's most important luxury exports. It was especially important to early trade between China and the West, with much of that trade being conducted through Macau. Many shops in international travel destinations have specialized staff devoted to Chinese customers.

== Informal economy ==
The informal economy of the People's Republic of China refers to a range of informal economic activity that stands outside of the recognized systems of regulations, taxation, and licenses. Although the term is sometimes understood to describe marginal, unregulated, and even criminal activity, there is considerable overlap between the informal sector and formal economy, and the informal economy serves an important societal function in contributing to employment and economic growth.

The informal economy in China represents a large portion of domestic output, consumption and employment. Employment in the urban sector represents a major part of the Chinese economy: approximately half of urban Chinese workers belong to the informal economy as of 2004.—a significant increase since the 1990s. It is described as fast-growing, dynamic, highly competitive, and it contributes substantially to economic growth. However, there are serious concerns about the lack of protections afforded to workers in the informal sector.

In addition, China is a major part of the global informal sector, producing unregulated goods for consumption in Africa, Latin America, and elsewhere. According to Roberta Neuwirth, China's rise as a global center of manufacturing owes, in part, to its willingness to trade in the informal economy, also known as system D trade. In some regions in China, local governments have adopted policies designed to encourage the informal economy to alleviate unemployment.

== Income and wealth ==
China has the largest national proportion of the global middle class. As of 2020, China had 400 million middle-income citizens. It is projected to reach 1.2 billion by 2027, making up one fourth of the world total. According to a 2021 Pew Research Center survey, there were 23 million Chinese individuals with a per capita daily income of $50 or more, 242 million with a daily income between $20–50 per day, 493 million between $10–20, 641 million $2–10 per day, and 4 million under $2 per day; all the figures are expressed in international dollars and 2011 purchasing power parity values. In 2022, the National Bureau of Statistics reported that China's average disposable income per capita was ¥36,883, of which ¥20,590 was from wages and salaries, ¥6,175 was net business income, ¥3,227 was net income from property, and ¥6,892 was net transfer income. The median per capita disposable income was reported as ¥36,231 with a 4.4% annual growth for 2025.

As of April 2023, China was second in the world, after the US, in total number of billionaires and total number of millionaires, with 495 Chinese billionaires and 6.2 million millionaires in 2022. According to the Hurun Global Rich Report In 2020, China had the world's highest number of billionaires, which is more than the US and India combined, and as of March 2021, the number of billionaires in China reach 1,058 with the combined wealth of US$4.5 trillion. According to the 2019 Global Wealth Report by Credit Suisse Group, China surpassed the US in the wealth of the top ten percent of the world's population. (Note: China had a hundred million wealthy people (each owning a net wealth of over US$110,000) and the US 99 million. At US$63.8 trillion as of end of 2019, representing a 17-fold increase from US$3.7 trillion in 2001, the total amount of China's household wealth stood behind only that of the US with US$105.6 trillion.) In other words, as of 2019, a hundred million Chinese are in the top ten percent of the wealthiest individuals in the world – those who have a net personal wealth of at least $110,000. According to the list in 2021, China is home to six of the world's top ten cities (Beijing, Shanghai, Shenzhen, Hong Kong, Hangzhou and Guangzhou in the 1st, 2nd, 4th, 5th, 8th and 9th spots, respectively) by the highest number of billionaires, which is more than any other country. As of January 2021, China had 85 female billionaires, two-thirds of the global total.

The average income of a rural resident in China is 30% of the average income for an urban resident. The rural population is relatively older as the rural youth migrate to cities for higher earning jobs while the aged stay behind. Much of this rural population works small plots of land in order to survive and have little earning power. Former Chinese Premier Li Keqiang stated, in 2020, that 600 million Chinese live on or under 1,000 yuan per month. At a conversion rate of 7 yuan to the dollar, this translates to $143 per month. A family of 3 at this income level would have a yearly income of $5,150. The difference in income is also a reflection of the difference in retirement payments to urban retirees versus rural retirees. Urban workers receive much more a month in retirement benefits on average compared to rural/farm workers who receive a pittance. Despite income inequality in China, the absolute income of nearly all income groups has risen quickly. From 1988 to 2018, China's rural and urban populations had per capita increases in real income (i.e., accounting for inflation) of 8–10 times.

China's economic growth led to a major decrease in world inequality. Since China's reform and opening up, more than 1 billion Chinese people have been lifted out of poverty. The majority of global poverty reduction between 1981 and 2008 occurred in China. As academic Lan Xiaohuan writes, during that period, "the number of poor people in the world outside China remained more or less unchanged. It can therefore be concluded that achievements in global poverty reduction come mainly from China." The historical consensus is that the policies of the post-Mao era significantly reduced poverty. Nevertheless, under Mao, according to Sullivan et al., "China's government provided food and shelter at little or no cost. This meant US$1.90 was able to buy more basic necessities in China than in comparable capitalist countries."

In terms of domestic saving, defined as combined saving of households, businesses, and governments, China is the world's largest saving country as of 2022.

=== Wages ===
In 1979–1980, the state reformed factories by giving wage increases to workers, which was immediately offset by sharply rising inflation rates of 6–7%. Urban wages rose rapidly from 2004 to 2007, at a rate of 13 to 19% per year with average wages near $200/month in 2007. By 2016 the average monthly wage for workers engaged in manufacturing goods for export was $424. This wage, combined with other costs of doing business in China, had, more or less, equalized any Chinese cost advantage with respect to developed economies.

=== Taxes ===
The government's tax revenues primarily result from indirect taxes like the value added tax. China's personal income tax accounts for about 6.5% of tax revenues, as of 2024. It is a progressive tax, with the top income tax bracket is taxed at 45% of income.

=== Inequality ===
The economy of the People's Republic of China has a high degree of income inequality. According to the Asian Development Bank Institute, "before China implemented reform and opening-up policies in 1978, its income distribution pattern was characterized as egalitarian in all aspects."

A study published in the Proceedings of the National Academy of Sciences of the United States of America (PNAS) estimated that China's Gini coefficient increased from 0.30 to 0.55 between 1980 and 2002. At this time, the Gini coefficient for rural–urban inequality was only 0.16. As of 2019, the official Gini coefficient in China was 0.465; inequality was at its highest in the 2000s, with numerous sources reporting a significant decline in the 2010s.

=== Welfare ===
Welfare in the People's Republic of China is linked to the hukou system of household registration. Those holding non-agricultural hukou status have access to a number of programs provided by the government, such as healthcare, employment, retirement pensions, housing, and education. While rural residents traditionally were expected to provide for themselves, in 2014, the Chinese Communist Party announced reforms aimed at providing rural citizens access to historically urban social programs.

Social assistance includes both monetary and health care benefits. Poverty reduction programs exist in parallel to social assistance; poverty reduction programs have separate administration and budgets.

== External trade ==
Exports of China by product category (2019) Chemical products Transportation Machines Mineral products Plastics and rubbers Metals Foodstuffs Precious metals Textiles Instruments Animal products Vegetable products Paper goods Footwear and headwear Miscellaneous Stone and glass Wood products Animal and vegetable bi-products Animal hides Arts and antiques Weapons

China's share of global export 1990–2019

International trade makes up a sizeable portion of China's overall economy. Since 2018, firms have begun a broad reorganisation of supply chains away from China, with 244 documented relocation decisions between 2018 and 2023; Vietnam, Taiwan, the United States, Mexico, Thailand and India were the principal destinations, and only 15.6% of moves constituted reshoring to the home country. Companies predominantly pursued "China-plus-many" strategies that spread production across multiple countries rather than exiting China altogether, with two-thirds (66.4%) of moves involving multi-country portfolios. Executive statements most frequently cited geopolitical tensions (164 mentions) and increases in US-facing tariffs (163) as triggers for relocation, alongside cost and COVID-19 constraints.

In 2010, China became the world's largest exporter, and has continued to be the world's largest exporter as of 2023. It has free trade agreements with several nations, including ASEAN, Australia, Cambodia, New Zealand, Pakistan, South Korea and Switzerland. By 2020, China became the largest trading partner of more than 120 countries. As of 2022, China's largest trading partners are ASEAN, the European Union, Japan, South Korea, Taiwan, Australia, Russia, Brazil, India, Canada, and the United Kingdom.

During the Cold War, a meaningful segment of China's trade with the Third World was financed through grants, credits, and other forms of assistance. However, after Mao Zedong's death in 1976, these efforts were scaled back. After which, trade with developing countries became negligible, though during that time, Hong Kong and Taiwan both began to emerge as major trading partners.

Since economic reforms began in the late 1970s, China sought to decentralize its foreign trade system to integrate itself into the international trading system. In November 1991, China joined the Asia-Pacific Economic Cooperation (APEC) group, which promotes free trade and cooperation in the economic, trade, investment, and technology spheres. China served as APEC chair in 2001, and Shanghai hosted the annual APEC leaders meeting in October of that year.

China became a member of the World Trade Organization in 2001. The completion of its accession protocol and Working Party Report paved the way for its entry into the WTO on 11 December 2001, after 16 years of negotiations, the longest in the history of the General Agreement on Tariffs and Trade. However, U.S. exporters continue to have concerns about fair market access due to China's restrictive trade policies and U.S. export restrictions. In October 2019, Chinese Vice Premier Han Zheng promised to further decrease tariffs and remove non-tariff barriers for global investors, he also welcomed multinational companies to invest more in China.

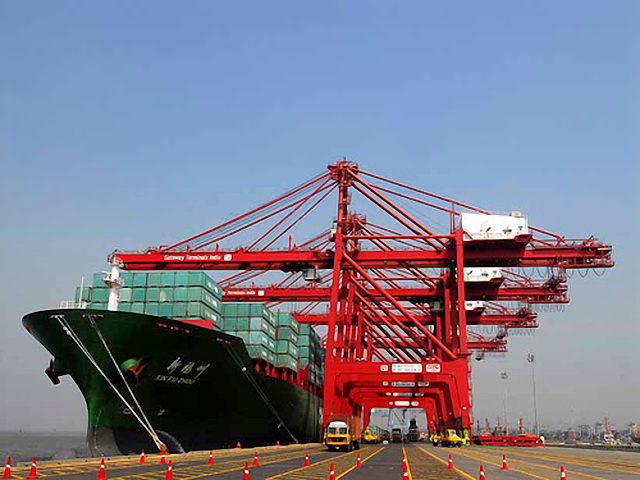
With bilateral trade exceeding US$38.6 billion, China is India's largest trading partner and shown here is a Chinese container ship unloading its cargo at Jawaharlal Nehru Port, Navi Mumbai, India

China's global trade exceeded $4.16 trillion at the end of 2013, having broken the hundred-billion mark in 1988 and half a trillion by 2001. China global trade exceeded US$6 trillion in 2021 The table below shows the average annual growth (in nominal US dollar terms) of China's foreign trade during the reform era:

Period	Two-way trade	Exports	Imports
1981–1985	+12.8%	+8.6%	+16.1%
1986–1990	+10.6%	+17.8%	+4.8%
1991–1995	+19.5%	+19.1%	+19.9%
1996–2000	+11.0%	+10.9%	+11.3%
2001–2005	+24.6%	+25.0%	+24.0%
2006–2010	+15.9%	+15.7%	+16.1%
2016–2021	+11.0%		

The vast majority of China's imports consists of industrial supplies and capital goods, notably machinery and high-technology equipment, the majority of which comes from the developed countries, primarily Japan and the United States. Regionally, almost half of China's imports come from East and Southeast Asia, and about a fourth of China's exports go to the same destinations. About 80 percent of China's exports consist of manufactured goods, most of which are textiles and electronic equipment, with agricultural products and chemicals constituting the remainder. Out of the five busiest ports in the world, three are in China. By 2022, trade between China and Russia reached a record $190 billion, with China becoming Russia's trading partner.

Export growth has continued to be a major component supporting China's rapid economic growth. To increase exports, China pursued policies such as fostering the rapid development of foreign-invested factories, which assembled imported components into consumer goods for export and liberalizing trading rights. Particularly since 2000, the product complexity of China's exports have increased. This has been driven both by increasing technical capabilities and infrastructure as well as factors like China's business and legal environment.

China is a member of the Regional Comprehensive Economic Partnership (RCEP), the world's largest free-trade area which was signed into agreement in November 2020. The RCEP, which includes China, Japan, South Korea, Australia, New Zealand and the ASEAN nations, represents about a third of the world's population and 29% of global gross domestic product. The RCEP aims to eliminate tariffs on a variety of products within 20 years. On 17 September 2021, China formally applied to join another large Asia-Pacific free-trade pact, the Comprehensive and Progressive Agreement for Trans-Pacific Partnership (CPTPP).

== Foreign investment ==
From 1992 until at least 2023, China has been either the number one or number two worldwide destination for foreign direct investment. In 2022, China attracted $180 billion. As of the end of June 2020, FDI stock in China reached US$2.947 trillion, and China's outgoing FDI stock stood at US$2.128 trillion. Relocation decisions in 2018–2023 often leveraged established supplier relationships—67% of recorded capacity shifts went to existing suppliers overall (including about 60% in Vietnam and about 90% in Mexico)—with a gradual rise in new-supplier entries as firms expanded or built dual supply chains. The total foreign financial assets owned by China reached US$7.860 trillion, and its foreign financial liabilities US$5.716 trillion, making China the second-largest creditor nation after Japan in the world.

China's investment climate has changed dramatically with more than two decades of reform. In the early 1980s, China restricted foreign investments to export-oriented operations and required foreign investors to form joint-venture partnerships with Chinese firms. The Encouraged Industry Catalogue sets out the degree of foreign involvement allowed in various industry sectors. From the beginning of the reforms legalizing foreign investment, capital inflows expanded every year until 1999. Foreign-invested enterprises account for 58–60% of China's imports and exports.

Since the early 1990s, the government has allowed foreign investors to manufacture and sell a wide range of goods on the domestic market, eliminated time restrictions on the establishment of joint ventures, provided some assurances against nationalization, allowed foreign partners to become chairs of joint venture boards, and authorized the establishment of wholly foreign-owned enterprises, now the preferred form of FDI. In 1991, China granted more preferential tax treatment for Wholly Foreign Owned Enterprises and contractual ventures and for foreign companies, which invested in selected economic zones or in projects encouraged by the state.

China also authorized some foreign banks to open branches in Shanghai and allowed foreign investors to purchase special "B" shares of stock in selected companies listed on the Shanghai and Shenzhen Securities Exchanges. These "B" shares sold to foreigners carried no ownership rights in a company. In 1997, China approved 21,046 foreign investment projects and received over $45 billion in foreign direct investment. China revised significantly its laws on Wholly Foreign-Owned Enterprises and China Foreign Equity Joint Ventures in 2000 and 2001. The Vice Minister of Finance Zhu Guangyao announced, foreign investors will be allowed to own up to 51% on domestic financial service companies. Formerly foreign ownership was limited to a 49% stake in these firms.

Foreign investment remains a strong element in China's rapid expansion in world trade and has been an important factor in the growth of urban jobs. China's economic leadership on global capital flows emphasizes long-term infrastructure and development finance over short-term flows which, under the current order, have imposed large costs on many economies. In 1998, foreign-invested enterprises produced about 40% of China's exports, and foreign exchange reserves totaled about $145 billion. Foreign-invested enterprises today produce about half of China's exports (the majority of China's foreign investment come from Hong Kong, Macau and Taiwan), and China continues to attract large investment inflows. However, the Chinese government's emphasis on guiding FDI into manufacturing has led to market saturation in some industries, while leaving China's services sectors underdeveloped. From 1993 to 2001, China was the world's second-largest recipient of foreign direct investment (FDI) after the United States, receiving $39 billion in 1999 and $41 billion in 2000. China is now one of the leading FDI recipients in the world, receiving almost $80 billion in 2005 according to World Bank statistics. In 2006, China received $69.47 billion. By 2011, with the U.S. seeing a decline in foreign investment following the 2008 financial crisis, China overtook it as the top destination for FDI, receiving over $280 billion that year.

Amid slowing economic conditions and a weakening yuan in 2015, December of that year saw a 5.8% drop in FDI to China. While China's rank as the top receiver of FDI continued through 2014, the slowing of inbound investment in 2015 combined with a massive rebound in foreign investment to the United States resulted in the U.S. reclaiming its position as the top investment destination. Data from the American Chamber of Commerce in China's 2016 China Business Climate Survey confirms this trend, although it also demonstrates that China remains a top investment destination. This survey of over 500 members found that "China remains a top three investment priority for six out of ten member companies," though this is a decline from the 2012 high of eight out of ten respondents considering China a top priority.

Foreign exchange reserves totaled $155 billion in 1999 and $165 billion in 2000. Foreign exchange reserves exceeded $800 billion in 2005, more than doubling from 2003. Foreign exchange reserves were $819 billion at the end of 2005, $1.066 trillion at the end of 2006, $1.9 trillion by June 2008. In addition, by the end of September 2008 China replaced Japan for the first time as the largest foreign holder of US treasury securities with a total of $585 billion, vs Japan $573 billion. China's foreign exchange reserves are the largest in the world.

As part of its WTO accession, China undertook to eliminate certain trade-related investment measures and to open up specified sectors that had previously been closed to foreign investment. New laws, regulations, and administrative measures to implement these commitments are being issued. Major remaining barriers to foreign investment include opaque and inconsistently enforced laws and regulations and the lack of a rules-based legal infrastructure. Warner Bros., for instance, withdrew its cinema business in China as a result of a regulation that requires Chinese investors to own at least a 51 percent stake or play a leading role in a foreign joint venture.

Another major development in the history of foreign investment in China was the establishment of the Shanghai Free Trade Zone in September 2013. The Zone is considered a testing ground for a number of economic and social reforms. Critically, foreign investment is controlled via a "negative list" approach, where FDI is permitted in all sectors unless explicitly prohibited by the inclusion of a given sector on the negative list published by the Shanghai Municipal Government.

On 15 March 2019, China's National People's Congress adopted the Foreign Investment Law, which came into effect on 1 January 2020. Foreign investment in China comes with a number of ethical risks which pose major challenges which investors must navigate.

=== Chinese investment abroad ===
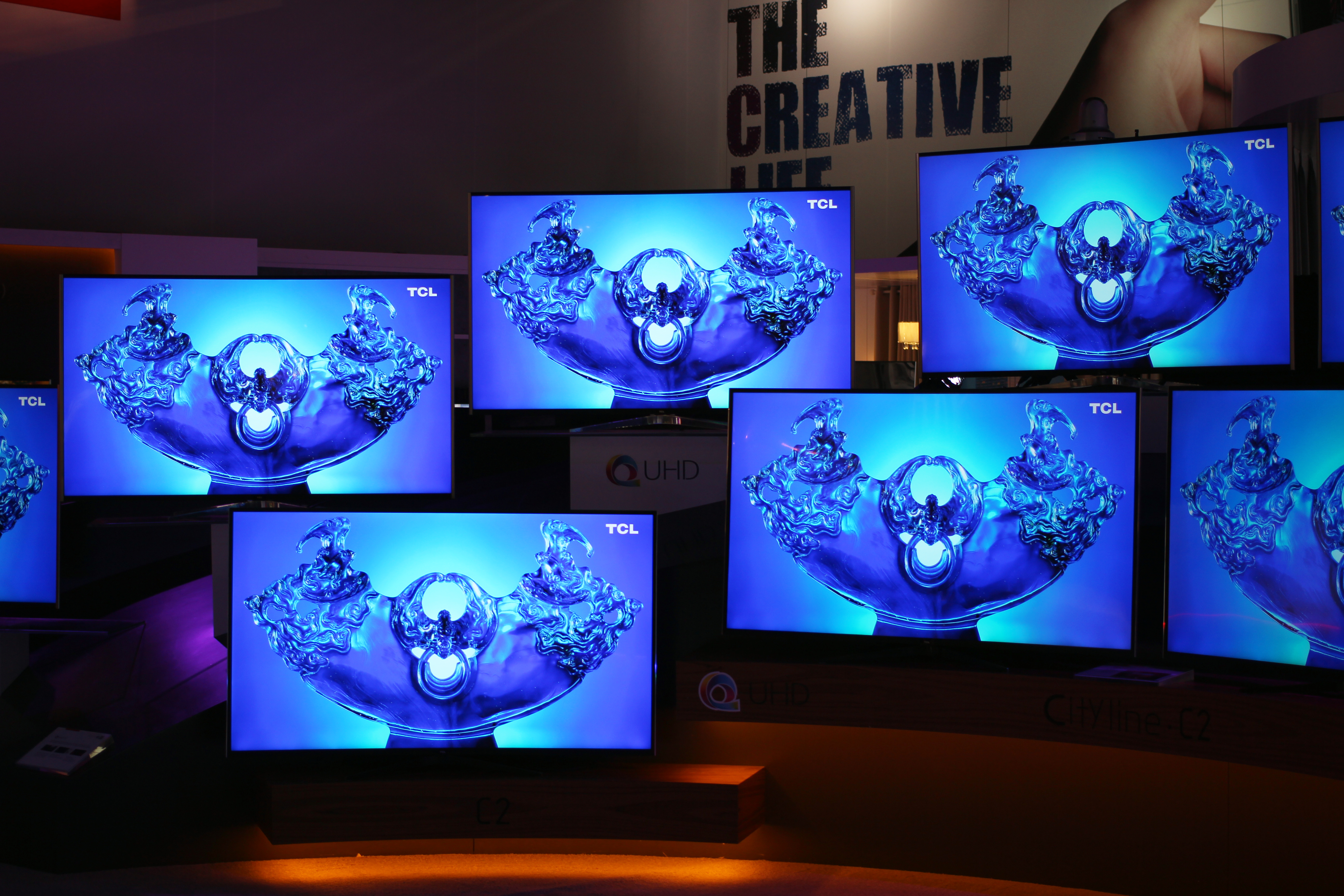
A TCL television set

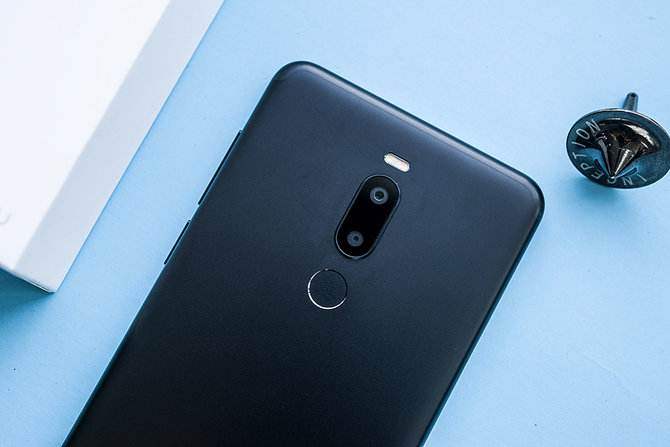
A Meizu smartphone

Countries which signed cooperation documents related to the Belt and Road Initiative

Outward foreign direct investment is a new feature of Chinese globalization, where local Chinese firms seek to make investments in both developing and developed countries. It was reported in 2011 that there was increasing investment by capital rich Chinese firms in promising firms in the United States. Such investments offer access to expertise in marketing and distribution potentially useful in exploiting the developing Chinese domestic market.

Since 2005, Chinese companies have been actively expanding outside of China, in both developed and developing countries. In 2013, Chinese companies invested US$90 billion globally in non-financial sectors, 16% more than 2012.

China is willing to invest in riskier countries.

During the administration of Xi Jinping, outbound foreign investment and infrastructure projects have often been construed as part of the Belt and Road Initiative. Between 2013 and 2021, the Middle East was a prominent recipient of China's outbound FDI, particularly because of the importance of its energy supplies for China.

There are two ways Chinese companies choose to enter a foreign market: organic growth and Merge & Acquisition (M&A). Many Chinese companies would prefer M&A for the following reasons:

- Fast. M&A is the fastest way for a company to expand into another country by acquiring brand, distribution, talents, and technology. Chinese CEOs has been used to growing at 50%+ speed and do not want to spend capital.
- China market. China has become the world's largest economy. Many Chinese acquire foreign companies and then bring their products/services to China, anything from premium cars to fashion clothing to meat to Hollywood movies.
- Cheap capital access. The huge Chinese domestic market help many Chinese companies accumulated financial capital to do M&A. Chinese government also provides long-term, low-interest capital for companies to expand abroad.
- Low risk. M&A helped Chinese companies avoid risk of failure of organic growth as they got an established company with everything in place.
- Cheap labor. Some companies may move part of the manufacturing in high labor cost countries to China to reduce the cost and make the product more attractive in price.
- Trade and policy barrier. Chinese companies in many sectors face quota limitation and high tax, which prevent them from being competitive in foreign markets.
- Depressed assets. 2008–2010 global economic crisis created liquidity problems for a lot of western companies and reduced their market value. Chinese companies believe it is a great opportunity for them to buy these depressed assets at discount. China's direct foreign investment in non-financial sector growth from US$25 billion in 2007 to US$90 billion in 2013, more than three times.
- China is growing in investments and influencing power over Europe, and the EU has begun to take notice.

At the beginning, state-owned enterprises dominate the foreign acquisition and most of the money goes to oil and minerals. Since 2005, more and more private companies start to acquire non-raw material foreign companies. As of 2018, the top 15 outbound deals from Chinese companies:

Date	Acquirer	Acquirer industry	Target	Target industry	Target country	Deal value in millions of USD
3 February 2016	CNAC Saturn (NL) BV	Chemicals	Syngenta AG	Chemicals	Switzerland	41,840.11
23 July 2012	CNOOC Canada Holding Ltd	Other financials	Nexen Inc	Oil and gas	Canada	19,119.31
1 February 2008	Shining Prospect Pte Ltd	Other financials	Rio Tinto PLC	Metals and mining	United Kingdom	14,284.17
2 June 2017	China Investment Corp	Alternative financial investments	Logicor Ltd	Non residential	United Kingdom	13,742.43
14 July 2017	Nesta Investment Holdings Ltd	Other financials	Global Logistic Properties Ltd	Non residential	Singapore	11,553.58
22 August 2017	China Unicom (BVI) Ltd	Telecommunications services	China Unicom Hong Kong Ltd	Telecommunications services	Hong Kong	11,255.81
6 October 2016	Park Aerospace Holdings Ltd	Transportation and infrastructure	C2 Aviation Capital LLC	Transportation and infrastructure	United States	10,380.00
14 October 2015	China Tower Corp Ltd	Telecommunications services	China-Telecommun tower asts	Wireless	China	9,948.41
21 June 2016	Halti SA	Other financials	Supercell Oy	Software	Finland	8,600.00
24 June 2009	Mirror Lake Oil & Gas Co Ltd	Oil and gas	Addax Petroleum Corp	Oil and gas	Switzerland	7,157.40
1 October 2010	China Petrochemical Corporation	Oil and gas	Repsol YPF Brasil SA	Oil and gas	Brazil	7,111.00
16 March 2016	Anbang Insurance Group Co Ltd	Insurance	Strategic Hotels & Resorts Inc	REITs	United States	6,500.00
24 October 2016	Hna Tourism Grp Co Ltd	Travel services	Hilton Worldwide Holdings Inc	Hotels and lodging	United States	6,496.88
17 February 2016	Tianjin Tianhai Investment Co Ltd	Transportation and infrastructure	Ingram Micro Inc.	Computers and peripherals	United States	6,067.41
22 March 2015	Marco Polo Industrial Hldg SpA	Other financials	Pirelli & C SpA	Automobiles and components	Italy	

However, the fast growth and M&A deals did not change consumers' low quality and low-price perception of Chinese goods and brands. According to market consecutive research by the Monogram Group, a Chicago-based advertising agency, in 2007, 2009, 2011 and 2012, American consumers' willingness to purchase Chinese products across all categories except PC remained the same or became worse during 2007–2012. The only sector in which Americans were more likely to purchase was personal computers.

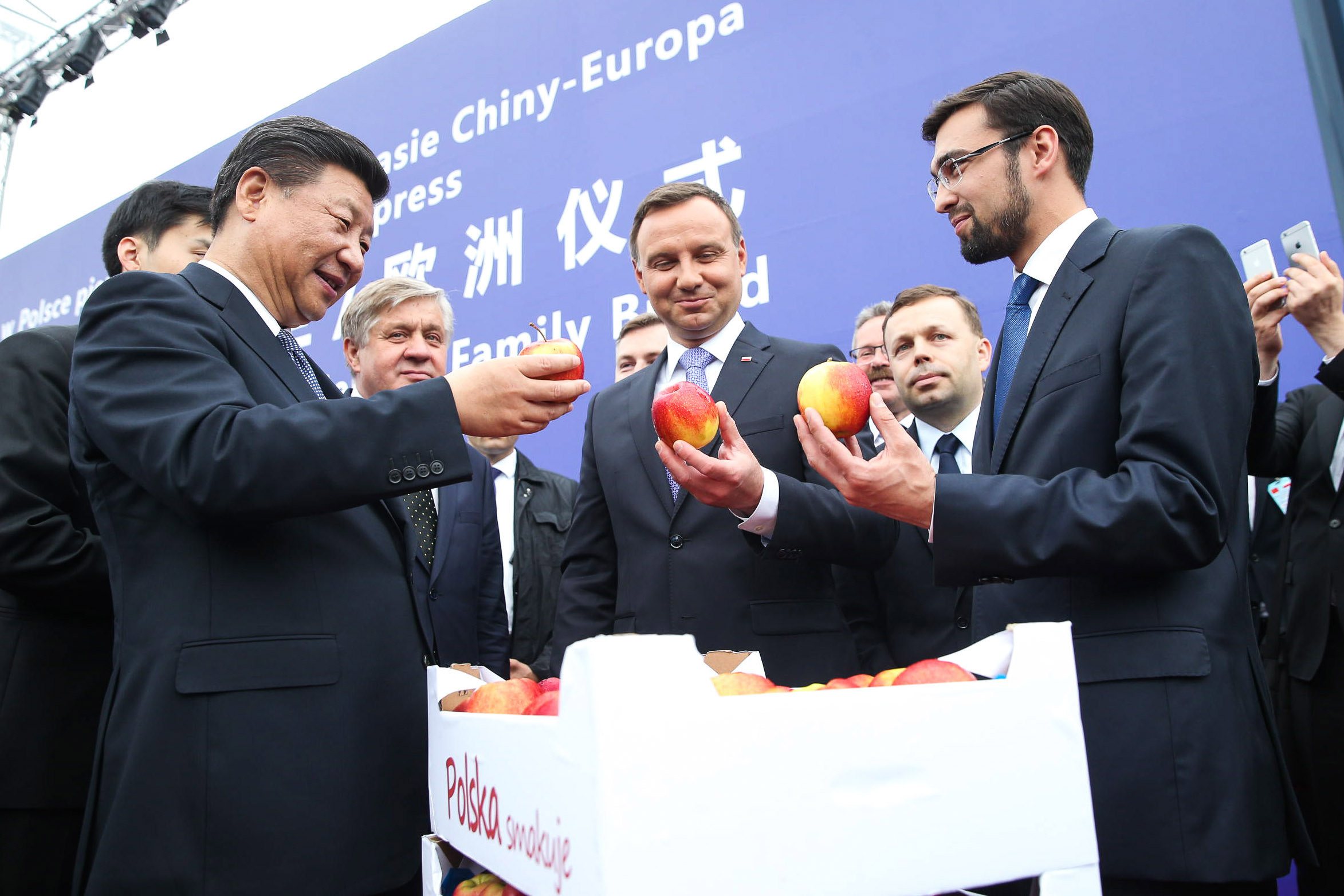
China's leader Xi Jinping and Poland's President Andrzej Duda during the inauguration of the China Railway Express in Warsaw, Poland, 20 June 2016

=== Mergers and acquisitions ===
From 1993 to 2010, Chinese companies have been involved as either an acquiror or acquired company in 25,284 mergers and acquisitions with a total known value of US$969 billion.

== Labor force ==
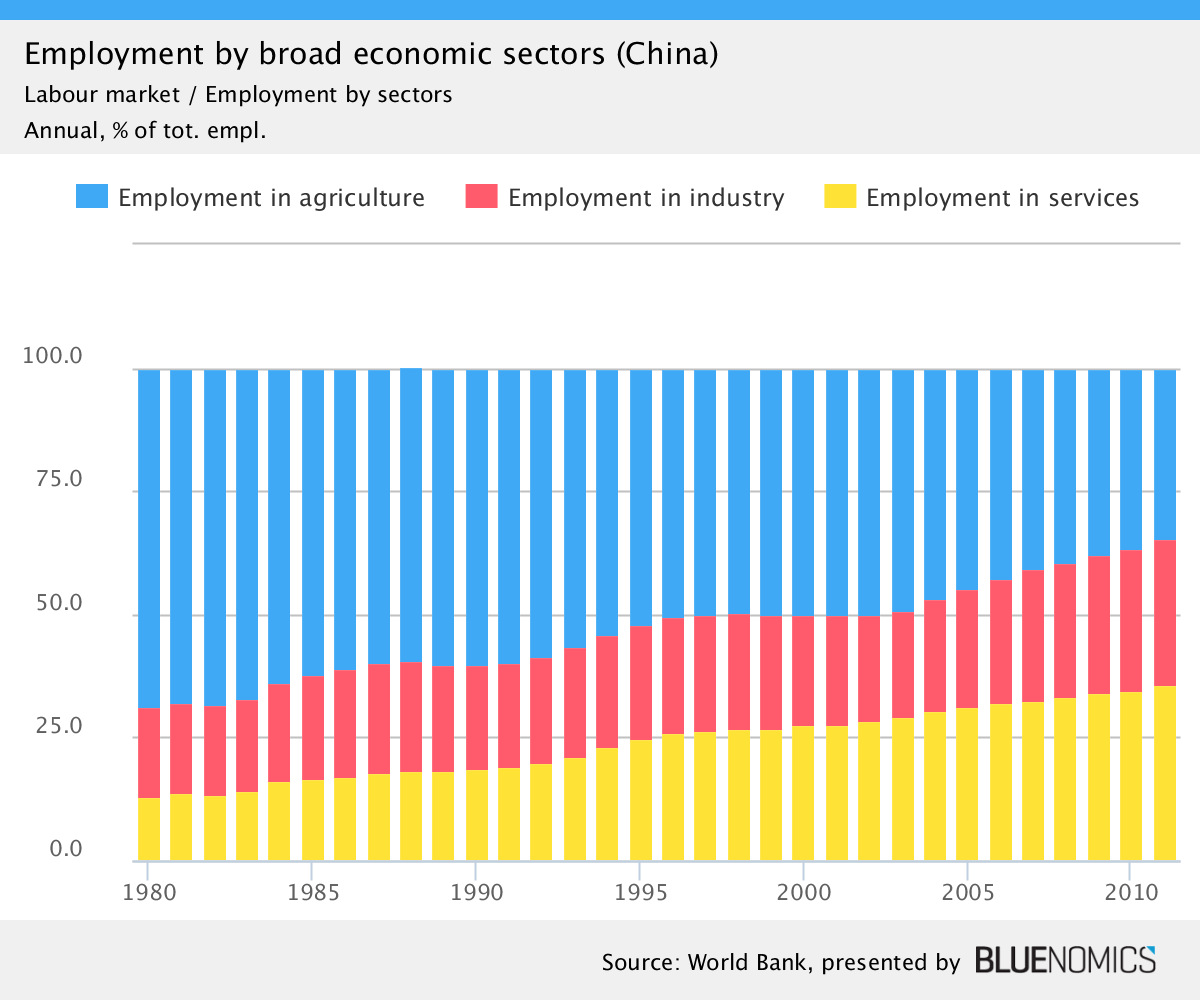
This chart shows the Chinese employment by sectors during time.

With 773 million workers, China's labor force is the world's largest as of 2024.

In January 2016, a two-child policy replaced the one-child policy, which was in turn was replaced with a three-child policy in May 2021. In July 2021, all family size limits as well as penalties for exceeding them were removed.

The All-China Federation of Trade Unions is the country's only legally permissible trade union. Attempts to form trade unions independent of the ACFTU have been rare and short-lived. One notable example is the Beijing Workers' Autonomous Federation formed during the 1989 Tiananmen Square protests and massacre. Martial Law Command Headquarters issued a public notice declaring the BWAF an illegal organization and ordering it to disband on the grounds that Federation leaders were among "the main instigators and organizers in the capital of the counterrevolutionary rebellion. E-commerce platforms are a reasonable source of employment in China. A 2019 World Bank report on China's e-commerce development describes employment in online shops, website designs, product photography, logistics, and suppliers of materials and intermediate goods while noting limitations in measuring the causal effect of e-commerce on employment. Other studies including a 2109 Alibaba Research Institute study estimated that Alibaba's retail platform is associated with 40.82 million jobs in China in 2018, including 15.58 million transaction-related jobs and 25.24 million indirect jobs.The study included employment connected with online retailing and related upstream and downstream activities. Studies, including AliResearch which is an in-house Alibaba Group think tank, and affiliated academic studies, project China's digital economy to support hundreds of millions of jobs by the 2030s. One widely cited estimate suggests that the digital economy may create more than 400 million job opportunities in China by around 2035. Other online retail companies like JD.com and Pinduoduo contribute significantly to employment while there has been a significant shift to merchant entrepreneurship, platform services, livestreaming, logistics, warehousing, delivery, and flexible work.

As of 2024, China has one of the lowest retirement ages among major world economies, with many working women eligible for retirement at 50 and men at 60.

== Transportation and infrastructure ==
=== Transportation ===
Chinese transportation network

National Trunk Highway System network

National railway network

China has the world's longest and most extensively used high-speed rail network in the world — the network extends over 45,000 kilometers.

China's transportation policy, influenced by political, military, and economic concerns, has undergone major changes since 1949. Immediately after the People's Republic was founded, the primary goal was to repair existing transportation infrastructure in order to meet military transport and logistics needs as well as to strengthen territorial integrity. During most of the 1950s, new road and rail links were built, while at the same time old ones were improved. During the 1960s much of the improvement of regional transportation became the responsibility of the local governments, and many small railways were constructed. Emphasis was also placed on developing transportation in remote rural, mountainous, and forested areas, in order to integrate poorer regions of the country and to help promote economies of scale in the agricultural sector.

Before the reform era began in the late 1970s, China's transportation links were mostly concentrated in the coastal areas and access to the inner regions was generally poor. This situation has been improved considerably since then, as railways and highways have been built in the remote and frontier regions of the northwest and southwest. At the same time, the development of international transportation was also pursued, and the scope of ocean shipping was broadened considerably.

Freight haulage is mainly provided by rail transport. The rail sector is monopolized by China Railway and there is wide variation in services provided. In late 2007 China became one of the few countries in the world to launch its own indigenously developed high-speed train. As rail capacity is struggling to meet demand for the transport of goods and raw materials such as coal, air routes, roads and waterways are rapidly being developed to provide an increasing proportion of China's overall transportation needs.

Some economic experts have argued that the development gap between China and other emerging economies such as Brazil, Argentina and India can be attributed to a large extent to China's early focus on ambitious infrastructure projects: while China invested roughly 9% of its GDP on infrastructure in the 1990s and 2000s, most emerging economies invested only 2% to 5% of their GDP. This considerable spending gap allowed the Chinese economy to grow at near optimal conditions while many South American economies suffered from various development bottlenecks such as poor transportation networks, aging power grids and mediocre schools.

=== Water supply and sanitation ===
Water supply and sanitation in China is undergoing a massive transition while facing numerous challenges, such as rapid urbanization, increasing economic inequality, and the supply of water to rural areas. Water scarcity and pollution also impact access to water.

Progress has been made in the past decades, with increased access to services, increased municipal wastewater treatment, the creation of water and wastewater utilities that are legally and financially separated from local governments, and increasing cost recovery as part of the transformation of the Chinese economy to a more market-oriented system. The government quadrupled investments in the sector during the Eleventh Five-Year Plan (2006–10).

Nevertheless, much remains to be achieved. According to survey data analyzed by the Joint Monitoring Program for Water and Sanitation of the World Health Organization and UNICEF, about 100 million Chinese still did not have access to an improved water source in 2008, and about 460 million did not have access to improved sanitation. Progress in rural areas appears to lag behind what has been achieved in urban areas. According to data presented by the Joint Monitoring Program for Water Supply and Sanitation of WHO and UNICEF in 2015, about 36% of the rural population in China still did not have access to improved sanitation.

The situation has been improved greatly. In 2024, proportion of population with basic hygiene services was 97%

== Science and technology ==
According to WIPO, China is the largest source of patent filings globally. China accounts for more than half of global patent contributions.

Science and technology in China has in recent decades developed rapidly. The Chinese government has placed emphasis through funding, reform, and societal status on science and technology as a fundamental part of the socio-economic development of the country as well as for national prestige. China has made rapid advances in areas such as education, infrastructure, high-tech manufacturing, artificial intelligence, academic publishing, patents and commercial applications. China is now increasingly targeting indigenous innovation and aims to reform remaining weaknesses. Its Thousand Talents Plan aims to attract innovative Chinese academics living abroad (as well as some foreigners) back to China in support of its economic innovation goals.

A 2023 Australian Strategic Policy Institute study of what it deemed as 44 critical technologies concluded that China leads the world in 37 of them, including 5G internet, electric batteries, and hypersonic missiles.

== See also ==
- Bamboo network
- Beijing Consensus
- Central Financial Work Commission
- China and the World Bank
- China and the International Monetary Fund
- China Securities Regulatory Commission
- China Beijing Equity Exchange
- China Circle
- China Economic Databases
- Dual circulation
- Economy of Asia
- Economy of East Asia
- Economy of the Han dynasty
- Economy of the Ming dynasty
- Economy of the Song dynasty
- Economy of the Qing dynasty
- Foreign aid to China
- Grasping the large, letting go of the small
- Group buying
- Guo jin min tui
- Guo tui min jin
- Hukou
- Imperial Bank of China
- Intellectual property in China
- Leading stocks
- List of Chinese by net worth
- List of companies of China
- Rural credit cooperative
- Rural society in China
- Silk Road
- Township and Village Enterprises
- Three Rural Issues
- Yangtze Delta
