= List of prefectures in China =

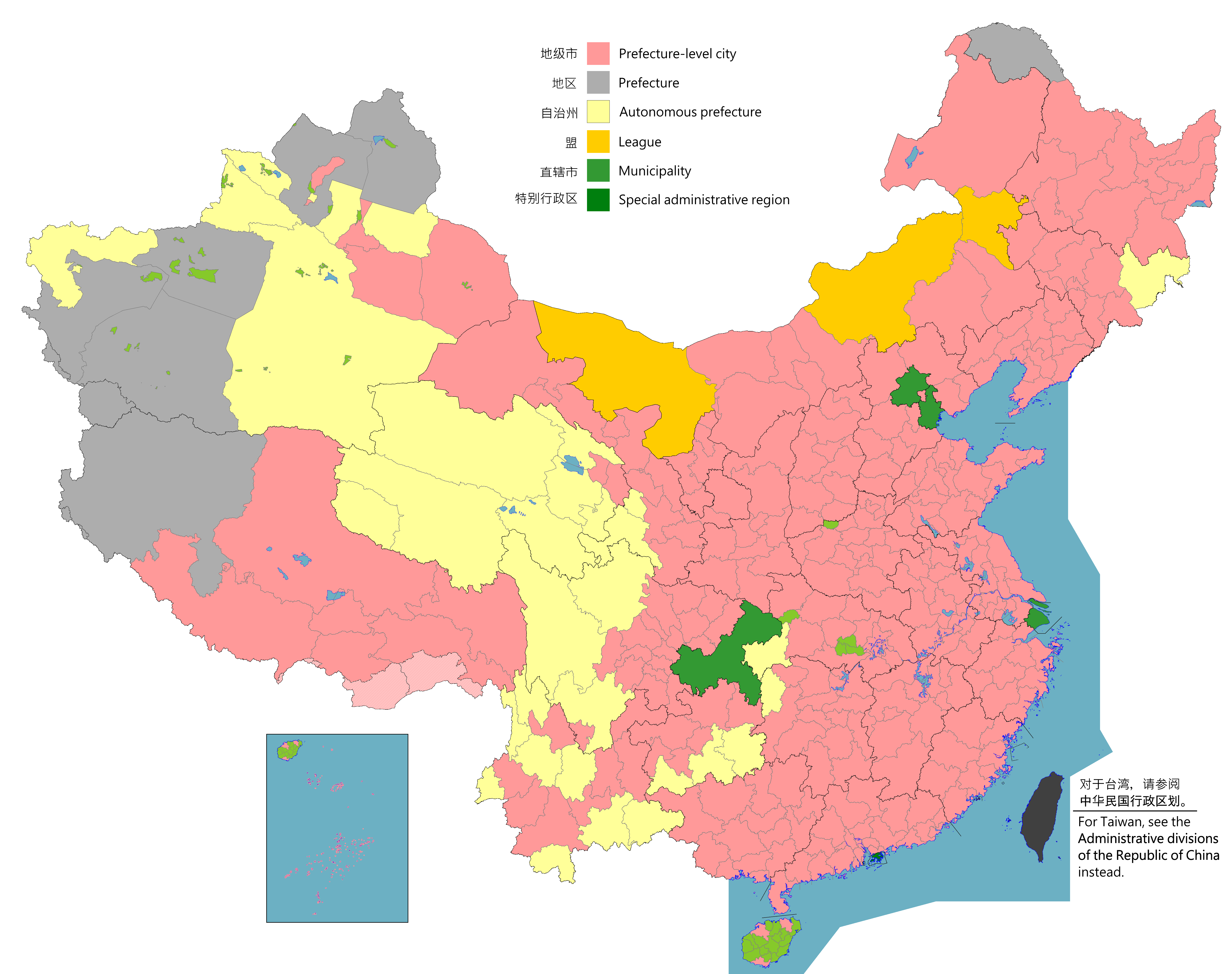
A map of prefecture-level divisions of China (including sub-prefecture level divisions)

All provincial-level divisions of China are divided into prefectural-level divisions (second-level): prefectural-level cities, prefectures, autonomous prefectures and leagues. There are 339 official prefecture level divisions in China as of January 2019: 333 under the control of the People's Republic of China, and 6 in the claimed Taiwan Province. (Note: As Taiwan is currently administered by the Republic of China, its administrative divisions differ from those in provinces administered by the People's Republic of China. PRC once treated the claimed official borders and divisions of the Taiwan Province of People's Republic of China as a mirror of those of the ROC Taiwan Province before 1949, and displayed them on maps as such. However, as of 2018, PRC official map service Tianditu treats all six special municipalities as prefecture-level cities, all three provincial cities as county-level cities directly administered by the province, and all fourteen county-administered cities as subdistricts under each individual county's jurisdiction.)

== Number of prefectures in each province ==
Note

- () not shown in the list below
- [] special divisions

Province	City	Pref.	A. Pref.	League
Anhui	16			
Beijing	none			
Chongqing	none			
Fujian	9			
Gansu	12		2	
Guangdong	21			
Guangxi	14			
Guizhou	6		3	
Hainan	4			
Hebei	11			
Heilongjiang	12	1		
Henan	17			
Hong Kong	none (Note: Currently China has 2 provincial-level special administrative regions: Hong Kong and Macau. Although both of them are not divided into prefectural-level divisions within PRC laws both regions does have a third-level division system (Districts of Hong Kong and Parishes of Macau). Parishes in Macau are purely symbolic entries, it no longer has any legal status.)			
Hubei	12		1	
Hunan	13		1	
Inner Mongolia	9			3
Jiangsu	13			
Jiangxi	11			
Jilin	8		1	
Liaoning	14			
Macau	none			
Ningxia	5			
Qinghai	2		6	
Shaanxi	10			
Shandong	16			
Shanghai	none			
Shanxi	11			
Sichuan	18		3	
Taiwan	(6)			
Tianjin	none			
Tibet	6	1		
Xinjiang	4	5 (Note: Ili (itself a prefecture with sub-provincial status) contains 2 other prefectures: Tacheng and Altay. Ili also directly controls 2 county-level cities, 7 counties, and 1 autonomous county, like a normal prefecture does. Tacheng and Altay is counted in Xinjiang's total number of prefectures here.)	5	
Yunnan	8		8	
Zhejiang	11			

== List ==
Note

- Municipalities (Beijing, Chongqing, (Note: A combination of 4 former prefectures:Chongqing, Fuling, Wanxian (now Wanzhou) and Qianjiang, all of them belonged to Sichuan Province.) Shanghai, & Tianjin) are not included but their internal divisions are similar as those of prefectures.
- Sub-prefecture-level cities are excluded.
- Sub-provincial cities are included, but other types of sub-provincial divisions are not.
- The six prefectures of Taiwan Province are not listed.
- * Indicates capital of province.
- Bold Sub-provincial city or above.

Name	Province	Type	Population (2010)	Area (km^{2})	GDP (billion CN¥) 2015	Prefecture Seat
Hefei*	Anhui	City	7,457,027	11,323	566.027	Shushan District
Anqing	Anhui	City	5,311,000	15,398	265.688	Daguan District
Bengbu	Anhui	City	3,164,000	5,952	198.897	Bengshan District
Bozhou	Anhui	City	4,851,000	8,394	197.268	Qiaocheng District
Chizhou	Anhui	City	1,403,000	9,423	100.418	Guichi District
Chuzhou	Anhui	City	3,938,000	13,398	336.211	Langya District
Fuyang	Anhui	City	7,600,000	13,300	307.153	Yingzhou District
Huaibei	Anhui	City	2,114,000	2,725	122.302	Xiangshan District
Huainan	Anhui	City	3,342,000	5,533	145.705	Tianjia'an District
Huangshan	Anhui	City	1,359,000	9,807	95.737	Tunxi District
Lu'an	Anhui	City	4,610,000	15,447	192.347	Jin'an District
Ma'anshan	Anhui	City	1,366,000	1,686	243.933	Yushan District
Suzhou, Anhui	Anhui	City	5,353,000	9,939	216.767	Yongqiao District
Tongling	Anhui	City	724,000	1,113	116.558	Tongguanshan District
Wuhu	Anhui	City	2,263,000	3,317	430.263	Jiujiang District
Xuancheng	Anhui	City	2,533,000	12,340	183.392	Xuanzhou District
Fuzhou, Fujian*	Fujian	City	7,115,370	12,000	561.810	Gulou District
Xiamen	Fujian	City	3,531,347	1,573	346.601	Siming District
Longyan	Fujian	City	2,559,545	19,069	173.845	Xinluo District
Nanping	Fujian	City	2,645,549	26,300	133.951	Yanping District
Ningde	Fujian	City	2,821,996	13,452	148.765	Jiaocheng District
Putian	Fujian	City	2,778,508	4,200	165.516	Chengxiang District
Quanzhou	Fujian	City	8,128,530	11,015	613.774	Fengze District
Sanming	Fujian	City	2,503,388	22,929	171.305	Meilie District
Zhangzhou	Fujian	City	4,809,983	12,607	276.745	Xiangcheng District
Jiuquan	Gansu	City	1,095,947	191,342	54.480	Suzhou District
Jiayuguan	Gansu	City	231,853	1,133	19.004	Xiongguan District
Zhangye	Gansu	City	1,199,515	16,216	37.353	Ganzhou District
Jinchang	Gansu	City	464,050	8,896	22.452	Jinchuan District
Wuwei	Gansu	City	1,815,054	33,000	41.619	Liangzhou District
Baiyin	Gansu	City	1,708,751	8,185	43.427	Baiyin District
Lanzhou*	Gansu	City	3,616,163	13,100	209.599	Chengguan District
Gannan	Gansu	Autonomous prefecture (Tibetan)	689,132	40,898	12.654	Hezuo City
Dingxi	Gansu	City	2,698,622	7,837	30.492	Anding District
Linxia	Gansu	Autonomous prefecture (Hui)	1,946,677	8,169	21.141	Linxia City
Longnan	Gansu	City	2,567,718	27,000	31.514	Wudu District
Tianshui	Gansu	City	3,262,548	14,300	55.377	Qinzhou District
Pingliang	Gansu	City	2,068,033	11,325	34.770	Kongtong District
Qingyang	Gansu	City	2,211,191	10,470	60.943	Xifeng District
Qingyuan	Guangdong	City	3,698,394	19,000	127.786	Qingcheng District
Shaoguan	Guangdong	City	2,826,612	18,645	114.998	Zhenjiang District
Heyuan	Guangdong	City	2,953,019	15,478	81.008	Yuancheng District
Meizhou	Guangdong	City	4,240,139	15,836	95.978	Meijiang District
Chaozhou	Guangdong	City	2,669,844	3,614	91.011	Xiangqiao District
Zhaoqing	Guangdong	City	3,918,085	22,322	197.001	Duanzhou District
Yunfu	Guangdong	City	2,360,128	7,813	71.314	Yuncheng District
Foshan	Guangdong	City	7,194,311	3,813	800.392	Chancheng District
Guangzhou*	Guangdong	City	12,700,800	7,434	1,810.041	Yuexiu District
Dongguan	Guangdong	City	8,220,237	2,465	627.507	Nancheng District
Huizhou	Guangdong	City	4,597,002	11,158	314.003	Huicheng District
Shanwei	Guangdong	City	2,935,717	5,271	76.206	Cheng District
Jieyang	Guangdong	City	5,877,025	5,240	189.901	Rongcheng District
Shantou	Guangdong	City	5,391,028	2,064	186.803	Jinping District
Zhanjiang	Guangdong	City	6,993,304	12,490	238.002	Chikan District
Maoming	Guangdong	City	5,817,753	11,458	244.563	Maonan District
Yangjiang	Guangdong	City	2,421,812	7,813	125.001	Jiangcheng District
Jiangmen	Guangdong	City	4,448,871	9,443	224.002	Pengjiang District
Zhongshan	Guangdong	City	3,120,884	1,800	301.003	Dong District
Zhuhai	Guangdong	City	1,560,229	1,653	202.541	Xiangzhou District
Shenzhen	Guangdong	City	10,357,938	2,050	1,750.286	Futian District
Baise	Guangxi	City	3,466,800	36,252	98.035	Youjiang District
Hechi	Guangxi	City	3,369,200	13,706	61.803	Jinchengjiang District
Liuzhou	Guangxi	City	3,758,700	16,877	229.862	Liubei District
Guilin	Guangxi	City	4,748,000	27,809	194.297	Lingui District
Hezhou	Guangxi	City	1,954,100	11,854	46.811	Babu District
Chongzuo	Guangxi	City	1,994,300	17,345	68.282	Jiangzhou District
Nanning*	Guangxi	City	6,661,600	22,293	341.009	Qingxiu District
Laibin	Guangxi	City	2,099,700	13,400	55.770	Xingbin District
Guigang	Guangxi	City	4,118,800	10,595	86.520	Gangbei District
Wuzhou	Guangxi	City	2,882,200	12,588	107.859	Changzhou District
Fangchenggang	Guangxi	City	866,900	2,386	62.072	Gangkou District
Qinzhou	Guangxi	City	3,079,700	5,250	94.442	Qinbei District
Beihai	Guangxi	City	1,539,300	1,288	89.208	Haicheng District
Yulin, Guangxi	Guangxi	City	5,487,400	12,839	144.613	Yuzhou District
Bijie	Guizhou	City	6,536,370	26,853	146.135	Qixingguan District
Zunyi	Guizhou	City	6,127,009	11,877	216.834	Huichuan District
Tongren	Guizhou	City	3,092,365	18,006	77.089	Bijiang District
Liupanshui	Guizhou	City	2,851,180	9,926	120.108	Zhongshan District
Anshun	Guizhou	City	2,297,339	9,269	62.541	Xixiu District
Guiyang*	Guizhou	City	4,324,561	8,034	289.116	Guanshanhu District
Qianxinan	Guizhou	Autonomous prefecture (Buyei & Miao)	2,805,857	16,804	80.165	Xingyi City
Qiannan	Guizhou	Autonomous prefecture (Buyei & Miao)	3,231,161	26,207	90.291	Duyun City
Qiandongnan	Guizhou	Autonomous prefecture (Miao & Dong)	3,480,626	30,339	81.155	Kaili City
Danzhou	Hainan	City	932,362	3,400	44.325	Nada Town
Haikou*	Hainan	City	2,046,189	2,304	116.196	Longhua District
Sanya	Hainan	City	685,408	1,919	43.582	Jiyang District
Sansha	Hainan	City	444	13	–	Xisha District (Xisha Islands)
Shijiazhuang*	Hebei	City	9,547,869	14,771	98.035	Chang'an District
Baoding	Hebei	City	10,029,197	20,911	330.056	Xinshi District
Cangzhou	Hebei	City	7,134,053	14,383	332.063	Yunhe District
Chengde	Hebei	City	3,473,197	39,519	135.873	Shuangqiao District
Handan	Hebei	City	9,174,679	12,068	314.543	Congtai District
Hengshui	Hebei	City	4,340,773	8,815	122.001	Taocheng District
Langfang	Hebei	City	4,358,839	6,417	247.386	Guangyang District
Qinhuangdao	Hebei	City	2,987,605	7,812	125.044	Haigang District
Tangshan	Hebei	City	7,577,284	17,040	610.306	Lubei District
Xingtai	Hebei	City	7,104,114	12,486	176.473	Qiaodong District
Zhangjiakou	Hebei	City	4,345,491	36,947	136.354	Qiaoxi District
Harbin*	Heilongjiang	City	10,635,971	53,068	575.120	Songbei District
Daqing	Heilongjiang	City	2,904,532	8,556	298.350	Sartu District
Hegang	Heilongjiang	City	1,058,665	14,784	26.560	Xiangyang District
Heihe	Heilongjiang	City	1,673,898	54,390	44.770	Aihui District
Jiamusi	Heilongjiang	City	2,552,097	12,173	86.070	Jiao District
Jixi	Heilongjiang	City	1,862,161	22,351	51.470	Jiguan District
Mudanjiang	Heilongjiang	City	2,798,723	40,435	131.070	Dong'an District
Qiqihar	Heilongjiang	City	5,367,003	42,469	127.030	Jianhua District
Qitaihe	Heilongjiang	City	920,419	6,221	21.270	Taoshan District
Shuangyashan	Heilongjiang	City	1,462,626	10,225	43.330	Jianshan District
Suihua	Heilongjiang	City	5,416,439	13,595	127.220	Beilin District
Yichun, Heilongjiang	Heilongjiang	City	1,148,126	15,064	24.820	Yichun District
Daxing'anling	Heilongjiang	Prefecture	511,564	46,755	13.510	Jiagedaqi District
Zhengzhou*	Henan	City	8,626,505	7,446	731.152	Zhongyuan District
Anyang	Henan	City	5,172,834	7,355	187.235	Wenfeng District
Hebi	Henan	City	1,569,100	2,182	71.565	Qibin District
Jiaozuo	Henan	City	3,539,860	4,071	192.608	Jiefang District
Kaifeng	Henan	City	4,676,159	6,444	160.584	Gulou District
Luohe	Henan	City	2,544,103	2,617	99.259	Yancheng District
Luoyang	Henan	City	6,549,486	15,208	346.903	Luolong District
Nanyang	Henan	City	10,263,006	26,600	286.682	Wolong District
Pingdingshan	Henan	City	4,904,367	7,882	168.601	Xinhua District
Puyang	Henan	City	3,598,494	4,188	132.834	Hualong District
Sanmenxia	Henan	City	2,233,872	10,496	125.104	Hubin District
Shangqiu	Henan	City	7,362,472	10,704	181.216	Liangyuan District
Xinxiang	Henan	City	5,707,801	8,169	197.503	Weibin District
Xinyang	Henan	City	6,108,683	18,819	187.967	Shihe District
Xuchang	Henan	City	4,307,199	4,996	217.116	Weidu District
Zhoukou	Henan	City	8,953,172	11,959	208.970	Chuanhui District
Zhumadian	Henan	City	7,230,744	15,083	180.769	Yicheng District
Wuhan*	Hubei	City	9,785,392	8,494	1,090.560	Jiang'an District
Ezhou	Hubei	City	1,048,672	1,504	73.001	Echeng District
Huanggang	Hubei	City	6,162,072	17,446	158.924	Huangzhou District
Huangshi	Hubei	City	2,429,318	4,630	122.811	Xialu District
Jingmen	Hubei	City	2,873,687	12,404	138.846	Dongbao District
Jingzhou	Hubei	City	5,691,707	14,067	159.050	Shashi District
Shiyan	Hubei	City	3,340,843	23,600	130.012	Maojian District
Suizhou	Hubei	City	2,162,222	9,636	78.526	Zengdu District
Xiangyang	Hubei	City	5,500,307	19,700	338.212	Xiangcheng District
Xianning	Hubei	City	2,462,583	9,861	103.007	Xian'an District
Xiaogan	Hubei	City	4,814,542	8,910	145.720	Xiaonan District
Yichang	Hubei	City	4,059,686	21,227	338.480	Xiling District
Enshi	Hubei	Autonomous prefecture (Tujia & Miao)	3,290,294	9,266	67.081	Enshi City
Changsha*	Hunan	City	7,044,118	11,820	851.013	Yuelu District
Changde	Hunan	City	5,747,218	18,189	270.902	Wuling District
Chenzhou	Hunan	City	4,581,778	19,317	201.207	Beihu District
Hengyang	Hunan	City	7,141,462	15,310	260.157	Zhengxiang District
Huaihua	Hunan	City	4,741,948	27,600	127.325	Hecheng District
Loudi	Hunan	City	3,785,627	8,107	129.138	Louxing District
Shaoyang	Hunan	City	7,071,826	20,829	138.700	Daxiang District
Xiangtan	Hunan	City	2,748,552	5,015	170.310	Yuetang District
Yiyang	Hunan	City	4,313,084	12,144	135.441	Heshan District
Yongzhou	Hunan	City	5,180,235	22,255	141.818	Lengshuitan District
Yueyang	Hunan	City	5,477,911	5,799	288.628	Yueyanglou District
Zhangjiajie	Hunan	City	1,476,521	9,516	44.770	Yongding District
Zhuzhou	Hunan	City	3,855,609	11,262	233.511	Tianyuan District
Xiangxi	Hunan	Autonomous Prefecture (Tujia & Miao)	2,547,833	15,486	49.719	Jishou City
Alxa	Inner Mongolia	League	231,334	267,574	32.258	Bayanhot Elute Subdistrict, Alxa Left Banner
Bayannur	Inner Mongolia	City	1,669,915	65,788	88.743	Linhe District
Wuhai	Inner Mongolia	City	532,902	1,754	55.983	Haibowan District
Ordos	Inner Mongolia	City	1,940,653	87,000	422.613	Dongsheng District
Baotou	Inner Mongolia	City	2,650,364	27,768	372.193	Hondlon District
Hohhot*	Inner Mongolia	City	2,866,615	17,224	309.052	Xincheng District
Ulanqab	Inner Mongolia	City	2,143,590	54,491	91.377	Jining District
Xilingol	Inner Mongolia	League	1,028,022	202,580	100.010	Xilinhot City
Chifeng	Inner Mongolia	City	4,341,245	90,275	186.127	Hongshan District
Tongliao	Inner Mongolia	City	3,139,153	59,535	187.744	Horqin District
Hinggan	Inner Mongolia	League	1,613,250	59,806	50.231	Ulanhot City
Hulunbuir	Inner Mongolia	City	2,549,278	263,953	159.601	Hailar District
Nanjing*	Jiangsu	City	8,004,680	6,598	972.077	Xuanwu District
Changzhou	Jiangsu	City	4,591,972	4,385	527.315	Xinbei District
Huai'an	Jiangsu	City	4,799,889	10,072	274.509	Qinghe District
Lianyungang	Jiangsu	City	4,393,914	7,444	216.064	Xinpu District
Nantong	Jiangsu	City	7,282,835	8,001	614.840	Chongchuan District
Suqian	Jiangsu	City	4,715,553	8,555	212.619	Sucheng District
Suzhou, Jiangsu	Jiangsu	City	10,465,994	8,488	1,450.407	Gusu District
Taizhou, Jiangsu	Jiangsu	City	4,618,558	5,790	368.790	Hailing District
Wuxi	Jiangsu	City	6,372,624	4,787	851.826	Binhu District
Xuzhou	Jiangsu	City	8,580,500	11,258	531.988	Yunlong District
Yancheng	Jiangsu	City	7,260,240	16,920	421.250	Tinghu District
Yangzhou	Jiangsu	City	4,459,760	6,658	401.684	Guangling District
Zhenjiang	Jiangsu	City	3,113,384	3,847	350.248	Runzhou District
Nanchang*	Jiangxi	City	5,042,565	7,402	400.001	Donghu District
Fuzhou, Jiangxi	Jiangxi	City	3,912,312	7,258	110.514	Linchuan District
Ganzhou	Jiangxi	City	8,368,440	39,400	197.387	Zhanggong District
Ji'an	Jiangxi	City	4,810,340	25,300	132.852	Jizhou District
Jingdezhen	Jiangxi	City	1,587,477	5,256	77.206	Changjiang District
Jiujiang	Jiangxi	City	4,728,763	18,823	190.268	Xunyang District
Pingxiang	Jiangxi	City	1,854,510	1,477	91.329	Anyuan District
Shangrao	Jiangxi	City	6,579,714	22,791	165.081	Xinzhou District
Xinyu	Jiangxi	City	1,138,873	1,227	94.680	Yushui District
Yichun, Jiangxi	Jiangxi	City	5,419,575	7,208	162.102	Yuanzhou District
Yingtan	Jiangxi	City	1,124,906	7,208	63.926	Yuehu District
Changchun*	Jilin	City	7,677,089	20,532	553.003	Chaoyang District
Baicheng	Jilin	City	2,033,058	25,683	69.968	Taobei District
Baishan	Jilin	City	1,295,750	17,485	66.855	Hunjiang District
Jilin	Jilin	City	4,414,681	27,700	239.419	Chuanying District
Liaoyuan	Jilin	City	1,176,645	5,125	72.664	Longshan District
Siping	Jilin	City	3,386,325	14,323	123.325	Tiexi District
Songyuan	Jilin	City	2,881,082	22,000	163.730	Ningjiang District
Tonghua	Jilin	City	2,325,242	15,195	100.121	Dongchang District
Yanbian	Jilin	Autonomous Prefecture (Korean)	2,271,600	43,509	85.884	Yanji City
Shenyang*	Liaoning	City	8,106,171	12,924	727.231	Shenhe District
Dalian	Liaoning	City	6,690,432	13,237	773.164	Xigang District
Anshan	Liaoning	City	3,645,884	9,252	233.700	Tiedong District
Benxi	Liaoning	City	1,709,538	8,411	116.469	Pingshan District
Chaoyang	Liaoning	City	3,044,641	19,698	85.473	Shuangta District
Dandong	Liaoning	City	2,444,697	14,981	98.490	Zhenxing District
Fushun	Liaoning	City	2,138,090	10,816	121.648	Shuncheng District
Fuxin	Liaoning	City	1,819,339	10,445	52.554	Xihe District
Huludao	Liaoning	City	2,623,541	10,415	72.017	Longgang District
Jinzhou	Liaoning	City	3,126,463	10,111	132.733	Taihe District
Liaoyang	Liaoning	City	1,858,768	4,731	102.858	Baita District
Panjin	Liaoning	City	1,392,493	4,071	125.654	Xinglongtai District
Tieling	Liaoning	City	2,717,732	13,000	74.090	Yinzhou District
Yingkou	Liaoning	City	2,428,534	5,402	151.375	Zhanqian District
Yinchuan*	Ningxia	City	1,993,088	4,467	149.386	Jinfeng District
Shizuishan	Ningxia	City	725,482	5,209	48.260	Dawukou District
Wuzhong	Ningxia	City	1,273,792	20,733	40.560	Litong District
Zhongwei	Ningxia	City	1,080,832	16,986	31.689	Shapotou District
Guyuan	Ningxia	City	1,228,156	14,412	21.732	Yuanzhou District
Haixi	Qinghai	Autonomous prefecture (Mongol & Tibetan)	489,338	325,785	43.985	Delingha
Haibei	Qinghai	Autonomous prefecture (Tibetan)	273,304	34,700	9.486	Sanjiaocheng Town, Haiyan County
Xining*	Qinghai	City	2,208,708	7,372	113.162	Chengzhong District
Haidong	Qinghai	City	1,396,846	12,810	38.440	Ledu District
Hainan	Qinghai	Autonomous prefecture (Tibetan)	441,689	46,000	14.020	Qabqa Town, Gonghe County
Huangnan	Qinghai	Autonomous prefecture (Tibetan)	256,716	17,921	7.275	Rongwo Town, Tongren County
Yushu	Qinghai	Autonomous prefecture (Tibetan)	378,439	188,794	6.055	Yushu City
Golog	Qinghai	Autonomous prefecture (Tibetan)	181,682	76,312	3.566	Dawu Town, Maqên County
Xi'an*	Shaanxi	City	8,467,837	9,983	580.120	Weiyang District
Ankang	Shaanxi	City	2,629,906	23,529	75.505	Hanbin District
Baoji	Shaanxi	City	3,716,731	18,712	178.763	Jintai District
Hanzhong	Shaanxi	City	3,416,196	27,246	105.961	Hantai District
Shangluo	Shaanxi	City	2,341,742	19,292	61.852	Shangzhou District
Tongchuan	Shaanxi	City	834,437	3,882	30.716	Yaozhou District
Weinan	Shaanxi	City	5,286,077	13,000	143.041	Linwei District
Xianyang	Shaanxi	City	4,894,834	10,196	215.292	Qindu District
Yan'an	Shaanxi	City	2,187,009	37,000	119.827	Baota District
Yulin, Shaanxi	Shaanxi	City	3,351,437	43,578	249.188	Yuyang District
Jinan*	Shandong	City	6,814,000	8,177	610.023	Lixia District
Qingdao	Shandong	City	8,715,100	10,654	930.007	Shinan District
Binzhou	Shandong	City	3,748,500	9,444	235.533	Bincheng District
Dezhou	Shandong	City	5,568,200	10,356	275.094	Decheng District
Dongying	Shandong	City	2,035,300	7,923	345.064	Dongying District
Heze	Shandong	City	8,287,800	12,238	240.096	Mudan District
Jining	Shandong	City	8,081,900	10,685	401.312	Shizhong District
Liaocheng	Shandong	City	5,789,900	8,715	266.362	Dongchangfu District
Linyi	Shandong	City	10,039,400	17,251	376.317	Lanshan District
Rizhao	Shandong	City	2,801,100	5,310	167.080	Donggang District
Tai'an	Shandong	City	5,494,200	7,762	315.839	Taishan District
Weifang	Shandong	City	9,086,200	15,800	517.053	Kuiwen District
Weihai	Shandong	City	2,804,800	5,436	300.157	Huancui District
Yantai	Shandong	City	6,968,200	13,739	644.608	Laishan District
Zaozhuang	Shandong	City	3,729,300	4,550	203.100	Shizhong District
Zibo	Shandong	City	4,530,600	5,938	413.024	Zhangdian District
Taiyuan*	Shanxi	City	4,201,591	6,956	273.534	Xinghualing District
Changzhi	Shanxi	City	3,334,564	13,864	119.534	Cheng District
Datong	Shanxi	City	3,318,057	14,176	105.337	Cheng District
Jincheng	Shanxi	City	2,279,151	9,484	104.024	Cheng District
Jinzhong	Shanxi	City	3,249,425	16,408	104.612	Yuci District
Linfen	Shanxi	City	4,316,612	20,275	116.111	Yaodu District
Lüliang	Shanxi	City	3,727,057	21,000	95.580	Lishi District
Shuozhou	Shanxi	City	1,714,857	5,737	90.113	Shuocheng District
Xinzhou	Shanxi	City	3,067,501	25,180	68.124	Xinfu District
Yangquan	Shanxi	City	1,368,502	4,452	59.570	Cheng District
Yuncheng	Shanxi	City	5,134,794	14,106	117.401	Yanhu District
Garzê	Sichuan	Autonomous prefecture (Tibetan)	1,091,872	151,078	21.304	Kangding City
Ngawa	Sichuan	Autonomous prefecture (Tibetan & Qiang)	898,713	83,201	26.504	Barkam Town, Barkam County
Mianyang	Sichuan	City	4,613,862	20,249	170.033	Fucheng District
Guangyuan	Sichuan	City	2,484,123	16,313	60.543	Lizhou District
Nanchong	Sichuan	City	6,278,622	12,479	151.620	Shunqing District
Bazhong	Sichuan	City	3,283,771	12,301	50.134	Bazhou District
Dazhou	Sichuan	City	5,468,092	16,591	135.076	Tongchuan District
Ya'an	Sichuan	City	1,507,264	15,300	50.258	Yucheng District
Chengdu*	Sichuan	City	14,047,625	12,390	1,080.116	Qingyang District
Deyang	Sichuan	City	3,615,759	5,818	160.506	Jingyang District
Suining	Sichuan	City	3,252,551	5,326	91.581	Chuanshan District
Guang'an	Sichuan	City	3,205,476	6,344	100.561	Guang'an District
Meishan	Sichuan	City	2,950,548	7,186	102.986	Dongpo District
Ziyang	Sichuan	City	3,665,064	7,962	127.038	Yanjiang District
Leshan	Sichuan	City	3,235,756	12,826	130.123	Shizhong District
Neijiang	Sichuan	City	3,702,847	5,386	119.858	Shizhong District
Zigong	Sichuan	City	2,678,898	4,372	114.311	Ziliujing District
Yibin	Sichuan	City	4,472,001	13,283	152.590	Cuiping District
Luzhou	Sichuan	City	4,218,426	12,247	135.341	Jiangyang District
Liangshan	Sichuan	Autonomous prefecture (Yi)	4,532,809	60,423	131.484	Xichang City
Panzhihua	Sichuan	City	1,214,121	7,440	92.518	Dong District
Ngari	Tibet	Prefecture	95,465	304,683	3.712	Sênggêzangbo Town, Gar County
Nagqu	Tibet	City	462,382	450,537	9.494	Nagqu Town, Nagqu County
Qamdo	Tibet	City	657,505	110,154	13.202	Karub District
Xigazê	Tibet	City	703,292	182,000	16.685	Samzhubzê District
Lhasa*	Tibet	City	559,423	31,662	37.673	Chingoin District
Lhoka	Tibet	City	328,990	79,699	11.362	Zêtang Town, Nêdong County
Nyingchi	Tibet	City	195,109	116,175	10.433	Bayi District
Altay	Xinjiang	Prefecture	603,280	117,988	22.212	Altay City
Bortala	Xinjiang	Autonomous prefecture (Mongol)	443,680	24,896	28.721	Bole (Börtala) City
Tarbaĝatay	Xinjiang	Prefecture	1,219,212	94,891	59.316	Tacheng (Qoqek) City
Karamay	Xinjiang	City	391,008	7,734	62.943	Karamay District
Changji	Xinjiang	Autonomous prefecture (Hui)	1,428,592	73,659	114.001	Changji (Sanji) City
Ürümqi*	Xinjiang	City	3,110,280	14,217	263.164	Tianshan District
Turpan	Xinjiang	City	622,679	69,620	20.858	Gaochang District
Hami	Xinjiang	City	572,400	138,919	42.357	Yizhou District
Ili	Xinjiang	Autonomous prefecture (Kazakh)	2,482,627	269,502	80.906	Yining (Ĝulja) City
Kizilsu	Xinjiang	Autonomous prefecture (Kirgiz)	525,599	70,916	10.003	Atux City
Kashgar	Xinjiang	Prefecture	3,979,362	112,058	78.012	Kashi (Kaxgar) City
Aksu	Xinjiang	Prefecture	2,370,887	128,099	81.018	Aksu City
Hotan	Xinjiang	Prefecture	2,014,365	248,946	23.405	Hotan City
Bayingolin	Xinjiang	Autonomous prefecture (Mongol)	1,278,492	472,472	103.900	Korla City
Kunming*	Yunnan	City	6,432,000	21,473	396.801	Chenggong District
Qujing	Yunnan	City	5,855,000	28,904	163.026	Qilin District
Yuxi	Yunnan	City	2,304,000	15,285	124.452	Hongta District
Baoshan	Yunnan	City	2,506,000	19,040	55.196	Longyang District
Zhaotong	Yunnan	City	5,213,000	23,192	70.838	Zhaoyang District
Lijiang	Yunnan	City	1,245,000	21,219	28.961	Gucheng District
Pu'er	Yunnan	City	2,543,000	45,385	51.401	Simao District
Lincang	Yunnan	City	2,430,000	24,469	50.212	Linxiang District
Dehong	Yunnan	Autonomous prefecture (Dai & Jingpo)	1,211,000	11,526	29.232	Mangshi
Nujiang	Yunnan	Autonomous prefecture (Lisu)	534,000	14,703	11.315	Liuku Town, Lushui County
Dêqên	Yunnan	Autonomous prefecture (Tibetan)	400,000	23,870	16.114	Shangri-La City
Dali	Yunnan	Autonomous prefecture (Bai)	3,456,000	29,459	90.010	Dali City
Chuxiong	Yunnan	Autonomous prefecture (Yi)	2,684,000	29,256	76.297	Chuxiong City
Honghe	Yunnan	Autonomous prefecture (Hani & Yi)	4,501,000	32,929	122.108	Mengzi City
Wenshan	Yunnan	Autonomous prefecture (Zhuang & Miao)	3,518,000	32,239	67.004	Wenshan City
Xishuangbanna	Yunnan	Autonomous prefecture (Dai)	1,134,000	19,700	33.591	Jinghong City
Hangzhou*	Zhejiang	City	8,700,400	16,847	1,005.358	Jianggan District
Ningbo	Zhejiang	City	7,605,700	9,365	801.149	Yinzhou District
Huzhou	Zhejiang	City	2,893,500	5,818	208.427	Wuxing District
Jiaxing	Zhejiang	City	4,501,700	3,915	351.706	Nanhu District
Jinhua	Zhejiang	City	5,361,600	10,918	340.648	Wucheng District
Lishui	Zhejiang	City	2,117,000	17,298	110.234	Liandu District
Quzhou	Zhejiang	City	2,122,700	8,846	114.616	Kecheng District
Shaoxing	Zhejiang	City	4,912,200	8,256	446.665	Yuecheng District
Taizhou, Zhejiang	Zhejiang	City	5,968,800	9,411	355.813	Jiaojiang District
Wenzhou	Zhejiang	City	9,122,100	11,784	461.984	Lucheng District
Zhoushan	Zhejiang	City	1,121,300	1,440	109.467	Dinghai District

== Dissolved prefectures ==
=== Anhui ===
Prefecture	Chinese	Founded	Dissolved	Merged division	Former status
Wudang	芜當专区	1949-10-01	1950-03-??	split among Xuancheng Pref. & Chizhou Pref.	Prefecture
Huizhou	徽州地区	1949-10-01	1987-11-??	partially merged into Xuancheng Pref. & reorganized as Huangshan PLC	Prefecture
Anqing	安庆地区	1949-10-01	1988-08-??	partially merged into Anqing & merged with Chizhou Pref.	Prefecture
Chuxian	滁县地区	1949-10-01	1992-12-??	reorganized as Chuzhou PLC	Prefecture
Fuyang	阜阳地区	1949-10-01	1996-01-??	reorganized as Fuyang PLC	Prefecture
Suxian	宿县地区	1949-10-01	1998-12-??	reorganized as Suzhou PLC	Prefecture
Chaohu	巢湖地区	1949-10-01	1999-07-09	reorganized as Chaohu PLC	Prefecture
Lu'an	六安地区	1949-10-01	1999-09-??	reorganized as Lu'an PLC	Prefecture
Chizhou	池州地区	1949-10-01	2000-06-??	reorganized as Chizou PLC	Prefecture
Xuancheng	宣城专区	1949-10-01	1952-03-??	split among Wuhu Pref. & Huizhou Pref.	Prefecture
Wuhu→Xuangcheng	芜湖→宣城地区	1949-10-01	2000-06-??	reorganized as Xuancheng PLC	Prefecture
Bengbu	蚌埠专区	1956-01-??	1961-04-??	split among Suxian Pref. & Chixian Pref.	Prefecture
Chaohu	巢湖市	1999-07-09	2011-07-14	split among Hefei PLC, Wuhu PLC, Ma'anshan PLC	PLC

=== Chahar (1949–1952) ===
Prefecture	Chinese	Founded	Dissolved	Merged division	Former status
Chanan	察南专区	1949-10-01	1951-08-??	dissolved, later merged into Zhangjiakou Pref.	Prefecture
Chabei	察北专区	1949-10-01	1952-11-??	reorganized as Zhangjiakou Pref. & Chahar Leag.	Prefecture

=== Fujian ===
Prefecture	Chinese	Founded	Dissolved	Merged division	Former status
First→Jian'ou→Jianyang	第一→建瓯→建阳专区	1949-10-01	1971-06-??	merged into Nanping Pref.	Prefecture
Second→Jianyang→Nanping	第二→建阳→南平地区	1949-10-01	1994-09-??	reorganized as Nanping PLC	Prefecture
Third→Fu'an→Ningde	第三→福安地区	1949-10-01	1999-11-??	reorganized as Ningde PLC	Prefecture
Fourth→Minhou→Putian	第四→闽侯→莆田地区	1949-10-01	1983-04-??	split among Fuzhou PLC & Jinjiang Pref.	Prefecture
Fifth→Quanzhou→Jinjiang	第五→泉州→晋江地区	1949-10-01	1985-05-??	reorganized as Quanzhou PLC	Prefecture
Sixth→Zhangzhou→Longxi	第六→漳州→龙溪地区	1949-10-01	1985-05-??	reorganized as Zhangzhou PLC	Prefecture
Seventh→Yong'an→Sanming	第七→永安→三明地区	1949-10-01	1983004--??	reorganized as Sanming PLC	Prefecture
Eighth→Longyan	第八→龙岩地区	1949-10-01	1996-11-??	reorganized as Longyan PLC	Prefecture

=== Hebei ===
Prefecture	Chinese	Founded	Dissolved	Merged division	Former status
Tongxian	通县专区	1949-10-01	1958-04-??	split among Beijing Muni., Tangshan Pref., Tianjin Pref., Chengde Pref.	Prefecture
Tianjin→Langfang	天津→廊坊地区	1949-10-01	1988-09-??	reorganized as Langfang PLC	Prefecture
Shijiazhuang	石家庄地区	1949-10-01	1993-06-??	merged into Shijiazhuang PLC	Prefecture
Tangshan	唐山地区	1949-10-01	1983-03-??	partially merged into Tangshan PLC & reorganized as Qinhuangdao PLC	Prefecture
Handan	邯郸地区	1949-10-01	1993-06-??	merged into Handan PLC	Prefecture
Xingtai	邢台地区	1949-10-01	1993-06-??	merged into Xingtai PLC	Prefecture
Baoding	保定地区	1949-10-01	1994-12-??	merged into Baoding PLC	Prefecture
Dingxian	定县专区	1949-10-01	1954-04-??	split among Shijiazhuang Pref. & Cangxian Pref.	Prefecture
Cangxian→Cangzhou	沧县→沧州地区	1949-10-01	1993-06-??	merged into Cangzhou PLC	Prefecture
Hengshui	衡水地区	1949-10-01	1996-05-??	reorganized as Hengshui PLC	Prefecture
Zhangjiakou	张家口地区	1952-11-01	1993-06-??	merged into Zhangjiakou PLC	Prefecture
Chengde	承德地区	1955-07-01	1993-06-??	merged into Chengde PLC	Prefecture
Tianjin	天津市	1958-02-11	1967-01-02	reorganized as Tianjin Muni.	PLC

=== Heilongjiang ===
Prefecture	Chinese	Founded	Dissolved	Merged division	Former status
Heihe	黑河地区	1949-10-01	1993-02-??	reorganized as Heihe PLC	Prefecture
Nenjiang	嫩江地区	1954-07-??	1984-12-??	merged into Qiqihar PLC	Prefecture
Hejiang	合江地区	1954-07-??	1984-12-??	merged into Jiamusi PLC	Prefecture
Mudanjiang	牡丹江地区	1956-03-??	1983-09-??	reorganized as Mudanjiang PLC	Prefecture
Suihua	绥化地区	1956-03-??	1999-12-??	reorganized as Suihua PLC	Prefecture
Songhuajiang	松花江地区	1958-08-??	1996-08-??	merged into Harbin PLC	Prefecture
Yichun	伊春地区	1949-10-01	1979-12-??	reorganized as Yichun PLC	Prefecture

=== Inner Mongolia ===
Prefecture	Chinese	Founded	Dissolved	Merged division	Former status
Jirem	哲里木盟	1949-10-01	1999-01-??	reorganized as Tongliao PLC	League
Hulunbuir-Nun'moron→Hulunbuir	呼伦贝尔纳文慕仁→呼伦贝尔盟	1949-10-01	2001-10-??	reorganized as Hulunbuir PLC	League
Chahar	察哈尔盟	1952-11-??	1958-04-??	merged into Xilingol Leag.	League
Ulanqab	乌兰察布盟	1954-03-06	2003-12-??	reorganized as Ulanqab PLC	League
Bayannur	巴彦淖尔盟	1954-03-06	2003-12-??	reorganized as Bayannur PLC	League
Ih'ju	伊克昭盟	1954-03-06	2001-02-??	reorganized as Ordos PLC	League
Hetao	河套行政区	1954-03-06	1958-04-??	merged into Bayannur Leag.	Region
Pingdiquan	平地泉行政区	1954-03-06	1958-04-??	merged into Ulanqab Leag.	Region
Ju'ud	昭乌达盟	1955-07-30	1983-10-??	reorganized as Chifeng PLC	League

=== Jiangsu ===
Prefecture	Chinese	Founded	Dissolved	Merged division	Former status
Huaiyin	淮阴地区	1949-10-01	1983-01-??	reorganized as Huaiyin PLC	Prefecture
Yancheng	盐城地区	1949-10-01	1983-01-??	reorganized as Yancheng PLC	Prefecture
Yangzhou	扬州地区	1949-10-01	1983-01-??	reorganized as Yangzhou PLC	Prefecture
Nantong	南通地区	1949-10-01	1983-01-??	merged into Nantong PLC	Prefecture
Zhenjiang	镇江地区	1949-10-01	1983-01-??	partially split among Nanjing PLC, Wuxi PLC, Changzhou PLC & reorganized as Zhenjiang PLC	Prefecture
Changzhou	常州专区	1949-10-01	1959-07-??	split among Zhenjiang Pref. & Suzhou Pref.	Prefecture
Songjiang	松江专区	1949-10-01	1958-03-??	split among Shanghai Muni. & Suzhou Pref.	Prefecture
Suzhou	苏州地区	1949-10-01	1983-01-??	split among Suzhou PLC & Wuxi PLC	Prefecture
Xuzhou	徐州地区	1953-03-??	1983-01-??	split among Xuzhou PLC & Lianyungang PLC	Prefecture
Luhe	六合地区	1966-03-??	1971-02-??	split among Nanjing PLC, Yangzhou Pref., Huaiyin Pref.	Prefecture

=== Jiangxi ===
Prefecture	Chinese	Founded	Dissolved	Merged division	Former status
Nanchang→Yichun	南昌→宜春地区	1949-10-01	2000-05-??	reorganized as Yichuan PLC	Prefecture
Yuanzhou	袁州专区	1949-10-01	1952-10-??	merged into Nanchang Pref.	Prefecture
Jiujiang	九江地区	1949-10-01	1983-07-??	merged into Jiujiang PLC	Prefecture
Leping→Fuliang→Yingtan	乐平→浮梁→鹰潭专区	1949-10-01	1952-12-06	merged into Shangrao Pref.	Prefecture
Shangrao	上饶地区	1949-10-01	2000-06-??	reorganized as Shangrao PLC	Prefecture
Ganzhou	赣州地区	1949-10-01	1998-12-??	reorganized as Ganzhou PLC	Prefecture
Ruijin→Ningdu	瑞金→宁都专区	1949-10-01	1952-10-??	split among Ganzhou Pref. & Fuzhou Pref.	Prefecture
Fuzhou	抚州地区	1949-10-01	2000-06-??	reorganized as Fuzhou PLC	Prefecture
Ji'an→Jinggangshan→Ji'an	吉安→井冈山→吉安地区	1949-10-01	2000-05-??	reorganized as Ji'an PLC	Prefecture

=== Jilin ===
Prefecture	Chinese	Founded	Dissolved	Merged division	Former status
Tonghua	通化地区	1949-10-01	1985-02-??	reorganized as Tonghua PLC, Hunjiang PLC, Meihekou PLC	Prefecture
Yanbian	延边专区	1949-10-01	1952-08-??	converted into Autonomous Pref.	Prefecture
Baicheng	白城地区	1949-10-01	1993-06-??	reorganized as Baicheng PLC	Prefecture
Huaide→Gongzhuling→Siping	怀德→公主岭→四平地区	1949-10-01	1983-08-??	reorganized as Siping PLC & Liaoyuan PLC	Prefecture
Dehui	德惠地区	1949-10-01	1983-08-??	merged into Changchun PLC	Prefecture
Yongji	永吉地区	1949-10-01	1983-08-??	merged into Jilin PLC	Prefecture
Meihekou	梅河口市	1985-02-04	1985-12-19	merged into Tonghua PLC	PLC
Gongzhuling	公主岭市	1985-02-04	1985-12-19	merged into Siping PLC	PLC

=== Liaodong (1949–1954) ===
Prefecture	Chinese	Founded	Dissolved	Merged division	Former status
Tongliao	通辽专区	1949-10-01	1950-04-21	dissolved, later reorganized as Tonghua Pref. & Andong Pref.	Prefecture

=== Liaoning ===
Prefecture	Chinese	Founded	Dissolved	Merged division	Former status
Jinzhou	锦州专区	1955-11-??	1968-??-??	merged into Jinzhou PLC	Prefecture
Andong	安东专区	1956-01-??	1959-01-??	split among Lüda PLC, Andong PLC, Benxi PLC	Prefecture
Liaonan	辽南专区	1966-01-??	1968-06-??	split among Lüda PLC & Yingkou PLC	Prefecture
Liaoyang	辽阳专区	1956-01-??	1959-01-??	split among Lüda PLC, Shenyang PLC, Anshan PLC, Yingkou PLC, Liaoyang PLC	Prefecture
Tieling	铁岭地区	1956-01-??	1984-06-??	reorganized as Tieling PLC	Prefecture
Shenyang	沈阳专区	1964-02-??	1968-??-??	merged with Tieling Pref.	Prefecture
Chaoyang	朝阳地区	1954-02-??	1984-06-??	reorganized as Chaoyang PLC	Prefecture
Panjin	盘锦地区	1970-01-??	1975-11-??	split among Anshan PLC & Yingkou PLC	Prefecture

=== Rehe (1949–1955) ===
Prefecture	Chinese	Founded	Dissolved	Merged division	Former status
Redong	热东专区	1949-10-01	1955-07-30	reorganized as Chaoyang Pref. & Jinzhou Pref.	Prefecture
Rezhong	热中专区	1949-10-01	1955-07-30	dissolved, later merged into Chengde Pref.	Prefecture
Reliao	热辽专区	1949-10-01	1955-07-30	reorganized as Chaoyang Pref. & Jinzhou Pref.	Prefecture
Ju'ud	昭乌达盟	1949-10-01	1955-07-30	transfer to Inner Mongolia AR	League

=== Shandong ===
Prefecture	Chinese	Founded	Dissolved	Merged division	Former status
Changwei→Weifang	昌潍→潍坊地区	1949-10-01	1983-08-??	reorganized as Weifang PLC	Prefecture
Donghai→Wendeng	东海→文登专区	1949-10-01	1956-02-??	merged into Laiyang Pref.	Prefecture
Xihai	西海专区	1949-10-01	1950-05-??	split among Laiyang Pref. & Changwei Pref.	Prefecture
Nanhai	南海专区	1949-10-01	1950-05-??	split among Laiyang Pref. & Jiaozhou Pref.	Prefecture
Beihai	北海专区	1949-10-01	1950-05-??	split among Laiyang Pref. & Wendeng Pref.	Prefecture
Binbei→Jiaozhou	滨北→胶州专区	1949-10-01	1956-02-??	split among Laiyang Pref. Wendeng Pref., Linyi Pref.	Prefecture
Cangnan	沧南专区	1949-10-01	1950-05-??	merged into Dezhou Pref.	Prefecture
Luobei	泺北专区	1949-10-01	1950-05-??	merged into Dezhou Pref.	Prefecture
Qinghe	清河专区	1949-10-01	1950-05-??	split among Zibo Pref., Huimin Pref., Changwei Pref.	Prefecture
Kenli→Huimin→Binzhou	垦利→惠民→滨州地区	1949-10-01	2000-06-??	reorganized as Binzhou PLC	Prefecture
Yimeng→Yishui	沂蒙→沂水专区	1949-10-01	1953-07-??	split among Linyi Pref. & Jiaozhou Pref.	Prefecture
Nishan	尼山专区	1949-10-01	1950-05-??	split among Tengxian Pref. & Tai'an Pref.	Prefecture
Taizao	台枣专区	1949-10-01	1950-05-??	split among Tengxian Pref. & Linyi Pref.	Prefecture
Binhai	滨海专区	1949-10-01	1950-05-??	split among Linyi Pref. & Yishui Pref.	Prefecture
Taishan→Tai'an	泰山→泰安地区	1949-10-01	1985-03-??	partially split among Jinan PLC & Jining PLC & reorganized as Tai'an PLC	Prefecture
Taixi	泰西专区	1949-10-01	1950-05-??	merged into Tai'an Pref.	Prefecture
Liaocheng	聊城地区	1949-10-01	1997-08-??	reorganized as Liaocheng PLC	Prefecture
Heze	菏泽地区	1949-10-01	2000-06-??	reorganized as Heze PLC	Prefecture
Huxi	湖西专区	1949-10-01	1951-11-??	merged into Heze Pref.	Prefecture
Zibo	淄博专区	1950-05-??	1961-05-??	partially merged into Huimin Pref. & reorganized as Zibo PLC	Prefecture
Tengxian→Jining	滕县→济宁地区	1950-05-??	1983-03-??	partially merged into Tai'an Pref. & reorganized as Jining PLC	Prefecture
Laiyang→Yantai	莱阳→烟台地区	1950-05-??	1983-08-??	reorganized as Yantai PLC	Prefecture
Linyi	临沂地区	1950-05-??	1994-12-??	reorganized as Linyi PLC	Prefecture
Dezhou	莱芜	1950-05-??	1994-12-??	reorganized as Dezhou PLC	Prefecture
Laiwu	莱芜市	1992-11-22	2019-01-09	merged into Jinan PLC	PLC

=== Shanxi ===
Prefecture	Chinese	Founded	Dissolved	Merged division	Former status
Yanbei	雁北地区	1949-10-01	1993-06-??	merged into Datong PLC & Shuozhou PLC	Prefecture
Xinxian→Xinzhou	忻县→忻州地区	1949-10-01	2000-06-??	reorganized as Xinzhou PLC	Prefecture
Changzhi→Jindongnan	长治→晋东南地区	1949-10-01	1985-04-??	reorganized as Changzhi PLC & Jincheng PLC	Prefecture
Yuci→Jinzhong	榆次→晋中地区	1949-10-01	1999-09-??	reorganized as Jinzhong PLC	Prefecture
Yuncheng	运城地区	1949-10-01	2000-06-??	reorganized as Yuncheng PLC	Prefecture
Linfen	临汾专区	1949-10-01	1954-04-??	merged into Jinnan Pref.	Prefecture
Fenyang	汾阳专区	1949-10-01	1951-03-??	split among Datong PLC, Linfen Pref., Xingxian Pref., Yuci Pref.	Prefecture
Xingxian	兴县专区	1949-10-01	1952-06-??	split among Xinxian Pref. & Yuci Pref.	Prefecture
Jinnan	晋南地区	1954-04-??	1970-03-??	partially merged into Yuncheng Pref. & reorganized as Linfen Pref.	Prefecture
Jinbei	晋北专区	1958-06-??	1961-06-??	split among Yanbei Pref. & Xinxian Pref.	Prefecture
Linfen	临汾地区	1970-03-??	2000-06-??	reorganized as Linfen PLC	Prefecture
Lüliang	吕梁地区	1971-04-??	2003-10-??	reorganized as Lüliang PLC	Prefecture

=== Songjiang (1949–1954) ===
Prefecture	Chinese	Founded	Dissolved	Merged division	Former status
Hejiang	合江专区	1949-10-01	1954-07-??	transfer to Heilongjiang Prov.	Prefecture

=== Suiyuan (1949–1954) ===
Prefecture	Chinese	Founded	Dissolved	Merged division	Former status
Suidong→Jining	绥东→集宁专区	1949-10-01	1952-11-??	reorganized as Pingdiquan Reg.	Prefecture
Helin	和林专区	1949-10-01	1952--??	split among	Prefecture
Baotou→Suizhong→Saxian	包头→绥中→萨县专区	1949-10-01	1952-11-??	merged into Jining Pref.	Prefecture
Suixi→Shanba	绥西→陕坝专区	1949-10-01	1952-11-??	reorganized as Hetao Reg.	Prefecture
Ih'ju	伊克昭盟	1949-10-01	1954-03-06	transfer to Inner Mongolia AR	League
Ulanqab	乌兰察布盟	1949-10-01	1954-03-06	transfer to Inner Mongolia AR	League

=== Zhejiang ===
Prefecture	Chinese	Founded	Dissolved	Merged division	Former status
Lin'an	临安专区	1949-10-01	1953-01-??	split among Jinhua Pref. & Jiaxing Pref.	Prefecture
Jiande	建德专区	1949-10-01	1958-12-??	split among Hangzhou PLC, Jinhua Pref., Jiaxing Pref.	Prefecture
Ningbo	宁波地区	1949-10-01	1983-07-??	merged into Ningbo PLC	Prefecture
Wenzhou	温州地区	1949-10-01	1981-09-??	merged into Wenzhou PLC	Prefecture
Jiaxing	嘉兴地区	1949-10-01	1981-09-??	reorganized as Jiaxing PLC & Huzhou PLC	Prefecture
Shaoxing	绍兴地区	1949-10-01	1983-07-??	reorganized as Shaoxing PLC	Prefecture
Jinhua	金华地区	1949-10-01	1985-05-??	reorganized as Jinhua PLC & Quzhou PLC	Prefecture
Quzhou	衢州专区	1949-10-01	1954-11-??	split among Jinhua Pfre. & Jiande Pref.	Prefecture
Taizhou	台州地区	1949-10-01	1994-08-??	reorganized as Taizhou PLC	Prefecture
Lishui	丽水地区	1949-10-01	2000-05-??	reorganized as Lishui PLC	Prefecture
Zhoushan	舟山地区	1953-06-01	1987-01-??	reorganized as Zhoushan PLC	Prefecture

== See also ==
- Prefectures of China
- Administrative divisions of China
- Sub-provincial divisions in China
- Prefecture-level city
- Provincial city
- List of top Chinese cities by GDP
- List of top Chinese cities by GDP per capita
- List of prefecture-level divisions of China by GDP
- List of cities in China by population
- List of cities in China
- List of twin towns and sister cities in China
- List of capitals in China
- Sub-provincial divisions in Mainland China
- List of urban agglomerations in China
- Global city
