= 2010 Tibetan language protest =

Series of protests in China

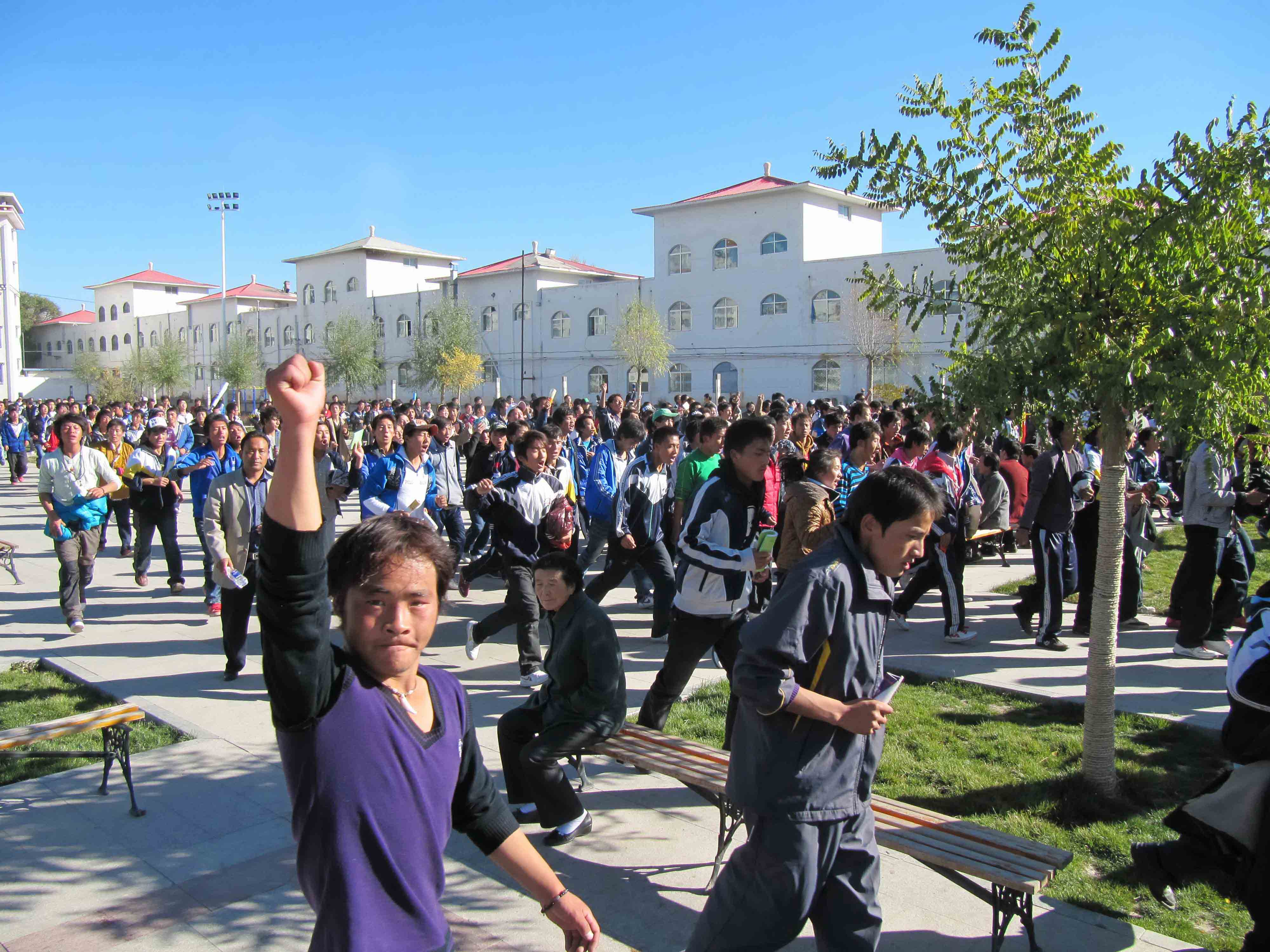
An estimated 2,000 students from four schools in Chabcha town, Chabcha county of Hainan Tibetan Autonomous Prefecture protested on the streets of Chabcha on 20 October

The 2010 Tibetan language protest was a series of protests in Tongren County, Gonghe County and Maqên County, in Qinghai Province; Minzu University of China in Beijing; and Xiahe County in Gansu Province, People's Republic of China by ethnic Tibetan students over the period of October 20 through October 27, 2010.

== Causes ==
- The local government in Qinghai pushed for a "bilingual" education in a then newly drafted educational policy, that is, only Tibetan language and English courses are to be taught in Tibetan, courses other than Tibetan and English were to be taught in Standard Mandarin.
- The July 25, 2010 mass assembly, which took place in Guangzhou, Guangdong Province in protest against the perceived encroachment of Standard Mandarin on Cantonese language may have provided inspiration and encouragement for Tibetan people to voice their dissatisfaction.

== Protests ==
A range of reports from hundreds to 9000 people were alleged to have been involved in the protest. According to a local Tibetan blogger, the head of the county's education department drove out and assured the protesters that "their grievances would be addressed by senior officials". A series of apparently related protests inspired by this took place in Gonghe County on October 20; in Maqên County in the neighboring Golog Tibetan Autonomous Prefecture on October 21; in Xiahe County on October 25. 400 Tibetan students also staged a supportive demonstration on October 22 on the campus of Minzu University of China in Beijing.

== Official response ==
On October 29, the Government of Qinghai said these incidents reflect some misunderstandings of the bilingual education policy by Tibetan people and reiterated that "The guiding ideology and the basic principles of strengthening and improving the bilingual education is completely correct" and that "as the state is promoting the use of Standard Mandarin and Chinese characters, the right of using the local minority languages by minority peoples should be sufficiently respected and protected".

== See also ==
- Amdo Tibetan language
- Self-immolation protests by Tibetans in China
