= Heimahe Township, Qinghai =

Heimahe Township 黑马河镇
- Township
- Heimahexiang
- Location in Qinghai
- Coordinates: 36°43′44″N 99°46′45″E
- Country: People's Republic of China
- Province: Qinghai
- Autonomous prefecture: Hainan Tibetan Autonomous Prefecture
- County: Gonghe County

Area
  - Total: 1,160 km^{2} (450 sq mi)

Population (2010)
  - Total: 5,163
  - Density: 4.45/km^{2} (11.5/sq mi)
- Time zone: UTC+8 (China Standard)
- Local dialing code: 974

Heimahe Township (Chinese: 黑马河镇) is a township in Gonghe County, Hainan Tibetan Autonomous Prefecture, Qinghai, China. In 2010, Heimahe Township had a total population of 5,163: 2,576 males and 2,587 females: 1,405 aged under 14, 3,527 aged between 15 and 65 and 231 aged over 65.
