= Shazhuyu Township, Qinghai =

Shazhuyu Township 沙珠玉乡
- Township
- Shazhuyuxiang
- Location in Qinghai
- Coordinates: 36°15′54″N 100°15′49″E
- Country: People's Republic of China
- Province: Qinghai
- Autonomous prefecture: Hainan Tibetan Autonomous Prefecture
- County: Gonghe County

Area
  - Total: 544.1 km^{2} (210.1 sq mi)

Population (2010)
  - Total: 5,153
  - Density: 9.471/km^{2} (24.53/sq mi)
- Time zone: UTC+8 (China Standard)
- Local dialing code: 974

Shazhuyu Township (Chinese: 沙珠玉乡) is a township in Gonghe County, Hainan Tibetan Autonomous Prefecture, Qinghai, China. In 2010, Shazhuyu Township had a total population of 5,153: 2,638 males and 2,515 females: 1,057 aged under 14, 3,789 aged between 15 and 65 and 307 aged over 65.

== Climate ==
Shazhuyu has a subarctic climate (Köppen climate classification Dwc). The average annual temperature in Shazhuyu is 1.2 °C (34.2 °F). The temperatures are highest on average in July, at around 12.1 °C (53.8 °F), and lowest in January, at around −11.2 °C (11.8 °F).

Climate data for Shazhuyu (1981−2010 normals, extremes 1981−2010)
| Month | Jan | Feb | Mar | Apr | May | Jun | Jul | Aug | Sep | Oct | Nov | Dec | Year |
|---|---|---|---|---|---|---|---|---|---|---|---|---|---|
| Record high °C (°F) | 12.4 (54.3) | 11.1 (52.0) | 19.3 (66.7) | 20.8 (69.4) | 25.9 (78.6) | 24.7 (76.5) | 26.0 (78.8) | 26.7 (80.1) | 26.0 (78.8) | 20.6 (69.1) | 12.0 (53.6) | 10.2 (50.4) | 26.7 (80.1) |
| Mean daily maximum °C (°F) | −2.5 (27.5) | 0.5 (32.9) | 5.6 (42.1) | 10.1 (50.2) | 14.1 (57.4) | 16.1 (61.0) | 18.1 (64.6) | 18.6 (65.5) | 14.3 (57.7) | 9.3 (48.7) | 3.6 (38.5) | −1.0 (30.2) | 8.9 (48.0) |
| Daily mean °C (°F) | −11.6 (11.1) | −7.8 (18.0) | −2.5 (27.5) | 2.9 (37.2) | 7.4 (45.3) | 10.1 (50.2) | 12.1 (53.8) | 11.5 (52.7) | 7.1 (44.8) | 1.4 (34.5) | −5.6 (21.9) | −10.2 (13.6) | 1.2 (34.2) |
| Mean daily minimum °C (°F) | −19.4 (−2.9) | −15.5 (4.1) | −9.8 (14.4) | −4.1 (24.6) | 0.6 (33.1) | 4.4 (39.9) | 6.2 (43.2) | 4.9 (40.8) | 1.1 (34.0) | −4.9 (23.2) | −12.9 (8.8) | −17.8 (0.0) | −5.6 (21.9) |
| Record low °C (°F) | −29.4 (−20.9) | −27.2 (−17.0) | −23.4 (−10.1) | −14.9 (5.2) | −8.1 (17.4) | −3.0 (26.6) | −0.9 (30.4) | −4.3 (24.3) | −7.8 (18.0) | −18.9 (−2.0) | −25.7 (−14.3) | −28.5 (−19.3) | −29.4 (−20.9) |
| Average precipitation mm (inches) | 1.4 (0.06) | 4.2 (0.17) | 6.6 (0.26) | 18.3 (0.72) | 26.7 (1.05) | 55.8 (2.20) | 111.4 (4.39) | 96.2 (3.79) | 70.7 (2.78) | 27.9 (1.10) | 10.1 (0.40) | 5.6 (0.22) | 434.9 (17.14) |
| Average precipitation days (≥ 1.0 mm) | 0.6 | 0.9 | 1.1 | 3.1 | 7.8 | 10.1 | 20.3 | 15.6 | 12.1 | 3.8 | 2.2 | 1.6 | 79.2 |
| Average relative humidity (%) | 39 | 36 | 36 | 42 | 54 | 65 | 70 | 68 | 67 | 54 | 39 | 39 | 51 |
Source: China Meteorological Data Service Center
