= Niandi Township, Qinghai =

Niandi Township 廿地乡
- Township
- Niandixiang
- Location in Qinghai
- Coordinates: 36°22′30″N 100°23′31″E
- Country: People's Republic of China
- Province: Qinghai
- Autonomous prefecture: Hainan Tibetan Autonomous Prefecture
- County: Gonghe County

Area
  - Total: 731.5 km^{2} (282.4 sq mi)

Population (2010)
  - Total: 4,072
  - Density: 5.567/km^{2} (14.42/sq mi)
- Time zone: UTC+8 (China Standard)
- Local dialing code: 974

Niandi Township (Chinese: 廿地乡) is a township in Gonghe County, Hainan Tibetan Autonomous Prefecture, Qinghai, China. In 2010, Niandi Township had a total population of 4,072: 2,099 males and 1,973 females: 930 aged under 14, 2,887 aged between 15 and 65 and 255 aged over 65.
