= Qieji Township, Qinghai =

Qieji Township 切吉乡
- Township
- Qiejixiang
- Location in Qinghai
- Coordinates: 36°18′57″N 99°40′48″E
- Country: People's Republic of China
- Province: Qinghai
- Autonomous prefecture: Hainan Tibetan Autonomous Prefecture
- County: Gonghe County

Area
  - Total: 4,022 km^{2} (1,553 sq mi)

Population (2010)
  - Total: 8,948
  - Density: 2.225/km^{2} (5.762/sq mi)
- Time zone: UTC+8 (China Standard)
- Local dialing code: 974

Qieji Township (Chinese: 切吉乡) is a township in Gonghe County, Hainan Tibetan Autonomous Prefecture, Qinghai, China. In 2010, Qieji Township had a total population of 8,948: 4,492 males and 2,456 females: 2,375 aged under 14, 6,233 aged between 15 and 65 and 340 aged over 65.
