= Longyangxia =

Longyangxia may refer to:

- Longyangxia, Qinghai
- Longyangxia Dam
