= Jiangxigou Township, Qinghai =

Jiangxigou Township 江西沟乡
- Township
- Jiangxigouxiang
- Location in Qinghai
- Coordinates: 36°37′9″N 100°16′39″E
- Country: People's Republic of China
- Province: Qinghai
- Autonomous prefecture: Hainan Tibetan Autonomous Prefecture
- County: Gonghe County

Area
  - Total: 662.8 km^{2} (255.9 sq mi)

Population (2010)
  - Total: 6,116
  - Density: 9.228/km^{2} (23.90/sq mi)
- Time zone: UTC+8 (China Standard)
- Local dialing code: 974

Jiangxigou Township (Chinese: 江西沟乡) is a township in Gonghe County, Hainan Tibetan Autonomous Prefecture, Qinghai, China. In 2010, Jiangxigou Township had a total population of 6,116: 3,052 males and 3,064 females: 1,708 aged under 14, 4,130 aged between 15 and 65 and 278 aged over 65.
