= Daotanghe, Qinghai =

Daotanghe 倒淌河镇
- Town
- Daotanghezhen
- Location in Qinghai
- Coordinates: 36°23′54″N 100°58′15″E
- Country: People's Republic of China
- Province: Qinghai
- Autonomous prefecture: Hainan Tibetan Autonomous Prefecture
- County: Gonghe County

Area
  - Total: 1,181 km^{2} (456 sq mi)

Population (2010)
  - Total: 10,437
  - Density: 8.837/km^{2} (22.89/sq mi)
- Time zone: UTC+8 (China Standard)
- Local dialing code: 974

Daotanghe (Chinese: 倒淌河镇, Pinyin: Dàotānghézhèn) is a town in Gonghe County, Hainan Tibetan Autonomous Prefecture, Qinghai, China. Possibly known amongst local Tibetans as "Rigamo". In 2010, Daotanghe had a total population of 10,437: 5,455 males and 4,982 females: 2,678 aged under 14, 7,257 aged between 15 and 65 and 502 aged over 65.
