= List of prefecture-level divisions of China by GDP =

The following article lists all prefecture-level divisions of China, including Prefecture-level cities, Autonomous prefectures and prefectures, by GDP and GDP per capita.

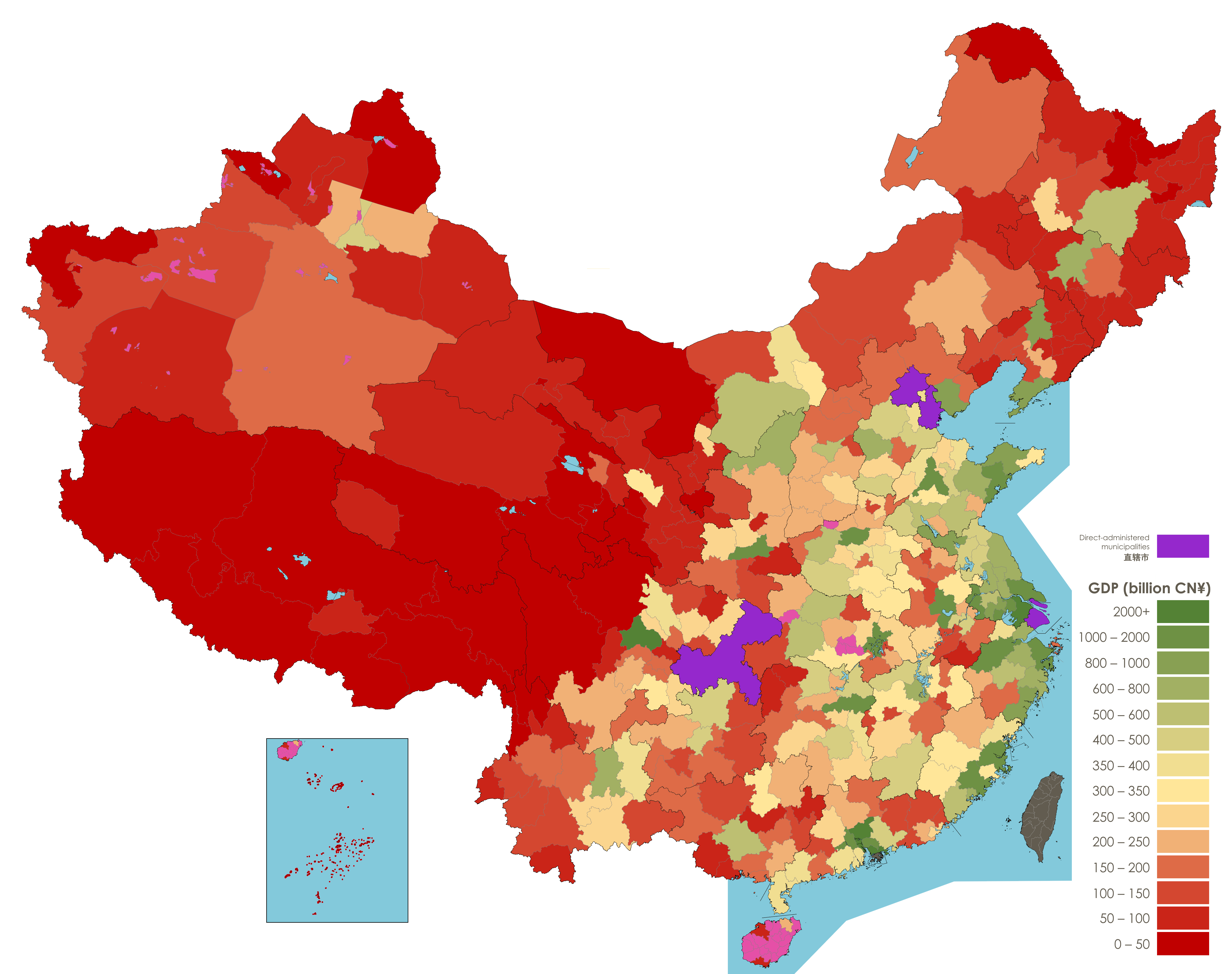
A map of prefecture-level divisions of China by GDP (not including direct-administered municipalities)

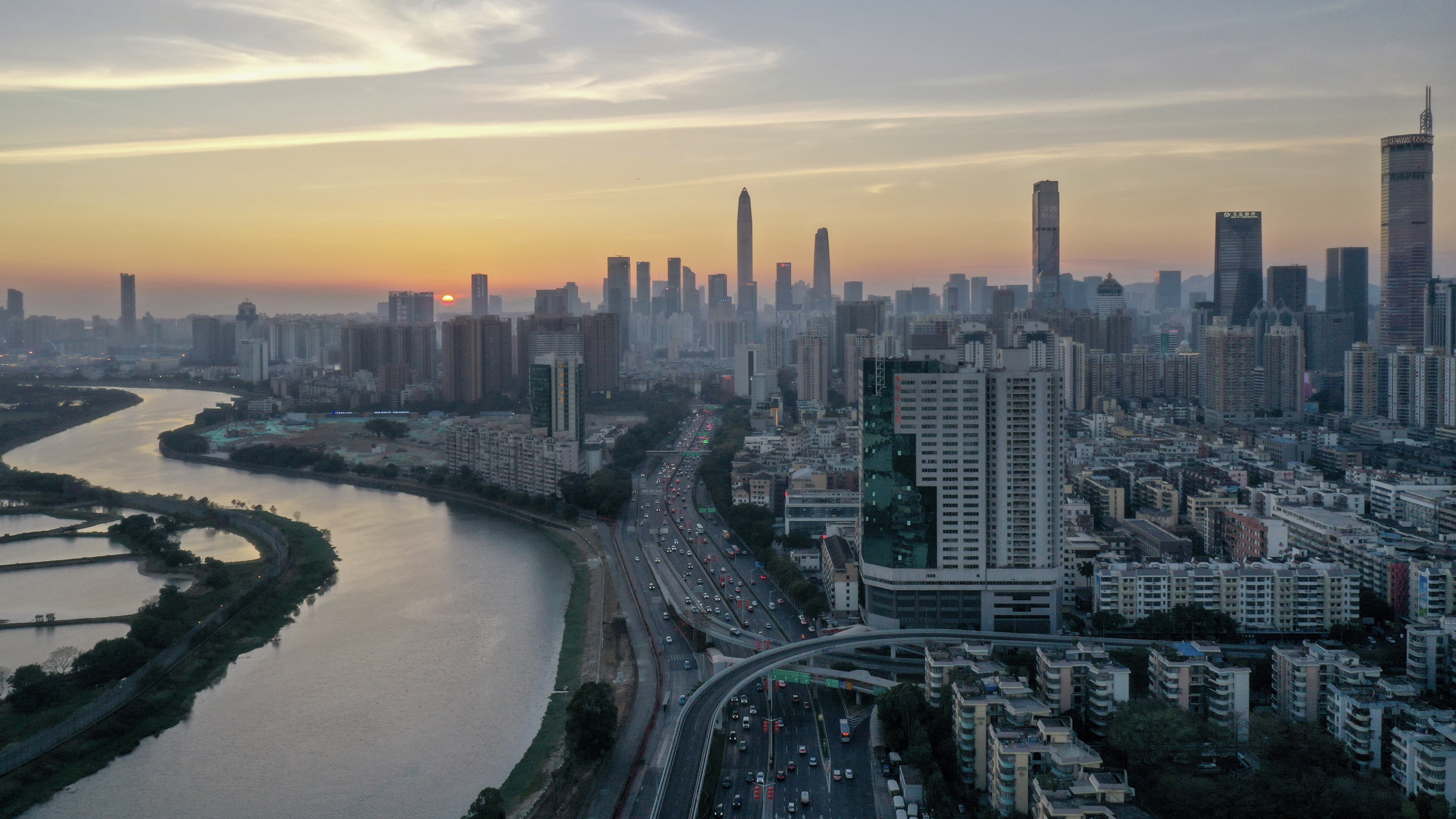
Shenzhen prefecture-level city has the largest GDP in China (CN¥ 3.2 trillion)

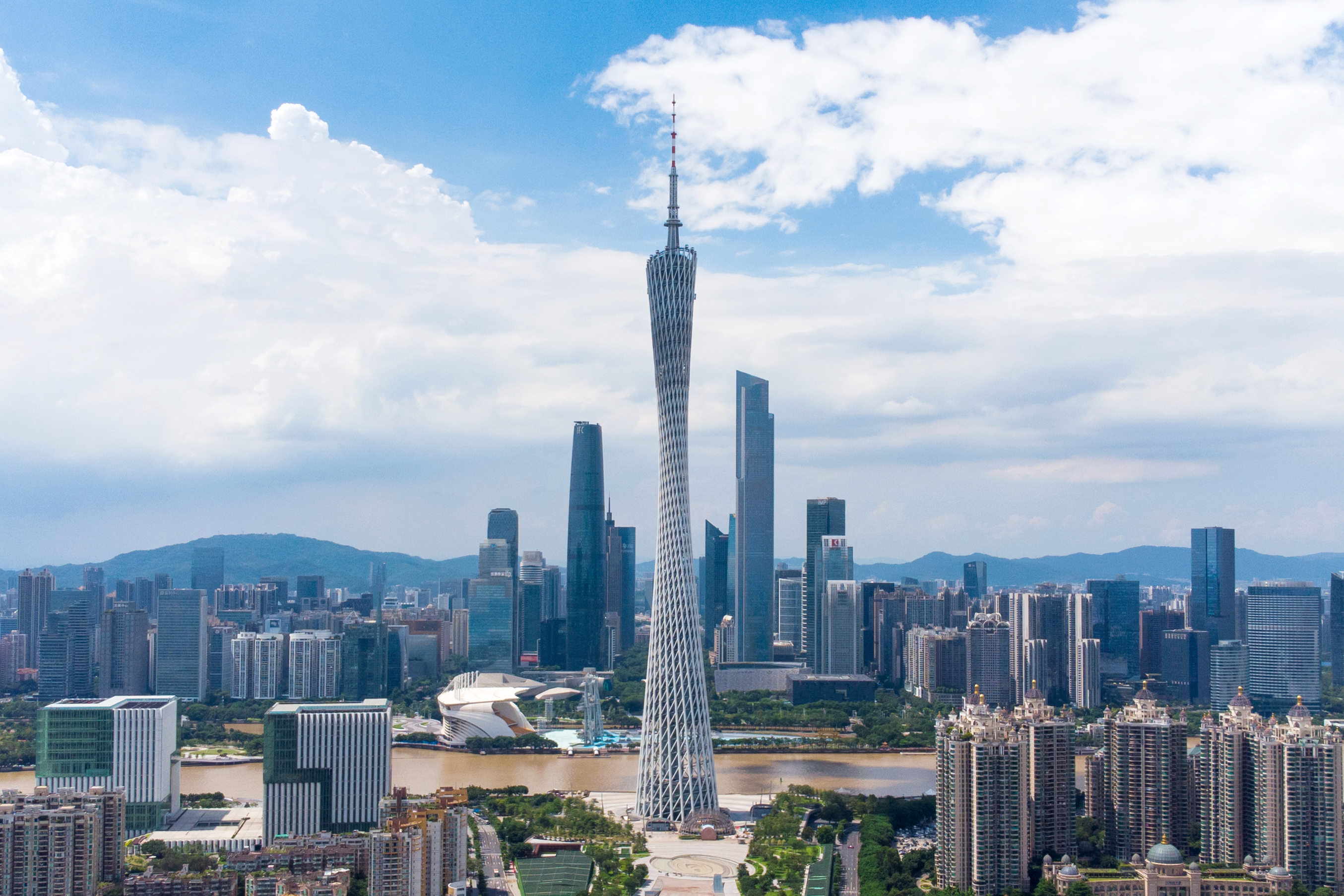
Guangzhou prefecture-level city has second-largest GDP in China (CN¥ 2.9 trillion)

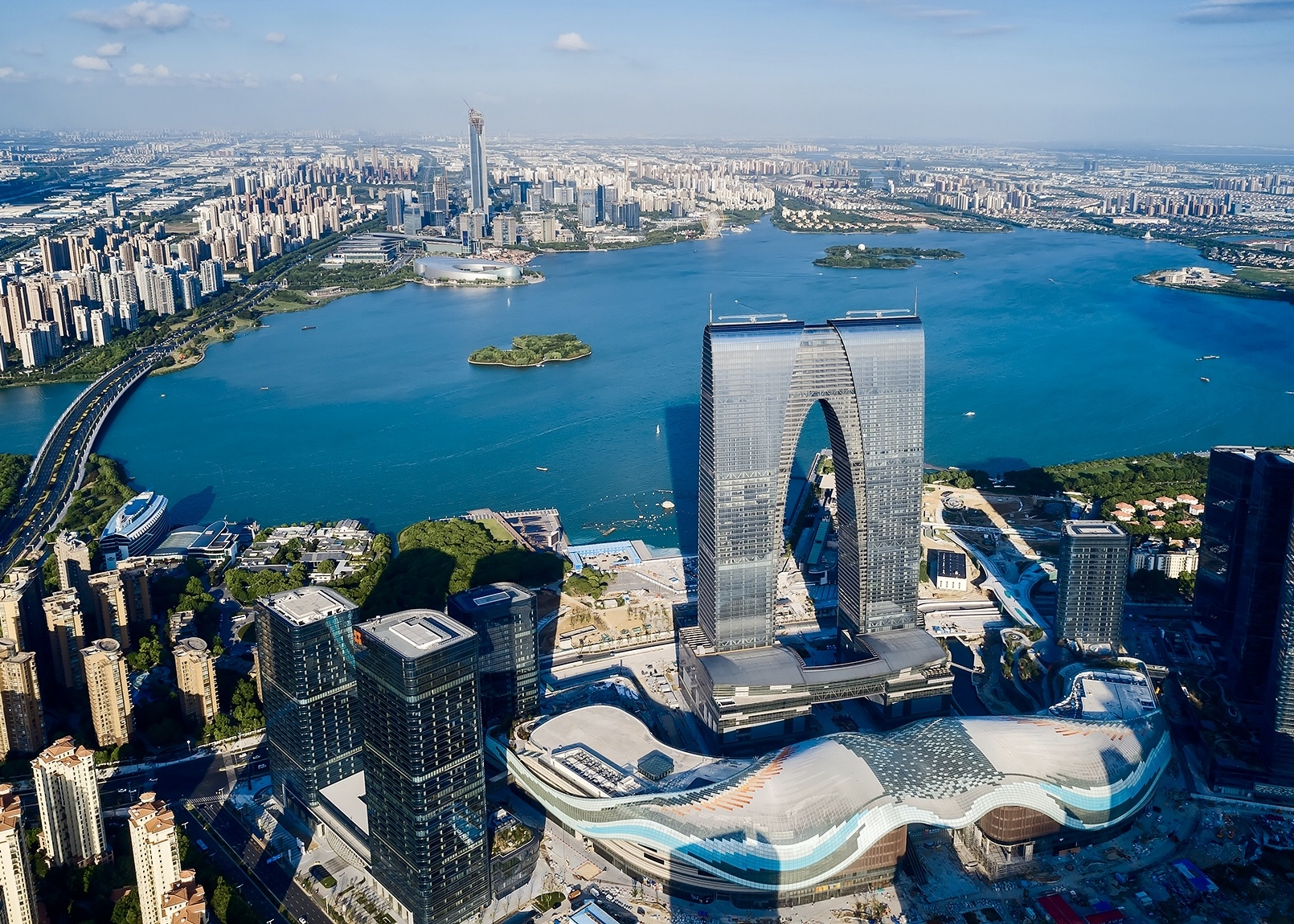
Suzhou prefecture-level city has third-largest GDP in China (CN¥ 2.4 trillion)

== List ==
Notes

- Municipalities (Beijing, Chongqing, Shanghai, & Tianjin) are not included but their internal divisions are similar as those of prefectures.
- * Indicates capital of province.
- Bold: indicates sub-provincial city or above.

Name	Province	Type	GDP (billion CN¥)	GDP (billion US$)	GDP per capita (CN¥)	GDP per capita (US$)	Date
Hefei*	Anhui	City	1,141.3	145.0	120,579	18,691	2021
Anqing	Anhui	City	265.7	34.5	63,699	9,874	2021
Bengbu	Anhui	City	198.9	29.3	59,963	9,295	2021
Bozhou	Anhui	City	197.3	26.2	39,564	6,133	2021
Chizhou	Anhui	City	100.4	12.4	75,446	11,695	2021
Chuzhou	Anhui	City	336.2	42.7	84,263	13,062	2021
Fuyang	Anhui	City	307.2	39.5	37,591	5,827	2021
Huaibei	Anhui	City	122.3	16.2	61,956	9,604	2021
Huainan	Anhui	City	145.7	18.9	47,929	7,430	2021
Huangshan	Anhui	City	95.7	12.3	71,875	11,141	2021
Lu'an	Anhui	City	192.3	24.2	43,666	6,769	2021
Ma'anshan	Anhui	City	243.9	30.5	113,089	17,530	2021
Suzhou, Anhui	Anhui	City	216.7	28.5	40,707	6,310	2021
Tongling	Anhui	City	116.6	14.5	89,248	13,834	2021
Wuhu	Anhui	City	430.3	53.8	117,174	18,163	2021
Xuancheng	Anhui	City	183.4	23.1	73,740	11,430	2021
Fuzhou, Fujian*	Fujian	City	1,292.8	187.4	152,846	22,156	2023
**Xiamen**	Fujian	City	780.3	113.1	147,387	21,364	2022
Longyan	Fujian	City	331.8	48.1	122,683	17,783	2023
Nanping	Fujian	City	221.2	32.1	83,136	12,051	2022
Ningde	Fujian	City	380.7	55.2	120,600	17,481	2023
Putian	Fujian	City	311.6	45.2	97,095	14,074	2022
Quanzhou	Fujian	City	1,217.2	176.4	137,060	19,867	2023
Sanming	Fujian	City	311.0	45.1	126,044	18,270	2022
Zhangzhou	Fujian	City	572.8	83.0	113,087	16,392	2023
Jiuquan	Gansu	City	84.1	12.2	79,840	11,573	2022
Jiayuguan	Gansu	City	36.3	5.3	114,810	16,643	2022
Zhangye	Gansu	City	58.2	8.4	51,861	7,518	2022
Jinchang	Gansu	City	52.3	7.6	120,161	17,418	2022
Wuwei	Gansu	City	66.3	9.6	45,932	6,658	2022
Baiyin	Gansu	City	63.6	9.2	42,297	6,131	2022
Lanzhou*	Gansu	City	334.3	48.5	75,992	11,016	2022
Gannan	Gansu	Autonomous prefecture (Tibetan)	24.5	3.6	35,662	5,169	2022
Dingxi	Gansu	City	55.8	8.1	22,257	3,226	2022
Linxia	Gansu	Autonomous prefecture (Hui)	40.9	5.9	19,271	2,793	2022
Longnan	Gansu	City	56.2	8.1	23,548	3,413	2022
Tianshui	Gansu	City	81.4	11.8	27,538	3,992	2022
Pingliang	Gansu	City	64.2	9.3	35,182	5,100	2022
Qingyang	Gansu	City	102.2	14.8	47,351	6,864	2022
Qingyuan	Guangdong	City	203.2	30.2	51,001	7,581	2022
Shaoguan	Guangdong	City	156.4	23.3	54,665	8,126	2022
Heyuan	Guangdong	City	129.5	19.2	45,563	6,773	2022
Meizhou	Guangdong	City	131.8	19.6	34,085	5,067	2022
Chaozhou	Guangdong	City	131.3	19.5	50,988	7,579	2022
Zhaoqing	Guangdong	City	270.5	40.2	65,513	9,739	2022
Yunfu	Guangdong	City	116.2	17.3	48,538	7,215	2022
Foshan	Guangdong	City	1,269.8	188.8	132,517	19,699	2022
**Guangzhou***	Guangdong	City	2,883.9	428.8	153,625	22,837	2022
Dongguan	Guangdong	City	1,120.0	166.5	106,803	15,877	2022
Huizhou	Guangdong	City	540.1	80.3	89,157	13,253	2022
Shanwei	Guangdong	City	132.2	19.7	49,242	7,320	2022
Jieyang	Guangdong	City	226.1	33.6	40,192	5,975	2022
Shantou	Guangdong	City	301.7	44.9	54,504	8,102	2022
Zhanjiang	Guangdong	City	371.3	55.2	52,787	7,847	2022
Maoming	Guangdong	City	390.5	58.1	62,685	9,318	2022
Yangjiang	Guangdong	City	153.5	22.8	58,556	8,704	2022
Jiangmen	Guangdong	City	377.3	56.1	78,146	11,617	2022
Zhongshan	Guangdong	City	363.1	54.0	81,620	12,133	2022
Zhuhai	Guangdong	City	404.5	60.1	163,654	24,328	2022
**Shenzhen**	Guangdong	City	3,238.8	481.5	183,274	27,244	2022
Baise	Guangxi	City	156.9	24.3	43,892	6,803	2021
Hechi	Guangxi	City	104.2	16.2	30,461	4,722	2021
Liuzhou	Guangxi	City	305.7	47.4	73,328	11,366	2021
Guilin	Guangxi	City	231.1	35.8	46,767	7,249	2021
Hezhou	Guangxi	City	90.9	14.1	45,044	6,982	2021
Chongzuo	Guangxi	City	98.9	15.3	47,336	7,337	2021
Nanning*	Guangxi	City	512.1	79.4	58,241	9,028	2021
Laibin	Guangxi	City	83.3	12.9	40,091	6,214	2021
Guigang	Guangxi	City	150.2	23.3	34,632	5,368	2021
Wuzhou	Guangxi	City	136.9	21.2	48,463	7,512	2021
Fangchenggang	Guangxi	City	81.6	12.6	77,548	12,020	2021
Qinzhou	Guangxi	City	164.8	25.5	49,804	7,720	2021
Beihai	Guangxi	City	150.4	23.3	80,710	12,510	2021
Yulin, Guangxi	Guangxi	City	207.1	32.1	35,639	5,524	2021
Bijie	Guizhou	City	220.7	32.0	32,305	4,682	2022
Zunyi	Guizhou	City	440.1	63.8	66,742	9,674	2022
Tongren	Guizhou	City	147.7	21.4	45,126	6,541	2022
Liupanshui	Guizhou	City	150.4	21.8	49,839	7,224	2022
Anshun	Guizhou	City	108.1	15.7	43,991	6,376	2022
Guiyang*	Guizhou	City	492.1	71.3	79,872	11,578	2022
Qianxinan	Guizhou	Autonomous prefecture (Buyei & Miao)	150.9	21.9	50,395	7,305	2022
Qiannan	Guizhou	Autonomous prefecture (Buyei & Miao)	177.2	25.7	50,971	7,388	2022
Qiandongnan	Guizhou	Autonomous prefecture (Miao & Dong)	129.3	18.7	34,613	5,017	2022
Danzhou	Hainan	City	83.2	12.9	85,755	13,292	2021
Haikou*	Hainan	City	205.7	31.9	70,738	10,965	2021
Sanya	Hainan	City	83.5	12.9	79,100	12,261	2021
Shijiazhuang*	Hebei	City	710.1	102.9	63,319	9,179	2022
Baoding	Hebei	City	460.8	66.8	40,038	5,804	2022
Cangzhou	Hebei	City	438.8	63.6	60,035	8,702	2022
Chengde	Hebei	City	178.0	25.8	53,482	7,753	2022
Handan	Hebei	City	434.6	63.0	46,615	6,757	2022
Hengshui	Hebei	City	180.1	26.1	43,108	6,249	2022
Langfang	Hebei	City	356.5	51.7	64,626	9,368	2022
Qinhuangdao	Hebei	City	191.0	27.7	61,277	8,883	2022
Tangshan	Hebei	City	890.1	129.0	115,571	16,753	2022
Xingtai	Hebei	City	254.7	36.9	36,091	5,232	2022
Zhangjiakou	Hebei	City	177.5	25.7	43,435	6,296	2022
**Harbin***	Heilongjiang	City	549.0	79.6	55,711	8,076	2022
Daqing	Heilongjiang	City	298.9	43.3	109,200	15,829	2022
Hegang	Heilongjiang	City	40.9	5.9	47,328	6,861	2022
Heihe	Heilongjiang	City	66.0	9.6	52,576	7,621	2022
Jiamusi	Heilongjiang	City	86.9	12.6	41,183	5,970	2022
Jixi	Heilongjiang	City	66.5	9.6	45,620	6,613	2022
Mudanjiang	Heilongjiang	City	92.6	13.4	41,489	6,014	2022
Qiqihar	Heilongjiang	City	131.8	19.1	33,301	4,827	2022
Qitaihe	Heilongjiang	City	26.9	3.9	40,086	5,811	2022
Shuangyashan	Heilongjiang	City	55.7	8.1	47,378	6,868	2022
Suihua	Heilongjiang	City	123.8	17.9	33,953	4,922	2022
Yichun, Heilongjiang	Heilongjiang	City	34.3	5.0	40,657	5,894	2022
Daxing'anling	Heilongjiang	Prefecture	16.8	2.4	53,364	7,735	2022
Zhengzhou*	Henan	City	1,293.5	187.5	101,169	14,665	2022
Anyang	Henan	City	251.2	36.4	46,350	6,719	2022
Hebi	Henan	City	110.7	16.0	70,422	10,208	2022
Jiaozuo	Henan	City	223.5	32.4	63,434	9,195	2022
Kaifeng	Henan	City	265.7	38.5	56,075	8,128	2022
Luohe	Henan	City	181.3	26.3	76,493	11,088	2022
Luoyang	Henan	City	567.5	82.3	80,226	11,629	2022
Nanyang	Henan	City	455.5	66.0	47,344	6,863	2022
Pingdingshan	Henan	City	283.9	41.2	57,193	8,291	2022
Puyang	Henan	City	189.0	27.4	50,475	7,317	2022
Sanmenxia	Henan	City	167.6	24.3	82,276	11,926	2022
Shangqiu	Henan	City	326.3	47.3	42,227	6,121	2022
Xinxiang	Henan	City	216.7	32.6	37,805	5,692	2022
Xinyang	Henan	City	346.4	50.2	56,156	8,140	2022
Xuchang	Henan	City	374.7	54.3	85,515	12,396	2022
Zhoukou	Henan	City	361.7	52.4	40,951	5,936	2022
Zhumadian	Henan	City	325.7	47.2	47,136	6,833	2022
**Wuhan***	Hubei	City	1,886.6	273.5	137,320	19,906	2022
Ezhou	Hubei	City	126.5	18.3	118,050	17,112	2022
Huanggang	Hubei	City	274.8	39.8	47,458	6,879	2022
Huangshi	Hubei	City	204.2	29.6	83,532	12,108	2022
Jingmen	Hubei	City	220.1	31.9	86,390	12,523	2022
Jingzhou	Hubei	City	300.9	43.6	58,589	8,493	2022
Shiyan	Hubei	City	230.5	33.4	72,790	10,551	2022
Suizhou	Hubei	City	132.9	19.3	65,987	9,565	2022
Xiangyang	Hubei	City	582.8	84.5	110,459	16,012	2022
Xianning	Hubei	City	187.6	27.2	71,677	10,390	2022
Xiaogan	Hubei	City	277.7	40.3	66,343	9,617	2022
Yichang	Hubei	City	550.3	79.8	140,375	20,348	2022
Enshi	Hubei	Autonomous prefecture (Tujia & Miao)	140.2	20.3	41,212	5,974	2022
Changsha*	Hunan	City	1,396.6	207.1	133,954	19,919	2022
Changde	Hunan	City	427.5	63.4	80,970	12,040	2022
Chenzhou	Hunan	City	298.1	5.2	64,279	9,558	2022
Hengyang	Hunan	City	409.0	60.7	55,737	8,288	2022
Huaihua	Hunan	City	187.8	27.8	35,865	5,333	2022
Loudi	Hunan	City	193.0	28.6	43,195	6,423	2022
Shaoyang	Hunan	City	259.9	38.6	31,818	4,731	2022
Xiangtan	Hunan	City	269.8	40.0	98,947	14,713	2022
Yiyang	Hunan	City	210.8	31.3	55,567	8,263	2022
Yongzhou	Hunan	City	241.0	35.7	46,853	6,967	2022
Yueyang	Hunan	City	471.1	69.9	93,895	13,962	2022
Zhangjiajie	Hunan	City	59.2	8.8	39,388	5,857	2022
Zhuzhou	Hunan	City	361.7	53.6	93,430	13,893	2022
Xiangxi	Hunan	Autonomous Prefecture (Tujia & Miao)	81.8	12.1	28,170	4,189	2022
Alxa	Inner Mongolia	League	40.7	5.9	150,848	21,866	2022
Bayannur	Inner Mongolia	City	108.5	15.7	71,118	10,309	2022
Wuhai	Inner Mongolia	City	80.3	11.6	143,450	20,794	2022
Ordos	Inner Mongolia	City	561.3	81.4	256,908	37,241	2022
Baotou	Inner Mongolia	City	375.0	54.4	137,360	19,911	2022
Hohhot	Inner Mongolia	City	332.9	48.3	94,443	13,690	2022
Ulanqab	Inner Mongolia	City	101.8	14.8	61,876	8,969	2022
Xilingol	Inner Mongolia	League	114.9	16.7	102,558	14,866	2022
Chifeng	Inner Mongolia	City	214.8	31.1	53,577	7,766	2022
Tongliao	Inner Mongolia	City	156.2	22.6	54,992	7,971	2022
Hinggan	Inner Mongolia	League	68.2	9.9	48,507	7,031	2022
Hulunbuir	Inner Mongolia	City	153.6	22.3	69,819	10,121	2022
**Nanjing***	Jiangsu	City	1,690.8	245.1	178,781	25,916	2022
Changzhou	Jiangsu	City	955.0	138.4	178,243	25,838	2022
Huai'an	Jiangsu	City	474.2	68.7	104,054	15,083	2022
Lianyungang	Jiangsu	City	400.5	58.1	87,042	12,617	2022
Nantong	Jiangsu	City	1,138.0	165.0	147,057	21,317	2022
Suqian	Jiangsu	City	411.2	59.6	82,452	11,952	2022
Suzhou, Jiangsu	Jiangsu	City	2,395.8	347.3	186,024	26,965	2022
Taizhou, Jiangsu	Jiangsu	City	640.2	92.8	141,830	20,559	2022
Wuxi	Jiangsu	City	1,485.1	215.3	198,404	28,760	2022
Xuzhou	Jiangsu	City	845.8	122.6	93,731	13,587	2022
Yancheng	Jiangsu	City	708.0	102.6	105,647	15,314	2022
Yangzhou	Jiangsu	City	710.5	103.0	155,132	22,487	2022
Zhenjiang	Jiangsu	City	501.7	72.7	155,823	22,588	2022
Nanchang*	Jiangxi	City	720.4	104.4	111,031	16,095	2022
Fuzhou, Jiangxi	Jiangxi	City	194.6	28.2	54,360	7,880	2022
Ganzhou	Jiangxi	City	452.4	65.6	50,352	7,299	2022
Ji'an	Jiangxi	City	275.0	39.9	62,170	9,012	2022
Jingdezhen	Jiangxi	City	119.2	17.3	73,537	10,660	2022
Jiujiang	Jiangxi	City	402.7	58.4	88,318	12,802	2022
Pingxiang	Jiangxi	City	116.0	16.8	64,201	9,306	2022
Shangrao	Jiangxi	City	331.0	48.0	51,425	7,454	2022
Xinyu	Jiangxi	City	125.2	18.2	104,130	15,094	2022
Yichun, Jiangxi	Jiangxi	City	347.3	50.3	69,876	10,129	2022
Yingtan	Jiangxi	City	123.8	17.9	107,111	15,526	2022
**Changchun***	Jilin	City	674.5	97.8	74,310	10,772	2022
Baicheng	Jilin	City	57.5	8.3	38,470	5,576	2022
Baishan	Jilin	City	54.2	7.9	59,228	8,586	2022
Jilin	Jilin	City	151.8	22	42,947	6,225	2022
Liaoyuan	Jilin	City	50.1	7.3	51,714	7,496	2022
Siping	Jilin	City	58.2	8.4	33,549	4,863	2022
Songyuan	Jilin	City	87.3	12.7	40,075	5,809	2022
Tonghua	Jilin	City	59.1	8.6	47,405	6,872	2022
Yanbian	Jilin	Autonomous Prefecture (Korean)	83.9	12.2	44,007	6,379	2022
**Shenyang***	Liaoning	City	812.2	114.1	87,734	14,086	2023
**Dalian**	Liaoning	City	875.3	123.0	110,681	17,770	2023
Anshan	Liaoning	City	201.2	28.3	64,710	10,389	2023
Benxi	Liaoning	City	97.1	13.6	67,656	10,862	2023
Chaoyang	Liaoning	City	104.4	14.7	28,852	4,632	2023
Dandong	Liaoning	City	94.5	13.3	40,791	6,549	2023
Fushun	Liaoning	City	94.9	13.3	58,555	9,401	2023
Fuxin	Liaoning	City	60.2	8.5	29,491	4,735	2023
Huludao	Liaoning	City	91.2	12.8	28,071	4,507	2023
Jinzhou	Liaoning	City	125.3	17.6	43,207	6,937	2023
Liaoyang	Liaoning	City	87.8	12.3	55,659	8,936	2023
Panjin	Liaoning	City	138.2	19.4	87,351	14,025	2023
Tieling	Liaoning	City	76.4	10.7	27,885	4,477	2023
Yingkou	Liaoning	City	147.9	20.8	61,925	9,942	2023
Yinchuan*	Ningxia	City	253.6	36.8	87,756	12,721	2022
Shizuishan	Ningxia	City	69.3	10.1	92,151	13,358	2022
Wuzhong	Ningxia	City	86.7	12.6	62,126	9,006	2022
Zhongwei	Ningxia	City	56.4	8.2	52,323	7,585	2022
Guyuan	Ningxia	City	41.0	5.9	35,624	5,164	2022
Haixi	Qinghai	Autonomous prefecture (Mongol & Tibetan)	84.3	12.2	179,949	26,085	2022
Haibei	Qinghai	Autonomous prefecture (Tibetan)	10.1	1.5	37,980	5,505	2022
Xining*	Qinghai	City	164.4	23.8	66,628	9,658	2022
Haidong	Qinghai	City	56.3	8.2	41,428	6,005	2022
Hainan	Qinghai	Autonomous prefecture (Tibetan)	20.0	2.9	44,804	6,495	2022
Huangnan	Qinghai	Autonomous prefecture (Tibetan)	11.1	1.6	40,146	5,819	2022
Yushu	Qinghai	Autonomous prefecture (Tibetan)	7.2	1.0	16,997	2,464	2022
Golog	Qinghai	Autonomous prefecture (Tibetan)	5.4	0.8	24,873	3,606	2022
**Xi'an***	Shaanxi	City	1,148.7	166.5	88,806	12,873	2022
Ankang	Shaanxi	City	126.9	18.4	51,261	7,431	2022
Baoji	Shaanxi	City	274.3	39.8	83,801	12,148	2022
Hanzhong	Shaanxi	City	190.5	27.6	59,832	8,673	2022
Shangluo	Shaanxi	City	90.3	13.1	44,599	6,465	2022
Tongchuan	Shaanxi	City	50.6	7.3	71,709	10,395	2022
Weinan	Shaanxi	City	220.1	31.9	47,592	6,899	2022
Xianyang	Shaanxi	City	281.8	40.8	67,229	9,745	2022
Yan'an	Shaanxi	City	223.2	32.4	98,390	14,262	2022
Yulin, Shaanxi	Shaanxi	City	654.4	94.9	180,816	26,211	2022
**Jinan***	Shandong	City	1,202.7	174.3	128,287	18,596	2022
**Qingdao**	Shandong	City	1,492.1	216.3	144,870	21,000	2022
Binzhou	Shandong	City	297.5	43.1	75,813	10,990	2022
Dezhou	Shandong	City	363.3	52.7	65,022	9,425	2022
Dongying	Shandong	City	362.1	52.5	164,430	23,835	2022
Heze	Shandong	City	420.5	61.0	48,294	7,001	2022
Jining	Shandong	City	531.7	77.1	63,954	9,271	2022
Liaocheng	Shandong	City	278.0	40.3	46,995	6,812	2022
Linyi	Shandong	City	577.9	83.8	52,502	7,611	2022
Rizhao	Shandong	City	230.7	33.4	77,669	11,259	2022
Tai'an	Shandong	City	319.8	46.4	59,029	8,557	2022
Weifang	Shandong	City	730.6	105.9	77,655	11,257	2022
Weihai	Shandong	City	340.8	49.4	116,871	16,941	2022
Yantai	Shandong	City	951.6	137.9	134,581	19,508	2022
Zaozhuang	Shandong	City	203.9	29.6	53,081	7,694	2022
Zibo	Shandong	City	440.3	63.8	93,526	13,557	2022
Taiyuan*	Shanxi	City	557.1	82.2	102,505	15,119	2022
Changzhi	Shanxi	City	280.5	41.4	89,268	13,167	2022
Datong	Shanxi	City	184.3	27.2	59,397	8,761	2022
Jincheng	Shanxi	City	230.5	34.0	105,303	15,532	2022
Jinzhong	Shanxi	City	211.2	31.2	62,227	9,178	2022
Linfen	Shanxi	City	222.8	32.9	57,029	8,412	2022
Lüliang	Shanxi	City	241.9	35.7	62,168	9,170	2022
Shuozhou	Shanxi	City	153.6	22.7	96,574	14,245	2022
Xinzhou	Shanxi	City	150.1	22.1	56,510	8,335	2022
Yangquan	Shanxi	City	101.3	14.9	77,262	11,396	2022
Yuncheng	Shanxi	City	230.1	33.9	48,770	7,194	2022
Garzê	Sichuan	Autonomous prefecture (Tibetan)	47.2	6.8	42,710	6,191	2022
Ngawa	Sichuan	Autonomous prefecture (Tibetan & Qiang)	46.3	6.7	56,473	8,186	2022
Mianyang	Sichuan	City	362.7	52.6	74,171	10,752	2022
Guangyuan	Sichuan	City	114.0	16.5	50,056	7,256	2022
Nanchong	Sichuan	City	268.5	38.9	48,343	7,008	2022
Bazhong	Sichuan	City	76.5	11.1	28,641	4,152	2022
Dazhou	Sichuan	City	250.3	36.3	46,588	6,753	2022
Ya'an	Sichuan	City	90.3	13.1	62,981	9,130	2022
**Chengdu***	Sichuan	City	2,081.8	301.8	98,149	14,227	2022
Deyang	Sichuan	City	281.7	40.8	81,412	11,801	2022
Suining	Sichuan	City	161.4	23.4	58,137	8,427	2022
Guang'an	Sichuan	City	142.5	20.7	43,901	6,364	2022
Meishan	Sichuan	City	163.6	23.7	55,273	8,012	2022
Ziyang	Sichuan	City	94.8	13.7	41,586	6,028	2022
Leshan	Sichuan	City	230.9	33.5	73,226	10,615	2022
Neijiang	Sichuan	City	165.7	24.0	53,485	7,753	2022
Zigong	Sichuan	City	163.8	23.8	66,602	9,654	2022
Yibin	Sichuan	City	342.8	49.7	74,341	10,776	2022
Luzhou	Sichuan	City	260.2	37.7	61,054	8,850	2022
Liangshan	Sichuan	Autonomous prefecture (Yi)	208.1	30.2	42,625	6,179	2022
Panzhihua	Sichuan	City	122.1	17.7	100,454	14,562	2022
Ngari	Tibet	Prefecture	8.1	1.2	62,773	9,099	2021
Nagqu	Tibet	City	19.3	2.8	34,205	4,958	2022
Qamdo	Tibet	City	33.4	4.8	43,948	6,371	2023
Xigazê	Tibet	City	36.2	5.2	45,320	6,569	2022
Lhasa*	Tibet	City	74.8	10.8	86,091	12,479	2022
Lhoka	Tibet	City	24.8	3.6	68,609	9,945	2022
Nyingchi	Tibet	City	20.8	3.0	87,132	12,630	2022
Altay	Xinjiang	Prefecture	40.0	5.8	59,739	8,659	2022
Bortala	Xinjiang	Autonomous prefecture (Mongol)	44.8	6.5	91,519	13,266	2021
Tarbaĝatay	Xinjiang	Prefecture	87.7	12.7	79,453	11,517	2022
Karamay	Xinjiang	City	80.2	11.6	229,372	33,249	2022
Changji	Xinjiang	Autonomous prefecture (Hui)	233.0	33.8	134,166	19,448	2023
Ürümqi*	Xinjiang	City	416.9	60.4	102,078	14,796	2023
Turpan	Xinjiang	City	52.7	7.6	75,671	10,969	2022
Hami	Xinjiang	City	86.9	12.6	134,424	19,485	2022
**Ili**	Xinjiang	Autonomous prefecture (Kazakh)	119.1	17.3	42,768	6,200	2019
Kizilsu	Xinjiang	Autonomous prefecture (Kirgiz)	21.7	3.1	34,756	5,038	2022
Kashgar	Xinjiang	Prefecture	136.9	19.8	28,714	4,162	2022
Aksu	Xinjiang	Prefecture	136.9	19.8	28,714	4,162	2022
Hotan	Xinjiang	Prefecture	52.6	7.6	20,863	3,024	2023
Bayingolin	Xinjiang	Autonomous prefecture (Mongol)	160.1	23.2	106,761	15,475	2023
Kunming*	Yunnan	City	754.1	111.2	88,193	13,008	2022
Qujing	Yunnan	City	380.0	56.1	66,373	9,790	2022
Yuxi	Yunnan	City	252.1	37.2	111,579	16,547	2022
Baoshan	Yunnan	City	126.2	18.6	52,438	7,734	2022
Zhaotong	Yunnan	City	154.1	22.7	30,935	4,563	2022
Lijiang	Yunnan	City	62.0	9.1	49,768	7,340	2022
Pu'er	Yunnan	City	107.3	15.8	45,168	6,662	2022
Lincang	Yunnan	City	100.0	14.8	44,723	6,596	2022
Dehong	Yunnan	Autonomous prefecture (Dai & Jingpo)	58.7	8.7	44,530	6,568	2022
Nujiang	Yunnan	Autonomous prefecture (Lisu)	25.0	3.7	45,441	6,702	2022
Dêqên	Yunnan	Autonomous prefecture (Tibetan)	30.3	4.5	77,785	11,473	2022
Dali	Yunnan	Autonomous prefecture (Bai)	170.0	25.1	51,302	7,567	2022
Chuxiong	Yunnan	Autonomous prefecture (Yi)	176.3	26.0	74,046	10,921	2022
Honghe	Yunnan	Autonomous prefecture (Hani & Yi)	286.3	42.2	64,768	9,553	2022
Wenshan	Yunnan	Autonomous prefecture (Zhuang & Miao)	140.5	20.7	40,748	6,010	2022
Xishuangbanna	Yunnan	Autonomous prefecture (Dai)	72.1	10.6	55,194	8,141	2022
**Hangzhou***	Zhejiang	City	1,875.3	271.8	152,588	22,119	2022
**Ningbo**	Zhejiang	City	1,570.4	227.6	163,911	23,760	2022
Huzhou	Zhejiang	City	385.0	55.8	112,902	16,366	2022
Jiaxing	Zhejiang	City	673.9	97.7	121,794	17,655	2022
Jinhua	Zhejiang	City	556.2	80.6	78,086	11,319	2022
Lishui	Zhejiang	City	183.1	26.5	72,812	10,555	2022
Quzhou	Zhejiang	City	200.3	29.0	87,544	12,690	2022
Shaoxing	Zhejiang	City	735.1	106.6	137,522	19,935	2022
Taizhou, Zhejiang	Zhejiang	City	604.1	87.6	90,572	13,129	2022
Wenzhou	Zhejiang	City	803.0	116.4	83,107	12,047	2022
Zhoushan	Zhejiang	City	195.1	28.3	167,134	24,227	2022

== See also ==
- Economy of China
- Historical GDP of China
- List of Chinese provincial-level divisions by GDP
- List of Chinese provincial-level divisions by GDP per capita
- List of top Chinese counties by GDP
- List of top Chinese cities by GDP
- List of top Chinese cities by GDP per capita
- Prefecture-level city
- List of first-level administrative divisions by GDP
- List of renminbi exchange rates
- Provincial city
- Administrative divisions of China
