= Tiegai Township, Qinghai =

Tiegai Township 铁盖乡
- Township
- Tiegaixiang
- Location in Qinghai
- Coordinates: 35°59′47″N 100°12′36″E
- Country: People's Republic of China
- Province: Qinghai
- Autonomous prefecture: Hainan Tibetan Autonomous Prefecture
- County: Gonghe County

Area
  - Total: 1,028 km^{2} (397 sq mi)

Population (2010)
  - Total: 4,907
  - Density: 4.773/km^{2} (12.36/sq mi)
- Time zone: UTC+8 (China Standard)
- Local dialing code: 974

Tiegai Township (Chinese: 铁盖乡) is a township in Gonghe County, Hainan Tibetan Autonomous Prefecture, Qinghai, China. In 2010, Tiegai Township had a total population of 4,907: 2,473 males and 2,434 females: 1,137 aged under 14, 3,532 aged between 15 and 65 and 238 aged over 65.
