= Tanggemu =

Tanggemu 塘格木镇
- Town
- Tanggemuzhen
- Location in Qinghai
- Coordinates: 36°4′41″N 100°5′28″E
- Country: People's Republic of China
- Province: Qinghai
- Autonomous prefecture: Hainan Tibetan Autonomous Prefecture
- County: Xinghai County
- Village-level divisions: 17

Population (2021)
  - Total: 10,200
- Time zone: UTC+8 (China Standard)
- Postal code: 813000
- Local dialing code: 974

Tanggemu (Chinese: 塘格木镇) is a town in Xinghai County, Hainan Tibetan Autonomous Prefecture, Qinghai, China. Tanggemu has 17 villages under its township-level jurisdiction:

- Dala Village
- Dongge Village
- Gadang Village
- Gengga Village
- Haergan Village
- Huanghe Village
- Huatang Village
- Jiashenda Village
- Jintang Village
- Langniang Village
- Qurang Village
- Quzong Village
- Tanggemuzhen Village
- Wuhelei Village
- Zhide Village
- Zhihai Village
- Zhongguo Village
