= Longyangxia, Qinghai =

Longyangxia 龙羊峡镇
- Town
- Longyangxiazhen
- Location in Qinghai
- Coordinates: 36°8′12″N 100°54′49″E
- Country: People's Republic of China
- Province: Qinghai
- Autonomous prefecture: Hainan Tibetan Autonomous Prefecture
- County: Gonghe County

Area
  - Total: 752 km^{2} (290 sq mi)

Population (2010)
  - Total: 6,578
  - Density: 8.75/km^{2} (22.7/sq mi)
- Time zone: UTC+8 (China Standard)
- Local dialing code: 974

Longyangxia (Chinese: 龙羊峡镇) is a town in Gonghe County, Hainan Tibetan Autonomous Prefecture, Qinghai, China. In 2010, Longyangxia had a total population of 6,578: 3,461 males and 3,117 females: 1,341 aged under 14, 4,869 aged between 15 and 65 and 368 aged over 65.
