= Prefecture-level city =

City or municipality of a Chinese province

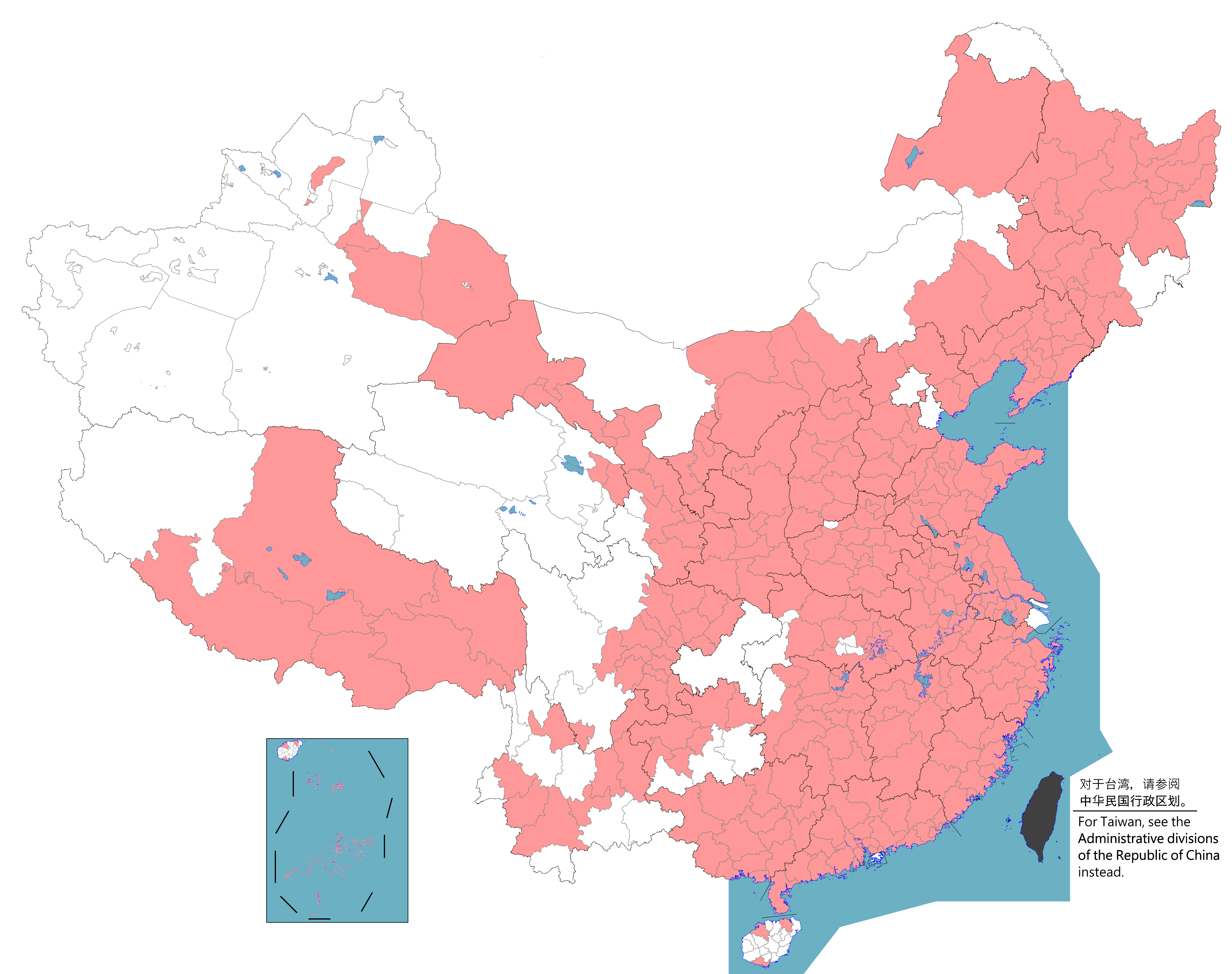

Chinese name
- Simplified Chinese: 地级市
- Traditional Chinese: 地級市
- Literal meaning: Regional-level city
Transcriptions
Standard Mandarin
- Hanyu Pinyin: Dìjíshì
Hakka
- Romanization: thi-kip-sṳ:
Yue: Cantonese
- Jyutping: dei6 kap1 si5

Tibetan name
- Tibetan: ས་ཁུལ་རིམ་པ་གྲོང་ཁྱེར།
Transcriptions
- Wylie: sa khul rim pa drong khyer
- Tibetan Pinyin: Sakü Rimba Chongkyêr

Mongolian name
- Mongolian Cyrillic: Дугаргийн энтэй хот
- Mongolian script: ᠲᠣᠭᠣᠷᠢᠭ ᠤᠨ ᠡᠩ ᠲᠡᠢ ᠬᠣᠲᠠ
Transcriptions
- SASM/GNC: toγoriγ-un en-tai qota

Uyghur name
- Uyghur: ۋىلايەت دەرىجىلىك شەھەر
Transcriptions
- Latin Yëziqi: Wilayet Derijilik Sheher

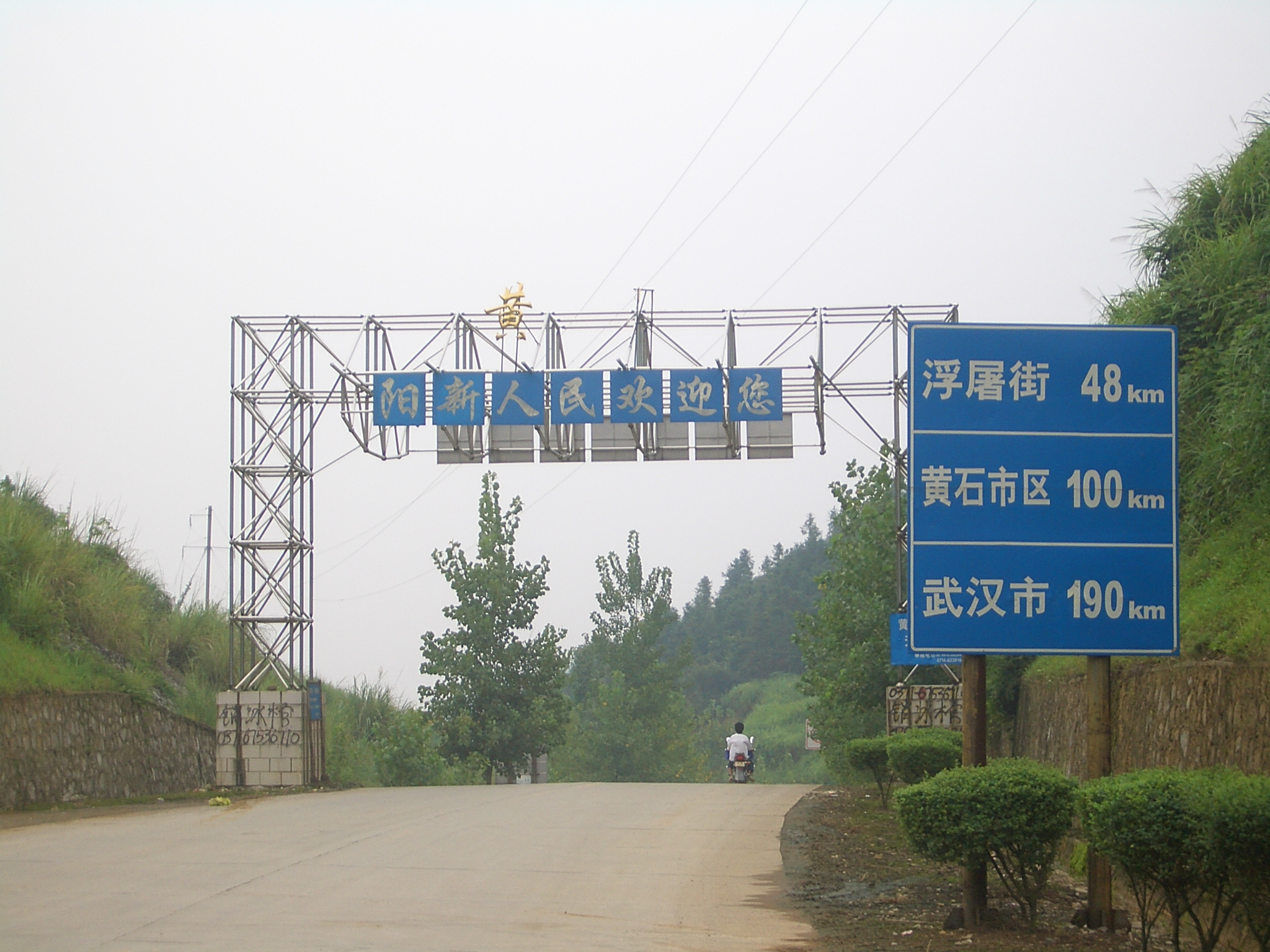
A road sign shows distance to the "Huangshi urban area" (黄石市区) rather than simply "Huangshi" (黄石). This is a useful distinction, because the sign is located already within Huangshi prefectural level city (immediately upon entering its Yangxin County from the neighboring Xianning), but still 100 kilometres (62 mi) from the Huangshi main urban area.

In China, a prefecture-level city (地级市) is an administrative division ranking below a province and above a county. It usually consists of municipal districts, counties, and county-level cities as its subdivisions.

== Details ==
During the Republican era, many of China's prefectural cities were designated as counties as the country's second level division below a province. From 1949 to 1983, the official term was a province-administrated city (Chinese: 省辖市). Prefectural level cities form the second level of the administrative structure (alongside prefectures, leagues and autonomous prefectures). Administrative chiefs (mayors) of prefectural level cities generally have the same rank as a division chief (Chinese: 司长) of a national ministry. Since the 1980s, most former prefectures have been renamed into prefecture-level cities.

A prefectural city is a "city" (Chinese: 市; pinyin: shì) and a "prefecture" (Chinese: 地区; pinyin: dìqū) that have been merged into one consolidated and unified jurisdiction. As such it is simultaneously a city, which is a municipal entry with subordinate districts, and a prefecture, with subordinate county-level cities and counties, as well as an administrative division of a province.

A prefectural city is often not a "city" in the literal sense of the term (i.e., a large continuous urban settlement), but instead an administrative unit comprising, typically, a main central urban area (the core city, city as in the usual sense, usually but not always with the same name as the prefectural level city) surrounded by rural areas or small towns, which together are divided into districts, and some surrounding counties or county-level cities governed by the prefecture-level city on behalf of the province, which all have their own urban areas surrounded by their own rural areas. The urban areas of the surrounding counties are usually smaller than the core urban area, and towns also form small urban areas scattered in the rural. The larger prefectural cities span over 100 kilometres (62 mi).

Prefectural cities nearly always contain multiple counties, county level cities, and other such sub-divisions. This results from the fact that the formerly predominant prefectures, which prefectural cities have mostly replaced, were themselves large administrative units containing cities, smaller towns, and rural areas. To distinguish a prefectural city from its actual urban area (city in the strict sense), the term shìqū (市区; "urban area"), is used.

The first prefectural cities were created on 5 November 1983. Over the following two decades, prefectural cities have come to replace the vast majority of Chinese prefectures; the process is still ongoing.

Most provinces are composed entirely or nearly entirely of prefectural cities. Of the 22 provinces and five autonomous regions of the PRC, only nine provinces (Yunnan, Guizhou, Qinghai, Heilongjiang, Sichuan, Gansu, Jilin, Hubei, and Hunan) and three autonomous regions (Xinjiang, Tibet, and Inner Mongolia) have at least one or more second level or prefectural level divisions that are not prefectural cities.

Criteria that a prefecture must meet to become a prefectural level city:

- An urban centre with a non-rural population over 250,000
- gross output of value of industry of 200,000,000 RMB (US$32 million)
- the output of the tertiary sector supersedes that of the primary sector, contributing over 35% of the GDP

Fifteen large prefectural level cities have been granted the status of sub-provincial city, which gives them much greater autonomy.

Shijiazhuang, Suzhou, and Zhengzhou are the largest prefectural level cities with populations approaching or exceeding some sub-provincial cities.

A sub-prefecture-level city is a county-level city with powers approaching those of prefectural level cities.

== Classification ==
There are a total of three classifications of prefecture-level cities:

- Regular prefectural level city, which consists of counties, county level cities, and districts subdivisions.
- Consolidated district-governed prefectural level city, which only consists of districts as subdivisions.
  - Currently there are only 13 cities under this classification: Ezhou, Foshan, Guangzhou, Haikou, Karamay, Nanjing, Sansha, Sanya, Shenzhen, Wuhai, Wuhan, Xiamen, and Zhuhai
- Prefectural level city with no county-level divisions (direct-piped city), which are cities that do not govern any county-level divisions such as counties, county level cities, or legal administrative districts.
  - Currently there are only four cities under this classification: Danzhou, Dongguan, Jiayuguan, and Zhongshan

== Cartographic expression and statistics ==
In Europe and North America, cities are generally represented as points, while counties are represented as areas. Thus, Bloomington, Indiana, is indicated on the map by a point, which is distinct from, and enclosed by, the area of Monroe County, Indiana. In China, however, large cities such as Xianning may, in reality, contain both urban and rural elements. Moreover, they may enclose counties or other cities. On a less detailed map, Xianning would be indicated by a point, more or less corresponding to the coordinates of its city government. Other populous areas may also be exhibited as points, such as the county of Tongshan, with no indication that Tongshan is, in fact, enclosed by Xianning. On a more detailed map, Xianning would be drawn as an area, similar to a county of the United States, and Tongshan would be drawn as a smaller area within Xianning.

This convention may lead to difficulty in the identification of places mentioned in older sources. For example, Guo Moruo writes that he was born in the town of Shawan, within the prefecture of Leshan, and attended primary school in the town of Jiading. A modern map is unlikely to show either town: Shawan, because it is too small, and Jiading, because it is the seat of Leshan, and is therefore indicated on the map by a point labelled "Leshan." A more detailed map would show Shawan as a district within Leshan, but Jiading would still be missing.

Statistics of China such as population and industrial activity are generally reported along prefectural city lines. Thus, the relatively unknown city of Huangshi has 2.5 million residents, more than most European capitals, but upon closer inspection, the city covers an area almost 100 kilometers across. Furthermore, Huangshi contains several other cities, such as Daye. If a person wished to calculate the population of the urban area of Huangshi, and had a map of Huangshi, and a table of its population by district, the task might not be easy. The urban area might be split between several districts, and some of those districts may include rural elements as well.

== See also ==
- List of prefecture-level cities
- Special administrative regions of China
- Provincial city (Taiwan)
