= Gonghe County =

Gonghe County 共和县 · གསེར་ཆེན་རྫོང་། Kungho
- County
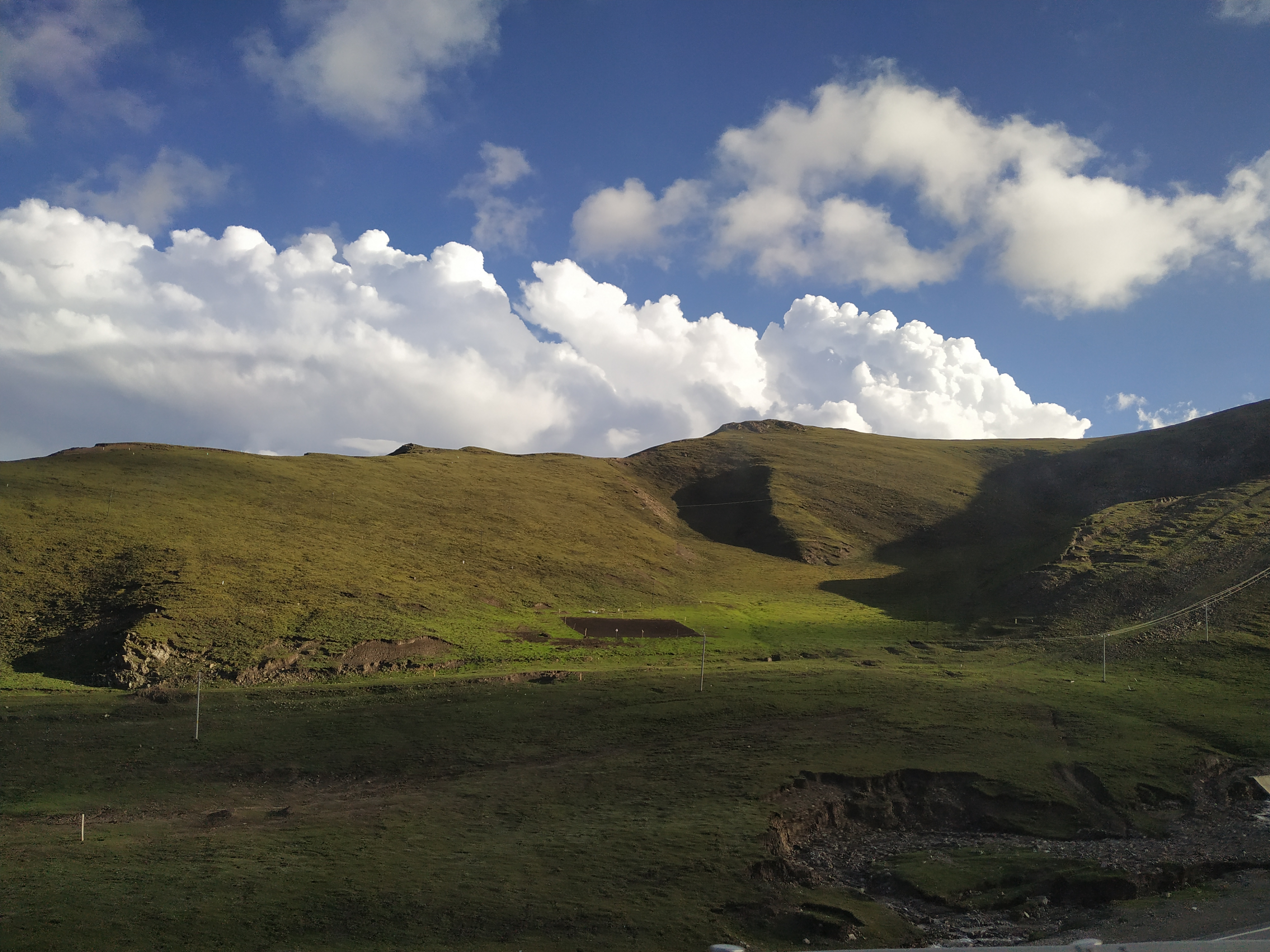

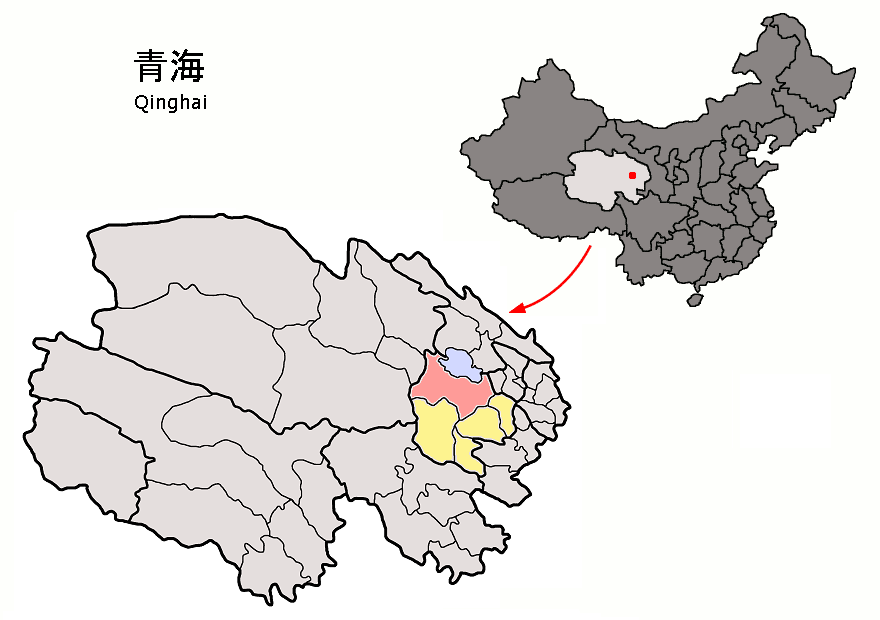
- Gonghe County (light red) within Hainan Prefecture (yellow) and Qinghai

- Location of the seat in Qinghai
- Coordinates (Gonghe County government): 36°17′03″N 100°37′10″E
- Country: China
- Province: Qinghai
- Autonomous prefecture: Hainan
- County seat: Qabqa

Area
  - Total: 16,364 km^{2} (6,318 sq mi)

Population (2020)
  - Total: 133,409
  - Density: 8.1526/km^{2} (21.115/sq mi)
- Time zone: UTC+8 (China Standard)
- Website: www.gonghe.gov.cn

Gonghe County

Chinese name
- Simplified Chinese: 共和县
- Traditional Chinese: 共和縣
Transcriptions
Standard Mandarin
- Hanyu Pinyin: Gònghé Xiàn

Tibetan name
- Tibetan: གསེར་ཆེན་རྫོང་།
Transcriptions
- Wylie: gser chen rdzong
- Tibetan Pinyin: Gêrqên Zong

Gonghe County (Chinese: 共和县; Tibetan: གསེར་ཆེན་རྫོང་།), also known as Kungho, is a county of Qinghai Province, China under the administration of Hainan Prefecture. The seat of Gonghe County is in the town of Qabqa.

== Administrative divisions ==
Gonghe County is made up of 7 towns and 4 townships:

Name	Simplified Chinese	Hanyu Pinyin	Tibetan	Wylie	Administrative division code
Towns
Qabqa Town (Qiabuqia)	恰卜恰镇	Qiàbǔqià Zhèn	ཆབ་ཆ་གྲོང་བརྡལ།	chab cha grong brdal	632521100
Rigmoin Town (Daotanghe)	倒淌河镇	Dàotǎnghé Zhèn	རིག་སྨོན་གྲོང་རྡལ།	rig smon grong rdal	632521101
Cai'ngagag Town (Longyangxia)	龙羊峡镇	Lóngyángxiá Zhèn	ཚལ་རྔ་འགག་གྲོང་རྡལ།	tshal rnga 'gag grong rdal	632521102
Tanggarma Town (Tanggemu)	塘格木镇	Tánggémù Zhèn	ཐང་དཀར་མ་གྲོང་བརྡལ།	thang dkar ma grong brdal	632521103
Danagma Town (Heimahe)	黑马河镇	Hēimǎhé Zhèn	རྟ་ནག་མ་གྲོང་རྡལ།	rta nag ma grong rdal	632521104
Sênag Town (Zhênag, Zhiunag, Shinaihai)	石乃亥镇	Shínǎihài Zhèn	སྤྲེའུ་ནག་གྲོང་རྡལ།	spre'u nag grong rdal	632521105
Jangxê Town (Jangsi, Jiangxigou, Jings)	江西沟镇	Jiāngxīgōu Zhèn	ཅང་ཤེས་གྲོང་རྡལ།	cang shes grong rdal	632521106
Townships
Sazhubxi Township	沙珠玉乡	Shāzhūyù Xiāng	ས་གྲུ་བཞི་ཞང་།	sa gru bzhi zhang	632521202
Têgê Township (Tiegai, Deegee)	铁盖乡	Tiěgài Xiāng	ཐེ་གེ་ཞང་།	the ge zhang	632521203
Êrdi Township (Niandi, Irt)	廿地乡	Niàndì Xiāng	ཨེར་སྟི་ཞང་།	er sti zhang	632521204
Qoijê Township (Qieji)	切吉乡	Qièjí Xiāng	ཆོས་རྗེ་ཞང་།	chos rje zhang	632521205

Others:

- Hainan Prefecture Green Industry Development Park Management Zone Committee (海南州绿色产业发展园区管理区委员会)
- Tanggarma Farm (巴卡台农场)
- Anzhi Farm (安置农场)
- Tiebujia Grassland Improvement Station (铁卜加草改站)

== Demographics ==
In 2006, 55% of the population were Tibetans, with Han, Hui, Mongolian and Salar minorities.

== Economy ==
Gonghe is rich in grassland, used for animal husbandry. Crops such as wheat, barley, peas, potatoes, beans, oilseed and oats are also grown.

== Geography ==
The county is located along Qinghai Lake. Local grasslands have been at risk of desertification, combated by newly planted grassland and forests.

== Climate ==
Climate data for Gonghe County, elevation 2,835 m (9,301 ft), (1991–2020 normals, extremes 1981–2010)
Month	Jan	Feb	Mar	Apr	May	Jun	Jul	Aug	Sep	Oct	Nov	Dec	Year
Record high °C (°F)	11.8 (53.2)	16.3 (61.3)	23.2 (73.8)	29.8 (85.6)	27.9 (82.2)	28.4 (83.1)	33.7 (92.7)	32.2 (90.0)	29.4 (84.9)	21.5 (70.7)	15.4 (59.7)	10.2 (50.4)	33.7 (92.7)
Mean daily maximum °C (°F)	0.1 (32.2)	4.3 (39.7)	9.3 (48.7)	14.7 (58.5)	17.9 (64.2)	20.7 (69.3)	22.8 (73.0)	22.5 (72.5)	18.2 (64.8)	12.9 (55.2)	6.9 (44.4)	1.5 (34.7)	12.7 (54.8)
Daily mean °C (°F)	−8.4 (16.9)	−4.2 (24.4)	1.3 (34.3)	7.0 (44.6)	11.0 (51.8)	14.3 (57.7)	16.4 (61.5)	15.7 (60.3)	11.4 (52.5)	5.2 (41.4)	−1.9 (28.6)	−7.3 (18.9)	5.0 (41.1)
Mean daily minimum °C (°F)	−14.9 (5.2)	−10.9 (12.4)	−5.3 (22.5)	0.3 (32.5)	4.7 (40.5)	8.5 (47.3)	10.7 (51.3)	10.2 (50.4)	6.3 (43.3)	−0.7 (30.7)	−8.2 (17.2)	−13.6 (7.5)	−1.1 (30.1)
Record low °C (°F)	−25.9 (−14.6)	−23.4 (−10.1)	−18.9 (−2.0)	−12.6 (9.3)	−5.4 (22.3)	−0.7 (30.7)	3.1 (37.6)	1.2 (34.2)	−3.4 (25.9)	−13.0 (8.6)	−23.8 (−10.8)	−24.8 (−12.6)	−25.9 (−14.6)
Average precipitation mm (inches)	1.7 (0.07)	1.8 (0.07)	5.6 (0.22)	15.0 (0.59)	41.2 (1.62)	57.5 (2.26)	76.8 (3.02)	71.3 (2.81)	48.2 (1.90)	12.8 (0.50)	2.3 (0.09)	1.0 (0.04)	335.2 (13.19)
Average precipitation days (≥ 0.1 mm)	2.4	1.8	3.3	5.0	11.0	14.4	15.5	14.5	13.0	5.3	1.4	1.2	88.8
Average snowy days	3.8	3.3	4.5	4.1	1.3	0	0	0	0.1	2.2	1.9	2.3	23.5
Average relative humidity (%)	43	37	35	38	47	55	60	61	64	55	44	43	49
Mean monthly sunshine hours	229.9	224.4	255.4	261.3	259.4	236.4	246.1	250.2	216.8	243.7	240.8	234.8	2,899.2
Percentage possible sunshine	74	72	68	66	59	54	56	61	59	71	79	78	66
Source: China Meteorological Administration

== See also ==
- List of administrative divisions of Qinghai
- 1990 Gonghe earthquake
- Longyangxia Dam
