= Qabqa =

Qabqa 恰卜恰镇 · ཆབ་ཆ་གྲོང་རྡལ། Chabcha
- Town
- Location of the city centre in Qinghai
- Coordinates: 36°16′N 100°37′E
- Country: China
- Province: Qinghai
- Autonomous prefecture: Hainan
- County: Gonghe

Area
  - Total: 7.3 km^{2} (2.8 sq mi)
- Elevation: 2,835 m (9,301 ft)

Population (2010)
  - Total: 46,907
  - Density: 6,400/km^{2} (17,000/sq mi)
- Time zone: UTC+8 (China Standard)

Qabqa or Chabcha (Tibetan: ཆབ་ཆ་གྲོང་རྡལ།; Chinese: 恰卜恰; pinyin: Qiàbǔqià) is a town in Gonghe County, Qinghai, China. It is the seat of the Hainan Tibetan Autonomous Prefecture and the seat of Gonghe County. Qabqa has an altitude of 2835 m. The average annual temperature is 3.4 °C (38.1 °F), and the average annual precipitation is 321.4 mm (12.65 in).

Qabqa had a population of 46,907 as of 2010. Qabqa is the political, economical, and cultural center of the Hainan Prefecture. China National Highway 214 passes through Qabqa.
