= Hainan Tibetan Autonomous Prefecture =

Coordinates: 36.29°N 100.62°E

Hainan Prefecture 海南州 · མཚོ་ལྷོ་ཁུལ།
- Autonomous prefecture
- 海南藏族自治州 · མཚོ་ལྷོ་བོད་རིགས་རང་སྐྱོང་ཁུལ
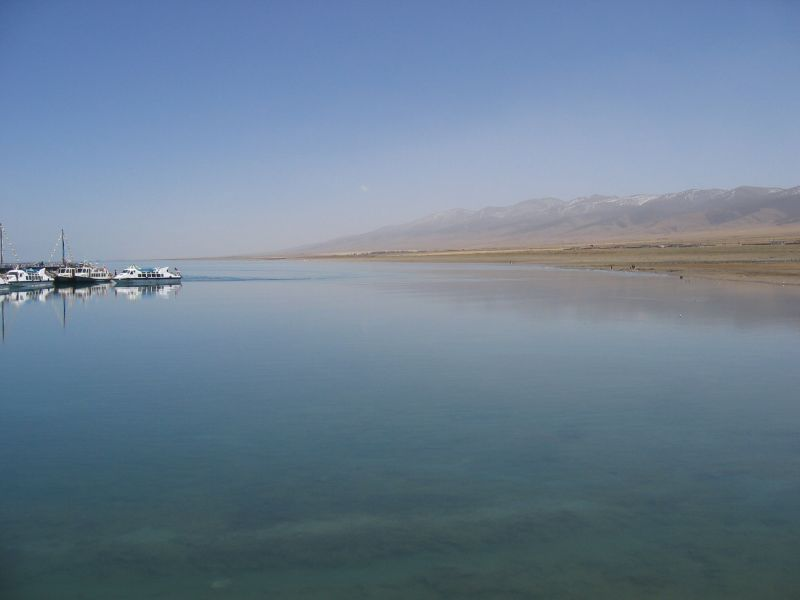
- Qinghai Lake

- Location of Hainan Prefecture in Qinghai
- Country: People's Republic of China
- Province: Qinghai
- Named after: South of Qinghai Lake
- Prefecture seat: Gonghe County (Qabqa)

Area
  - Autonomous prefecture: 44,546.21 km^{2} (17,199.39 sq mi)
  - Water: 2,981.55 km^{2} (1,151.18 sq mi)
- Highest elevation: 5,305 m (17,405 ft)
- Lowest elevation: 2,168 m (7,113 ft)

Population (2020)
  - Autonomous prefecture: 446,996
  - Density: 10.0344/km^{2} (25.9891/sq mi)
  - Rural: 267,100

GDP
  - Autonomous prefecture: CN¥ 14.0 billion US$ 2.3 billion
  - Per capita: CN¥ 30,379; US$ 4,878
- Time zone: UTC+8 (China Standard)
- ISO 3166 code: CN-QH-25
- Website: www.hainanzhou.gov.cn

Hainan Tibetan Autonomous Prefecture

Chinese name
- Chinese: 海南藏族自治州
Transcriptions
Standard Mandarin
- Hanyu Pinyin: Hǎinán Zàngzú Zìzhìzhōu

Tibetan name
- Tibetan: མཚོ་ལྷོ་བོད་རིགས་རང་སྐྱོང་ཁུལ
Transcriptions
- Wylie: mtsho-lho bod-rigs rang-skyong-khul
- Tibetan Pinyin: Colho Poirig Ranggyong Kü

Hainan Tibetan Autonomous Prefecture, formerly known as Tsolho Tibetan Autonomous Prefecture (Chinese: 海南藏族自治州; Tibetan: མཚོ་ལྷོ་བོད་རིགས་རང་སྐྱོང་ཁུལ་), is an autonomous prefecture of Northeastern Qinghai Province in Western China. The prefecture has an area of 45,895 square kilometres (17,720 sq mi) and its seat is located in Gonghe County. Its name literally means "south of (Qinghai) Lake."

== History ==
The land of Hainan prefecture was originally inhabited by the Qiang and Rong people. During the Western Han it was incorporated in the Chinese dynasties. In 60 BC, Guide County was established, then called Guan County. It was governed under Jincheng (present day Lanzhou).

== Demographics ==
In 2019, the prefecture had 478,000 inhabitants, with 331,995 belonging to ethnic minorities. The following is a list of ethnic groups in the prefecture, as of 2019.

Ethnicity	Population	Percentage
Tibetan	326,600	68.3%
Han	129,000	21.5%
Hui	37,100	7.8%
Tu	5,700	1.2%
Mongol	3,700	0.8%
Salar	1,300	0.3%

== Administrative divisions ==
Hainan Prefecture was established in 1953. The prefecture is subdivided into 5 county-level divisions (5 counties):

Map
Name	Hanzi	Hanyu Pinyin	Tibetan	Wylie Tibetan Pinyin	Population (2010 Census)	Area (km^{2})	Density (/km^{2})
Gonghe County	共和县	Gònghé Xiàn	གསེར་ཆེན་རྫོང་	gser chen rdzong Gêrqên Zong	122,966	16,050	7.66
Tongde County	同德县	Tóngdé Xiàn	འབའ་རྫོང་	'ba' rdzong Pa Zong	64,369	6,494	9.91
Guide County	贵德县	Guìdé Xiàn	ཁྲི་ཀ་རྫོང་	thri ka rdzong Triga Zong	101,771	3,600	28.26
Xinghai County	兴海县	Xīnghǎi Xiàn	བྲག་དཀར་རྫོང་	brag dkar rdzong Zhag'gar Zong	76,025	13,158	5.77
Guinan County	贵南县	Guìnán Xiàn	མང་རྫོང་	mang rdzong Mang Zong	76,560	6,593	11.61

== Geography ==
Hainan is rather mountainous, with the Gonghe basin in the middle of the area. The elevation ranges from 5305 m to 2168 m, averaging 3000 m. The largest lake is Qinghai Lake, and the prefecture is traversed by the Yellow River.

Most of the land, 78.67%, is natural grassland used for grazing. 2.19% is cultivated for agriculture, 4.14% is forest, 6.69% is covered by water and rivers, 0.53% by residential area and industry and the remaining 7.7% consists of barren areas such as glaciers, swamps and desert.

== Economy ==
Hainan's economy is specialized in animal husbandry, hydropower and tourism.

== See also ==
- Longyangxia Dam
