= Economy of Beijing =

The economy of Beijing ranks among the most developed and prosperous cities in China. In 2013, the municipality's nominal gross domestic product (GDP) was CN¥1.95 trillion (US$314 billion). It was about 3.43% of the country's total output, and ranked 13th among province-level administrative units. Per capita GDP, at CN¥93,213 (US$15,051) in nominal terms and Int $21,948 at purchasing power parity, was 2.2 times the national average and ranked second among province-level administrative units.

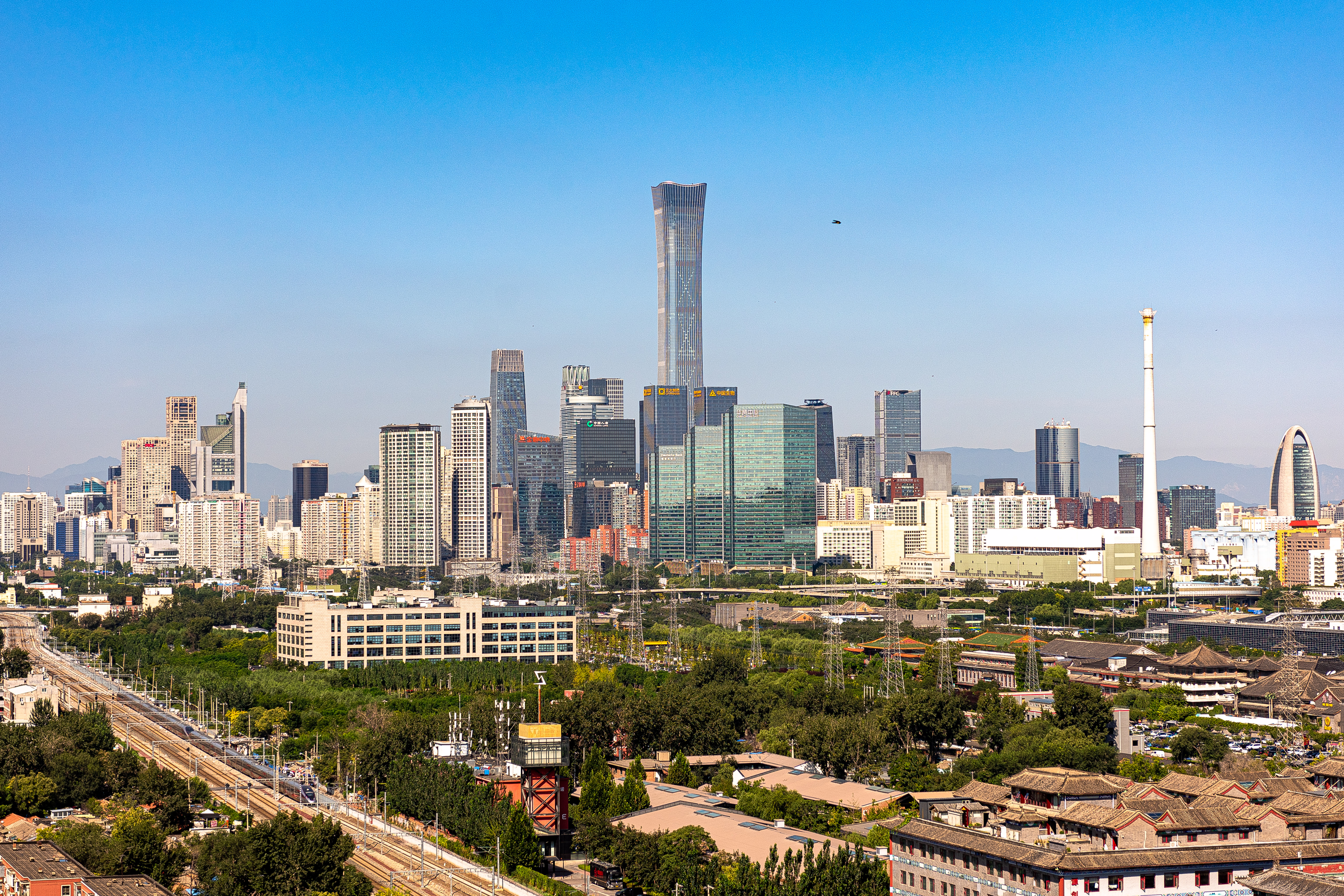
Skyline of Beijing from the southeast

As of 2021, Beijing's gross regional products was CN¥4 trillion ($965 billion in GDP PPP), ranking among the 10th largest metropolitan economies in the world. Beijing's nominal GDP is projected to reach US$1.1 trillion in 2035, ranking among the top 10 largest cities in the world (together with Shanghai, Guangzhou and Shenzhen in China) according to a study by Oxford Economics, and its nominal GDP per capita is estimated to reach US$45,000 in 2030.

== Nature of Economy in Beijing ==
The city has a post-industrial economy that is dominated by the tertiary sector (services), which generated 76.9% of output, followed by the secondary sector (manufacturing, construction) at 22.2% and the primary sector (agriculture, mining) at 0.8%. The economy, which tripled in size from 2004 to 2012, grew at an annual rate of 7.7% in 2013. Owing to the concentration of state owned enterprises in the national capital, Beijing in 2013 had more Fortune Global 500 Company headquarters than any other city in the world. Beijing has been described as the "billionaire capital of the world" since overtaking New York in 2016. In 2012, PricewaterhouseCoopers rated Beijing's overall economic influence as No. 1 in China.

Beijing is home to 54 Fortune Global 500 companies, the most in the world, and over 100 of the largest companies in China.

Finance is one of the most important industries. By the end of 2007, there were 751 financial organizations in Beijing generating revenue of 128.6 billion RMB, 11.6% of the total financial industry revenue of the entire country. That also accounts for 13.8% of Beijing's GDP, the highest percentage of any Chinese city. In the 2020 Global Financial Centres Index, Beijing was ranked as having the 7th most competitive financial center in the world and fifth most competitive in Asia (after Shanghai, Tokyo, Hong Kong and Singapore).

== GDP of Beijing ==
In 2010, Beijing's nominal GDP reached 1.37 trillion RMB. Its per capita GDP was 78,194 RMB. In 2009, Beijing's nominal GDP was 1.19 trillion RMB (US$174 billion), a growth of 10.1% over the previous year. Its GDP per capita was 68,788 RMB (US$10,070), an increase of 6.2% over 2008. In 2009, Beijing's primary, secondary, and tertiary industries were worth 11.83 billion RMB, 274.31 billion RMB, and 900.45 billion RMB respectively. Urban disposable income per capita was 26,738 yuan, a real increase of 8.1% from the previous year. Per capita pure income of rural residents was 11,986 RMB, a real increase of 11.5%. The Engel's coefficient of Beijing's urban residents reached 31.8% in 2005, while that of the rural residents was 32.8%, declining 4.5 and 3.9 percentage points respectively compared to 2000. As of 2018, Beijing' Nominal GDP was US$458 billion (CN¥3.0 trillion), about 3.45% of the country's GDP and ranked 12th among province-level administrative units; its Nominal GDP per capita was US$21,261 (CN¥140,748) and ranked the 1st in the country.

Beijing's real estate and automobile sectors have continued to boom in recent years. In 2005, a total of 28,032,000 square metres (301,730,000 sq ft) of housing real estate was sold, for a total of 175.88 billion RMB. The total number of cars registered in Beijing in 2004 was 2,146,000, of which 1,540,000 were privately owned (a yearly increase of 18.7%).

The Beijing central business district (CBD), centered on the Guomao area, has been identified as the city's new central business district, and is home to a variety of corporate regional headquarters, shopping precincts, and high-end housing. Beijing Financial Street, in the Fuxingmen and Fuchengmen area, is a traditional financial center. The Wangfujing and Xidan areas are major shopping districts. Zhongguancun, dubbed "China's Silicon Valley", continues to be a major center in electronics and computer-related industries, as well as pharmaceuticals-related research. Meanwhile, Yizhuang, located to the southeast of the urban area, is becoming a new center in pharmaceuticals, information technology, and materials engineering. Shijingshan, on the western outskirts of the city, is among the major industrial areas. Specially designated industrial parks include Zhongguancun Science Park, Yongle Economic Development Zone, Beijing Economic-technological Development Area, and Tianzhu Airport Industrial Zone.

Agriculture is carried on outside the urban area, with wheat and maize (corn) being the main crops. Vegetables are also grown closer to the urban area in order to supply the city.

== Wage and Labor in Beijing ==
Like the country as a whole, Beijing also falls under the jurisdiction of minimum wage which stands at RMB 2,200. Due to the COVID-19 pandemic the minimum wage was not adjusted in the year 2020.

== Real estate ==
As part of its effort to address high real estate prices, Beijing places limitations on property purchases. As of at least 2023, to buy real estate, Beijing households must demonstrate that for the last two years they have resided legally in Beijing and paid their taxes. They can purchase no more than two pieces of real estate. Foreigners must have lived in the city and paid local taxes for at least five years in order to buy real estate.

== Counterfeit Markets ==
Less legitimate enterprises also exist. Urban Beijing is known for being a center of infringed goods; anything from the latest designer clothing to DVDs can be found in markets all over the city, often marketed to expatriates and international visitors.

== Environmental Aspect ==
The development of Beijing continues at a rapid pace, and the vast expansion has created a multitude of problems for the city. Beijing is known for its smog as well as the frequent "power-saving" programmes instituted by the government. To reduce air pollution, a number of major industries have been ordered to reduce emissions or leave the city. Beijing Capital Steel, once one of the city's largest employers and its single biggest polluter, has been relocating most of its operations to Tangshan, in nearby Hebei Province.

Beijing is increasingly becoming known for its innovative entrepreneurs and high-growth startup companies. This culture is backed by a large community of both Chinese and foreign venture capital firms, such as Sequoia Capital, whose head office in China is in Chaoyang, Beijing. Though Shanghai is seen as the economic center of China, this is typically based on the numerous large corporations based there, rather than for being a center for entrepreneurship.

== See also ==
- List of economic and technological development zones in Beijing
- China International Fair for Trade in Services
