= China Economic Databases =

The China Economic Databases (CED) (Chinese: 中國經濟資料庫) is a project of the China Studies Center at National Chengchi University, Taiwan. It collects and publishes information on China's economic development to support scholarly research. The CED is available in Chinese and English.

== Mission ==
The CED is designed for scholars, students and those interested in the study and development of the Economy of China. Anyone is able to add information to the platform by submitting relevant material.

== History ==
The CED is sponsored by the Center for China Studies in National Chengchi University, in Taiwan, and is supported by the Taiwan Ministry of Education. The project was launched in December 2003 and is currently directed by Dr. Chen-yuan Tung, a professor at the Graduate Institute of Development Studies, National Chengchi University.

== Databases ==
Currently there are ten databases:

1. China Economic Literature Index Database The China Economic Literature Database (CELD) currently collects data from 47 Chinese periodicals and 22 English sources. Additionally, online databases such as SSCI and EconLit are used to keep the database up-to-date. Information in the CELD range in topics including macroeconomics, capital investment, regional development, economical reform, trade between Taiwan and mainland China, Chinese foreign trade, Renminbi exchange, economical globalization, financial policy and financial reform. A search function is also available to ease your data collecting. Currently, the CELD has approximately 3,000 papers as of July 2007.

2. China Economic Experts Database

3. China Economic Books Database The China Economic Books Database (CEBD) main purpose is to form a comprehensive listing of all books on the topic of China's economy. The CEBD includes titles from all over the world including both English and Chinese (traditional and simplified) titles. Subjects of the books in the CEBD include China's economic globalization, regional economy, international trade, RMB exchange rate, and domestic economic development, financial market, industry development, commerce, investment, and overall economic policy evaluation and analysis. Every book in the CEBD is listed with relevant search info such as the author/editor's name(s), publisher, publication date, ISBN, key word(s), and classification. A full listing of the CEBD data sources can be found at.

4. China Economic Websites Database The China Economic Websites Database collects relevant websites and categorizes them into easy use according to various aspects of China's economy.

5. China Economic Government Reports Database The China Economic Policy Reports Database (CEPRD) is a platform that holds economic policy reports and Chinese government white papers. The database currently lists all reports since 2000, in both English and Chinese. The range of content included national development plans, agricultural policy, monetary policy, system reform policy, financial market supervision policy, commercial and investment reports, economical operation reports, and balance of payment reports. The reports are listed according policy name, issuing unit, date issued, content summary, source, along with full text linking and download capabilities. For a complete list of sources please see the following link:.

6. China Economic Analysis Reports Database The China Economic Reports Database (CERD) offers reports related to indicators of China's economy such as GDP, CPI, investment, and import and export volumes. Reports are published biweekly, monthly or annually, and therefore the CERD is constantly being updated. Reports are listed along with their title, publishing institution, content and abstract.

7. China Economic Conference Database The China Economic Conference Database (CECD) offers information on all the upcoming conferences related to China's economy. It aims not only to set a platform for scholars to communicate the issues of China's economy, but also to advertise and promote their conferences. Information includes theme of the conference, date, venue, sponsor, agenda, and conference link.

8. China Economic Call for Papers Database The China Economic Call for Papers Database is related to the Conference Database in providing the most up-to-date info on upcoming and current calls for papers as related to forthcoming conferences dealing with China's economy.

9. Renminbi Database The Renminbi (RMB) database is focused on relevant materials towards RMB research. Content includes RMB reports from academic journals, books, research papers, policy reports, research meetings, and syllabus that are within the sub-databases of the China Economic Databases platform.

10. The OpenCourseWare (OCW) Project gathers syllabi and related course materials to further promote research and learning in the field of China's economy. As of February 2008 the OCW site is approaching 100 courses from schools such as Harvard, Yale, Johns Hopkins and Peking University

== Publications ==
1. China Economic Database E-paper English-language publications of the bi-weekly China Economic Databases E-paper are available online. The E-paper gives updates of recent journals, books, and People's Republic of China's Government White Papers and Policy Reports. The China Economic Analysis Monthly is published online, and reports on recent macroeconomic developments. The E-paper and the China Economic Analysis Monthly are available in traditional and simplified Chinese.

2. China Economic Analysis Monthly This monthly publication provides an in-depth look at China's economy. Featuring graphs and text on various sectors of China's economy it is a valuable tool for scholars. Currently, this publication's text is only in Chinese.

3. China Economic World Ranking Report The China Economic World Ranking Report gives a clear overview of China's position in the world economy. Currently, the report is available only in Chinese. however the ranking tables are listed in both English and Chinese.

== See also ==
- Historical GDP of the People's Republic of China
