= List of top Chinese cities by GDP per capita =

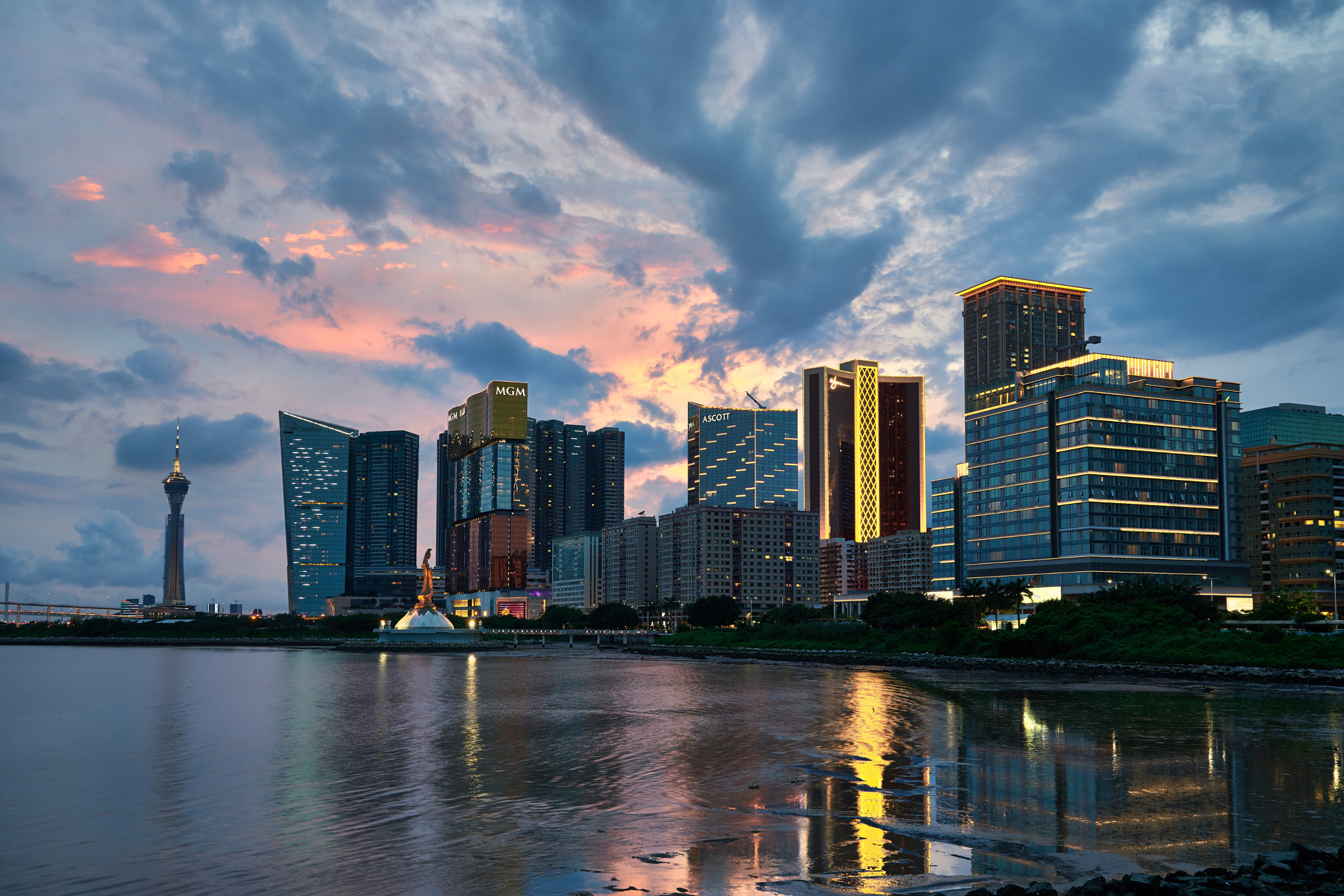
Macau has the highest GDP per capita in China (US$73,115).

As one of the types of administrative divisions in China, cities ‌include‌ three categories: municipalities, prefecture-level cities, and county-level cities. In addition, China's two special administrative regions are highly urbanized and commercialized, and are also one of the most densely populated areas in the world. While commonly recognized as major global cities in general discourse, ‌as provincial-level administrative divisions under Constitution of China, they are not classified within the city hierarchy of ordinary administrative divisions‌. In terms of area, some prefecture-level cities and municipalities are comparable in scope, and a portion of them have similar population and economic sizes falling within the same general order of magnitude. The most significant administrative division difference between municipalities and prefecture-level cities is that municipalities have no subordinate county-level cities. Mostly, ‌county-level cities in China‌ have been established through the overall conversion of existing counties, but their development focus, policies authorized by the central and provincial governments, and approved development plans are different from ‌those‌ of ordinary counties. Based on this, this entry includes China's prefecture-level cities, municipalities and special administrative regions. ‌Leagues and prefectures at the prefecture-level with prominent economic characteristics are also appropriately included‌. Unless unique resource development drives GDP growth, leading to a sharp increase in ‌per capita GDP‌ and attracting widespread attention, such administrative regions are only included as case studies due to their limited advantages in overall population size and economic development level. If you want to fully understand the ‌economic‌ level of prefecture-level administrative regions, please refer to the list of prefecture-level divisions of China by GDP.

The GDP indicators included in this entry are all based on nominal GDP at current prices. The converted US dollar GDP data is calculated based on the annual average exchange rate announced by the National Bureau of Statistics (NBS) of the Chinese government for that year. The IMF publishes the purchasing power parity (PPP) index for various currencies, calculated based on the average purchasing power of the US dollar in the United States and the average purchasing power of each currency in its local economy, and the standard unit of virtual currency under the purchasing power parity framework is the international dollar. This index is adjusted twice a year, and the data varies significantly between adjustments. For this reason, purchasing power parity-adjusted GDP figures are no longer included in this entry.

== Methodology ==
A county-level city in China is ‌usually administratively under the jurisdiction of a prefecture-level city‌. Compared with prefecture-level cities, the economic size and population size of a county-level city are not on the same order of magnitude. Including China's county-level cities and prefecture-level cities in the same set of comparative data is like including U.S. states and U.S. counties in the same set of data for comparison. In fact, they are not comparable. This entry does not include the per capita GDP of a county-level city.

The GDP per capita here is based on the annual average population. The annual average population or mid-year population is the average of the resident population at the end of the two consecutive years.

The per capita GDP of mainland China exceeded US$10,000 for the first time in 2018, and only 11 of the 31 provinces had a per capita GDP of over US$10,000 in 2018, and as of 2023, the per capita GDP of mainland China exceeded US$13,000, with 11 provinces exceeding the average level; 21 provinces had a per capita GDP of over US$10,000, accounting for the absolute majority. The per capita GDP of the cities included in this entry cannot be lower than the average level in order to highlight the characteristics of the entry.

According to the level of economic development, the top 90 Chinese cities in terms of nominal GDP per capita can basically reflect the overall development level of China's economy. The per capita GDP levels of these cities are higher than the national average. The unit of measurement for the data listed is the local currency Chinese yuan. In order to facilitate international comparison, the local currency is converted into US dollars, and the purchasing power parity (int'l dollar) indicators change too frequently and cannot be used as the main reference. All GDP data are officially released by the cities. This entry currently contains GDP data for 2023 and 2024, of which the 2023 GDP is revised based on the results of the fifth national economic census in 2023.

== List ==
List of top 90 Chinese cities by GDP per capita (based on 2024)
Nominal GDP is based on the official annual average exchange rate at CNY 7.1217 per US dollar in 2024 All economic and demographic indicators are based on 2024 data and fully updated through August 8, 2025.
Rank	Cities			GDP per capita		Reference index (2024)		
Rank	City	城市	Province	CNY	USD	GDP (CNY mil.)	GDP (USD mil.)	mid-yr. pop.
1	Macau	澳门	SAR	520,700	73,115	357,200	50,157	687,300
2	Hong Kong	香港	SAR	385,398	53,939	2,899,775	407,176	7,524,100
3	Ordos	鄂尔多斯	Inner Mongolia	285,286	40,059	636,303	89,347	2,230,400
4	Karamay	克拉玛依	Xinjiang	270,292	37,953	132,700	18,633	490,950
5	Beijing	北京	municipality	228,167	32,038	4,984,310	699,876	21,845,000
6	Shanghai	上海	municipality	217,109	30,486	5,392,671	757,217	24,838,550
7	Wuxi	无锡	Jiangsu	216,844	30,448	1,626,329	228,362	7,500,000
8	Yulin	榆林	Shaanxi	208,995	29,346	754,868	105,995	3,611,900
9	Suzhou	苏州	Jiangsu	206,028	28,930	2,672,700	375,290	12,972,500
10	Shenzhen	深圳	Guangdong	205,714	28,886	3,680,187	516,757	17,889,800
11	Changzhou	常州	Jiangsu	200,978	28,220	1,081,360	151,840	5,380,500
12	Dongying	东营	Shandong	195,170	27,405	430,770	60,487	2,207,150
13	Nanjing	南京	Jiangsu	193,483	27,168	1,850,081	259,781	9,562,000
14	Zhoushan	舟山	Zhejiang	189,548	26,616	222,624	31,260	1,174,500
15	Ningbo	宁波	Zhejiang	186,379	26,171	1,814,770	254,823	9,737,000
16	Haixi Prefecture	海西州	Qinghai	179,617	25,221	84,788	11,906	472,050
17	Zhuhai	珠海	Guangdong	178,712	25,094	447,906	62,893	2,506,300
18	Hangzhou	杭州	Zhejiang	173,865	24,413	2,186,000	306,949	12,573,000
19	Zhenjiang	镇江	Jiangsu	171,677	24,106	554,001	77,791	3,227,000
20	Yangzhou	扬州	Jiangsu	170,297	23,912	780,964	109,660	4,585,900
21	Fuzhou	福州	Fujian	167,787	23,560	1,423,676	199,907	8,485,000
22	Baotou	包头	Inner Mongolia	165,351	23,218	457,510	64,242	2,766,900
23	Guangzhou	广州	Guangdong	164,171	23,052	3,103,250	435,746	18,902,500
24	Hami	哈密	Xinjiang	162,151	22,769	108,439	15,227	668,750
25	Xiamen	厦门	Fujian	160,888	22,591	858,901	120,603	5,338,500
26	Qingdao	青岛	Shandong	160,656	22,559	1,671,946	234,768	10,407,000
27	Nantong	南通	Jiangsu	160,298	22,508	1,242,190	174,423	7,749,250
28	Yichang	宜昌	Hubei	157,725	22,147	619,110	86,933	3,925,250
29	Taizhou	泰州	Jiangsu	156,351	21,954	702,095	98,585	4,490,500
30	Shaoxing	绍兴	Zhejiang	154,645	21,715	836,860	117,508	5,411,500
31	Changji	昌吉州	Xinjiang	154,571	21,704	250,923	35,234	1,623,350
32	Alxa	阿拉善盟	Inner Mongolia	153,840	21,602	41,360	5,808	268,850
33	Yantai	烟台	Shandong	153,302	21,526	1,078,283	151,408	7,033,700
34	Wuhan	武汉	Hubei	153,037	21,489	2,110,623	296,365	13,791,550
35	Quanzhou	泉州	Fujian	147,158	20,663	1,309,487	183,873	8,898,500
36	Changsha	长沙	Hunan	144,525	20,294	1,526,878	214,398	10,564,800
37	Jinan	济南	Shandong	142,759	20,046	1,352,760	189,949	9,475,850
38	Foshan	佛山	Guangdong	138,363	19,428	1,336,190	187,622	9,657,150
39	Hefei	合肥	Anhui	136,063	19,105	1,350,770	189,670	9,927,500
40	Wuhu	芜湖	Anhui	135,589	19,039	512,050	71,900	3,776,500
41	Jiaxing	嘉兴	Zhejiang	135,267	18,994	756,953	106,288	5,596,000
42	Tianjin	天津	municipality	132,143	18,555	1,802,432	253,090	13,640,000
43	Tangshan	唐山	Hebei	129,569	18,194	1,000,390	140,471	7,720,900
44	Weihai	威海	Shandong	127,951	17,966	372,862	52,356	2,914,100
45	Longyan	龙岩	Fujian	127,065	17,842	341,868	48,004	2,690,500
46	Maanshan	马鞍山	Anhui	126,806	17,806	278,465	39,101	2,196,000
47	Dalian	大连	Liaoning	126,185	17,718	951,690	133,632	7,542,000
48	Ezhou	鄂州	Hubei	125,063	17,561	134,130	18,834	1,072,500
49	Ningde	宁德	Fujian	123,403	17,328	390,199	54,790	3,162,000
50	Huzhou	湖州	Zhejiang	122,057	17,139	421,340	59,163	3,452,000
51	Sanming	三明	Fujian	120,583	16,932	292,294	41,043	2,424,000
52	Yingtan	鹰潭	Jiangxi	120,550	16,927	138,434	19,438	1,148,350
53	Zhangzhou	漳州	Fujian	119,612	16,795	606,371	85,144	5,069,500
54	Huai'an	淮安	Jiangsu	119,473	16,776	541,302	76,007	4,538,300
55	Nanchang	南昌	Jiangxi	117,843	16,547	780,037	109,530	6,619,300
56	Dongguan	东莞	Guangdong	116,661	16,381	1,228,215	172,461	10,528,050
57	Yancheng	盐城	Jiangsu	116,455	16,352	777,920	109,232	6,680,000
58	Jinchang	金昌	Gansu	116,448	16,351	50,480	7,088	433,500
59	Xiangyang	襄阳	Hubei	115,596	16,231	610,241	85,688	5,279,100
60	Panzhihua	攀枝花	Sichuan	114,317	16,052	139,524	19,591	1,220,500
61	Yuxi	玉溪	Yunnan	113,975	16,004	258,210	36,257	2,265,500
62	Lhasa	拉萨	Tibet	113,563	15,946	99,004	13,902	871,800
63	Hohhot	呼和浩特	Inner Mongolia	113,400	15,923	410,708	57,670	3,621,750
64	Zhengzhou	郑州	Henan	111,383	15,640	1,453,210	204,054	13,047,000
65	Xilingol	锡林郛勒盟	Inner Mongolia	110,898	15,572	123,596	17,355	1,114,500
66	Chengdu	成都	Sichuan	109,850	15,425	2,351,130	330,136	21,403,000
67	Xiangtan	湘潭	Hunan	109,663	15,398	295,706	41,522	2,696,500
68	Ürümqi	乌鲁木齐	Xinjiang	109,632	15,394	416,850	58,532	4,084,800
69	Fangchenggang	防城港	Guangxi	108,670	15,259	116,755	16,394	1,074,400
70	Putian	莆田	Fujian	108,075	15,175	344,274	48,342	3,185,500
71	Wuhai	乌海	Inner Mongolia	106,973	15,021	59,557	8,363	556,750
72	Xuzhou	徐州	Jiangsu	105,792	14,855	953,712	133,916	9,015,000
73	Yan'an	延安	Shaanxi	105,709	14,843	238,336	33,466	2,254,650
74	Daqing	大庆	Heilongjiang	105,008	14,745	281,580	39,538	2,681,500
75	Zibo	淄博	Shandong	104,913	14,731	488,408	68,580	4,655,350
76	Yueyang	岳阳	Hunan	102,770	14,431	512,766	72,001	4,989,450
77	Panjin	盘锦	Liaoning	102,468	14,388	141,350	19,848	1,379,460
78	Tongling	铜陵	Anhui	101,844	14,301	132,550	18,612	1,301,500
79	Lianyungang	连云港	Jiangsu	101,641	14,272	466,313	65,478	4,587,850
80	Zhuzhou	株洲	Hunan	101,497	14,252	390,245	54,797	3,844,900
81	Xi'an	西安	Shaanxi	101,485	14,250	1,331,778	187,003	13,122,900
82	Chongqing	重庆	municipality	100,889	14,166	3,219,315	452,043	31,909,500
83	Huizhou	惠州	Guangdong	100,677	14,137	613,639	86,165	6,095,100
84	Chuzhou	滁州	Anhui	99,480	13,969	403,440	56,649	4,055,500
85	Wenzhou	温州	Zhejiang	99,106	13,916	971,880	136,467	9,806,500
86	Taizhou, Zhejiang	台州	Zhejiang	99,046	13,908	665,640	93,466	6,720,500
87	Taiyuan	太原	Shanxi	98,803	13,874	541,887	76,090	5,479,700
88	Quzhou	衢州	Zhejiang	98,470	13,827	226,283	31,774	2,298,000
89	Jiayuguan	嘉峪关	Gansu	98,365	13,812	30,990	4,351	315,050
90	Shenyang	沈阳	Liaoning	97,871	13,743	902,710	126,755	9,223,500

== See also ==
- Economy of China
- Historical GDP of China
- List of Chinese provincial-level divisions by GDP
- List of Chinese provincial-level divisions by GDP per capita
- List of top Chinese cities by GDP
- List of prefecture-level divisions of China by GDP
- List of top Chinese counties by GDP
- Prefecture-level city
- List of cities in China
- List of twin towns and sister cities in China
- Sub-provincial division
- List of capitals in China
- List of the largest administrative divisions by GRDP
- List of Chinese provincial-level divisions by population
- List of cities in China by population
- List of renminbi exchange rates
- Provincial city
- Administrative divisions of China
- Global city
