= List of top Chinese cities by GDP =

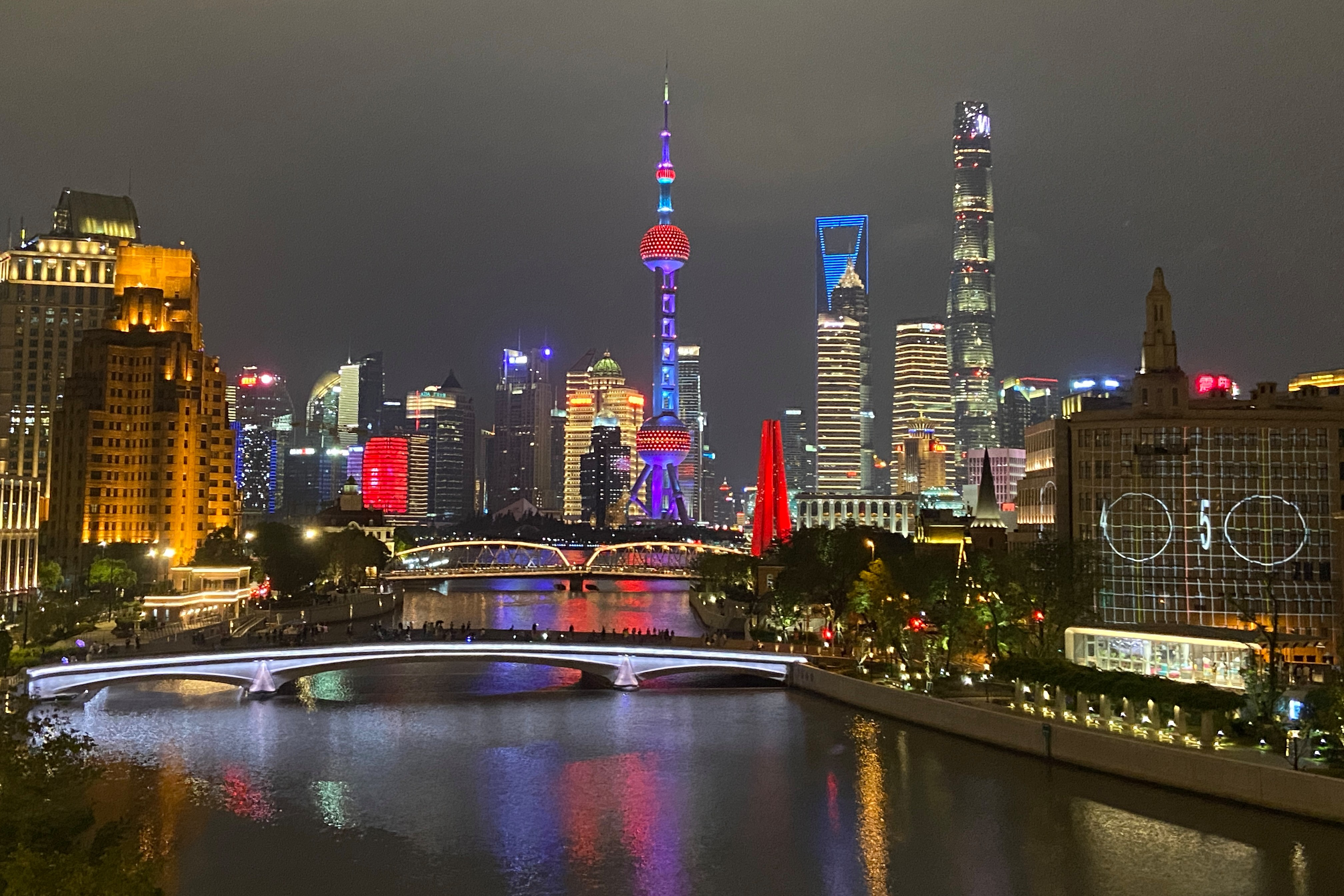
Ever since the founding of the People's Republic of China in 1949, Shanghai has consistently held the first position in GDP ranking among all cities in mainland China, and it further surpassed Hong Kong and Singapore in 2009 to be the top in Greater China

Statistically, China does not have a simple concept of metropolitan areas. In the country's long-term development plan, China's regional economic layout and planning include large areas such as the Guangdong-Hong Kong-Macao Greater Bay Area, the Yangtze River Delta, and the Bohai Economic Rim; smaller areas include the Chengdu-Chongqing Economic Circle and the Yangtze River Midstream Megalopolis, with those five making up the "3+2" part of China's 3+2+N plan. Even smaller areas include the Shanghai Pudong New Area,Tianjin Binhai New Area, Sichuan Tianfu New Area, Chongqing Liangjiang New Area, Hunan Xiangjiang New Area, Shaanxi Xixian New Area, Guangzhou Nansha New Area, and Hebei Xiong'an New Area. This is an industrial layout and national long-term development plan formed after decades of industrialization. However, only administrative divisions above the county level regularly publish social and economic development indicators.

As one of the types of administrative divisions in China, cities includes three categories: municipalities, prefecture-level cities, and county-level cities. In addition, China's two special administrative regions are highly commercialized and densely populated areas in the world. Both the international and Chinese governments classify them as cities. In terms of area, prefecture-level cities and municipalities are comparable, and the population and economic sizes are not much different, belonging to the same order of magnitude. There are no county-level cities in municipalities, which is the biggest difference between municipalities and prefecture-level cities in administrative divisions. Mostly, a China's county-level city has all been reformed and developed from a county as a whole, but the development focus, policies authorized by the central and provincial governments, and authorized development plan are different from that of a county. Based on this, this entry only includes China's prefecture-level cities, municipalities and special administrative regions. If you want to fully understand the economic level of prefecture-level administrative regions, you must refer to list of prefecture-level divisions of China by GDP.

The GDP indicators included in this entry are all based on nominal GDP at current price. The converted US dollar GDP data is calculated based on the annual average exchange rate announced by the Chinese government (NBS) that year. The IMF publishes the purchasing power parity index of various currencies based on the average purchasing power of the US dollar in the United States and the average purchasing power of various currencies in the local area. It is adjusted twice a year, and the data varies greatly each time. The purchasing power parity of the GDP indicator is no longer included in the entry.

== Methodology ==
A county-level city is itself a type of administrative divisions of a prefecture-level city. Compared with prefecture-level cities, the economic size and population size of a county-level city are not on the same order of magnitude. Including China's county-level cities and prefecture-level cities in the same set of comparative data is like including U.S. states and U.S. counties in the same set of data for comparison. In fact, they are not comparable. This entry does not include GDP of a county-level city.

This entry includes top 50 cities in the mainland China in terms of nominal GDP, plus Hong Kong SAR which is a larger city with economic size. As of 2024, the total nominal GDP of the 50 cities (excluding Hong Kong) is 10.241 trillion US dollars with accounting for 54.06% of the mainland in the year. These cities are the economic centers of various places round the country, which also reflects the characteristics of China's economic distribution. In order to facilitate international comparison, the local currency is converted into US dollars, and the purchasing power parity (int'l dollar) indicators change too frequently and cannot be used as the main reference. All GDP data are officially released by the cities. This entry currently contains GDP data for 2023 and 2024, of which the 2023 GDP is revised based on the results of the fifth national economic census in 2023.

== List ==
List of Top Chinese cities by Nominal GDP (current price, revision based on the 5th economic census 2023, millions of GDP)
rank	cities	城市	provinces	GDP in 2024 (ExRate: ¥7.1217 per USD)		GDP in 2023 (revision data) (ExRate: ¥7.0467 per USD)	
rank	cities	城市	provinces	(CNY)	(USD)	(CNY)	(USD)
1	Shanghai	上海	municipality	5,392,671	757,216	5,140,447	729,483
2	Beijing	北京	municipality	4,984,310	699,876	4,735,370	671,998
3	Shenzhen	深圳	Guangdong	3,680,187	516,757	3,490,327	495,314
4	Chongqing	重庆	municipality	3,219,315	452,043	3,061,428	434,448
5	Guangzhou	广州	Guangdong	3,103,250	435,746	3,072,356	435,999
6	Hong Kong	香港	SAR	2,899,775	407,176	2,685,742	381,139
7	Suzhou	苏州	Jiangsu	2,672,698	375,289	2,551,340	362,062
8	Chengdu	成都	Sichuan	2,351,130	330,136	2,233,660	316,980
9	Hangzhou	杭州	Zhejiang	2,186,000	306,949	2,096,000	297,444
10	Wuhan	武汉	Hubei	2,110,623	296,365	2,020,300	286,702
11	Nanjing	南京	Jiangsu	1,850,081	259,781	1,779,640	252,549
12	Ningbo	宁波	Zhejiang	1,814,770	254,823	1,714,660	243,328
13	Tianjin	天津	municipality	1,802,432	253,090	1,721,179	244,253
14	Qingdao	青岛	Shandong	1,671,946	234,768	1,597,316	226,676
15	Wuxi	无锡	Jiangsu	1,626,329	228,362	1,553,819	220,503
16	Changsha	长沙	Hunan	1,526,878	214,398	1,451,755	206,019
17	Zhengzhou	郑州	Henan	1,453,210	204,054	1,392,680	197,636
18	Fuzhou	福州	Fujian	1,423,676	199,907	1,342,689	190,542
19	Jinan	济南	Shandong	1,352,760	189,949	1,300,580	184,566
20	Hefei	合肥	Anhui	1,350,770	189,670	1,278,730	181,465
21	Foshan	佛山	Guangdong	1,336,190	187,622	1,332,377	189,078
22	Xi'an	西安	Shaanxi	1,331,778	187,003	1,275,621	181,024
23	Quanzhou	泉州	Fujian	1,309,487	183,873	1,225,901	173,968
24	Nantong	南通	Jiangsu	1,242,189	174,423	1,182,800	167,852
25	Dongguan	东莞	Guangdong	1,228,215	172,461	1,186,983	168,445
26	Changzhou	常州	Jiangsu	1,081,359	151,840	1,029,700	146,125
27	Yantai	烟台	Shandong	1,078,283	151,408	1,026,614	145,687
28	Tangshan	唐山	Hebei	1,000,390	140,471	954,600	135,468
29	Wenzhou	温州	Zhejiang	971,880	136,467	922,060	130,850
30	Xuzhou	徐州	Jiangsu	953,712	133,916	901,244	127,896
31	Dalian	大连	Liaoning	951,690	133,632	911,340	129,329
32	Shenyang	沈阳	Liaoning	902,710	126,755	862,470	122,393
33	Xiamen	厦门	Fujian	858,901	120,603	814,293	115,557
34	Shaoxing	绍兴	Zhejiang	836,860	117,508	791,200	112,280
35	Kunming	昆明	Yunnan	827,522	116,197	798,479	113,312
36	Shijiazhuang	石家庄	Hebei	820,340	115,189	784,620	111,346
37	Weifang	潍坊	Shandong	820,320	115,186	778,300	110,449
38	Yangzhou	扬州	Jiangsu	780,964	109,660	742,326	105,344
39	Nanchang	南昌	Jiangxi	780,037	109,530	743,785	105,551
40	Yancheng	盐城	Jiangsu	777,918	109,232	743,287	105,480
41	Changchun	长春	Jilin	763,219	107,168	750,128	106,451
42	Jiaxing	嘉兴	Zhejiang	756,953	106,288	725,356	102,936
43	Yulin	榆林	Shaanxi	754,868	105,995	721,911	102,447
44	Taizhou, Jiangsu	泰州	Jiangsu	702,095	98,585	673,166	95,529
45	Jinhua	金华	Zhejiang	692,550	97,245	601,127	85,306
46	Taizhou, Zhejiang	台州	Zhejiang	665,640	93,466	631,479	89,613
47	Linyi	临沂	Shandong	655,580	92,054	627,050	88,985
48	Ordos	鄂尔多斯	Inner Mongolia	636,303	89,347	605,910	85,985
49	Yichang	宜昌	Hubei	619,112	86,933	575,635	81,689
50	Huizhou	惠州	Guangdong	613,639	86,165	594,471	84,362
51	Xiangyang	襄阳	Hubei	610,241	85,688	584,291	82,917

== See also ==
- Economy of China
- Historical GDP of China
- List of Chinese provincial-level divisions by GDP
- List of Chinese provincial-level divisions by GDP per capita
- List of top Chinese cities by GDP per capita
- List of prefecture-level divisions of China by GDP
- List of top Chinese counties by GDP
- Prefecture-level city
- List of cities in China by population
- List of cities in China
- List of twin towns and sister cities in China
- List of capitals in China
- Sub-provincial division
- List of the largest administrative divisions by GRDP
- List of renminbi exchange rates
- Provincial city
- Administrative divisions of China
- Global city
