= Historical GDP of China =

Overview of economic growth and decline in the East Asian country

This article includes a list of China's historical gross domestic product (GDP) values, the market value of all final goods and services produced by a nation in a given year. The GDP dollar estimates presented here are either calculated at market or government official exchange rates (nominal), or derived from purchasing power parity (PPP) calculations. This article also includes historical GDP growth. Unless otherwise specified, the GDP per capita here is based on the average population. The annual average population or mid-year population is the average of the resident population at the end of the two consecutive years.

In 1985, the State Council of China (SCC) approved the establishment of a SNA (System of National Accounting), using GDP to measure the national economy. China started to study and then implement a new system of national economic accounting. In 1986, as the first citizen of the People's Republic of China to receive a Ph.D. in economics from an overseas country, Fengbo Zhang headed Chinese Macroeconomic Research - the key research project of the seventh five-year plan, as well as completing and publishing the Chinese GDP data according to China's own research and calculations. A summary of the above events has been included in the book "Chinese Macroeconomic Structure and Policy" (June 1988) edited by Fengbo Zhang, and collectively authored by the Research Center of the SCC. This is the first GDP data which was published by China.

The research utilized the World Bank's method as a reference, and made numerous appropriate adjustments based on China's national condition. The GDP also has been converted to U.S. dollar-based data by utilizing the moving average exchange rate. The research systematically completed China's GDP and GDP per capita from 1952 to 1986 and analyzed growth rate, the change and contribution rates of each component. The research also included international comparisons. Additionally, the research compared MPS and SNA, looking at the results from the two systems from analyzing Chinese economy. This achievement created the foundation for China GDP research.

The SCC issued "The notice regarding implementation of System of National Accounting" in August 1992, the Western SNA system officially is introduced to China, replaced Soviet Union's MPS system, Western economic indicator GDP became China's most important economic indicator. Based on Dr. Fengbo Zhang's research, in 1997, the National Bureau of Statistics of China (NBS), in collaboration with Hitotsubashi University of Japan, re-estimated China's GDP Data from 1952 up to 1995 based on the SNA principal. In 2016, the 2008 SNA was formally brought into use.

During this period, there were many data adjustments, with weighting factors undergoing significant changes along with each year's comparable price amendments, statistical method significant changes result in the substantial deviation. Even with science and technology as advanced as it is today, the single item survey is allowed at least ±3%, or a total of 6% deviation. Despite the extremely difficult conditions of a destroyed economy, blank theory, a lack of data, and simple methods in the 1980s, there is so little deviation for such a long period of time and the comprehensiveness of the national economic indicator, indicates that the research conducted by Fengbo Zhang with the support of the extensive group he trained is extremely rigorous, and their result very precise. Xie Fuzhan, former director, and Ma Jiantang, current director of the NBS, both participated in Dr. Fengbo Zhang's research project in the 1980s, as assistant researcher and graduate student, respectively, of the Research Center of the SCC.

== Current status ==
Proportion of world (countries with data) nominal GDP for the countries with the top 10 highest nominal GDP in 2018, from 1980 to 2018 with IMF projections until 2024

The gross domestic product of China in 2019 was CN¥ 99.08651 trillion, or US$14.4 trillion (nominal).

China's nominal GDP surpassed that of Italy in 2000, France in 2005, the United Kingdom in 2006, Germany in 2007, Japan in 2010 and that of the Eurozone in 2018 making China the world's third largest economy after the European Union and United States. But adjusting for purchasing power parity (PPP), China became the world's second largest economy as early as 1999 surpassing Japan, and surpassed America’s in 2014.

From 1979 until 2010, China's average annual GDP growth was 9.91%, reaching a historical high of 15.2% in 1984 and a record low of 3.8% in 1990. Based on the current price, the country's average annual GDP growth in these 32 years was 15.8%, reaching an historical high of 36.41% in 1994 and a record low of 6.25% in 1999.

== China NBS data ==
=== Annual GDP ===
China's Historical Nominal GDP for 1952–present (current price) (the revised data released by NBS according to the results of the fifth national economic census in 2023)
year	GDP			GDP per capita based on mid-yr pop.			Reference index	
year	billions of GDP		real growth (%)	GDP per capita		real growth (%)	thousands of mid-yr pop.	ExRate
year	CNY	USD	real growth (%)	CNY	USD	real growth (%)	thousands of mid-yr pop.	ExRate
^{p}2026	147,670.00	21,546.40	4.5	104,600	15,371	4.5	1,404,890	6.8530
^{p}2025	140,187.92	19,626.19	5.0	99,665	13,953	5.2	1,406,585	7.1429
^{r}2024	134,806.62	18,928.99	5.0	95,677	13,435	5.1	1,408,975	7.1217
2023	129,427.17	18,367.06	5.4	91,746	13,020	5.5	1,410,710	7.0467
2022	123,402.94	18,346.88	3.1	87,385	12,992	3.1	1,412,175	6.7261
2021	117,382.30	18,194.57	8.6	83,111	12,882	8.5	1,412,360	6.4515
2020	103,486.76	15,003.30	2.3	73,338	10,632	2.1	1,411,100	6.8976
2019	100,587.24	14,581.03	6.1	71,453	10,358	5.7	1,407,745	6.8985
2018	93,601.01	14,144.68	6.8	66,726	10,083	6.3	1,402,760	6.6174
2017	84,738.29	12,550.47	6.9	60,691	8,989	6.2	1,396,215	6.7518
2016	76,119.30	11,459.78	6.8	54,849	8,258	6.2	1,387,790	6.6423
2015	70,251.15	11,279.16	7.0	50,912	8,174	6.4	1,379,860	6.2284
2014	65,578.29	10,675.63	7.5	47,802	7,782	6.8	1,371,860	6.1428
2013	60,366.04	9,747.15	7.8	44,281	7,150	7.1	1,363,240	6.1932
2012	54,751.06	8,673.44	7.9	40,431	6,405	7.1	1,354,190	6.3125
2011	49,570.76	7,674.92	9.5	36,855	5,706	8.9	1,345,035	6.4588
2010	41,925.33	6,193.27	10.6	31,341	4,630	10.1	1,337,705	6.7695
2009	35,452.16	5,189.89	9.4	26,631	3,899	8.9	1,331,260	6.8310
2008	32,431.78	4,669.74	9.7	24,483	3,525	9.1	1,324,655	6.9451
2007	27,417.97	3,605.73	14.2	20,805	2,736	13.6	1,317,885	7.6040
2006	22,257.84	2,792.07	12.7	16,977	2,130	12	1,311,020	7.9718
2005	18,990.75	2,318.29	11.5	14,567	1,778	10.8	1,303,720	8.1917
2004	16,422.80	1,984.20	10.1	12,671	1,531	9.5	1,296,075	8.2768
2003	13,937.73	1,683.91	10.1	10,818	1,307	9.4	1,288,400	8.2770
2002	12,331.19	1,489.81	9.2	9,631	1,164	8.5	1,280,400	8.2770
2001	11,215.73	1,355.05	8.3	8,818	1,065	7.5	1,271,850	8.2770
2000	10,130.86	1,223.77	8.6	8,024	969	7.7	1,262,645	8.2784
1999	9,137.89	1,103.84	7.7	7,294	881	6.8	1,252,735	8.2783
1998	8,586.39	1,037.12	7.9	6,914	835	6.9	1,241,935	8.2791
1997	8,022.50	967.76	9.3	6,522	787	8.2	1,230,075	8.2898
1996	7,221.06	868.52	10.0	5,931	713	8.8	1,217,550	8.3142
1995	6,164.94	738.23	11.0	5,117	613	9.8	1,204,855	8.3510
1994	4,886.22	566.93	13.1	4,100	476	11.8	1,191,835	8.6187
1993	3,581.97	621.65	13.9	3,040	528	12.6	1,178,440	5.7620
1992	2,729.56	494.97	14.3	2,343	425	12.9	1,164,970	5.5146
1991	2,207.09	414.61	9.4	1,918	360	7.9	1,150,780	5.3233
1990	1,890.96	395.33	3.9	1,666	348	2.4	1,135,185	4.7832
1989	1,721.00	457.09	4.2	1,538	408	2.6	1,118,650	3.7651
1988	1,520.64	408.54	11.2	1,380	371	9.4	1,101,630	3.7221
1987	1,219.61	327.67	11.7	1,125	302	9.9	1,084,035	3.7221
1986	1,039.52	301.07	8.9	974	282	7.3	1,066,790	3.4528
1985	911.59	310.41	13.4	867	295	11.9	1,051,040	2.9367
1984	729.24	313.38	15.2	703	302	13.7	1,036,825	2.3270
1983	603.25	305.33	10.8	590	299	9.2	1,023,310	1.9757
1982	538.36	284.47	9.0	534	282	7.4	1,008,630	1.8925
1981	494.47	290.01	5.1	498	292	3.8	993,885	1.7050
1980	459.57	306.71	7.8	468	312	6.5	981,235	1.4984
1979	410.72	264.15	7.6	424	273	6.2	969,005	1.5549
1978	368.48	218.86	11.7	385	229	10.2	956,165	1.6836
1977	325.54	175.23	7.6	345	186	6.1	943,460	1.8578
1976	299.36	154.20	-1.6	322	166	-3.1	930,690	1.9414
1975	304.43	163.69	8.7	332	179	6.8	916,400	1.8598
1974	283.22	144.41	2.3	315	161	0.2	900,350	1.9612
1973	276.06	138.77	7.8	313	157	5.3	881,940	1.9894
1972	255.65	113.87	3.8	297	132	1.3	862,030	2.2451
1971	246.08	99.96	7.1	293	119	4.2	841,110	2.4618
1970	228.34	92.75	19.3	279	113	16.1	818,320	2.4618
1969	196.57	79.85	16.9	247	100	13.7	796,030	2.4618
1968	174.74	70.98	-4.0	226	92	-6.5	774,510	2.4618
1967	179.74	73.01	-5.7	238	97	-8.1	754,550	2.4618
1966	189.20	76.85	10.7	257	104	7.6	735,400	2.4618
1965	173.72	70.57	17.0	243	99	14.2	715,190	2.4618
1964	147.27	59.82	18.2	211	86	15.5	698,360	2.4618
1963	125.09	50.81	10.3	183	74	7.6	682,340	2.4618
1962	116.47	47.31	-5.6	175	71	-6.3	665,770	2.4618
1961	123.49	50.16	-27.3	187	76	-26.5	660,330	2.4618
1960	147.33	59.85		221	90	-0.2	667,070	2.4618
1959	145.05	55.43	9.0	218	83	6.9	666,010	2.6170
1958	131.49	50.50	21.3	201	77	18.4	653,240	2.6040
1957	107.35	41.23	5.1	168	65	2.4	637,410	2.6040
1956	103.26	39.65	15.0	166	64	12.7	621,470	2.6040
1955	91.31	35.07	6.9	150	58	4.6	608,660	2.6040
1954	86.12	33.07	4.3	145	56	1.8	595,310	2.6040
1953	82.59	31.72	15.6	142	55	13.1	581,390	2.6040
1952	68.02	30.60		120	54		568,910	2.2227

==== Gross national income and GDP by industries ====
Components of GDP by Industries (Revision based on the 5th Economic Census 2023)
GDP by Industries (CNY)

===== GDP by industries (Chinese yuan) =====
Components of GDP by Industries (current current price Chinese yuan, per capita based on mid-year population)
year	GNI in billions	GDP by Industries (in billions)				per capita	
year	GNI in billions	GDP	Agriculture	Industry	Services	GNI	GDP
^{p}2025	139,405.29	140,187.92	9,334.68	49,965.30	80,887.93	99,109	99,665
^{r}2024	134,042.90	134,806.62	9,163.58	49,030.54	76,612.49	95,135	95,677
2023	128,477.39	129,427.17	8,916.91	47,593.61	72,916.65	91,073	91,746
2022	122,370.68	123,402.94	8,820.70	46,762.96	67,819.27	86,654	87,385
2021	116,581.68	117,382.30	8,321.65	44,713.82	64,346.84	82,544	83,111
2020	102,675.19	103,486.76	7,803.09	38,198.58	57,485.09	72,763	73,338
2019	100,310.84	100,587.24	7,047.36	37,986.00	55,553.89	71,257	71,453
2018	93,197.25	93,601.01	6,474.52	36,483.52	50,642.98	66,438	66,726
2017	84,629.27	84,738.29	6,209.95	33,158.05	45,370.29	60,613	60,691
2016	75,749.20	76,119.30	6,013.92	29,542.78	40,562.60	54,582	54,849
2015	69,922.45	70,251.15	5,777.46	28,133.89	36,339.79	50,674	50,912
2014	65,660.00	65,578.29	5,562.63	27,728.28	32,287.38	47,862	47,802
2013	59,883.84	60,366.04	5,302.81	26,195.16	28,868.07	43,927	44,281
2012	54,625.97	54,751.06	4,908.46	24,463.91	25,378.69	40,339	40,431
2011	49,116.02	49,570.76	4,478.15	22,703.51	22,389.10	36,517	36,855
2010	41,748.81	41,925.33	3,843.08	19,162.65	18,919.59	31,209	31,341
2009	35,393.88	35,452.16	3,358.38	16,016.88	16,076.90	26,587	26,631
2008	32,630.27	32,431.78	3,246.41	14,995.29	14,190.07	24,633	24,483
2007	27,479.14	27,417.97	2,767.41	12,663.05	11,987.50	20,851	20,805
2006	22,216.84	22,257.84	2,331.70	10,435.92	9,490.22	16,946	16,977
2005	18,858.76	18,990.75	2,180.67	8,808.22	8,001.86	14,466	14,567
2004	16,380.32	16,422.80	2,090.43	7,428.50	6,903.87	12,638	12,671
2003	13,853.15	13,937.73	1,697.02	6,269.58	5,971.13	10,752	10,818
2002	12,207.49	12,331.19	1,619.02	5,410.41	5,301.76	9,534	9,631
2001	11,057.03	11,215.73	1,550.25	4,965.94	4,699.54	8,693	8,818
2000	10,009.46	10,130.86	1,471.74	4,566.37	4,092.76	7,928	8,024
1999	9,018.10	9,137.89	1,454.90	4,107.99	3,575.00	7,198	7,294
1998	8,448.60	8,586.39	1,461.87	3,901.75	3,222.77	6,803	6,914
1997	7,931.28	8,022.50	1,426.52	3,754.50	2,841.48	6,448	6,522
1996	7,117.65	7,221.06	1,387.83	3,382.73	2,450.50	5,846	5,931
1995	6,066.62	6,164.94	1,202.05	2,867.67	2,095.22	5,035	5,117
1994	4,877.30	4,886.22	947.18	2,245.25	1,693.79	4,093	4,100
1993	3,574.58	3,581.97	688.76	1,647.27	1,245.95	3,034	3,040
1992	2,730.92	2,729.56	580.03	1,172.50	977.03	2,344	2,343
1991	2,211.56	2,207.09	528.88	912.96	765.25	1,922	1,918
1990	1,896.00	1,890.96	501.72	774.41	614.83	1,670	1,666
1989	1,721.87	1,721.00	422.82	730.07	568.11	1,539	1,538
1988	1,520.04	1,520.64	383.12	660.72	476.81	1,379	1,380
1987	1,218.81	1,219.61	320.45	527.38	371.78	1,124	1,125
1986	1,039.44	1,039.52	276.41	451.51	311.60	974	974
1985	914.06	911.59	254.17	388.64	268.78	869	867
1984	732.81	729.24	229.56	312.47	187.21	706	703
1983	605.54	603.25	196.09	266.30	140.86	592	590
1982	539.07	538.36	176.17	239.76	122.42	535	534
1981	494.25	494.47	154.57	226.90	113.00	498	498
1980	459.42	459.57	135.95	220.47	103.16	468	468
1979	410.72	410.72	125.9	192.53	92.29	424	424
1978	368.48	368.48	101.85	175.51	91.12	385	385
1977	325.54	325.54	94.22	151.78	79.55	345	345
1976	299.36	299.36	96.71	134.60	68.06	322	322
1975	304.43	304.43	97.12	137.87	69.45	332	332
1974	283.22	283.22	94.52	119.98	68.72	315	315
1973	276.06	276.06	90.75	118.03	67.28	313	313
1972	255.65	255.65	82.74	109.16	63.75	297	297
1971	246.08	246.08	82.63	102.99	60.46	293	293
1970	228.34	228.34	79.33	91.81	57.20	279	279
1969	196.57	196.57	73.62	69.50	53.45	247	247
1968	174.74	174.74	72.63	54.26	47.85	226	226
1967	179.74	179.74	71.42	60.80	47.51	238	238
1966	189.20	189.20	70.22	71.54	47.44	257	257
1965	173.72	173.72	65.11	60.85	47.76	243	243
1964	147.27	147.27	55.9	51.93	39.44	211	211
1963	125.09	125.09	49.75	41.28	34.06	183	183
1962	116.47	116.47	45.31	36.39	34.76	175	175
1961	123.49	123.49	44.11	39.35	40.03	187	187
1960	147.33	147.33	34.07	65.26	48.00	221	221
1959	145.05	145.05	38.38	61.67	44.99	218	218
1958	131.49	131.49	44.59	48.36	38.54	201	201
1957	107.35	107.35	43	31.66	32.69	168	168
1956	103.26	103.26	44.39	28.04	30.83	166	166
1955	91.31	91.31	42.1	22.15	27.06	150	150
1954	86.12	86.12	39.2	21.08	25.84	145	145
1953	82.59	82.59	37.8	19.16	25.63	142	142
1952	68.02	68.02	34.29	14.11	19.62	120	120

GDP by Industries (US dollars)

===== GDP by industries (US dollars) =====
Components of GDP by Industries (current price US dollars, per capita based on mid-year population)
year	GNI in billions	GDP by Industries (in billions)				per capita		ExRate
year	GNI in billions	GDP	Agriculture	Industry	Services	GNI	GDP	ExRate
^{p}2025	19,516.62	19,626.19	1,306.85	6,995.10	11,324.24	13,875	13,953	7.1429
^{r}2024	18,821.76	18,928.99	1,286.71	6,884.67	10,757.61	13,358	13,435	7.1217
2023	18,232.28	18,367.06	1,265.40	6,754.03	10,347.63	12,924	13,020	7.0467
2022	18,193.41	18,346.88	1,311.41	6,952.46	10,083.00	12,883	12,992	6.7261
2021	18,070.48	18,194.57	1,289.88	6,930.76	9,973.93	12,795	12,882	6.4515
2020	14,885.64	15,003.30	1,131.28	5,537.95	8,334.07	10,549	10,632	6.8976
2019	14,540.96	14,581.03	1,021.58	5,506.41	8,053.04	10,329	10,358	6.8985
2018	14,083.67	14,144.68	978.41	5,513.27	7,653.00	10,040	10,083	6.6174
2017	12,534.33	12,550.47	919.75	4,910.99	6,719.73	8,977	8,989	6.7518
2016	11,404.06	11,459.78	905.40	4,447.67	6,106.71	8,217	8,258	6.6423
2015	11,226.39	11,279.16	927.60	4,517.03	5,834.53	8,136	8,174	6.2284
2014	10,688.94	10,675.63	905.55	4,513.95	5,256.13	7,791	7,782	6.1428
2013	9,669.29	9,747.15	856.23	4,229.66	4,661.25	7,093	7,150	6.1932
2012	8,653.62	8,673.44	777.58	3,875.47	4,020.39	6,390	6,405	6.3125
2011	7,604.51	7,674.92	693.34	3,515.13	3,466.45	5,654	5,706	6.4588
2010	6,167.19	6,193.27	567.71	2,830.73	2,794.83	4,610	4,630	6.7695
2009	5,181.36	5,189.89	491.64	2,344.73	2,353.52	3,892	3,899	6.8310
2008	4,698.32	4,669.74	467.44	2,159.12	2,043.18	3,547	3,525	6.9451
2007	3,613.77	3,605.73	363.94	1,665.31	1,576.47	2,742	2,736	7.6040
2006	2,786.93	2,792.07	292.49	1,309.10	1,190.47	2,126	2,130	7.9718
2005	2,302.18	2,318.29	266.20	1,075.26	976.83	1,766	1,778	8.1917
2004	1,979.06	1,984.20	252.57	897.51	834.12	1,527	1,531	8.2768
2003	1,673.69	1,683.91	205.03	757.47	721.41	1,299	1,307	8.2770
2002	1,474.87	1,489.81	195.60	653.67	640.54	1,152	1,164	8.2770
2001	1,335.87	1,355.05	187.30	599.97	567.78	1,050	1,065	8.2770
2000	1,209.11	1,223.77	177.78	551.60	494.39	958	969	8.2784
1999	1,089.37	1,103.84	175.75	496.24	431.85	870	881	8.2783
1998	1,020.47	1,037.12	176.57	471.28	389.27	822	835	8.2791
1997	956.75	967.76	172.08	452.91	342.77	778	787	8.2898
1996	856.08	868.52	166.92	406.86	294.74	703	713	8.3142
1995	726.45	738.23	143.94	343.39	250.89	603	613	8.3510
1994	565.90	566.93	109.90	260.51	196.52	475	476	8.6187
1993	620.37	621.65	119.53	285.89	216.24	527	528	5.7620
1992	495.22	494.97	105.18	212.62	177.17	425	425	5.5146
1991	415.45	414.61	99.35	171.50	143.75	361	360	5.3233
1990	396.39	395.33	104.89	161.90	128.54	349	348	4.7832
1989	457.32	457.09	112.30	193.90	150.89	409	408	3.7651
1988	408.38	408.54	102.93	177.51	128.10	371	371	3.7221
1987	327.45	327.67	86.09	141.69	99.88	302	302	3.7221
1986	301.04	301.07	80.05	130.77	90.25	282	282	3.4528
1985	311.25	310.41	86.55	132.34	91.52	296	295	2.9367
1984	314.92	313.38	98.65	134.28	80.45	304	302	2.3270
1983	306.49	305.33	99.25	134.79	71.30	300	299	1.9757
1982	284.85	284.47	93.09	126.69	64.69	283	282	1.8925
1981	289.88	290.01	90.66	133.08	66.28	292	292	1.7050
1980	306.61	306.71	90.73	147.14	68.85	312	312	1.4984
1979	264.15	264.15	80.97	123.82	59.35	273	273	1.5549
1978	218.86	218.86	60.50	104.25	54.12	229	229	1.6836
1977	175.23	175.23	50.72	81.70	42.82	186	186	1.8578
1976	154.20	154.20	49.81	69.33	35.06	166	166	1.9414
1975	163.69	163.69	52.22	74.13	37.34	179	179	1.8598
1974	144.41	144.41	48.19	61.18	35.04	161	161	1.9612
1973	138.77	138.77	45.62	59.33	33.82	157	157	1.9894
1972	113.87	113.87	36.85	48.62	28.40	132	132	2.2451
1971	99.96	99.96	33.56	41.84	24.56	119	119	2.4618
1970	92.75	92.75	32.22	37.29	23.24	113	113	2.4618
1969	79.85	79.85	29.90	28.23	21.71	100	100	2.4618
1968	70.98	70.98	29.50	22.04	19.44	92	92	2.4618
1967	73.01	73.01	29.01	24.70	19.30	97	97	2.4618
1966	76.85	76.85	28.52	29.06	19.27	104	104	2.4618
1965	70.57	70.57	26.45	24.72	19.40	99	99	2.4618
1964	59.82	59.82	22.71	21.09	16.02	86	86	2.4618
1963	50.81	50.81	20.21	16.77	13.84	74	74	2.4618
1962	47.31	47.31	18.41	14.78	14.12	71	71	2.4618
1961	50.16	50.16	17.92	15.98	16.26	76	76	2.4618
1960	59.85	59.85	13.84	26.51	19.50	90	90	2.4618
1959	55.43	55.43	14.67	23.57	17.19	83	83	2.6170
1958	50.50	50.50	17.12	18.57	14.80	77	77	2.6040
1957	41.23	41.23	16.51	12.16	12.55	65	65	2.6040
1956	39.65	39.65	17.05	10.77	11.84	64	64	2.6040
1955	35.07	35.07	16.17	8.51	10.39	58	58	2.6040
1954	33.07	33.07	15.05	8.10	9.92	56	56	2.6040
1953	31.72	31.72	14.52	7.36	9.84	55	55	2.6040
1952	30.60	30.60	15.43	6.35	8.83	54	54	2.2227

GNI and GDP by purchasing power parity (intl. dollars)

===== GNI and GDP by purchasing power parity (PPP) =====
GNI and GDP by purchasing power parity (current price (intl. dollar), per capita based on mid-year population) (Purchasing power parity is referenced from the IMF April 2026 World Economic Outlook)
year	GNI in billions	GDP by Industries (in billions)				per capita		ExRate
year	GNI in billions	GDP	Agriculture	Industry	Services	GNI	GDP	ExRate
^{p}2025	41,011.21	41,241.45	2,746.14	14,699.14	23,796.17	29,157	29,320	3.3992
^{r}2024	37,960.66	38,176.95	2,595.11	13,885.34	21,696.49	26,942	27,096	3.5311
2023	35,246.60	35,507.17	2,446.27	13,056.87	20,004.02	24,985	25,170	3.6451
2022	32,237.59	32,509.53	2,323.74	12,319.33	17,866.45	22,828	23,021	3.7959
2021	29,237.52	29,438.31	2,086.99	11,213.78	16,137.54	20,701	20,843	3.9874
2020	25,574.81	25,776.96	1,943.63	9,514.68	14,318.65	18,124	18,267	4.0147
2019	24,709.54	24,777.62	1,735.97	9,357.08	13,684.57	17,553	17,601	4.0596
2018	22,763.79	22,862.41	1,581.43	8,911.24	12,369.75	16,228	16,298	4.0941
2017	20,947.32	20,974.31	1,537.08	8,207.23	11,229.99	15,003	15,022	4.0401
2016	19,144.06	19,237.59	1,519.89	7,466.33	10,251.36	13,794	13,862	3.9568
2015	17,709.96	17,793.21	1,463.31	7,125.75	9,204.14	12,835	12,895	3.9482
2014	16,491.27	16,470.75	1,397.12	6,964.28	8,109.35	12,021	12,006	3.9815
2013	14,916.89	15,037.00	1,320.91	6,525.14	7,190.95	10,942	11,030	4.0145
2012	13,729.26	13,760.70	1,233.65	6,148.56	6,378.48	10,138	10,162	3.9788
2011	12,500.90	12,616.64	1,139.77	5,778.44	5,698.42	9,294	9,380	3.9290
2010	11,275.54	11,323.21	1,037.94	5,175.46	5,109.81	8,429	8,465	3.7026
2009	10,037.97	10,054.50	952.46	4,542.51	4,559.53	7,540	7,553	3.5260
2008	9,190.07	9,134.17	914.33	4,223.31	3,996.53	6,938	6,895	3.5506
2007	8,149.21	8,131.07	820.70	3,755.35	3,555.01	6,184	6,170	3.3720
2006	6,923.51	6,936.28	726.64	3,252.18	2,957.47	5,281	5,291	3.2089
2005	5,922.61	5,964.06	684.84	2,766.23	2,512.99	4,543	4,575	3.1842
2004	5,207.54	5,221.05	664.58	2,361.63	2,194.84	4,018	4,028	3.1455
2003	4,585.31	4,613.31	561.70	2,075.20	1,976.41	3,559	3,581	3.0212
2002	4,068.49	4,109.71	539.58	1,803.17	1,766.96	3,177	3,210	3.0005
2001	3,654.97	3,707.43	512.45	1,641.52	1,553.46	2,874	2,915	3.0252
2000	3,307.60	3,347.72	486.33	1,508.95	1,352.44	2,620	2,652	3.0262
1999	2,974.50	3,014.01	479.88	1,354.97	1,179.17	2,374	2,406	3.0318
1998	2,711.36	2,755.58	469.15	1,252.17	1,034.27	2,183	2,219	3.1160
1997	2,491.68	2,520.34	448.15	1,179.51	892.68	2,026	2,049	3.1831
1996	2,233.62	2,266.07	435.52	1,061.55	769.00	1,835	1,861	3.1866
1995	1,993.30	2,025.61	394.96	942.23	688.42	1,654	1,681	3.0435
1994	1,784.60	1,787.86	346.57	821.53	619.75	1,498	1,500	2.7330
1993	1,542.16	1,545.35	297.15	710.67	537.53	1,309	1,312	2.3179
1992	1,324.66	1,324.00	281.35	568.73	473.92	1,137	1,136	2.0616
1991	1,132.62	1,130.33	270.86	467.56	391.91	984	982	1.9526
1990	992.98	990.34	262.76	405.58	322.00	875	873	1.9094
1989	920.24	919.78	225.97	390.18	303.62	823	822	1.8711
1988	850.85	851.18	214.45	369.84	266.90	772	772	1.7865
1987	738.94	739.43	194.28	319.74	225.40	681	682	1.6494
1986	646.30	646.35	171.86	280.74	193.74	606	606	1.6083
1985	583.58	582.00	162.27	248.13	171.60	555	554	1.5663
1984	499.19	496.76	156.38	212.85	127.53	481	479	1.4680
1983	417.53	415.95	135.21	183.62	97.12	408	407	1.4503
1982	361.67	361.19	118.20	160.86	82.13	359	358	1.4905
1981	313.59	313.73	98.07	143.96	71.70	316	316	1.5761
1980	274.64	274.73	81.27	131.80	61.67	280	280	1.6728

=== Quarterly GDP ===
China's quarterly GDP estimation was formally established in 1992. Afterwards, following the development of SNA of China, quarterly GDP is successively standardized and improved in estimation methodology, accounting classification, accounting procedure, release time and data quality control. Accumulated quarterly GDP estimation is formed. Not only quarterly GDP estimation by industries is established but also quarterly GDP estimation at expenditure approach is being studied. the following is the quarterly GDP list.

List of China's quarterly Nominal GDP 1992–present (current price, revision based on the 5th economic census 2023, in billions of CNY)
year	quarter 1		quarter 2		quarter 3		quarter 4		sum		
year	GDP	real growth % (YOY)	GDP	real growth % (YOY)	GDP	real growth % (YOY)	GDP	real growth % (YOY)	GDP	growth (%) at current price	real growth (%)
^{p}2025	31,846.64	5.4	34,139.53	5.2	35,410.62	4.8	38,791.13	4.5	140,187.92	4.0	5.0
^{r}2024	30,452.52	5.3	32,858.54	4.7	34,144.32	4.6	37,351.24	5.4	134,806.62	4.2	5.0
2023	29,236.88	4.7	31,623.75	6.5	32,844.07	5.0	35,722.48	5.3	129,427.17	4.9	5.4
2022	27,717.58	4.8	29,911.15	0.8	31,539.96	4.0	34,234.24	3.0	123,402.94	5.1	3.1
2021	25,505.52	18.9	28,797.92	8.1	29,796.19	5.5	33,282.67	4.5	117,382.30	13.4	8.6
2020	20,967.11	-6.8	25,345.00	3.2	26,991.02	4.9	30,183.62	6.5	103,486.76	2.9	2.3
2019	22,145.39	6.4	24,619.39	6.1	25,602.32	6.0	28,220.14	5.9	100,587.24	7.5	6.1
2018	20,573.53	6.9	22,804.24	6.9	23,879.68	6.7	26,343.56	6.5	93,601.01	10.5	6.8
2017	18,527.44	7.0	20,566.56	7.0	21,675.53	6.9	23,968.76	6.8	84,738.29	11.3	6.9
2016	16,573.53	6.8	18,500.22	6.7	19,483.75	6.7	21,561.79	6.8	76,119.30	8.4	6.8
2015	15,417.14	7.1	17,188.70	7.1	18,011.87	7.0	19,633.44	6.9	70,251.15	7.1	7.0
2014	14,353.94	7.6	15,946.24	7.7	16,860.17	7.3	18,417.94	7.4	65,578.29	8.6	7.5
2013	13,187.97	7.9	14,611.39	7.6	15,497.21	7.9	17,069.47	7.7	60,366.04	10.3	7.8
2012	11,937.75	8.1	13,349.12	7.7	14,038.40	7.5	15,425.80	8.1	54,751.06	10.5	7.9
2011	10,621.89	10.1	12,077.68	9.9	12,856.15	9.3	14,015.03	8.7	49,570.76	18.2	9.5
2010	8,912.50	12.2	10,107.50	10.7	10,779.29	9.9	12,126.04	9.9	41,925.33	18.3	10.6
2009	7,534.13	6.4	8,535.56	8.2	9,133.00	10.6	10,249.47	11.9	35,452.16	9.3	9.4
2008	7,060.96	11.6	7,996.50	11.0	8,366.83	9.5	9,007.50	7.1	32,431.78	18.3	9.7
2007	5,808.06	13.6	6,575.10	14.9	7,049.41	14.2	7,985.40	13.9	27,417.97	23.2	14.2
2006	4,783.17	12.4	5,341.53	13.6	5,682.05	12.2	6,451.08	12.5	22,257.84	17.2	12.7
2005	4,107.92	11.2	4,539.98	11.1	4,868.17	10.9	5,474.68	12.4	18,990.75	15.6	11.5
2004	3,510.78	10.6	3,925.18	11.6	4,244.80	9.8	4,742.03	8.8	16,422.80	17.8	10.1
2003	3,028.20	11.2	3,297.82	9.2	3,577.83	10.1	4,033.88	10.1	13,937.73	13.0	10.1
2002	2,666.60	9.0	2,955.07	8.9	3,166.44	9.7	3,543.07	9.2	12,331.19	9.9	9.2
2001	2,439.06	9.5	2,701.78	8.6	2,866.20	8.0	3,208.69	7.5	11,215.73	10.7	8.3
2000	2,156.91	8.8	2,427.71	9.2	2,597.38	8.9	2,948.86	7.6	10,130.86	10.9	8.6
1999	1,955.11	9.0	2,175.13	7.9	2,325.58	7.7	2,682.07	6.8	9,137.89	6.4	7.7
1998	1,820.54	7.3	2,044.97	7.0	2,194.56	7.9	2,526.32	9.2	8,586.39	7.0	7.9
1997	1,680.81	10.2	1,928.08	10.1	2,062.98	8.7	2,350.64	8.6	8,022.50	11.1	9.3
1996	1,472.06	11.0	1,723.97	9.4	1,870.55	9.3	2,154.47	10.3	7,221.06	17.1	10.0
1995	1,218.23	12.0	1,468.52	11.0	1,624.18	10.5	1,854.01	10.8	6,164.94	26.2	11.0
1994	942.41	14.2	1,153.27	13.4	1,292.54	13.1	1,498.01	12.1	4,886.22	36.4	13.1
1993	686.63	15.3	839.04	13.5	942.31	13.0	1,113.99	14.2	3,581.97	31.2	13.9
1992	528.49		650.79		721.84		828.44		2,729.56	23.7	14.3

==== Quarterly GDP by US dollars ====
Quarterly GDP by US dollars
Quarterly GDP by US dollars

List of China's quarterly GDP 1992–present (US dollars) (current price , Revision based on the 5th Economic Census 2023, in billions of US dollars)
year	quarter 1		quarter 2		quarter 3		quarter 4		sum			ExRate
year	GDP	real growth % (YOY)	GDP	real growth % (YOY)	GDP	real growth % (YOY)	GDP	real growth % (YOY)	GDP	growth (%) at current price	real growth (%)	ExRate
^{p}2025	4,458.50	5.4	4,779.51	5.2	4,957.46	4.8	5,430.73	4.5	19,626.19	3.7	5.0	7.1429
^{r}2024	4,276.02	5.3	4,613.86	4.7	4,794.41	4.6	5,244.71	5.4	18,928.99	3.1	5.0	7.1217
2023	4,149.02	4.7	4,487.74	6.5	4,660.92	5.0	5,069.39	5.3	18,367.06	0.1	5.4	7.0467
2022	4,120.90	4.8	4,447.03	0.8	4,689.19	4.0	5,089.76	3.0	18,346.88	0.8	3.1	6.7261
2021	3,953.42	18.9	4,463.76	8.1	4,618.49	5.5	5,158.90	4.5	18,194.57	21.3	8.6	6.4515
2020	3,039.77	-6.8	3,674.47	3.2	3,913.10	4.9	4,375.96	6.5	15,003.30	2.9	2.3	6.8976
2019	3,210.17	6.4	3,568.80	6.1	3,711.29	6.0	4,090.76	5.9	14,581.03	3.1	6.1	6.8985
2018	3,109.01	6.9	3,446.10	6.9	3,608.62	6.7	3,980.95	6.5	14,144.68	12.7	6.8	6.6174
2017	2,744.07	7.0	3,046.09	7.0	3,210.33	6.9	3,549.98	6.8	12,550.47	9.5	6.9	6.7518
2016	2,495.15	6.8	2,785.21	6.7	2,933.28	6.7	3,246.13	6.8	11,459.78	1.6	6.8	6.6423
2015	2,475.30	7.1	2,759.73	7.1	2,891.89	7.0	3,152.24	6.9	11,279.16	5.7	7.0	6.2284
2014	2,336.71	7.6	2,595.92	7.7	2,744.70	7.3	2,998.30	7.4	10,675.63	9.5	7.5	6.1428
2013	2,129.43	7.9	2,359.26	7.6	2,502.29	7.9	2,756.16	7.7	9,747.15	12.4	7.8	6.1932
2012	1,891.13	8.1	2,114.71	7.7	2,223.90	7.5	2,443.69	8.1	8,673.44	13.0	7.9	6.3125
2011	1,644.56	10.1	1,869.96	9.9	1,990.49	9.3	2,169.91	8.7	7,674.92	23.9	9.5	6.4588
2010	1,316.57	12.2	1,493.09	10.7	1,592.33	9.9	1,791.28	9.9	6,193.27	19.3	10.6	6.7695
2009	1,102.93	6.4	1,249.53	8.2	1,336.99	10.6	1,500.43	11.9	5,189.89	11.1	9.4	6.8310
2008	1,016.68	11.6	1,151.39	11.0	1,204.71	9.5	1,296.96	7.1	4,669.74	29.5	9.7	6.9451
2007	763.82	13.6	864.69	14.9	927.07	14.2	1,050.16	13.9	3,605.73	29.1	14.2	7.6040
2006	600.01	12.4	670.05	13.6	712.77	12.2	809.24	12.5	2,792.07	20.4	12.7	7.9718
2005	501.47	11.2	554.22	11.1	594.28	10.9	668.32	12.4	2,318.29	16.8	11.5	8.1917
2004	424.17	10.6	474.24	11.6	512.86	9.8	572.93	8.8	1,984.20	17.8	10.1	8.2768
2003	365.86	11.2	398.43	9.2	432.26	10.1	487.36	10.1	1,683.91	13.0	10.1	8.2770
2002	322.17	9.0	357.02	8.9	382.56	9.7	428.06	9.2	1,489.81	9.9	9.2	8.2770
2001	294.68	9.5	326.42	8.6	346.28	8.0	387.66	7.5	1,355.05	10.7	8.3	8.2770
2000	260.55	8.8	293.26	9.2	313.75	8.9	356.21	7.6	1,223.77	10.9	8.6	8.2784
1999	236.17	9.0	262.75	7.9	280.92	7.7	323.99	6.8	1,103.84	6.4	7.7	8.2783
1998	219.90	7.3	247.00	7.0	265.07	7.9	305.14	9.2	1,037.12	7.2	7.9	8.2791
1997	202.76	10.2	232.58	10.1	248.86	8.7	283.56	8.6	967.76	11.4	9.3	8.2898
1996	177.05	11.0	207.35	9.4	224.98	9.3	259.13	10.3	868.52	17.6	10.0	8.3142
1995	145.88	12.0	175.85	11.0	194.49	10.5	222.01	10.8	738.23	30.2	11.0	8.3510
1994	109.34	14.2	133.81	13.4	149.97	13.1	173.81	12.1	566.93	-8.8	13.1	8.6187
1993	119.17	15.3	145.62	13.5	163.54	13.0	193.33	14.2	621.65	25.6	13.9	5.7620
1992	95.83		118.01		130.90		150.23		494.97	19.4	14.3	5.5146

== Comparative data of three International organizations ==
List of China Nominal GDP by three International organizations ( millions of GDP )
Year	UN (January 2024) (GDP by Expenditure Approach)			WB (March 2024)			IMF (April 16, 2024)		
Year	CNY	USD	ExRate	CNY	USD	ExRate	CNY	USD	ExRate
2022	121,020,720	17,963,171	6.7372	121,020,724	17,963,171	6.7372	120,247,100	17,848,540	6.7371
2021	114,923,700	17,820,459	6.4490	114,923,698	17,820,460	6.4490	114,528,293	17,759,307	6.4489
2020	101,356,700	14,687,744	6.9008	101,356,700	14,687,744	6.9008	102,562,837	14,862,564	6.9007
2019	98,651,500	14,279,966	6.9084	98,651,520	14,279,937	6.9084	99,070,840	14,340,600	6.9084
2018	91,928,110	13,894,907	6.6160	91,928,113	13,894,818	6.6160	91,577,430	13,841,810	6.6160
2017	83,203,590	12,310,490	6.7588	83,203,595	12,310,409	6.7588	82,898,280	12,265,330	6.7587
2016	74,639,510	11,233,315	6.6445	74,639,506	11,233,277	6.6445	74,598,050	11,226,900	6.6446
2015	68,885,820	11,061,573	6.2275	68,885,822	11,061,553	6.2275	69,209,370	11,113,510	6.2275
2014	64,356,310	10,475,625	6.1434	64,356,310	10,475,683	6.1434	64,654,800	10,524,240	6.1434
2013	59,296,320	9,570,470	6.1958	59,296,323	9,570,406	6.1958	59,634,450	9,624,930	6.1958
2012	53,858,000	8,532,186	6.3123	53,857,995	8,532,230	6.3123	53,903,990	8,539,580	6.3123
2011	48,794,020	7,551,546	6.4615	48,794,018	7,551,500	6.4615	48,410,930	7,492,210	6.4615
2010	41,211,930	6,087,192	6.7703	41,211,926	6,087,164	6.7703	40,850,540	6,033,830	6.7703
2009	34,851,770	5,101,690	6.8314	34,851,774	5,101,703	6.8314	34,765,030	5,088,990	6.8314
2008	31,924,460	4,594,337	6.9487	31,924,461	4,594,307	6.9487	31,806,760	4,577,280	6.9488
2007	27,009,230	3,550,327	7.6075	27,009,232	3,550,343	7.6075	27,049,940	3,555,660	7.6076
2006	21,943,850	2,752,119	7.9734	21,943,847	2,752,132	7.9734	21,959,750	2,754,150	7.9733
2005	18,731,890	2,285,961	8.1943	18,731,890	2,285,966	8.1943	18,765,750	2,290,020	8.1946
2004	16,184,020	1,955,347	8.2768	16,184,016	1,955,347	8.2768	16,135,560	1,949,450	8.2770
2003	13,742,200	1,660,280	8.2770	13,742,203	1,660,288	8.2770	13,714,670	1,656,960	8.2770
2002	12,171,740	1,470,557	8.2770	12,171,742	1,470,550	8.2770	12,132,670	1,465,830	8.2770
2001	11,086,310	1,339,401	8.2771	11,086,312	1,339,396	8.2771	11,038,840	1,333,650	8.2772
2000	10,028,010	1,211,331	8.2785	10,028,014	1,211,347	8.2784	9,979,900	1,205,530	8.2784
1999	9,056,440	1,094,004	8.2783	9,056,438	1,093,997	8.2783	9,009,510	1,088,350	8.2781
1998	8,519,550	1,029,061	8.2790	8,519,551	1,029,043	8.2791	8,479,080	1,024,170	8.2790
1997	7,971,500	961,601	8.2898	7,971,504	961,604	8.2898	7,941,580	957,991	8.2898
1996	7,181,360	863,749	8.3142	7,181,363	863,747	8.3142	7,154,150	860,468	8.3143
1995	6,133,990	734,485	8.3514	6,133,989	734,548	8.3507	6,105,040	730,996	8.3517
1994	4,863,750	564,322	8.6187	4,863,745	564,325	8.6187	4,841,030	561,686	8.6187
1993	3,567,320	619,116	5.7620	3,567,323	444,731	8.0213	3,557,600	617,433	5.7619
1992	2,719,450	493,137	5.5146	2,719,453	426,916	6.3700	2,714,030	492,148	5.5147
1991	2,200,560	413,376	5.3234	2,200,563	383,373	5.7400	2,199,720	413,209	5.3235
1990	1,887,290	394,566	4.7832	1,887,287	360,858	5.2300	1,896,930	396,590	4.7831
1989	1,717,970	456,287	3.7651	1,717,974	347,768	4.9400	1,725,050	458,180	3.7650
1988	1,518,040	407,845	3.7221	1,518,039	312,354	4.8600	1,521,050	408,663	3.7220
1987	1,217,460	327,090	3.7221	1,217,459	272,973	4.4600	1,219,800	327,728	3.7220
1986	1,037,620	300,516	3.4528	1,037,615	300,758	3.4500	1,039,030	300,920	3.4528
1985	909,890	309,839	2.9367	909,895	309,488	2.9400	910,808	310,133	2.9368
1984	727,850	313,723	2.3200	727,850	259,947	2.8000	729,014	314,230	2.3200
1983	602,090	304,752	1.9757	602,092	230,687	2.6100	603,423	305,428	1.9757
1982	537,340	283,925	1.8925	537,335	205,090	2.6200	538,632	284,601	1.8926
1981	493,580	289,569	1.7045	493,583	195,866	2.5200	492,160	288,699	1.7048
1980	458,760	306,167	1.4984	458,758	191,149	2.4000	454,052	303,004	1.4985
1979	410,050	263,698	1.5550	410,045	178,281	2.3000			
1978	367,870	218,502	1.6836	367,870	149,541	2.4600			

== See also ==
- Economy of China
- Economic history of China (1949–present)
- List of Chinese provincial-level divisions by GDP per capita
- List of Chinese provincial-level divisions by GDP
- List of top Chinese cities by GDP
- List of top Chinese cities by GDP per capita
- List of prefecture-level divisions of China by GDP
- List of top Chinese counties by GDP
- List of renminbi exchange rates
- List of the largest administrative divisions by GRDP
