= List of Chinese provincial-level divisions by GDP =

The article lists China's first-level administrative divisions by gross domestic product (GDP). Each province's GDP is listed in both the national currency renminbi (CNY), and at nominal U.S. dollar values according to annual average exchange rates. Purchasing power parity (PPP) indicators, measured in international dollars fluctuate frequently, and its relevant data is not included in the main table, only included at the end of the entry. PPP reference comes from the World Economic Outlook published by the International Monetary Fund (IMF). The average CNY exchange rate used here is from the China NBS, and CNY PPP exchange rates are estimated according to the IMF.

>$1 trillion $500 billion - $1.0 trillion $250 - $500 billion <$250 billion

== List ==
List of Chinese provincial-level divisions by nominal GDP in 2025 (preliminary data, at current price) The average exchange rate in 2025 was 1 USD to 7.1429 CNY.
region	GDP(CN¥ mil.)	GDP(US$ mil.)	share (%)	real growth (%)	nominal growth (%)
China (mainland)	140,187,920	19,626,191	100	5.0	3.99
Guangdong	14,584,676	2,041,842	10.40	3.9	2.97
Jiangsu	14,235,150	1,992,909	10.15	5.3	3.90
Shandong	10,319,750	1,444,756	7.36	5.5	4.70
Zhejiang	9,454,500	1,323,622	6.74	5.5	4.90
Sichuan	6,766,534	947,309	4.83	5.5	4.59
Henan	6,663,279	932,853	4.75	5.6	4.79
Hubei	6,266,090	877,247	4.47	5.5	4.41
Fujian	6,019,945	842,787	4.29	5.0	4.22
Shanghai	5,670,871	793,917	4.05	5.4	5.16
Hunan	5,530,865	774,316	3.95	4.8	3.90
Anhui	5,298,900	741,842	3.78	5.5	4.67
Beijing	5,207,300	729,018	3.71	5.4	4.47
Hebei	4,930,520	690,269	3.52	5.6	3.74
Shaanxi	3,655,110	511,712	2.61	5.1	2.85
Jiangxi	3,602,000	504,277	2.57	5.2	5.32
Chongqing	3,375,793	472,608	2.41	5.3	4.86
Liaoning	3,318,290	464,558	2.37	3.7	1.75
Yunnan	3,276,578	458,718	2.34	4.1	3.91
Hong Kong	3,052,473	427,310	2.18	3.5	4.55
Guangxi	2,972,745	416,182	2.12	5.1	3.76
Inner Mongolia	2,671,030	373,942	1.91	4.7	1.50
Shanxi	2,549,568	356,937	1.82	4.0	0.00
Guizhou	2,356,217	329,868	1.68	4.9	3.95
Xinjiang	2,146,200	300,466	1.53	5.5	4.52
Tianjin	1,853,982	259,556	1.32	4.8	2.86
Heilongjiang	1,687,810	236,292	1.20	4.2	2.43
Jilin	1,497,388	209,633	1.07	5.0	4.27
Gansu	1,369,750	191,764	0.98	5.8	5.34
Hainan	810,885	113,523	0.58	4.0	2.18
Ningxia	569,649	79,750	0.41	5.3	3.51
Qinghai	412,184	57,705	0.29	4.1	4.33
Macau	371,624	52,061	0.27	4.7	5.15
Tibet	303,189	42,446	0.22	7.0	9.66

== Historical data (Nominal GDP) ==
=== GDP by national currency (renminbi) in main years ===
GDP in Chinese provincial-level divisions by Chinese yuan (millions) (revision based on the 5th econ-census)
year	2025(p)	2024(r)	2023	2022	2021	2020	2010	2000
China (mainland)	140,187,920	134,806,620	129,427,170	123,402,940	117,382,300	103,486,760	41,925,330	10,130,860
Guangdong	14,584,676	14,148,890	13,790,540	13,254,710	12,757,740	11,370,890	4,682,130	1,095,840
Jiangsu	14,235,150	13,669,690	13,092,430	12,456,420	11,985,320	10,456,660	4,217,520	863,510
Shandong	10,319,750	9,840,690	9,420,640	8,951,940	8,483,800	7,435,590	3,442,940	834,850
Zhejiang	9,454,500	9,000,700	8,561,960	8,077,000	7,676,530	6,716,450	2,790,220	621,890
Sichuan	6,766,534	6,453,790	6,135,340	5,760,940	5,513,130	4,944,510	1,746,670	397,560
Henan	6,663,279	6,355,710	6,062,770	5,880,740	5,780,690	5,416,060	2,256,820	509,730
Hubei	6,266,090	5,964,430	5,679,430	5,344,540	5,009,330	4,301,760	1,648,910	357,740
Fujian	6,019,945	5,747,660	5,480,170	5,209,960	4,960,260	4,368,200	1,523,660	380,460
Shanghai	5,670,871	5,375,950	5,140,450	4,859,450	4,705,940	4,160,390	1,831,960	488,000
Hunan	5,530,865	5,308,470	5,066,750	4,795,790	4,575,190	4,169,370	1,581,490	359,100
Anhui	5,298,900	5,064,670	4,822,750	4,552,510	4,310,280	3,862,880	1,347,460	316,230
Beijing	5,207,300	4,967,020	4,735,370	4,522,240	4,435,070	3,850,360	1,542,020	332,800
Hebei	4,930,520	4,744,810	4,566,000	4,319,830	4,120,540	3,682,150	1,825,410	466,370
Shaanxi	3,655,110	3,543,710	3,397,650	3,303,560	3,047,660	2,629,700	997,300	182,330
Jiangxi	3,602,000	3,422,790	3,267,710	3,156,810	2,983,820	2,582,540	950,340	202,780
Chongqing	3,375,793	3,204,670	3,061,430	2,877,180	2,809,250	2,515,810	818,650	184,140
Liaoning	3,318,290	3,254,080	3,138,980	2,973,970	2,847,100	2,583,900	1,410,580	470,370
Yunnan	3,276,578	3,142,340	3,059,580	2,930,110	2,789,530	2,521,450	786,990	205,230
Hong Kong	3,052,473	2,908,763	2,683,599	2,412,541	2,380,456	2,379,540	1,547,732	1,420,159
Guangxi	2,972,745	2,869,410	2,750,170	2,641,970	2,531,150	2,225,070	871,200	209,670
Inner Mongolia	2,671,030	2,633,700	2,502,050	2,379,570	2,158,480	1,762,340	834,210	155,130
Shanxi	2,549,568	2,535,350	2,605,080	2,565,320	2,308,780	1,820,270	900,450	186,190
Guizhou	2,356,217	2,264,570	2,151,370	2,057,950	1,992,130	1,830,830	458,370	104,040
Xinjiang	2,146,200	2,049,240	1,960,330	1,855,050	1,679,150	1,426,220	542,540	137,410
Tianjin	1,853,982	1,793,130	1,721,180	1,658,850	1,609,320	1,423,080	699,160	160,840
Heilongjiang	1,687,810	1,647,810	1,647,070	1,635,920	1,529,280	1,400,010	843,470	288,190
Jilin	1,497,388	1,430,500	1,394,270	1,312,140	1,343,110	1,249,950	650,590	176,920
Gansu	1,369,750	1,302,050	1,234,570	1,155,360	1,060,800	932,310	398,770	106,140
Hainan	810,885	797,270	759,020	691,280	650,890	564,080	207,370	53,200
Ningxia	569,649	552,020	536,880	516,810	466,650	403,620	159,530	29,770
Qinghai	412,184	396,550	384,920	367,740	344,630	308,060	116,080	26,660
Macau	371,624	352,103	320,838	175,339	197,553	174,287	191,194	
Tibet	303,189	278,910	253,290	223,540	214,510	195,650	52,140	11,890

=== GDP by US dollar in main years ===
GDP in Chinese provincial-level divisions by US dollar (millions) (revision based on the 5th econ-census)
year	2025(p)	2024(r)	2023	2022	2021	2020	2010	2000
CN¥ per US dollar	7.1429	7.1217	7.0467	6.7261	6.4515	6.8976	6.7695	8.2784
China (mainland)	19,626,191	18,928,994	18,367,061	18,346,879	18,194,575	15,003,300	6,193,268	1,223,770
Guangdong	2,041,842	1,986,729	1,957,021	1,970,638	1,977,484	1,648,528	691,651	132,373
Jiangsu	1,992,909	1,919,442	1,857,952	1,851,953	1,857,757	1,515,985	623,018	104,309
Shandong	1,444,756	1,381,789	1,336,887	1,330,926	1,315,012	1,077,997	508,596	100,847
Zhejiang	1,323,622	1,263,841	1,215,031	1,200,844	1,189,883	973,737	412,175	75,122
Sichuan	947,309	906,215	870,669	856,505	854,550	716,845	258,021	48,024
Henan	932,853	892,443	860,370	874,316	896,023	785,209	333,381	61,573
Hubei	877,247	837,501	805,970	794,597	776,460	623,660	243,579	43,214
Fujian	842,787	807,063	777,693	774,589	768,854	633,293	225,077	45,958
Shanghai	793,917	754,869	729,483	722,477	729,433	603,165	270,620	58,949
Hunan	774,316	745,394	719,025	713,012	709,167	604,467	233,620	43,378
Anhui	741,842	711,160	684,398	676,842	668,105	560,032	199,049	38,199
Beijing	729,018	697,449	671,998	672,342	687,448	558,217	227,789	40,201
Hebei	690,269	666,247	647,963	642,249	638,695	533,831	269,652	56,336
Shaanxi	511,712	497,593	482,162	491,155	472,396	381,249	147,323	22,025
Jiangxi	504,277	480,614	463,722	469,337	462,500	374,411	140,386	24,495
Chongqing	472,608	449,987	434,449	427,763	435,441	364,737	120,932	22,243
Liaoning	464,558	456,925	445,454	442,154	441,308	374,609	208,373	56,819
Yunnan	458,718	441,235	434,186	435,633	432,385	365,555	116,255	24,791
Hong Kong	427,310	408,369	380,762	358,674	368,954	344,941	228,639	171,643
Guangxi	416,182	402,911	390,278	392,794	392,335	322,586	128,695	25,327
Inner Mongolia	373,942	369,813	355,067	353,782	334,570	255,500	123,231	18,739
Shanxi	356,937	356,003	369,688	381,398	357,867	263,899	133,016	22,491
Guizhou	329,868	317,982	305,302	305,965	308,786	265,430	67,711	12,568
Xinjiang	300,466	287,746	278,191	275,799	260,273	206,770	80,145	16,599
Tianjin	259,556	251,784	244,253	246,629	249,449	206,315	103,281	19,429
Heilongjiang	236,292	231,379	233,736	243,220	237,043	202,971	124,599	34,812
Jilin	209,633	200,865	197,861	195,082	208,186	181,215	96,106	21,371
Gansu	191,764	182,829	175,198	171,773	164,427	135,164	58,907	12,821
Hainan	113,523	111,949	107,713	102,776	100,890	81,779	30,633	6,426
Ningxia	79,750	77,512	76,189	76,837	72,332	58,516	23,566	3,596
Qinghai	57,705	55,682	54,624	54,674	53,419	44,662	17,147	3,220
Macau	52,061	49,467	45,627	24,930	30,634	25,280	28,244	
Tibet	42,446	39,163	35,944	33,235	33,250	28,365	7,702	1,436

=== GDP by PPP intl dollar in main years ===
GDP in Chinese provincial-level divisions by purchasing power parity (intl dollar, millions) reference only here for the frequent changes in the ppp indicator (based on the WEO published in April 2026 by IMF and revision based on the 5th econ-census)
year	2025(p)	2024(r)	2023	2022	2021	2020	2010	2000
CN¥ per intl dollar	3.3992	3.5311	3.6451	3.7959	3.9874	4.0147	3.7026	3.0262
China (mainland)	41,241,445	38,176,948	35,507,166	32,509,534	29,438,306	25,776,960	11,323,213	3,347,717
Guangdong	4,290,620	4,006,936	3,783,309	3,491,849	3,199,513	2,832,314	1,264,552	362,118
Jiangsu	4,187,794	3,871,227	3,591,789	3,281,546	3,005,798	2,604,593	1,139,070	285,345
Shandong	3,035,935	2,786,862	2,584,467	2,358,318	2,127,652	1,852,091	929,871	275,874
Zhejiang	2,781,390	2,548,979	2,348,896	2,127,822	1,925,197	1,672,964	753,584	205,502
Sichuan	1,990,625	1,827,700	1,683,175	1,517,674	1,382,638	1,231,601	471,741	131,373
Henan	1,960,249	1,799,924	1,663,266	1,549,235	1,449,739	1,349,057	609,523	168,439
Hubei	1,843,401	1,689,114	1,558,100	1,407,977	1,256,290	1,071,502	445,338	118,214
Fujian	1,770,989	1,627,725	1,503,435	1,372,523	1,243,984	1,088,051	411,511	125,722
Shanghai	1,668,296	1,522,458	1,410,236	1,280,184	1,180,203	1,036,289	494,777	161,258
Hunan	1,627,108	1,503,347	1,390,017	1,263,413	1,147,412	1,038,526	427,130	118,664
Anhui	1,558,867	1,434,304	1,323,078	1,199,323	1,080,975	962,184	363,923	104,497
Beijing	1,531,919	1,406,649	1,299,106	1,191,349	1,112,271	959,065	416,470	109,973
Hebei	1,450,494	1,343,720	1,252,641	1,138,025	1,033,390	917,167	493,008	154,111
Shaanxi	1,075,285	1,003,571	932,114	870,297	764,323	655,018	269,351	60,250
Jiangxi	1,059,661	969,327	896,466	831,637	748,312	643,271	256,668	67,008
Chongqing	993,114	907,556	839,875	757,970	704,532	626,650	221,101	60,849
Liaoning	976,197	921,549	861,151	783,469	714,024	643,610	380,970	155,433
Yunnan	963,926	889,904	839,368	771,914	699,586	628,054	212,551	67,818
Guangxi	874,543	812,611	754,484	696,006	634,787	554,231	235,294	69,285
Inner Mongolia	785,782	745,858	686,415	626,879	541,325	438,972	225,304	51,262
Shanxi	750,049	718,006	714,680	675,813	579,019	453,401	243,194	61,526
Guizhou	693,168	641,321	590,209	542,151	499,606	456,032	123,797	34,380
Xinjiang	631,384	580,340	537,799	488,698	421,114	355,249	146,529	45,407
Hong Kong	603,291	566,878	538,974	503,870	488,412	435,301	320,216	174,313
Tianjin	545,417	507,811	472,190	437,011	403,601	354,467	188,829	53,149
Heilongjiang	496,532	466,656	451,859	430,970	383,528	348,721	227,805	95,232
Jilin	440,512	405,115	382,505	345,673	336,839	311,343	175,712	58,463
Gansu	402,962	368,738	338,693	304,371	266,038	232,224	107,700	35,074
Hainan	238,552	225,785	208,230	182,112	163,237	140,504	56,007	17,580
Ningxia	167,583	156,331	147,288	136,150	117,031	100,536	43,086	9,837
Qinghai	121,259	112,302	105,599	96,878	86,430	76,733	31,351	8,810
Macau	94,022	87,348	79,029	43,472	50,078	39,121	57,013	
Tibet	89,194	78,987	69,488	58,890	53,797	48,733	14,082	3,929

== See also ==
- Economy of China
- Historical GDP of China
- List of Chinese provincial-level divisions by GDP per capita
- List of prefecture-level divisions of China by GDP
- List of top Chinese counties by GDP
- List of top Chinese cities by GDP
- List of top Chinese cities by GDP per capita
- List of renminbi exchange rates

香港与澳门两个特别行政区基于当地货币、美元与购买力平价的GDP指标出自IMF数据，折算为人民币指标以本币和当年平均汇率计算
GDP data for the two special administrative regions of Hong Kong and Macau (in local currency, USD, PPP) from IMF (April 2026 World Economic Outlook). CNY equivalents calculated by converting local currency GDP using annual average exchange rates (1 CNY = ? local currency)
year		2025	2024	2023	2022	2021	2020	2010	2000
Average exchange rate	HK$ per Chinese yuan	1.0915	1.0956	1.1109	1.1643	1.2048	1.1245	1.1477	0.9418
Average exchange rate	MOP$ per Chinese yuan	1.1249	1.1291	1.1467	1.1467	1.2414	1.1588	1.1821	0.9701
GDP (local currency)	Hong Kong (HK$ millions)	3,331,774	3,186,841	2,981,210	2,808,922	2,867,973	2,675,793	1,776,332	1,337,501
GDP (local currency)	Macau (MOP$ millions)	418,039	397,560	367,905	201,061	245,242	201,964	226,016	
‌GDP (CNY‌)	Hongkong (millions)	3,052,473	2,908,763	2,683,599	2,412,541	2,380,456	2,379,540	1,547,732	1,420,159
‌GDP (CNY‌)	Macau (millions)	371,623	352,103	320,838	175,339	197,553	174,287	191,194	
GDP per capita (local currency)	Hong Kong (HK$)	443,598	424,878	396,021	375,896	387,485	360,294	251,887	199,285
GDP per capita (local currency)	Macau (MOP$)	597,944	577,597	538,109	298,842	358,961	295,658	409,227	
‌GDP per capita (CNY‌)	Hongkong	406,411	387,804	356,487	322,852	321,618	320,403	219,471	211,601
‌GDP per capita (CNY‌)	Macau	531,553	511,555	469,267	260,611	289,158	255,142	346,177	
