= List of Chinese counties by GDP =

This list ranks China's county-level administrative divisions (excluding districts) by economic scale, using 2024 data as reference due to typical delays of 6 months in official statistical releases and 1-year lags in statistical yearbook publications. The inclusion threshold is set at $10 billion GDP with data sourced from official statistical yearbooks and communiques. GDP per capita calculations adopt China's standard mid-year population denominator. The annual average exchange rate of RMB to USD is based on the officially published annual average exchange rate, published by China NBS in National Data. The purchasing power parity indicator is referenced from the IMF World Economic Outlook. The 2024 IMF purchasing power parity indicator is referenced from the April 2026 World Economic Outlook.

== Distribution characteristics ==
Mainland China has 31 provincial-level administrative divisions. Excluding the 4 municipalities, there are 27 provinces (including 4 autonomous regions). In 2024, a total of 132 counties (including county-level city and banner, the same below) in China had a GDP exceeding 10 billion US dollars, distributed across 19 provinces. Among them, the four coastal provinces with the most developed county economies - Jiangsu, Zhejiang, Shandong, and Fujian - accounted for 82 such counties. The four central provinces of Hubei, Henan, Anhui, and Hunan had 24, while Sichuan, a western province, had 5. The remaining 10 provinces had a combined 21, and 8 provinces had no counties with a GDP exceeding 10 billion US dollars.

As of 2024, there are 63 counties in China with a GDP exceeding 100 billion yuan (US$14.042 billion). Among these high-economic-volume counties, Jiangsu Province leads with 22 entries, accounting for 34.9% of the total number. Zhejiang Province follows with 11 such counties, making up 17.5%. Shandong and Fujian each have 6 counties on the list, while Hunan and Henan each contribute 3. These figures reflect the uneven distribution of county-level economic strength in China, with the eastern coastal regions demonstrating prominent advantages in cultivating high-GDP county entities.

Jiangsu, the second-largest provincial economy in China, has 95 county-level administrative regions, including 40 counties (19 counties and 21 county-level cities). Of the 40 counties in the province, 32, or 80%, have a GDP exceeding US$10 billion, and Jiangsu accounts for 4 of the top 5 counties in terms of GDP. As of 2024, Zhejiang, the fourth-largest provincial economy in China, has a total of 53 counties. 23 of these counties achieved a GDP of over US$10 billion, among which 11 counties exceeded CN¥100 billion. Shandong, the third-largest provincial economy, administers 78 counties. 16 of its counties recorded a GDP of over US$10 billion, with 6 of them surpassing CN¥100 billion. Fujian, the eighth-largest provincial economy, has 53 counties. In 2024, 11 of its counties had a GDP exceeding US$10 billion, and 6 of them topped CN¥100 billion.

Guangdong, known as China's leading economic province (GDP US$1.99 trillion in 2024), has 122 county-level administrative divisions, including 57 counties. However, only 4 of them have a GDP exceeding 10 billion US dollars, as its economic center is entirely concentrated in the Pearl River Delta. Notably, none of the 63 counties in China with a GDP exceeding 100 billion Chinese yuan is from Guangdong, indicating that the development level of its county economy is far lower than people's expectations. In addition, the GDP per capita of all four of Guangdong's largest county-level economies even falls below the provincial average (US$15,607).

== 2024 List ==
List of Chinese county-level divisions by nominal GDP
average exchange rate in 2024: CNY 7.1217 per U.S. dollar & CNY 3.5311 per Intl. dollar
counties		provinces	GDP (million)			GDP per capita			mid-yr pop. (thou.)
English	Chinese	provinces	CNY	USD	(Intl.$)	CNY	USD	(Intl.$)	mid-yr pop. (thou.)
Kunshan City	昆山市	Jiangsu	538,017	75,546	152,365	249,793	35,075	70,741	2,154
Jiangyin City	江阴市	Jiangsu	512,613	71,979	145,171	287,017	40,302	81,283	1,786
Jinjiang City	晋江市	Fujian	364,745	51,216	103,295	174,896	24,558	49,530	2,085
Zhangjiagang City	张家港市	Jiangsu	337,629	47,408	95,616	234,505	32,928	66,411	1,440
Changshu City	常熟市	Jiangsu	307,910	43,235	87,199	183,067	25,706	51,844	1,682
Cixi City	慈溪市	Zhejiang	292,864	41,123	82,938	155,738	21,868	44,105	1,880
Yiwu City	义乌市	Zhejiang	250,351	35,153	70,899	131,040	18,400	37,110	1,910
Shenmu City	神木市	Shaanxi	250,261	35,141	70,873	430,039	60,384	121,786	582
Yixing City	宜兴市	Jiangsu	245,502	34,472	69,526	191,380	26,873	54,198	1,283
Changsha County	长沙县	Hunan	226,635	31,823	64,183	156,961	22,040	44,451	1,444
Xinzheng City	新郑市	Henan	197,187	27,688	55,843	123,358	17,321	34,935	1,598
Renhuai City	仁怀市	Guizhou	197,018	27,664	55,795	300,059	42,133	84,976	657
Fuqing City	福清市	Fujian	190,079	26,690	53,830	134,284	18,856	38,029	1,415
Taicang City	太仓市	Jiangsu	188,006	26,399	53,243	221,836	31,149	62,823	847
Zhuji City	诸暨市	Zhejiang	186,108	26,133	52,705	150,878	21,186	42,728	1,234
Yueqing City	乐清市	Zhejiang	185,850	26,096	52,632	125,532	17,627	35,550	1,481
Nan'an City	南安市	Fujian	184,420	25,896	52,227	120,575	16,931	34,147	1,530
Liuyang City	浏阳市	Hunan	180,026	25,279	50,983	124,680	17,507	35,309	1,444
Hui'an County	惠安县	Fujian	174,803	24,545	49,504	166,797	23,421	47,237	1,048
Jiaozhou City	胶州市	Shandong	172,800	24,264	48,937	165,268	23,206	46,804	1,046
Liyang City	溧阳市	Jiangsu	170,839	23,989	48,381	211,775	29,737	59,974	807
Yuyao City	余姚市	Zhejiang	168,278	23,629	47,656	132,921	18,664	37,643	1,266
Longkou City	龙口市	Shandong	164,250	23,063	46,515	226,336	31,781	64,098	726
Rugao City	如皋市	Jiangsu	161,543	22,683	45,749	132,581	18,616	37,547	1,218
Jungar Banner	准格尔旗	Inner Mongolia	160,037	22,472	45,322	436,483	61,289	123,611	367
Danyang City	丹阳市	Jiangsu	156,109	21,920	44,210	157,004	22,046	44,463	994
Shuyang County	沭阳县	Jiangsu	156,039	21,910	44,190	93,954	13,193	26,608	1,661
Qidong City	启东市	Jiangsu	151,465	21,268	42,895	158,553	22,263	44,902	955
Hai'an City	海安市	Jiangsu	150,698	21,160	42,677	174,077	24,443	49,298	866
Taixing City	泰兴市	Jiangsu	146,754	20,607	41,560	148,755	20,888	42,127	987
Rui'an City	瑞安市	Zhejiang	145,198	20,388	41,120	94,285	13,239	26,701	1,540
Rudong County	如东县	Jiangsu	143,046	20,086	40,510	163,612	22,974	46,335	874
Wenling City	温岭市	Zhejiang	141,763	19,906	40,147	97,802	13,733	27,697	1,449
Ningxiang City	宁乡市	Hunan	141,623	19,886	40,107	110,204	15,474	31,210	1,285
Jingjiang City	靖江市	Jiangsu	140,395	19,714	39,760	212,510	29,840	60,182	661
Nanchang County	南昌县	Jiangxi	140,144	19,678	39,688	111,918	15,715	31,695	1,252
Haining City	海宁市	Zhejiang	139,716	19,618	39,567	126,097	17,706	35,710	1,108
Pizhou City	邳州市	Jiangsu	135,489	19,025	38,370	94,777	13,308	26,841	1,430
Tongxiang City	桐乡市	Zhejiang	134,711	18,916	38,150	126,847	17,811	35,923	1,062
Qian'an City	迁安市	Hebei	134,406	18,873	38,063	172,294	24,193	48,793	780
Ejin Horo Banner	伊金霍洛旗	Inner Mongolia	131,040	18,400	37,110	508,893	71,457	144,117	258
Shishi City	石狮市	Fujian	130,236	18,287	36,883	185,521	26,050	52,539	702
Zhongmu County	中牟县	Henan	125,237	17,585	35,467	85,658	12,028	24,258	1,462
Xinghua City	兴化市	Jiangsu	124,038	17,417	35,127	111,103	15,601	31,464	1,116
Wafangdian City	瓦房店市	Liaoning	123,580	17,353	34,998	141,558	19,877	40,089	873
Feixi County	肥西县	Anhui	121,243	17,024	34,336	120,043	16,856	33,996	1,010
Dongtai City	东台市	Jiangsu	119,094	16,723	33,727	134,592	18,899	38,116	885
Minhou County	闽侯县	Fujian	117,050	16,436	33,148	113,586	15,949	32,167	1,030
Pei County	沛县	Jiangsu	112,609	15,812	31,891	110,083	15,457	31,175	1,023
Xiantao City	仙桃市	Hubei	112,513	15,799	31,864	103,470	14,529	29,302	1,087
Gaoyou City	高邮市	Jiangsu	110,709	15,545	31,353	155,030	21,769	43,904	714
Zoucheng City	邹城市	Shandong	110,370	15,498	31,257	97,105	13,635	27,500	1,137
Korla City	库尔勒市	Xinjiang	110,254	15,481	31,224	141,469	19,865	40,064	779
Yizheng City	仪征市	Jiangsu	109,388	15,360	30,978	203,149	28,525	57,531	538
Shouguang City	寿光市	Shandong	108,190	15,192	30,639	95,143	13,360	26,944	1,178
Pinghu City	平湖市	Zhejiang	107,827	15,141	30,536	155,259	21,801	43,969	695
Rongcheng City	荣成市	Shandong	106,960	15,019	30,291	150,510	21,134	42,624	711
Ninghai County	宁海县	Zhejiang	106,804	14,997	30,247	150,111	21,078	42,511	712
Fugu County	府谷县	Shaanxi	106,670	14,978	30,209	417,822	58,669	118,326	255
Gongyi City	巩义市	Henan	105,127	14,762	29,772	131,343	18,443	37,196	800
Tengzhou City	滕州市	Shandong	103,930	14,593	29,433	67,190	9,435	19,028	1,547
Changfeng County	长丰县	Anhui	103,864	14,584	29,414	124,017	17,414	35,121	837
Xinyi City	新沂市	Jiangsu	102,664	14,416	29,074	107,586	15,107	30,468	954
Anxi County	安溪县	Fujian	98,920	13,890	28,014	99,819	14,016	28,269	991
Baoying County	宝应县	Jiangsu	98,087	13,773	27,778	144,777	20,329	41,001	678
Linhai City	临海市	Zhejiang	97,168	13,644	27,518	87,539	12,292	24,791	1,110
Feicheng City	肥城市	Shandong	96,560	13,559	27,346	111,895	15,712	31,688	863
Yidu City	宜都市	Hubei	96,304	13,523	27,273	268,704	37,730	76,096	358
Jiashan County	嘉善县	Zhejiang	95,829	13,456	27,139	143,887	20,204	40,748	666
Liling City	醴陵市	Hunan	95,256	13,375	26,976	109,831	15,422	31,104	867
Boluo County	博罗县	Guangdong	95,224	13,371	26,967	78,318	10,997	22,179	1,216
Qianjiang City	潜江市	Hubei	95,197	13,367	26,960	113,831	15,984	32,237	836
Guangrao County	广饶县	Shandong	95,160	13,362	26,949	181,724	25,517	51,464	524
Pingdu City	平度市	Shandong	95,010	13,341	26,907	80,849	11,353	22,896	1,175
Xiangshan County	象山县	Zhejiang	94,299	13,241	26,705	163,146	22,908	46,203	578
Hanchuan City	汉川市	Hubei	94,005	13,200	26,622	106,793	14,995	30,244	880
Daye City	大冶市	Hubei	93,071	13,069	26,358	107,928	15,155	30,565	862
Changxing County	长兴县	Zhejiang	92,775	13,027	26,274	135,438	19,018	38,356	685
Feidong County	肥东县	Anhui	92,251	12,954	26,125	101,097	14,196	28,630	912
Fu'an City	福安市	Fujian	91,870	12,900	26,017	153,758	21,590	43,544	597
Zhaoyuan City	招远市	Shandong	91,630	12,866	25,949	173,017	24,294	48,998	530
Lingwu City	灵武市	Ningxia	91,080	12,789	25,794	307,704	43,207	87,141	296
Huanghua City	黄骅市	Hebei	90,886	12,762	25,739	140,745	19,763	39,859	650
Zhucheng City	诸城市	Shandong	90,130	12,656	25,525	84,872	11,917	24,036	1,062
Zhijiang City	枝江市	Hubei	90,072	12,647	25,508	210,055	29,495	59,487	429
Laizhou City	莱州市	Shandong	88,750	12,462	25,134	109,982	15,443	31,147	807
Dongyang City	东阳市	Zhejiang	87,514	12,288	24,784	79,995	11,233	22,654	1,094
Zaoyang City	枣阳市	Hubei	87,458	12,281	24,768	98,340	13,809	27,850	889
Jianyang City	简阳市	Sichuan	86,282	12,115	24,435	76,474	10,738	21,657	1,128
Lianjiang County	连江县	Fujian	84,997	11,935	24,071	131,473	18,461	37,233	646
Yongkang City	永康市	Zhejiang	83,553	11,732	23,662	85,432	11,996	24,194	978
Wu'an City	武安市	Hebei	83,045	11,661	23,518	101,095	14,195	28,630	820
Huidong County	惠东县	Guangdong	82,851	11,634	23,463	80,716	11,334	22,859	1,026
Jurong City	句容市	Jiangsu	81,504	11,444	23,082	126,745	17,797	35,894	643
Sihui City	四会市	Guangdong	81,424	11,433	23,059	122,672	17,225	34,740	664
Xichang City	西昌市	Sichuan	80,343	11,281	22,753	82,743	11,618	23,433	971
Lianshui County	涟水县	Jiangsu	80,195	11,261	22,711	99,038	13,907	28,047	810
Qingzhou City	青州市	Shandong	80,140	11,253	22,695	83,536	11,730	23,657	959
Donghai County	东海县	Jiangsu	80,081	11,245	22,679	77,198	10,840	21,862	1,037
Shengzhou City	嵊州市	Zhejiang	80,025	11,237	22,663	114,896	16,133	32,538	696
Yuhuan City	玉环市	Zhejiang	79,506	11,164	22,516	123,648	17,362	35,017	643
Daishan County	岱山县	Zhejiang	79,351	11,142	22,472	370,798	52,066	105,009	214
Shaodong City	邵东市	Hunan	79,154	11,114	22,416	80,622	11,321	22,832	982
Siyang County	泗阳县	Jiangsu	78,756	11,059	22,304	94,858	13,320	26,864	830
Tianmen City	天门市	Hubei	78,540	11,028	22,242	72,128	10,128	20,426	1,089
Yuzhou City	禹州市	Henan	78,331	10,999	22,183	70,843	9,947	20,063	1,106
Sheyang County	射阳县	Jiangsu	78,113	10,968	22,121	103,386	14,517	29,279	756
Jianhu County	建湖县	Jiangsu	77,982	10,950	22,084	128,630	18,062	36,428	606
Funing County	阜宁县	Jiangsu	77,817	10,927	22,038	98,646	13,851	27,936	789
Pingyang County	平阳县	Zhejiang	77,746	10,917	22,018	88,954	12,491	25,192	874
Tianchang City	天长市	Anhui	77,723	10,914	22,011	126,791	17,803	35,907	613
Yongcheng City	永城市	Henan	77,525	10,886	21,955	61,550	8,643	17,431	1,260
Suining County	睢宁县	Jiangsu	77,245	10,846	21,876	72,283	10,150	20,470	1,069
Gaozhou City	高州市	Guangdong	77,120	10,829	21,840	60,762	8,532	17,208	1,269
Zhangpu County	漳浦县	Fujian	77,013	10,814	21,810	90,195	12,665	25,543	854
Sihong County	泗洪县	Jiangsu	76,823	10,787	21,756	89,319	12,542	25,295	860
Anning City	安宁市	Yunnan	75,959	10,666	21,511	149,128	20,940	42,233	509
Xuanhan County	宣汉县	Sichuan	75,166	10,555	21,287	79,625	11,181	22,550	944
Xianyou County	仙游县	Fujian	74,881	10,514	21,206	83,294	11,696	23,589	899
Panzhou City	盘州市	Guizhou	73,456	10,314	20,803	68,325	9,594	19,349	1,075
Lujiang County	庐江县	Anhui	73,111	10,266	20,705	82,565	11,593	23,382	885
Huantai County	桓台县	Shandong	73,030	10,255	20,682	150,779	21,172	42,700	484
Fengcheng City	丰城市	Jiangxi	73,002	10,251	20,674	71,218	10,000	20,169	1,025
Haicheng City	海城市	Liaoning	72,660	10,203	20,577	71,221	10,001	20,170	1,020
Linzhou City	林州市	Henan	72,653	10,202	20,575	78,429	11,013	22,211	926
Haiyan County	海盐县	Zhejiang	72,537	10,185	20,542	153,031	21,488	43,338	474
Deqing County	德清县	Zhejiang	72,254	10,146	20,462	129,256	18,150	36,605	559
Jimsar County	吉木萨尔县	Xinjiang	72,104	10,125	20,420	413,203	58,020	117,018	175
Zouping City	邹平市	Shandong	72,080	10,121	20,413	94,259	13,235	26,694	765
Jiangyou City	江油市	Sichuan	71,691	10,067	20,303	97,725	13,722	27,676	734
Gaomi City	高密市	Shandong	71,570	10,050	20,268	82,501	11,585	23,364	868
Pengzhou County	彭州市	Sichuan	71,458	10,034	20,237	91,560	12,856	25,930	780

== See also ==
- List of Chinese provincial-level divisions by GDP per capita
- List of Chinese provincial-level divisions by GDP
- List of top Chinese cities by GDP
- List of top Chinese cities by GDP per capita
- List of prefecture-level divisions of China by GDP
- List of renminbi exchange rates
- List of the largest administrative divisions by GRDP
