= List of Chinese provincial-level divisions by GDP per capita =

The article is about China's first-level administrative divisions by their gross domestic product per capita for selected years. All figures are given in the national currency, renminbi (CNY) and in USD, at nominal values. Purchasing power parity (PPP) indicators, which are measured in international dollars and fluctuate frequently, and PPP data is not included in the main table, only included at the end of the entry. Purchasing power parity reference comes from the World Economic Outlook published by the International Monetary Fund (IMF). The average CNY exchange rate used here is from China NBS, and CNY PPP exchange rates are estimated according to the IMF.

Unless otherwise specified, GDP per capita is based on the annual average population. The annual average population, also referred to as the mid-year population, is calculated as the average of the resident populations at the end of two consecutive years.

Since the implementation of reform and opening-up in mainland China in 1978, its economy has developed rapidly. In 1995, the GDP per capita of Beijing, Tianjin, and Shanghai exceeded US$1,000; by 2000, 10 provinces had GDP per capita above US$1,000, of which Beijing, Tianjin, and Shanghai exceeded US$2,000. Per capita GDP surpassed US$10,000 for the first time in Beijing (US$10,402) and Shanghai (US$10,593) in 2009. Mainland China's per capita GDP (US$10,083) exceeded US$10,000 for the first time in 2018, and 11 provinces—including Beijing, Shanghai, Jiangsu, Tianjin, Fujian, Zhejiang, Guangdong, Hubei, Chongqing, Shandong and Inner Mongolia—had per capita GDP above US$10,000, with Beijing and Shanghai exceeding US$20,000 per capita in the same year. As of 2025, 22 provincial-level divisions in mainland China have a nominal GDP per capita above US$10,000, while 9 — including Yunnan, Qinghai, and Gansu — remain below this threshold. Beijing and Shanghai exceed US$30,000, and Jiangsu and Fujian have surpassed US$20,000.

Apart from the national capital, Beijing, and the financial capital, Shanghai, coastal provinces lead China's per capita GDP rankings, as they are most heavily exposed to export-oriented industrialization. The seaports in these provinces provide greater exposure to international trade and allow both local and foreign companies, which receive foreign direct investment (FDI) in China, to export goods and access global markets more efficiently.

For comparison purposes, this article also presents the GDP of the Hong Kong and Macau Special Administrative Regions (SARs), which maintain separate economic systems and currencies. Likewise, GDP indicators for the two SARs are presented in local currency, U.S. dollars, and at purchasing power parity, with PPP data sourced from the IMF.

== 2025 map ==
Map of Chinese provinces and SARs by GDP per capita in US$:
＜$10,000 $10,000 - $15,000 $15,000 - $20,000 $20,000 - $30,000 $30,000 - $50,000 ≧$50,000

== 2025 data ==
List of 31 provincial-level administrative divisions in mainland China by nominal GDP per capita of 2025 (current price, based on mid-yr pop.)
preliminary budget data average exchange rate in 2025:CNY 7.1429 per U.S. dollar, CNY 3.3992 per intl.dollar
provinces	GDP per capita			reference index		
provinces	CNY	USD	intl.$ (ppp)	share (%)	CNY mil. of GDP	thousands of mid-yr pop.
China (mainland)	99,665	13,953	29,322	100	140,187,920	1,406,585.0
Macau	531,553	74,465	134,485	541	371,623	688.6
Hong Kong	406,411	56,893	80,323	408	3,052,473	7,498.9
Beijing	238,705	33,418	70,224	240	5,207,340	21,815.0
Shanghai	228,403	31,976	67,193	229	5,670,871	24,828.4
Jiangsu	167,040	23,385	49,141	168	14,235,150	85,220.0
Fujian	143,623	20,107	42,252	144	6,019,945	41,915.0
Zhejiang	141,418	19,798	41,603	142	9,454,500	66,855.0
Tianjin	135,972	19,036	40,001	136	1,853,982	13,635.0
Guangdong	113,769	15,928	33,469	114	14,584,676	128,195.0
Inner Mongolia	112,181	15,705	33,002	113	2,671,030	23,810.0
Hubei	107,619	15,067	31,660	108	6,266,090	58,225.0
Chongqing	105,862	14,821	31,143	106	3,375,793	31,888.7
Shandong	102,566	14,359	30,174	103	10,319,750	100,615.9
Shaanxi	92,663	12,973	27,260	93	3,655,110	39,445.0
Anhui	86,832	12,156	25,545	87	5,298,900	61,025.0
Hunan	84,888	11,884	24,973	85	5,530,870	65,155.0
Xinjiang	81,577	11,421	23,999	82	2,146,214	26,309.0
Tibet	81,502	11,410	23,977	82	303,189	3,720.0
Sichuan	81,124	11,357	23,866	81	6,766,530	83,410.0
Jiangxi	80,258	11,236	23,611	81	3,602,000	44,880.0
Liaoning	80,094	11,213	23,563	80	3,318,290	41,430.0
Ningxia	77,981	10,917	22,941	78	569,649	7,305.0
Hainan	77,117	10,796	22,687	77	810,885	10,515.0
Shanxi	74,224	10,391	21,836	74	2,549,568	34,349.9
Yunnan	70,472	9,866	20,732	71	3,276,578	46,495.0
Qinghai	69,567	9,739	20,466	70	412,184	5,925.0
Henan	68,201	9,548	20,064	68	6,663,279	97,700.0
Hebei	66,936	9,371	19,692	67	4,930,520	73,660.0
Jilin	64,906	9,087	19,094	65	1,497,388	23,070.0
Guizhou	61,066	8,549	17,965	61	2,356,217	38,585.0
Guangxi	59,384	8,314	17,470	60	2,972,749	50,060.0
Heilongjiang	55,980	7,837	16,469	56	1,687,800	30,150.0
Gansu	55,897	7,825	16,444	56	1,369,750	24,505.0

== Main Year (Nominal GDP per capita) ==
=== GDPpc by national currency (renminbi) in main years ===
GDP per capita in Chinese provincial-level divisions by Chinese yuan (renminbi) (revision based on the 5th econ-census)
year	2025(p)	2024(r)	2023	2022	2021	2020	2010	2000
China (mainland)	99,665	95,677	91,746	87,385	83,111	73,338	31,341	8,024
Macau	531,553	511,555	469,267	260,611	289,158	255,142	346,177	
Hongkong	406,411	387,804	356,487	322,852	321,618	320,403	219,471	211,601
Beijing	238,705	228,167	216,722	206,826	202,607	175,856	80,692	25,405
Shanghai	228,403	217,140	207,193	195,788	189,107	167,454	81,186	30,730
Jiangsu	167,040	160,694	153,658	146,374	141,153	123,411	53,798	11,878
Fujian	143,623	137,920	130,932	124,417	118,837	105,283	41,409	11,313
Zhejiang	141,418	135,565	129,687	123,153	118,028	104,593	52,047	13,585
Tianjin	135,972	132,143	126,232	121,261	116,618	102,675	55,335	16,412
Guangdong	113,769	111,146	108,745	104,611	100,820	90,558	45,521	12,993
Inner Mongolia	112,181	110,011	104,317	99,128	89,880	73,156	33,842	6,554
Hubei	107,619	102,832	97,234	91,563	86,554	73,711	28,818	6,176
Chongqing	105,862	100,903	95,610	89,562	87,502	78,656	28,505	6,451
Shandong	102,566	97,575	92,878	88,053	83,440	73,362	36,148	9,338
Shaanxi	92,663	89,915	85,929	83,529	77,068	66,583	26,730	5,022
Anhui	86,832	82,694	78,752	74,387	70,556	63,341	22,294	5,284
Hunan	84,888	81,225	76,932	72,521	68,971	62,768	24,376	5,485
Xinjiang	81,577	78,660	75,616	71,679	64,845	55,398	25,001	7,429
Tibet	81,502	75,237	69,489	61,244	58,609	53,825	17,497	4,607
Sichuan	81,124	77,333	73,293	68,804	65,856	59,138	21,524	4,886
Jiangxi	80,258	75,862	72,271	69,802	66,043	57,167	21,370	4,840
Liaoning	80,094	78,236	74,925	70,590	67,117	60,570	32,368	11,259
Ningxia	77,981	75,484	73,696	71,137	64,543	56,136	25,363	5,428
Hainan	77,117	75,903	73,335	67,541	64,063	56,211	23,932	6,864
Shanxi	74,224	73,769	74,999	73,705	66,249	52,105	25,722	5,772
Yunnan	70,472	67,612	65,334	62,456	59,276	53,443	17,160	4,867
Qinghai	69,567	66,568	64,747	61,857	58,067	52,081	20,728	5,191
Henan	68,201	64,888	61,592	59,537	58,320	54,592	23,892	5,401
Hebei	66,936	64,352	61,649	58,109	55,265	49,388	25,659	7,019
Jilin	64,906	61,689	59,495	55,564	56,268	51,576	23,714	6,679
Guizhou	61,066	58,685	55,728	53,398	51,677	47,517	13,066	2,787
Guangxi	59,384	57,071	54,599	52,399	50,341	44,497	18,407	4,431
Heilongjiang	55,980	54,102	53,468	52,568	48,579	43,573	22,026	7,585
Gansu	55,897	52,825	49,811	46,381	42,508	37,218	15,592	4,197

=== GDPpc by US dollar in main years ===
GDP per capita in Chinese provincial-level divisions by US dollar (revision based on the 5th econ-census)
year	2025(p)	2024(r)	2023	2022	2021	2020	2010	2000
CN¥ per US dollar	7.1429	7.1217	7.0467	6.7261	6.4515	6.8976	6.7695	8.2784
China (mainland)	13,953	13,435	13,020	12,992	12,882	10,632	4,630	969
Macau	74,465	71,869	66,735	37,053	44,839	37,008	51,139	
Hongkong	56,893	54,445	50,580	47,998	49,849	46,446	32,421	25,574
Beijing	33,418	32,038	30,755	30,750	31,405	25,495	11,920	3,069
Shanghai	31,976	30,490	29,403	29,109	29,312	24,277	11,993	3,712
Jiangsu	23,385	22,564	21,806	21,762	21,879	17,892	7,947	1,435
Fujian	20,107	19,366	18,581	18,498	18,420	15,264	6,117	1,367
Zhejiang	19,798	19,035	18,404	18,310	18,295	15,164	7,688	1,641
Tianjin	19,036	18,555	17,914	18,028	18,076	14,886	8,174	1,983
Guangdong	15,928	15,607	15,432	15,553	15,627	13,129	6,724	1,570
Inner Mongolia	15,705	15,447	14,804	14,738	13,932	10,606	4,999	792
Hubei	15,067	14,439	13,799	13,613	13,416	10,686	4,257	746
Chongqing	14,821	14,168	13,568	13,316	13,563	11,403	4,211	779
Shandong	14,359	13,701	13,180	13,091	12,933	10,636	5,340	1,128
Shaanxi	12,973	12,625	12,194	12,419	11,946	9,653	3,949	607
Anhui	12,156	11,612	11,176	11,059	10,936	9,183	3,293	638
Hunan	11,884	11,405	10,917	10,782	10,691	9,100	3,601	663
Xinjiang	11,421	11,045	10,731	10,657	10,051	8,031	3,693	897
Tibet	11,410	10,564	9,861	9,105	9,085	7,803	2,585	557
Sichuan	11,357	10,859	10,401	10,229	10,208	8,574	3,180	590
Jiangxi	11,236	10,652	10,256	10,378	10,237	8,288	3,157	585
Liaoning	11,213	10,986	10,633	10,495	10,403	8,781	4,781	1,360
Ningxia	10,917	10,599	10,458	10,576	10,004	8,138	3,747	656
Hainan	10,796	10,658	10,407	10,042	9,930	8,149	3,535	829
Shanxi	10,391	10,358	10,643	10,958	10,269	7,554	3,800	697
Yunnan	9,866	9,494	9,272	9,286	9,188	7,748	2,535	588
Qinghai	9,739	9,347	9,188	9,197	9,001	7,551	3,062	627
Henan	9,548	9,111	8,741	8,852	9,040	7,915	3,529	652
Hebei	9,371	9,036	8,749	8,639	8,566	7,160	3,790	848
Jilin	9,087	8,662	8,443	8,261	8,722	7,477	3,503	807
Guizhou	8,549	8,240	7,908	7,939	8,010	6,889	1,930	337
Guangxi	8,314	8,014	7,748	7,790	7,803	6,451	2,719	535
Heilongjiang	7,837	7,597	7,588	7,816	7,530	6,317	3,254	916
Gansu	7,826	7,417	7,069	6,896	6,589	5,396	2,303	507

=== GDPpc by PPP intl dollar in main years ===
GDP per capita in Chinese provincial-level divisions by purchasing power parity (intl dollar) reference only here for the frequent changes in the ppp indicator (based on the WEO published in April 2026 by IMF and revision based on the 5th econ-census)
year	2025(p)	2024(r)	2023	2022	2021	2020	2010	2000
CN¥ per intl dollar	3.3992	3.5311	3.6451	3.7959	3.9874	4.0147	3.7026	3.0262
China (mainland)	29,320	27,096	25,170	23,021	20,843	18,267	8,465	2,652
Macau	134,485	126,904	115,590	64,613	73,300	57,270	103,229	
Hongkong	80,323	75,578	71,597	67,429	65,988	58,613	45,407	25,972
Beijing	70,224	64,616	59,456	54,487	50,812	43,803	21,793	8,395
Shanghai	67,193	61,494	56,842	51,579	47,426	41,710	21,927	10,155
Jiangsu	49,141	45,508	42,155	38,561	35,400	30,740	14,530	3,925
Fujian	42,252	39,059	35,920	32,777	29,803	26,224	11,184	3,738
Zhejiang	41,603	38,392	35,578	32,444	29,600	26,053	14,057	4,489
Tianjin	40,001	37,423	34,631	31,945	29,247	25,575	14,945	5,423
Guangdong	33,469	31,476	29,833	27,559	25,285	22,557	12,294	4,294
Inner Mongolia	33,002	31,155	28,618	26,114	22,541	18,222	9,140	2,166
Hubei	31,660	29,122	26,675	24,122	21,707	18,360	7,783	2,041
Chongqing	31,143	28,576	26,230	23,594	21,945	19,592	7,699	2,132
Shandong	30,174	27,633	25,480	23,197	20,926	18,273	9,763	3,086
Shaanxi	27,260	25,464	23,574	22,005	19,328	16,585	7,219	1,660
Anhui	25,545	23,419	21,605	19,597	17,695	15,777	6,021	1,746
Hunan	24,973	23,003	21,106	19,105	17,297	15,635	6,583	1,813
Xinjiang	23,999	22,276	20,745	18,883	16,262	13,799	6,752	2,455
Tibet	23,977	21,307	19,064	16,134	14,699	13,407	4,726	1,522
Sichuan	23,866	21,901	20,107	18,126	16,516	14,730	5,813	1,615
Jiangxi	23,611	21,484	19,827	18,389	16,563	14,239	5,772	1,599
Liaoning	23,563	22,156	20,555	18,596	16,832	15,087	8,742	3,721
Ningxia	22,941	21,377	20,218	18,740	16,187	13,983	6,850	1,794
Hainan	22,687	21,496	20,119	17,793	16,066	14,001	6,464	2,268
Shanxi	21,836	20,891	20,575	19,417	16,615	12,979	6,947	1,907
Yunnan	20,732	19,148	17,924	16,454	14,866	13,312	4,635	1,608
Qinghai	20,466	18,852	17,763	16,296	14,563	12,973	5,598	1,715
Henan	20,064	18,376	16,897	15,685	14,626	13,598	6,453	1,785
Hebei	19,692	18,224	16,913	15,308	13,860	12,302	6,930	2,319
Jilin	19,094	17,470	16,322	14,638	14,111	12,847	6,405	2,207
Guizhou	17,965	16,619	15,288	14,067	12,960	11,836	3,529	921
Guangxi	17,470	16,162	14,979	13,804	12,625	11,084	4,971	1,464
Heilongjiang	16,469	15,322	14,668	13,849	12,183	10,853	5,949	2,506
Gansu	16,444	14,960	13,665	12,219	10,661	9,270	4,211	1,387

== See also ==
- Economy of China
- Historical GDP of China
- List of Chinese provincial-level divisions by GDP
- List of prefecture-level divisions of China by GDP
- List of top Chinese counties by GDP
- List of top Chinese cities by GDP
- List of top Chinese cities by GDP per capita
- List of renminbi exchange rates
- List of the largest administrative divisions by GRDP

== Sources ==
- GDP 2004-2010 figures: NBS GDP DATA – Revisions of China GDP 2004-2008 by province-level divisions
- GDP 1978-2003 figures: NBS GDP DATA – Revisions of China GDP 1978-2003 by province-level divisions
- GDP 1952-1977 figures: NBS GDP DATA – Revisions of China GDP 1952-1977 by province-level divisions

香港与澳门两个特别行政区基于当地货币、美元与购买力平价的GDP指标出自IMF数据，折算为人民币指标以本币和当年平均汇率计算
GDP data for the two special administrative regions of Hong Kong and Macau (in local currency, USD, PPP) from IMF (April 2026 World Economic Outlook). CNY equivalents calculated by converting local currency GDP using annual average exchange rates (1 CNY = ? local currency)
year		2025	2024	2023	2022	2021	2020	2010	2000
Average exchange rate	HK$ per Chinese yuan	1.0915	1.0956	1.1109	1.1643	1.2048	1.1245	1.1477	0.9418
Average exchange rate	MOP$ per Chinese yuan	1.1249	1.1291	1.1467	1.1467	1.2414	1.1588	1.1821	0.9701
GDP (local currency)	Hong Kong (HK$ millions)	3,331,774	3,186,841	2,981,210	2,808,922	2,867,973	2,675,793	1,776,332	1,337,501
GDP (local currency)	Macau (MOP$ millions)	418,039	397,560	367,905	201,061	245,242	201,964	226,016	
‌GDP (CNY‌)	Hongkong (millions)	3,052,473	2,908,763	2,683,599	2,412,541	2,380,456	2,379,540	1,547,732	1,420,159
‌GDP (CNY‌)	Macau (millions)	371,623	352,103	320,838	175,339	197,553	174,287	191,194	
GDP per capita (local currency)	Hong Kong (HK$)	443,598	424,878	396,021	375,896	387,485	360,294	251,887	199,285
GDP per capita (local currency)	Macau (MOP$)	597,944	577,597	538,109	298,842	358,961	295,658	409,227	
‌GDP per capita (CNY‌)	Hongkong	406,411	387,804	356,487	322,852	321,618	320,403	219,471	211,601
‌GDP per capita (CNY‌)	Macau	531,553	511,555	469,267	260,611	289,158	255,142	346,177	
