= List of renminbi exchange rates =

The renminbi (RMB, also known as Chinese yuan; ISO code: CNY) is the official currency of the People's Republic of China. Although it is not a freely convertible currency, and has an official exchange rate, the CNY plays an important role in the world economy and international trade. This page lists past and present CNY exchange rates with other major currencies, in both nominal and purchasing power parity (PPP) terms.

== Background ==
After taking power in 1978, Deng Xiaoping started the reform and opening up and opened China to foreign trade and investment, permitting a large influx of foreign capital and sparking rapid economic growth. In 2010, China's annual level of inward foreign direct investment (FDI) reached a record US$106 billion. As of 2013, China is the world's second-largest economy, with an estimated nominal gross domestic product (GDP) of US$8.25 trillion and a total international trade value of US$3.64 trillion. Since the mid-1990s, the official CNY exchange rate has been adopted by numerous international financial and governmental organizations, such as the International Monetary Fund (IMF), the World Bank and the United Nations (UN). The perceived undervaluing of the CNY by the Chinese government has led to tensions between China and other major economies. In August 2019, US President Donald Trump designated China a currency manipulator, a designation not supported by the IMF.

== Nominal exchange rates ==
=== List of nominal exchange rates ===
Graph showing the official exchange rate of 1 CNY to the US dollar between 1981 and 2009.

Official historical average exchange rates of Renminbi for major foreign currencies by year (Chinese yuan per 100 foreign currency units)
Year	USD	JPY	HKD	Euro
2018	661.74	5.9890	84.428	780.16
2017	675.18	6.0244	86.643	763.03
2016	664.23	6.1243	85.578	734.26
2015	622.84	5.1543	80.34	691.41
2014	614.28	5.8196	79.220	816.51
2013	619.32	6.3323	79.845	822.19
2012	631.25	7.9037	81.376	810.67
2011	645.88	8.1050	82.968	900.11
2010	676.95	7.7279	87.130	897.25
2009	683.10	7.2986	88.123	952.70
2008	694.51	6.7427	89.190	1,022.27
2007	760.40	6.4632	97.459	1,041.75
2006	797.18	6.8570	102.620	1,001.90
2005	819.17	7.4484	105.300	1,019.53
2004	827.68	7.6552	106.230	1,029.00
2003	827.70	7.1466	106.240	936.13
2002	827.70	6.6237	106.070	800.58
2001	827.70	6.8075	106.080	
2000	827.84	7.6864	106.180	
1999	827.83	7.2932	106.660	
1998	827.91	6.3488	106.880	
1997	828.98	6.8600	107.090	
1996	831.42	7.6352	107.510	
1995	835.10	8.9225	107.960	
1994	861.87	8.4370	111.530	
1993	576.20	5.2020	74.410	
1992	551.46	4.3608	71.240	
1991	532.33	3.9602	68.450	
1990	478.32	3.3233	61.390	
1989	376.51	2.7360	48.280	
1988	372.21	2.9082	47.700	
1987	372.21	2.5799	47.740	
1986	345.28	2.0694	44.220	
1985	293.66	1.2457	37.570	
1984	232.70	0.9780	29.710	
1983	197.57	0.8318	27.360	
1982	189.25	0.7607	31.150	
1981	170.50	0.7735	30.410	

=== List of World Bank nominal exchange rates ===
World Bank annual average middle exchange rate for US dollar to Chinese yuan ( 1 US dollar to Chinese yuan )
Year	US dollar	Year	US dollar	Year	US dollar	Year	US dollar
2019		2004	8.2768	1989	4.9400	1974	1.9612
2018	6.98	2003	8.2770	1988	4.8600	1973	1.9894
2017	6.89	2002	8.2770	1987	4.4600	1972	2.2451
2016		2001	8.2771	1986	3.4500	1971	2.4618
2015		2000	8.2784	1985	2.9400	1970	2.4618
2014		1999	8.2783	1984	2.8000	1969	2.4618
2013		1998	8.2791	1983	2.6100	1968	2.4618
2012	6.3123	1997	8.2898	1982	2.6200	1967	2.4618
2011	6.4615	1996	8.3142	1981	2.5200	1966	2.4618
2010	6.7703	1995	8.3507	1980	2.4000	1965	2.4618
2009	6.8300	1994	8.6187	1979	2.3000	1964	2.4618
2008	6.9451	1993	8.0213	1978	2.4600	1963	2.4618
2007	7.6075	1992	6.3700	1977	1.8578	1962	2.4618
2006	7.9734	1991	5.7400	1976	1.9414	1961	2.4618
2005	8.1943	1990	5.2300	1975	1.8598	1960	2.4618

=== List of IMF nominal exchange rates ===
International Monetary Fund annual average middle exchange rate for US dollar to Chinese yuan ( 1 US dollar to Chinese yuan )
Year	US dollar	Year	US dollar	Year	US dollar	Year	US dollar
2019		2009	6.8310	1999	8.2783	1989	3.7651
2018		2008	6.9480	1998	8.2790	1988	3.7221
2017		2007	7.6071	1997	8.2898	1987	3.7221
2016		2006	7.9735	1996	8.3142	1986	3.4528
2015		2005	8.1942	1995	8.3514	1985	2.9367
2014		2004	8.2768	1994	8.6187	1984	2.3200
2013	6.15	2003	8.2770	1993	5.7620	1983	1.9757
2012	6.3124	2002	8.2769	1992	5.5146	1982	1.8925
2011	6.4614	2001	8.2771	1991	5.3234	1981	1.7045
2010	6.7704	2000	8.2784	1990	4.7832	1980	1.4984

== List of purchasing power parity exchange rates ==
Purchasing power parity (PPP) figures vary based on inflation and the revision of census figures in different periods. The following is a list of CNY exchange rates based on PPP, estimated according to the International Monetary Fund's World Economic Outloo wek (WEO) database from 2006–present. The exchange rate shown is Intl$. 1 to Chinese yuan (CNY).

List of CNY–$Intl. PPP exchange rates by periods (IMF's WEO data)
Data period	Apr.2012	Sept.2011	Apr.2011	Oct.2010	Oct.2009	Oct.2008	Oct.2007	Sept.2006
2012	4.2382	4.1314	4.0825	3.9749	3.7210	3.9959		
2011	4.1731	4.0492	4.0662	3.9366	3.7113	3.9415		
2010	3.9643	3.9327	3.9460	3.8620	3.7139	3.8823		
2009	3.7603	3.7593	3.7638	3.7638	3.7241	3.7930		
2008	3.8231	3.8224	3.8210	3.8217	3.7932	3.6936	2.1728	
2007	3.6264	3.6245	3.6220	3.6226	3.6141	3.5471	2.1272	1.9641
2006	3.4668	3.4661	3.4652	3.4655	3.4603	3.4617	2.0781	1.9427
2005	3.4476	3.4476	3.4476	3.4476	3.4476	3.4476	2.0767	1.9452
2004	3.4032	3.4032	3.4032	3.4032	3.4032	3.4032	2.0579	1.9141
2003	3.2667	3.2667	3.2667	3.2667	3.2667	3.2667	1.9802	1.8374
2002	3.2512	3.2505	3.2521	3.2551	3.2522	3.2513	1.9709	1.8270
2001	3.2842	3.2839	3.2855	3.2886	3.2858	3.2888	1.9936	1.8481
2000	3.2908	3.2902	3.2922	3.2950	3.2926	3.3000	2.0004	1.8544
1999	3.2951	3.2935	3.2955	3.2983	3.2960	3.3038	2.0027	1.8565
1998	3.3867	3.3844	3.3865	3.3893	3.3870	3.3942	2.0575	1.8991
1997	3.4556	3.4522	3.4544	3.4573	3.4549	3.4615	2.0983	1.9372
1996	3.4641	3.4607	3.4630	3.4659	3.4635	3.4667	2.1014	1.9401
1995	3.3169	3.3133	3.3156	3.3184	3.3159	3.3188	2.0118	1.8573
1994	2.9778	2.9747	2.9759	2.9784	2.9770	2.9777	1.8050	1.6664
1993	2.5206	2.5184	2.5194	2.5215	2.5202	2.5214	1.5284	1.4111
1992	2.2372	2.2359	2.2368	2.2387	2.2377	2.2408	1.3439	1.2353
1991	2.1167	2.1147	2.1155	2.1173	2.1164	2.1179	1.2742	1.1712
1990	2.0508	2.0493	2.0503	2.0520	2.0509	2.0514	1.2356	1.1357
1989	2.0132	2.0110	2.0118	2.0135	2.0132	2.0131	1.2143	1.1162
1988	1.9254	1.9233	1.9240	1.9257	1.9248	1.9254	1.1582	1.0646
1987	1.7768	1.7749	1.7756	1.7771	1.7758	1.7764	1.0683	0.9819
1986	1.7387	1.7368	1.7375	1.7390	1.7373	1.7354	1.0445	0.9601
1985	1.6966	1.6947	1.6954	1.6969	1.6961	1.6933	1.0206	0.9381
1984	1.5861	1.5844	1.5850	1.5863	1.5853	1.5833	0.9548	0.8776
1983	1.5683	1.5665	1.5672	1.5685	1.5671	1.5654	0.9444	0.8681
1982	1.6141	1.6124	1.6130	1.6144	1.6128	1.6112	0.9714	0.8929
1981	1.0073	1.0062	1.0066	1.0074	1.7478	1.7474	1.0535	0.9684
1980	1.2251	1.2238	1.2243	1.2253	1.8695	1.8602	1.1216	1.0354
