= Shanghai Free-Trade Zone =

Coordinates: 31.3343°N 121.5990°E

Shanghai Free-Trade Zone 中国（上海）自由贸易试验区
- Free-Trade Zone
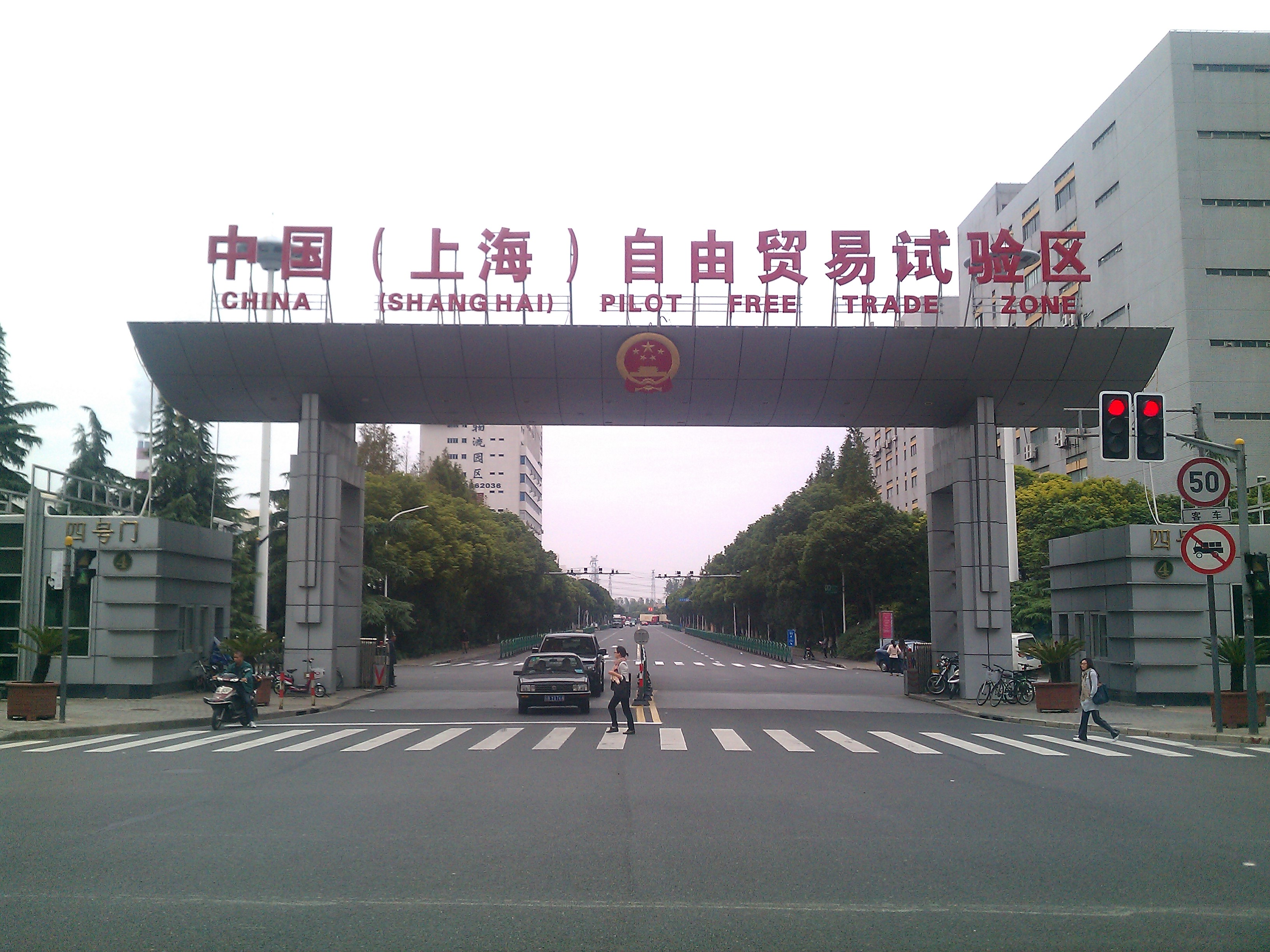
- Gate 4 of Waigaoqiao FTZ
- Interactive map of Shanghai Free-Trade Zone
- Country: China
- Municipality: Shanghai
- District: Pudong

Area
  - Total: 240.22 km^{2} (92.75 sq mi)
- Time zone: UTC+8 (China Standard)
- Website: en-shftz.pudong.gov.cn

Shanghai Free-Trade Zone
- Simplified Chinese: 中国（上海）自由贸易试验区
- Traditional Chinese: 中國（上海）自由貿易試驗區
Transcriptions
Standard Mandarin
- Hanyu Pinyin: Zhōngguó (Shànghǎi) Zìyóu Màoyì Shìyànqū

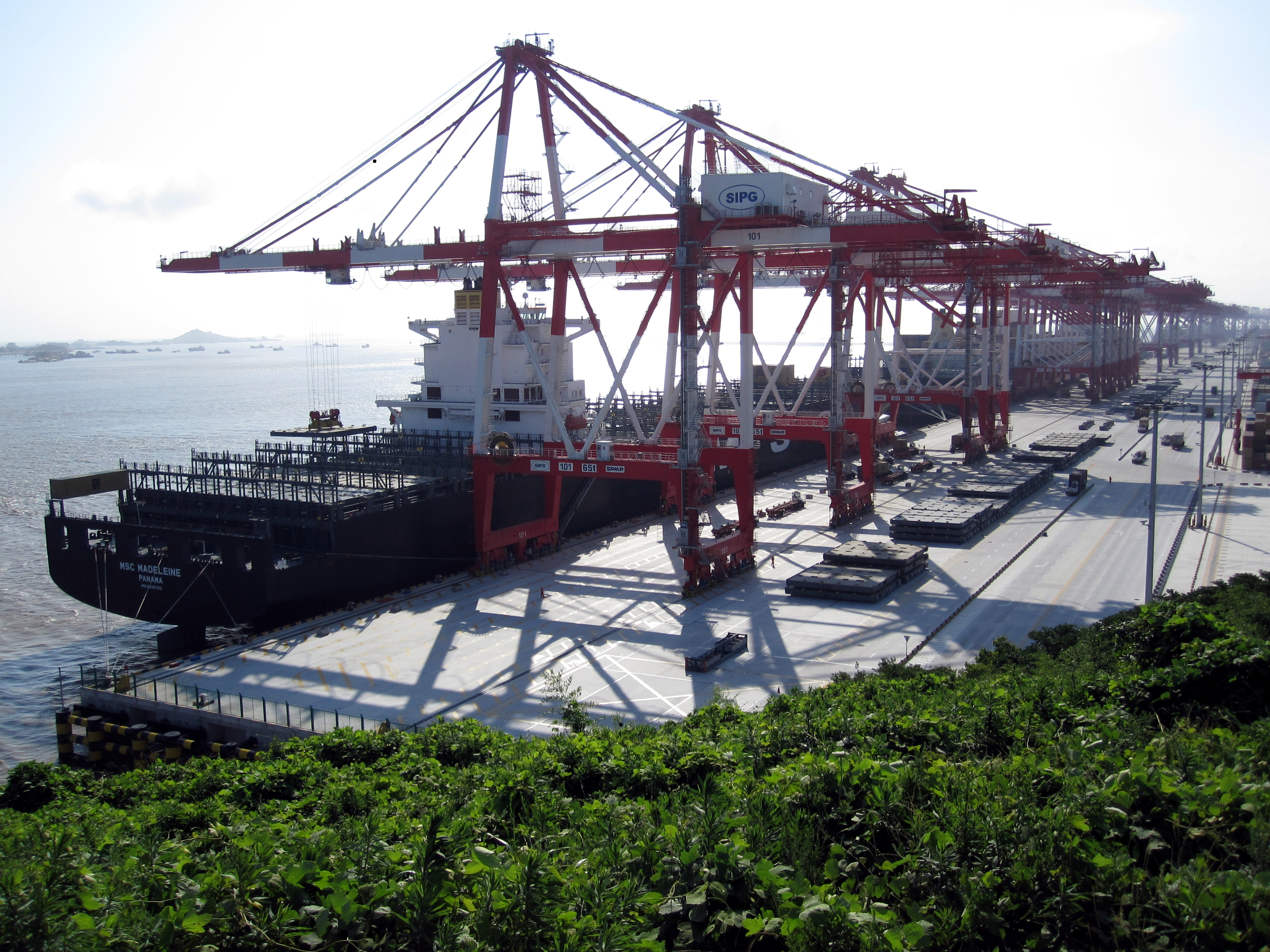
Yangshan Port

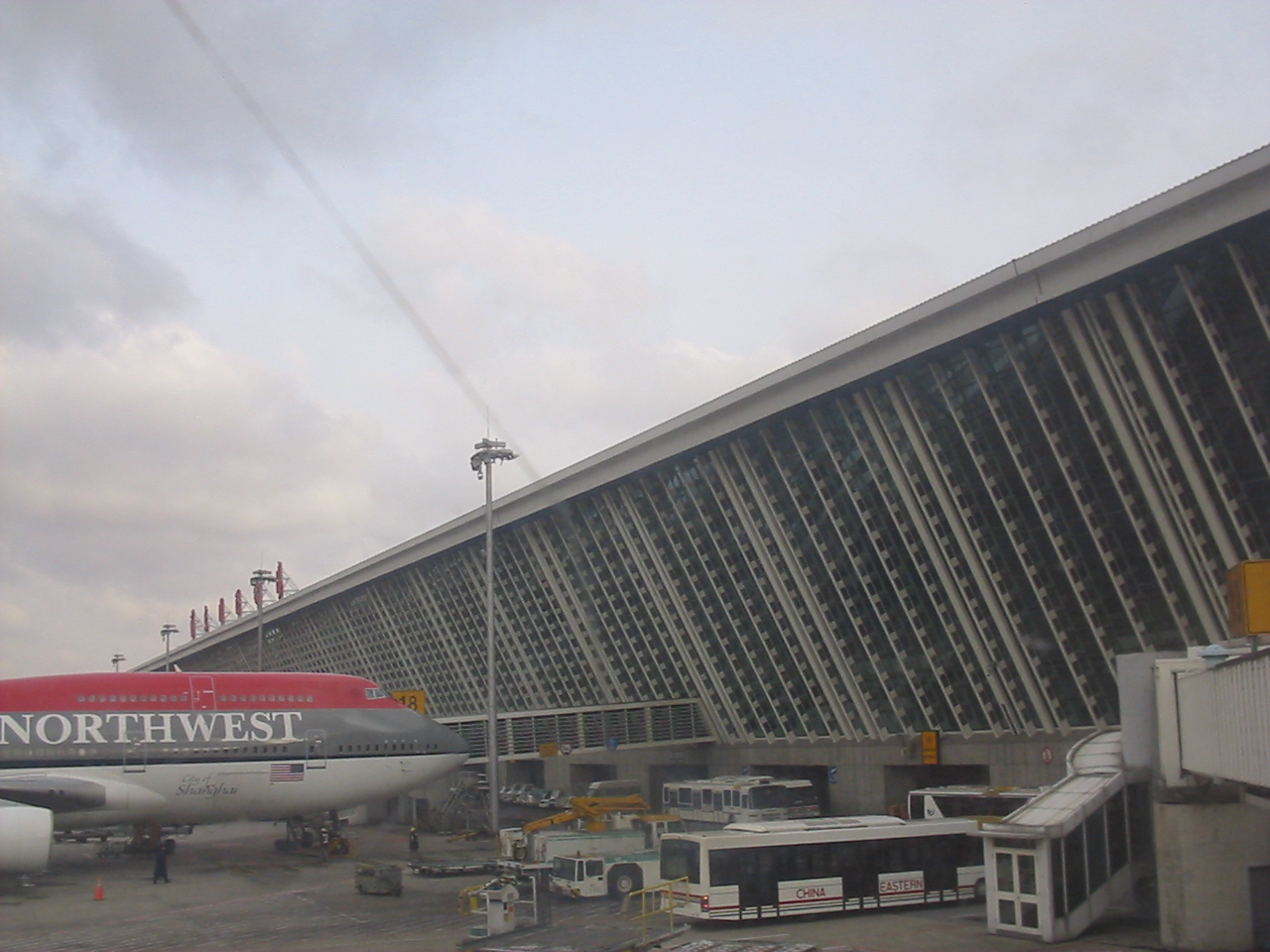
Pudong Airport

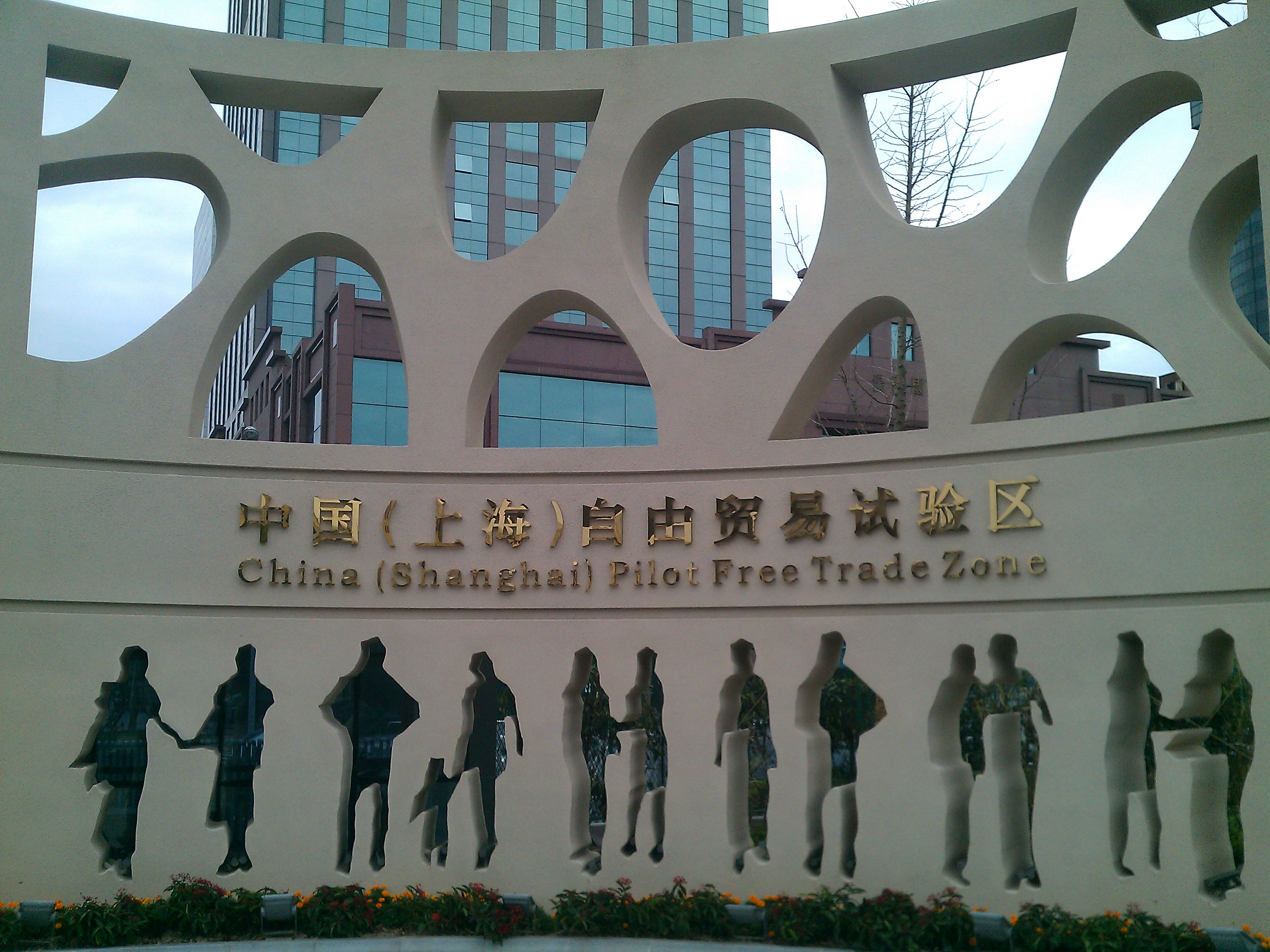
Gate 2 of Waigaoqiao FTZ

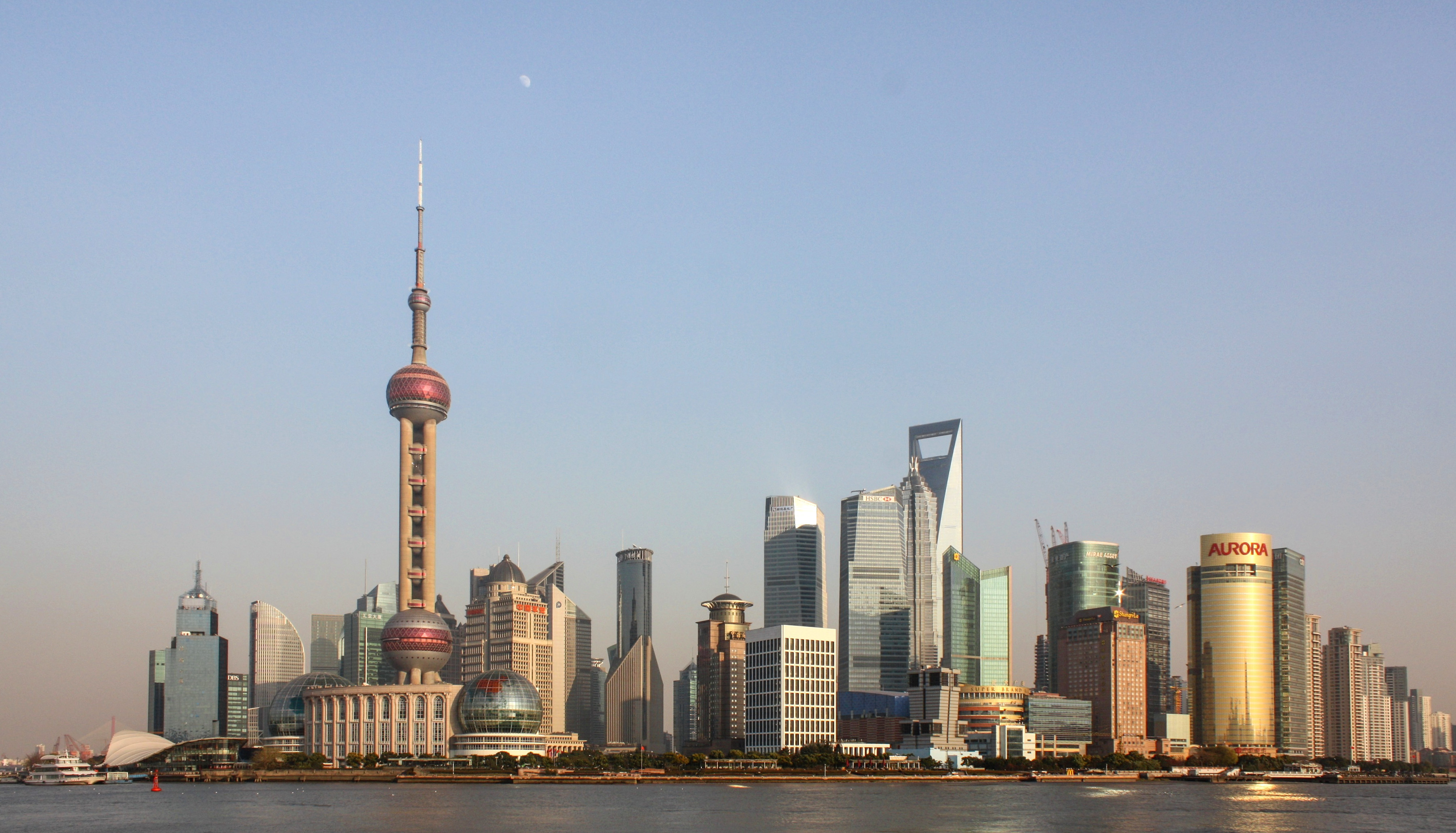
Lujiazui

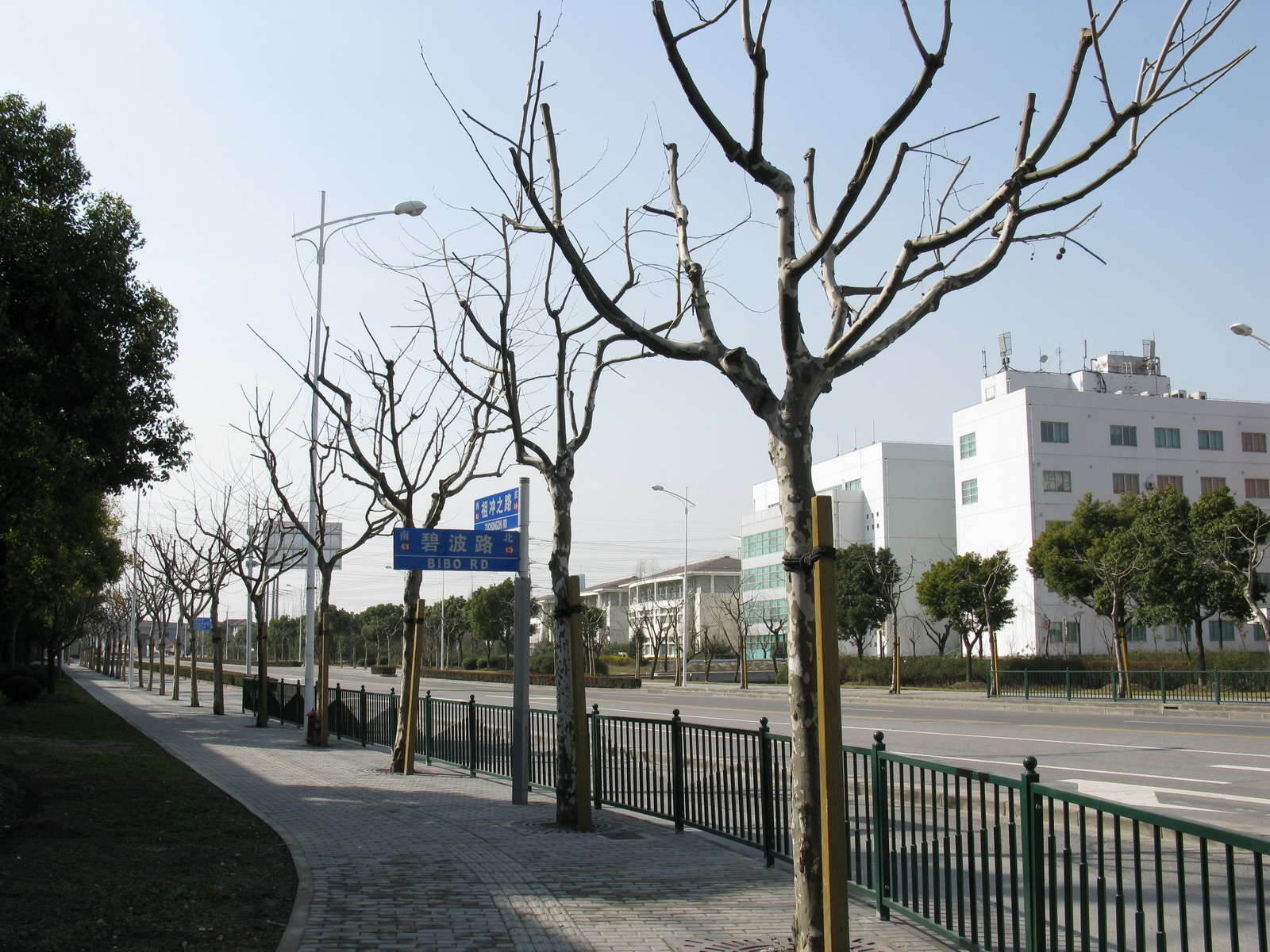
Zhangjiang Hi-Tech Park

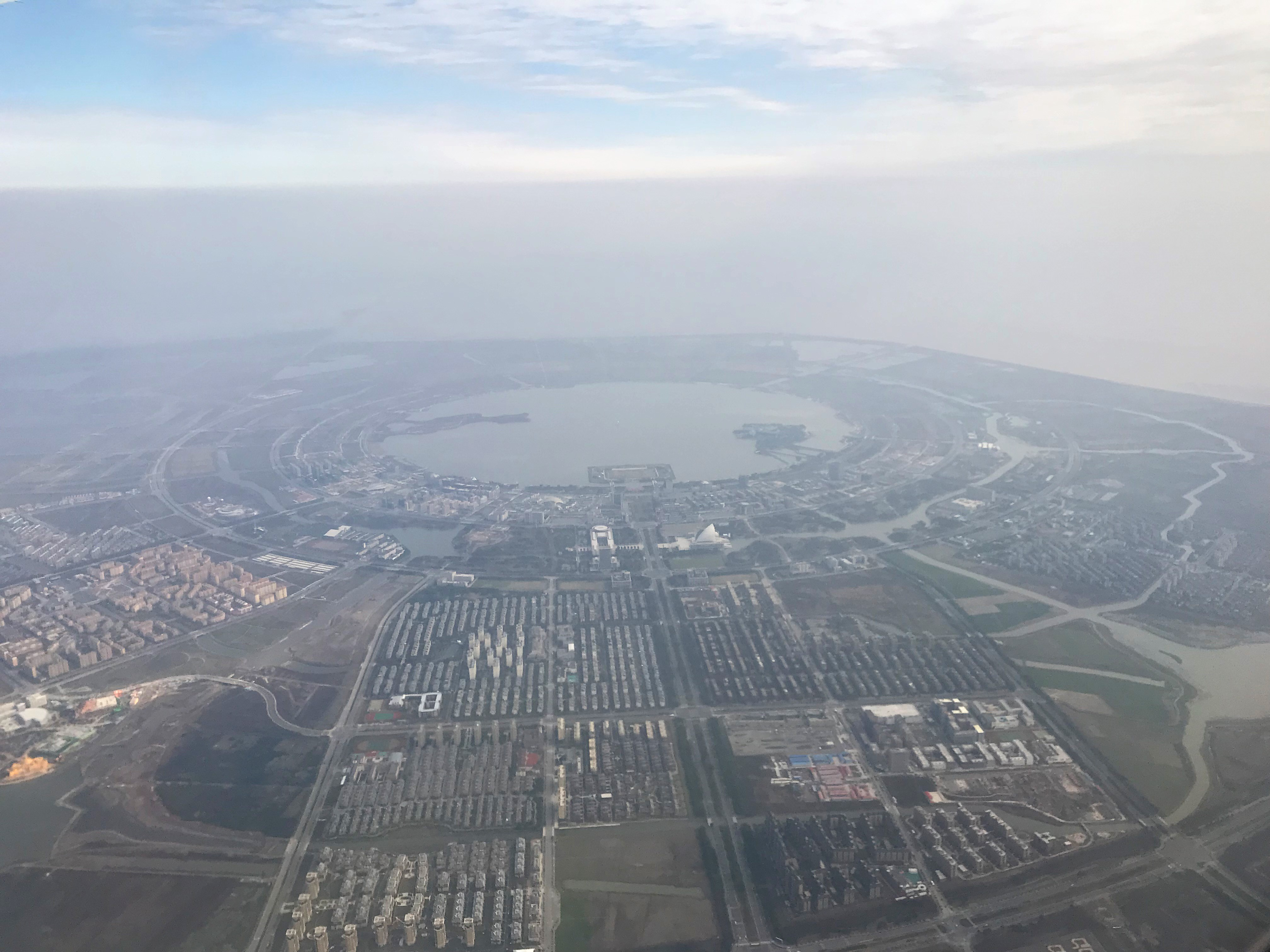
Dishui Lake in Lingang New City

Shanghai Free-Trade Zone (Note: Colloquially known as 上海自由贸易区/上海自贸区 in Chinese) (Shanghai FTZ or SFTZ), officially China (Shanghai) Pilot Free-Trade Zone, (Note: Chinese: 中国（上海）自由贸易试验区; pinyin: Zhōngguó (Shànghǎi) Zìyóu Màoyì Shìyànqū) is a free-trade zone in Shanghai, China. On 22 August 2013, the State Council approved the establishment of the zone. Officially launched on 29 September 2013 with the backing of Chinese premier Li Keqiang, it is the first free-trade zone in mainland China and covers an area of 240.2 square kilometres (92.7 sq mi). Shanghai FTZ integrates four existing bonded zones in the district of Pudong—Waigaoqiao Free Trade Zone, Waigaoqiao Free Trade Logistics Park, Yangshan Free Trade Port Area and Pudong Airport Comprehensive Free Trade Zone.

Since 21 April 2015, the zone's areas have been expanded to include Lujiazui Financial and Trade Zone, Shanghai Jinqiao Economic and Technological Development Zone (formerly Jinqiao Export Processing Zone) and Zhangjiang Hi-Tech Park. On 6 August 2019, Shanghai FTZ's areas were expanded again to include Nanhui New City (Lingang New City), Lingang Equipment Industry Area, Xiao Yangshan island (Yangshan Port) and the south side of Pudong Airport, collectively forming the Lingang Special Area.

== Features ==
The zone is being used as a testing ground for a number of economic and social reforms. For example, the sale of video game consoles, banned in China since 2000, will be allowed within the zone. While Microsoft had aimed at having its Xbox on the market by late April 2014, it ended up being delayed to 23 September 2014. While selling video game consoles was exclusive to the zone at the time, the ban on video game consoles was later lifted completely in 2015.

Although it was initially reported that the zone would also have unrestricted access to the internet (with bans on sites such as Facebook lifted), the official Xinhua News Agency has stated that Internet restrictions would not be lifted.

Commodities entering the zone are not subject to duty and customs clearance as would otherwise be the case. This has been a boom to the wine industry in China, as it grants importers more flexibility in bringing wine into the country.

=== Arbitration ===
The FTZ features a mechanism for dispute resolution that doesn't exist elsewhere in China. Arbitration in the zone is governed by a separate set of Arbitration Rules issued by the Shanghai International Arbitration Center (SHIAC). These introduce several reforms favourable to foreign investment in the FTZ, including emergency arbitration, hybrid mediation/arbitration, and lower barriers to summary procedure. Additionally, arbitrators may be chosen from outside of the official roster maintained by SHIAC, provided they satisfy certain qualifying criteria.

=== Corporate establishment ===
The zone cancels out a number of financial requirements for setting up a company in China, including the minimum registration capital of RMB30,000 for limited liability companies, the RMB100,000 minimum for single shareholder companies, and the RMB5 million minimum for joint stock companies. Moreover, under the FTZ's new capital registration system, foreign investors are no longer required to contribute 15 percent capital within three months and full capital within two years of the establishment of a foreign invested enterprise (FIE).

Instead, shareholders of companies established in the zone may agree upon the contribution amount, form, and period of contribution at their own discretion. However, shareholders are still liable for the authenticity and legality of capital contributions and will be held accountable to the company within the limits of their respective subscribed capital or shares.

In addition to these financial reforms, the FTZ also introduces a simplified procedure for foreign investors to establish a company in China. The "one-stop application processing platform" unique to the zone requires that all application materials be submitted to and handled by the Industry and Commerce Authority (AIC) in the zone. The relevant approval and filing procedures are then conducted via inter-departmental circulation, after which the various licenses and certificates (including the business license, enterprise code certificate, and tax registration certificate) are issued to the applicant(s) by the AIC.

This means that applicants may obtain all the necessary documents for company establishment in one place, in contrast with outside the zone where applicants must run around between different authorities for the issuance of various certificates.

According to the Shanghai Statistics Bureau, close to 10,000 businesses had registered within the FTZ as of June 2014—661 of which were foreign-invested enterprises. By the end of 2020, a total of 69,000 enterprises had been established in the FTZ, including 12,000 foreign enterprises.

=== Foreign exchange ===
As announced by the State Administration of Foreign Exchange (SAFE) Shanghai branch on 28 February 2014, the FTZ will permit yuan convertibility and unrestricted foreign currency exchange, and a tax-free period of 10 years for the businesses in the area as a means to simplify the process of foreign direct investment (FDI) and facilitate the management of capital accounts.

Under the new regulations, foreign invested enterprises (FIEs) registered in the FTZ may now make foreign exchange capital account settlements at their own discretion, as opposed to under the previous rules, where settlements were restricted to those deemed to be "actual needs" by SAFE. FIEs in the FTZ may also now open RMB special deposit accounts to hold RMB funds obtained from foreign exchange settlements, which may then be used to make payments for real transactions. However, restrictions still apply for using RMB funds for certain types of transactions.

=== Real estate ===
Given that the FTZ amalgamated two existing bonded zones—Waigaoqiao and Yangshan—a large percentage of its total area is given over to industrial use. Moreover, commercial space was quickly snatched up by speculators betting on the future desirability of the zone's preferential policies. This drove up office rents in the FTZ and has created a bubble in the sector. In response, the Shanghai municipal government implemented measures to rezone industrial districts for commercial and R&D usage. Notably, enterprises are permitted to register virtual offices in the FTZ, through which they can still enjoy the zone's distinctive regulations.

=== Foreign investment ===
The zone introduces a number of reforms designed to create a preferential environment for foreign investment. On 18 September 2013, the State Council published a list of 18 service industries to receive more relaxed policies in the zone, including medical services, value-added telecommunications, ocean freight and international ship management and banking. Another important feature of the zone is found in its "negative list" approach to foreign investment, which is permitted in all sectors unless explicitly prohibited by the inclusion of a given sector on the Negative List published by the Shanghai municipal government. The 16 sectors thus named as restricted or prohibited for foreign investment are organized as follows:

- Agriculture, forestry, animal husbandry and fishery
- Mining
- Manufacturing
- Production and supply of power, gas and water
- Construction
- Wholesale and retail
- Transportation, warehousing and postal services
- Information transmission, computer services and software
- Finance
- Real estate
- Leasing and commercial services
- Scientific research and technical services
- Water conservancy, environmental, and public facilities management
- Education
- Health and Social Industries
- Cultural, sports and entertainment industries

The Negative List was updated in July 2014, further relaxing restrictions on foreign investment in the financial industry, manufacturing, and transportation services.

In March 2019, China adopted the Foreign Investment Law, which legalizes the state's power to establish FTZs and carry out pilot policies and measures on foreign investment in specific sectors.

== Specific industries ==
=== E-commerce ===
In one of the first measures introduced as part of the Shanghai FTZ, the General Administration of Customs (GAC) launched a cross-border E-commerce platform, buyeasi.com (Chinese: 跨境通; pinyin: Kuàjìng tōng). This was intended to stymie the widespread evasion of customs duty and smuggling that have emerged amidst China's booming e-commerce market through online vendors such as Taobao. Products on the new site, which will be monitored by the GAC, are sold by vendors who have conducted record-filing with the customs authorities, thereby avoiding the risk of fake products and lowering product prices through the use of bonded warehouses.

=== Legal services ===
The FTZ introduces two main changes to the Chinese legal services industry: firstly, whereas previously foreign lawyers were prohibited from directly participating in China's legal affairs and foreign law firms were only permitted to set up a branch or a representative office (RO) in China, under the FTZ pilot program, a foreign law firm that has established an RO in the Shanghai FTZ will be allowed to enter into an agreement with a Chinese law firm to mutually dispatch lawyers to the other firm.

Secondly, foreign law firms that have already established ROs in China can now set up joint operations in the Shanghai FTZ with Chinese law firms, whereby they may provide legal services to Chinese and foreign clients based on Chinese and foreign laws in accordance with the rights and obligations stipulated in their agreement.

=== Logistics, warehousing, and transportation ===
The logistics industry in the FTZ benefits from the presence of Waigaoqiao Port, Yangshan Deepwater Port, and Pudong International Airport, as well as the streamlined customs approval process in the zone, which halves the time required to bring goods into/out of China. As a result of the rush of companies looking to incorporate in the zone, industrial property (warehouses) has witnessed soaring rental prices in comparison with elsewhere in Shanghai.

=== Marine insurance ===
Insurance companies in the FTZ are able to apply to the Shanghai Institute of Marine Insurance for approval to offer new marine insurance products. This is the first instance of an industry association being granted such powers in China, and is intended to raise the competitiveness of Shanghai's marine insurance industry.

=== Medical ===
Under legislation issued by the Shanghai Municipal Government, foreign investors may establish wholly foreign-owned enterprises (WFOE) in the medical industry in the FTZ. Foreign ownership (up to 70 percent) is also permitted for equity or cooperative joint ventures in the medical industry. Both forms of establishment are subject to certain conditions, such as a minimum total investment of RMB20 million and a maximum operating period of 20 years.

=== Telecom ===
China's telecom sector remains heavily restricted in the FTZ as elsewhere in China, where the industry is dominated by state-owned giants China Mobile, China Unicom and China Telecom. However, the zone does allow foreign investment in "value-added telecom services" (VATS), defined as non-core telecom services (i.e. services other than voice calls, fax, and basic messaging). VATS enterprises in the zone also benefit from a shortened approval process.
