= Customs clearance in China =

Customs

Customs clearance can be conducted at any one of the many customs offices in China. A commercial invoice, packing list and the CIF (cost, insurance and freight) must be provided for the shipment. It is also important to make sure that all documentation shows the complete country name as “People’s Republic of China.”

== Issues in customs clearance ==
Customs clearance in China may function as a major trade barrier, particularly because the lack of transparency regarding tariffs regulation, contingents of imports and licenses, processes for imports and sales of non-Chinese goods often makes things complicated. In addition, due to different settlement systems, complications may occur regarding the classification of products. Mainly in the field of harmonized customs tariff numbers (HS Codes) companies are often confronted with extensive issues.

== Obligatory certificates ==
For products which require Chinese certificates, copies of the respective documents (CCC, CEL, CFDA, CRCC, HAF 604, etc.) must be enclosed to the exporting goods. Depending on the applicable regulations, the certified products have to be marked and a printing permission has to be obtained. In case that assembled products are certified as a system, it is of importance to send the goods assembled to China. Otherwise it is possible that the customs officers demand certificates for every single component. Many companies expect a smooth customs clearance process in China because their products are not mandatory for a certification. However, it often occurs that products are detained in customs clearance with a note saying certifications are required. In most cases, the HS Code, product name or a product specification implies a certification obligation so that customs officers expect a certificate. If products are wrongfully detained in customs but the products are not obliged for a certification, the manufacturer still has to cover the costs for storage, destroying the goods or send them back to the country of origin.

== Customs Clearance of Used Machines ==
For the import of used machines, a specific import license and approval of the China Certification and Inspection Group (CCIC) is required. Barriers for the import of used machines exist due to the contingencies and restrictions imposed. The exact product-specific regulations are accessible at the CCIC.

== Process of Customs Clearance ==
China with no unified custom process, standards and requirements or a single custom entity makes the process more complex. As customs regulation may vary from region to region across China. Each custom office has its own regulations and requirements for clearance. The following is a brief detail how export process works at the Shanghai Customs Office.

=== Confirm the Goods Dispatching Date ===
-Order Confirmation - confirm the price and quantity of goods.

-Contract Confirmation - confirm the final contract, be clear about price, quantity and shipping date.

=== Informing Freight Forwarding ===
-Prepare documents attesting to the giving or receiving of money, goods, etc. with freight forwarding, such as receipts, bills, vouchers and invoices.

-Prepare documents including B/L, commercial invoice, packing list, contract, certificate of origin, quality inspection certificate, etc. (different documents are required regarding to different countries).

=== Customs Clearance Process ===
-Exchange for original bill of loading with local forwarding agent.

-Online customs declaration with China Customs.

-Complete final inspection work with China Customs.

-Allow to pass.

=== Transportation ===
Before transportation, China Customs will check whether the goods have health certificate and animal or plants quarantine issued by General Administration of Quality Supervision, Inspection and Quarantine of the People's Republic of China. If so, appointment with China Customs is needed at least one day before shipping. China Customs is required to check the health certificates.

== Customs Clearance of Used Machines ==
For the import of used machines, a specific import license and approval of the China Certification and Inspection Group (CCIC) is required. Barriers for the import of used machines exist due to the contingencies and restrictions imposed. The exact product-specific regulations are accessible at the CCIC.
