= CRCC =

CRCC may refer to:

- China Railway Construction Corporation, and its subsidiary
  - China Railway Construction Corporation Limited
- China Railways Test and Certification Center
- CRCC Asia
- Civilian Review and Complaints Commission for the Royal Canadian Mounted Police
