= Austen Morris Associates =

Austen Morris Associates, Ltd
- Company type: Private Limited
- Industry: Financial services
- Founded: 1994 in Dubai
- Founders: Greg Morris, Austen Hempstead
- Headquarters: China, South Africa
- Products: Financial planning, Wealth management, financial consulting
- Website: austenmorris.com

Austen Morris Associates, Ltd is a financial planning and wealth management company providing financial consultancy and advice on international investment structures, long-term financial security, portfolio management, wealth protection, private equity and venture capital funds to investment management groups.

Austen Morris Associates’ Asia Pacific Headquarter is a fully licensed Wholly Foreign Owned Enterprise (WFOE), located in Shanghai, China. Director P Morris, Company Registration NO: 2011/123991/07 Austen Morris Associates Africa (Pty) Ltd is an authorised financial services provider. FSP number: 43758.

== History and Operations ==
Greg Morris and co-founder Austen Hempstead founded Austen Morris Associates in Dubai in 1994. The company expanded its headquarters to the more stable and regulated Singapore in 1997. In 1999 China was ready for professional services and Greg Morris moved the team to open its first mainland office as a legitimate WFOE in 2003. By 2008 there were offices in Beijing, Suzhou, Pudong, Philippines, Thailand, Vietnam and Indonesia. During this time the company claims to have had clients investing from over 50 countries.

In July 2013, Greg and Senior Partner, Wade Dawson, opened the first office in South Africa.

The company, founded by two British financial advisors, to meet an increasing need in the financial services industry aimed to provide expatriates with wealth management and financial planning options and supply independent advice with an emphasis on continual guidance and support.

Headquartered in China, South Africa and the Philippines, the company operates in Asia and Africa to meet the demand for specialized services and financial opportunities for global investors. The company has over 50 staff members supporting the Asia Pacific region and a growing team in South Africa and the Philippines to cater large number of clients.

== Community work ==
Austen Morris Associates has also claimed to be committed to charitable contributions; this includes investing in the communities where clients, staff and consultants live; seminar sponsorships, local sports leagues, community events, charities and non-profit partners. Many of the efforts and fund raising are aimed at supporting overseas employees' involvement in schools, clubs, chambers, sports, health and fitness, organizations and community service projects. The Corporate Social Responsibility program claims to embrace responsibility for the company's actions and encourage a positive impact through its activities on the environment, consumers, employees and communities. Notably, the company holds an annual charity event, Chi Fan for Charity.
