= American Chamber of Commerce in Shanghai =

Advocacy organization of U.S. companies in China

The American Chamber of Commerce in Shanghai is an organization that promotes American businesses in China through its main offices in Shanghai. AmCham Shanghai was founded in 1915 as the third American Chamber of Commerce established outside the United States, and now has 3,000 members from 1,000 companies. Its membership ranges from large corporations to small startups and includes companies from diverse industries. As a non-profit, non-partisan business organization, AmCham Shanghai promotes free trade, open markets, private enterprise and the unrestricted flow of information.

== Structure ==
AmCham is a chamber of commerce governed by a Board of Governors and represented by a public-facing President.

=== Board of Governors ===
The AmCham Shanghai Board of Governors is responsible for the policymaking of the organization and the general direction of the Chamber's activities. The Board also has a fiduciary responsibility. The 11 Governors are elected by voting members for staggered, two-year terms. Each fall approximately one half of the Board stands for election at the Annual General Meeting. The Board has four officers: a chair, two Vice Chairs and a Treasurer. Two Honorary Governors are also appointed yearly from the U.S. Consulate General in Shanghai.

=== President ===
The Chamber's current President is Eric Zheng. He assumed his position in January 2022.

== Publications ==
AmCham Shanghai offers a wide variety of content to help members navigate the business landscape in China, including Insight magazine, the annual China Business Report (CBR), Weekly Briefing, Viewpoint advocacy and policy documents.

CBR – The China Business Report (CBR) is an annual publication based on the results of AmCham’s annual business sentiment survey. The survey questions company heads about business performance, forecast and strategy, the regulatory and operational environment, regional investment, and other areas pertinent to the business environment at the time of the survey. These have included trade policy, trade tensions, local competition and the impact of China’s digital transformation on business.

The CBR has been quoted by the AFP, Bloomberg, CNBC, the Financial Times , the New York Times, Reuters, the Wall Street Journal and many other esteemed publications.

Insight– Insight is AmCham Shanghai's quarterly magazine released at the beginning of every January, April, July and October. The journal includes Economy, Policy and Business sections, as well as Chamber news. Featured experts include: Kerry Brown (King’s College London), Derek Scissors (American Enterprise Institute), Victor Shih (UCSD), Susan Shirk (UCSD), Steve Tsang (SOAS), Wang Yong (Peking University), Wu XinBo (Fudan University) and Rod Wye (Chatham House).

Weekly Briefing - AmCham Shanghai provides members with an analysis of news stories related to Chinese business, the economy, policymaking and more. Weekly Briefings are sent via email every Thursday afternoon and published on the website every Friday.

== Membership ==
AmCham Shanghai's membership includes over 3,000 total members, including over 1,000 corporate members. Members come from diverse backgrounds and missions, all of which intersect with China. AmCham Shanghai hosts 20 industry committees for members. Each committee is advised by business leaders who identify key issues in their industries and drive year-round programming. Events include small-scale roundtables, speaker series, and cross-industry conferences.

== Membership services and programs ==
A range of benefits are available to members; specific benefits may vary with type and classification of membership. Services include professional development, conference room rental, medical insurance, as well as access to a wide variety of events and publications. The Chamber facilitates business support, market access, policy advocacy, and relationship-building activities. Select Chamber programs are detailed below.

=== Medical Benefits Program ===
The Medical Benefits Program (MBP) is designed to deliver exclusive high-quality insurance options to our members. Working with Essential, the AmCham Shanghai MBP offers members the chance to buy select insurance products at a discounted price. The program is designed to serve both member companies and individual members.

=== Executive Briefings ===
AmCham Shanghai offers executive briefings as an opportunity to bring tailored insight by expert speakers to member companies in an exclusive setting. Speakers include the AmCham Shanghai directors and president as well as external industry experts.

=== Government Advocacy Initiatives ===
AmCham Shanghai conducts structured, in-person engagements with government authorities at all levels to communicate member perspectives, seek clarification on policy developments, and promote timely and constructive information exchange through institutional channels.

=== CEO Circle ===
The CEO Circle is by invitation only, and limited to CEOs, CFOs, Presidents, Senior VPs, or a company’s most senior executive in China. Participation is at the discretion of the Chamber. The program brings senior executives together to hear from academics, authors, businesspeople, economists, government officials and policy makers with deep China expertise.

=== Business Partnership ===
The Business Partnership Department of AmCham Shanghai provides services to local governments and other relevant stakeholders, helping various Chinese regions attract foreign investment. They also offer customized services based upon members’ requests.

== YRD Chapters ==
Covering the Suzhou, Hangzhou and Nanjing chapters, the Yangtze River Delta (YRD) Center serves to support member engagement and business development across the YRD region. Through locally relevant programs and services, the YRD Center facilitates networking, information exchange and dialogue among US businesses, local Chinese governments and the US government. The YRD Center works closely with teams in Shanghai to address members’ needs and strengthen the presence of the US business community in the region.

== History ==
=== Founding ===
The American Chamber of Commerce in Shanghai was founded on June 9, 1915, at Shanghai's Palace Hotel. Forty-five American businessmen gathered to establish “The American Chamber of Commerce of China” and appointed a provisional committee of ten individuals to draft a constitution and bylaws. J.H. McMichael was named chairman of the new chamber's provisional committee, together with nine other members, including representatives from American Steel, Standard Oil, British American Tobacco, R.H. Macy & Co., Singer Sewing and Dollar Shipping.

The Chamber elected its first officers and established bylaws on August 18, 1915. J.H. McMichael was the Chamber's first president and J.W. Gallagher of United States Steel was elected vice president. The Chamber was the third American Chamber of Commerce established outside the United States.

=== Early years ===
By March 1916 the organization had 32 corporate members, 26 individual members and a bank balance of US$2,057.25. By 1919, Chamber membership had grown to 200 members.

Harold Dollar (Dollar Shipping) and V.G. Lyman (Standard Oil) led the Chamber from 1922 to 1925 as president and Vice President. The Chamber moved into permanent offices in the Dollar Building on Canton Road and hired a full-time director.

The Shanghai Chamber changed its name on October 19, 1922, to the “American Chamber of Commerce (Shanghai)” and established an umbrella organization based in Shanghai to coordinate the work of all China AmChams called the “Associated American Chambers of Commerce in China.”

=== Pre-war period ===
During the period between Japan's 1937 military actions in China and the U.S. declaration of war on Japan in December 1941, the Chamber continued to operate. One new advocacy issue for the Chamber was to counter trade restrictions imposed by Japan against American trade with China and “Japan’s continued aggression against American rights and interests in China.” As of 1940, the Chamber had a permanent staff of five and 18 special committees. It continued to publish a periodic newsletter called “The Fishbowl,” which reported on comings and goings within the business community. The Chamber offices in the American Club were seized by the Japanese army on December 10, 1941, and all Chamber activities came to a halt.

=== Post-war chamber ===
The first post-war gathering of the Chamber took place on September 10, 1945, at the Shanghai YMCA. The Chamber's constitution was reissued both in 1946 and 1948, in part to comply with registration requirements from the Nationalist government. The language of the mission statement was different from that used in 1915, but the overall objectives were the same: promote bilateral trade, support U.S. companies in China, collect and disseminate useful commercial information, and promote American interests in China. AmCham Shanghai temporarily ended its operations by the end of 1950, as the American business presence in Shanghai had ceased to exist.

=== Revival ===
The revival of the Chamber occurred at a time when China's central government was reassessing the role that Shanghai should play in supporting China's economic reform and growth. John McCoy and George Hsu were elected as the first two co-presidents and when Hsu left Shanghai in 1988, Givant was nominated into the role of co-president with John McCoy. The inaugural meeting of the revived organization took place at the Union Building on Yan’an Road in the fall of 1987. The Chamber held its first formal meeting in 1987 at the U.S. Consulate with 35 business community members in attendance.

By 1999, the Chamber had 1,820 members. By 2003, the Chamber had 2,010 members and established another record in 2006 with 3,100 members. Membership broke the 4,000 number during the 2010 Shanghai World Expo, but in recent years, membership size has stabilized in the range of 3,000 members from 1,500 companies. AmCham Shanghai is still one of the largest American chambers outside of the United States. In 2010, the organization took steps to normalize its legal status by creating a wholly foreign-owned enterprise (WFOE) that allows the Chamber to accept online and electronic payments.
