= HAF 604 =

Chinese nuclear component certification

HAF 604 is the certification for components for nuclear power plants in China that have been manufactured outside of China. Exporters of these safety-relevant components need this certification for importing the components into China. The responsible authority for the certification of these components for nuclear power plants is the National Nuclear Safety Administration.

== Regulations ==
The regulations for the HAF 604 certification are the “Supervision and Management Regulations for Imported Civilian Nuclear Equipment” and determine safety requirements for these safety relevant components. Furthermore, it governs the administration for the certification applications from non-Chinese manufacturers regarding the construction, manufacturing as well as installation of safety-relevant components for nuclear power plants. The Regulation also defines the obligatory safety test requirements for the certification process.

HAF 604 should be distinguished from HAF 601, which deals with the regulations for domestic (Chinese) Civil Nuclear Safety Equipment. By May 2013, 191 Chinese companies had already received HAF601 certification, whereas 217 foreign firms had received HAF604 certification. According to a 2013 publication by the US Department of Commerce - Commercial Service and consulting firm Nicobar Group, nearly two-thirds of the foreign firms receiving certifications by that date were American, French, or German firms.

== See also ==
- HAF601
- NNSA National Nuclear Safety Administration
