= Shanghai Waigaoqiao Free Trade Zone =

Special economic zone in China

Coordinates: 31.337°N 121.593°E

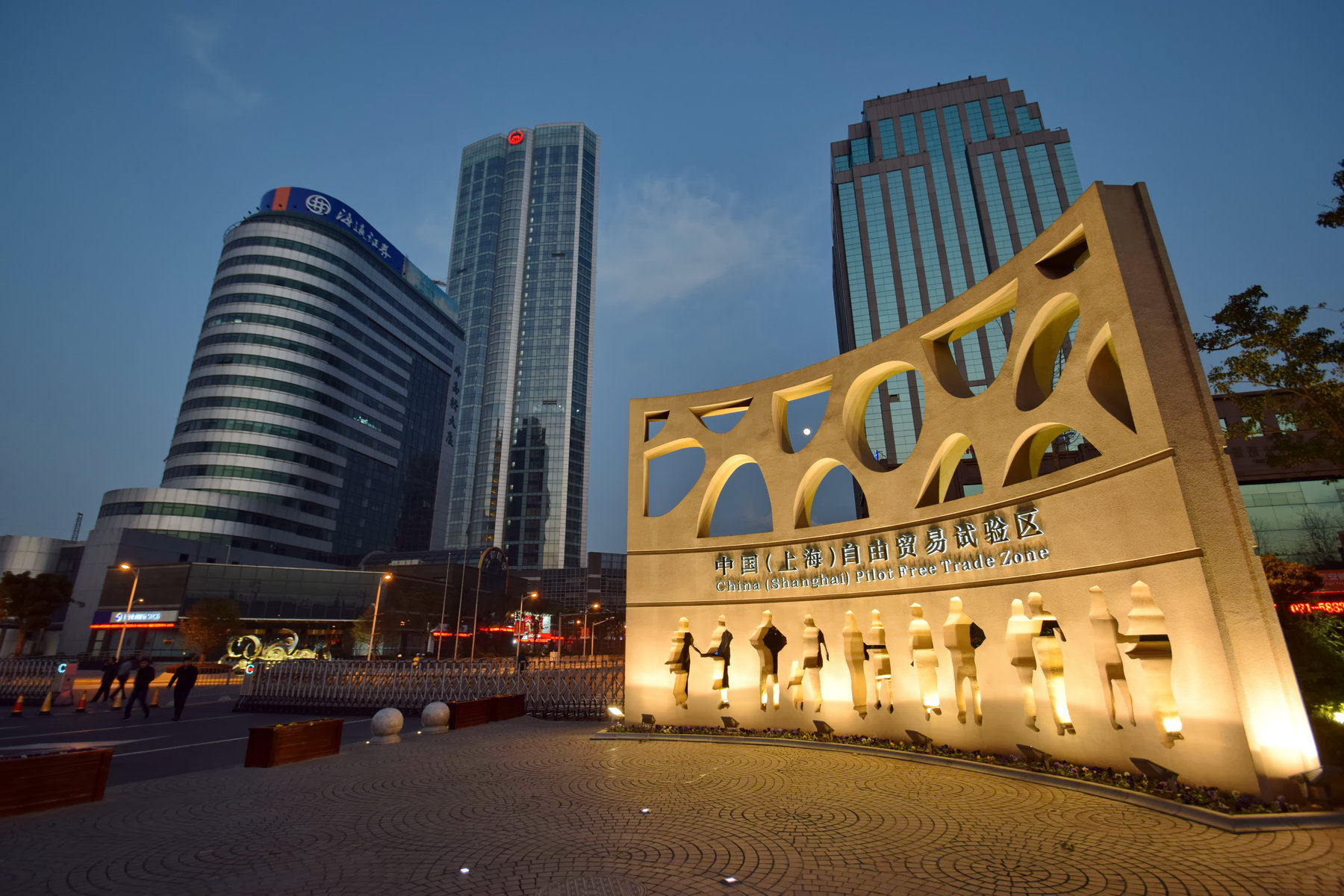

Shanghai Waigaoqiao Free Trade Zone (Chinese: 上海外高桥保税区) was the first Free Trade Zone to be established in China. It is situated in the North East of Pudong District, near the end of Metro Line 6. It was incorporated as part of the newly developed China (Shanghai) Pilot Free-Trade Zone on September 29, 2013.
