= Wholly Foreign-Owned Enterprise =

Legal term in China, a type of enterprise founded in the PRC by foreign investors

- Simplified Chinese: 外商独资企业
- Traditional Chinese: 外商獨資企業
- Literal meaning: Foreign business sole proprietorship
Transcriptions
Standard Mandarin
- Hanyu Pinyin: wàishāng dúzī qǐyè

Alternative Chinese name
- Simplified Chinese: 外资企业
- Traditional Chinese: 外資企業
- Literal meaning: Foreign investment enterprise
Transcriptions
Standard Mandarin
- Hanyu Pinyin: wàizī qǐyè

A wholly foreign-owned enterprise (WFOE, sometimes incorrectly WOFE) is a common investment vehicle for mainland China–based business wherein foreign parties (individuals or corporate entities) can incorporate a foreign-owned limited liability company. The unique feature of a WFOE is that involvement of a mainland Chinese investor is not required, unlike most other investment vehicles (most notably, a Sino-foreign joint venture).

Starting January 2020, per new Foreign Investment Law, WFOE has been abolished and superseded by a new type of business referred to as "foreign-funded enterprise" (外商投资企业). Existing businesses are expected to transition to the new designation within five years.

== Description ==
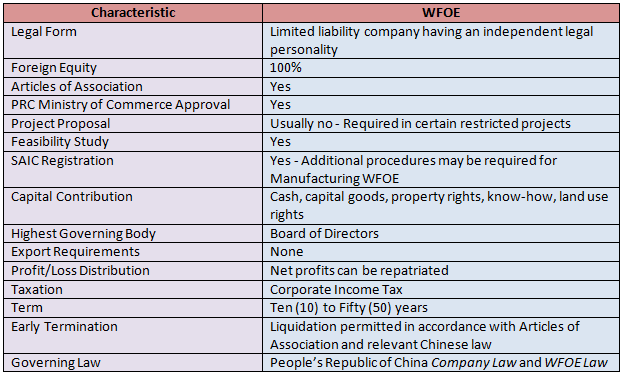
Basic elements of a WFOE (Click to enlarge)

WFOEs may be limited-liability companies, as distinct from corporations, partnerships (limited or general), and proprietorships organized by foreign nationals and capitalized with foreign funds. WFOEs are mostly used by foreign companies to start a manufacturing operation in China. This can give greater control over the business venture in mainland China and avoid a multitude of problematic issues which can potentially result from dealing with a domestic joint venture partner. Such problems often include profit not being maximized, leakage of the foreign firm's intellectual property and the potential for joint venture partners to set up in competition against the foreign firm after siphoning off knowledge and expertise.

WFOEs are often used to produce the foreign firm's product in mainland China for later export to a foreign country, sometimes through the use of Special Economic Zones which allow the importation of components duty-free into China, to then be added to Chinese-made components and the finished product then re-exported. An additional advantage with this model is the ability to claim back VAT on the Chinese manufactured component parts upon export. In addition, WFOEs now have the right to distribute their products in mainland China via both wholesale and retail channels.

Another recent variant (the Foreign Invested Commercial Enterprise FICE) of the WFOE has also come into effect, and are used mainly for trading and buying and selling in China. The registered capital requirements for a FICE are lower than for a WFOE as the FICE does not need to fund plant and machinery acquisitions.

== Advantages ==
WFOEs are among the most popular corporate models for non-PRC investors due to their versatility and structural advantages of a representative office or joint venture.

Such advantages include:

- the ability to uphold a company's global strategy free from interference by Chinese partners (as may occur in the case of joint ventures);
- a new, independent legal personality;
- total management control within the limitations of the laws of the PRC;
- the ability to both receive and remit RMB to the investor company overseas;
- increased protection of trademarks, patents and other intellectual property, in accordance with international law;
- exempt from having to obtain an import/export license for products manufactured;
- shareholder liability is limited to original investment;
- easier to terminate than an equity joint venture;
- simpler establishment than a joint venture;
- full control of human resources.

A key feature of a WFOE is that it allows for any profits made in running the business to be repatriated without prior approval of the State Administration of Foreign Exchange (SAFE). Dividends cannot be distributed and repatriated overseas if the losses of previous years have not been covered while dividends not distributed in previous years may be distributed together with those of the current year. Repatriation of the registered capital is possible upon dissolution of the WFOE. For most WFOE types, paid-in capital is no longer a part of business registration. When the company is registered, no capital verification report is required either.

== Disadvantages ==
The disadvantages of establishing a WFOE include the inability to engage in certain restricted business activities, limited access to government support and a potentially steep learning curve upon entering the mainland Chinese market. As a WFOE is a type of limited liability company, it requires the injection of foreign funds to make-up the registered capital; something unnecessary with a Representative Office. Normally 15% of the total investment needs to be injected within one month after obtaining the business license starting from US$50,000. Regional differences in regulations and practical differences in the application of Chinese legislation can also apply. A WFOE comes with more legal rights than a Representative Office (RO). Consequently, its process of liquidation is more time-consuming and expensive when compared to ROs. The liquidation is divided into four steps and might take up to 12 months (notification of the relevant authorities, setting up a liquidation committee, submission of a liquidation report to the authorities, deregistration of the company and closing of the bank account).

== Taxation ==
- Corporate tax: 15% to 25% (depending on the WFOE's location and industry).
- Income tax: rates up to 35% of business profits.
- Consumption tax:1% to 56% of sales revenue of goods. Export are exempt.
- Stamp duty tax: 1%
- Land appreciation tax: 30% to 60% of gains on transfer.
- Resources tax: 1% to 20% depending on material.

== See also ==
- Foreign Investment Law of the People's Republic of China
