= Negative list of foreign investment in China =

Negative list is a management model of foreign investment established in China and legalized by the Foreign Investment Law of the People's Republic of China, which comes into effect on January 1, 2020. It refers to special administrative measures for the access of foreign investment in certain industries or areas. The Chinese government gives national treatment to foreign investment beyond the negative list, which is issued by or upon approval by China's central government, the State Council. Industries not on the list are open for investment to all businesses and will not require pre-approval by the Chinese government. The first trial version of the negative list was issued in 2016 in four provincial regions with pilot free trade zones (FTZs). It was extended to another 11 provinces and cities in 2017, and a nationwide list was issued a year later. On November 22, 2019, China issued its 2019 version of the unified negative list for market access. It replaces the previous regime of foreign investment administration, in which the government would designate certain sectors as open before a foreign investor could participate in.

== See also ==
- Foreign Investment Law of the People's Republic of China
- National treatment
- Pre-establishment national treatment
