= National Nuclear Safety Administration =

Nuclear safety agency of China

- 国家核安全局

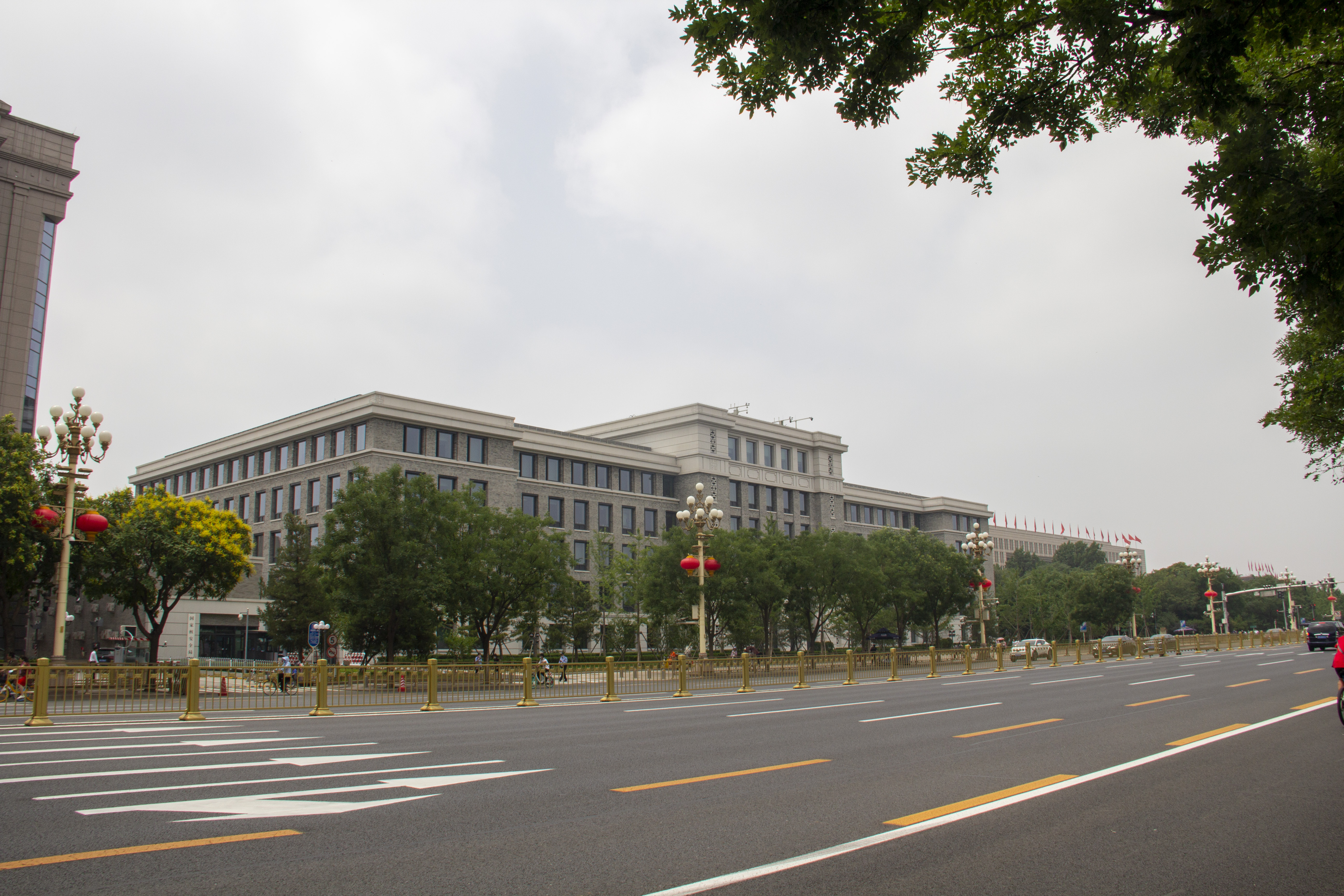

Regulatory agency overview
- Formed: October 1984
- Type: Nuclear safety
- Jurisdiction: China
- Headquarters: No. 12 of East Chang'an Street, Dongcheng District, Beijing
- Minister responsible: Dong Baotong
- Deputy Ministers responsible: Tian Weiyong, Chief engineer on nuclear safety; Jiang Guang, Master of 1st sub-administration; Liu Lu, Master of 3rd sub-administration
- Parent department: Ministry of Environmental Protection
- Parent Regulatory agency: State Council
- Website: nnsa.mee.gov.cn (in Chinese)

The National Nuclear Safety Administration (Chinese: 国家核安全局, abbreviated as NNSA) is a central government agency responsible for regulating nuclear safety, supervision on all civilian nuclear infrastructure in China. It also inspects nuclear safety activities and regulates the approval mechanism.

== History ==
The National Nuclear Safety Administration was established in October 1984. It was a subordinate agency of the State Science and Technology Commission which had independent regulatory of nuclear safety in mainland China.

In 1990, the State Science and Technology Commission became the National Science and Technology Commission but National Nuclear Safety Administration was still under its administration until 1998.

In 1998 the National Nuclear Safety Administration was transferred to the State Environmental Protection Administration.

In 2008, the State Environmental Protection Administration was upgraded to a full ministry of the Chinese state called the Ministry of Environmental Protection and the National Nuclear Safety Administration was retained under its administrative purview.

In 2017, new laws strengthened the powers of the NNSA, creating new "institutional mechanisms", a clearer "division of labour" and more disclosure of information.

== See also ==
- China National Nuclear Corporation – Chinese state-owned enterprise
