= China Railways Test and Certification Center =

China Railways Test and Certification Center (CRCC, Chinese: 中铁检验认证中心) is responsible for certifications of railway products for the Chinese market.

Until 2003 the state-owned enterprise was named Railways Product Certification Center. In 2012, the CRCC enlarged its business scope and included railway equipment in their business portfolio. The CRCC employs more than 300 qualified employees.

== Mandatory CRCC products ==
In 2014, the official CRCC product catalogue includes about 378 products, which all can be check on the CRCC website. Among them are switches, single wagons, locomotives and complete trains. Furthermore, components like signaling equipment, isolators, brakes and brake blocks.

== Certification process ==
For applying for a CRCC certification, firstly, the Chinese regulations (Implementation Rules and GB-Standards) have to be bought at the CRCC. Afterwards the application documents for the respective products have to be handed in at the CRCC. For the third step, companies shall send product sample to the CRCC for receiving the test reports with the test results which are issued only in Chinese. If all product tests are completed successfully, Chinese inspectors will visit the manufacturing site for a 2-day audit. After the factory audit, the CRCC will issue a Certificate of Approval.
