= Foreign Investment Law of the People's Republic of China =

Law of the People's Republic of China

National People's Congress
- Long title: Foreign Investment Law of the People's Republic of China
- Citation: Foreign Investment Law (English)
- Territorial extent: People's Republic of China but excludes China's Special Administrative Regions.
- Enacted by: 13th National People's Congress
- Enacted: March 15, 2019
- Commenced: January 1, 2020

Summary
- A law formulated on the basis of the Constitution to further expand the scope of opening-up, promote foreign investment, protect the lawful rights and interests of foreign investment, standardize the regulation of foreign investment, make new ground in opening up on all fronts, and promote the healthy development of the socialist market economy.

Keywords
- Foreign direct investment, Trade, Chinese law
- Status: In force

The Foreign Investment Law is a law of the People's Republic of China governing foreign direct investment in China. The law was adopted by the National People's Congress on March 15, 2019, and came into effect on January 1, 2020. It replaces the Law of the People's Republic of China on Sino-Foreign Equity Joint Ventures, the Law of the People's Republic of China on Wholly Foreign-owned Enterprises, and the Law of the People's Republic of China on Sino-Foreign Cooperative Joint Ventures.

== History ==
Soon after China's reform and opening up, the country adopted its first law on equity joint ventures in 1979, and the laws on wholly foreign-owned enterprises and cooperative joint ventures were enacted in the 1980s. Over the past decades, they have provided legal safeguards for foreign firms and promoted foreign investment and cooperation in China. As China becomes one of the world's top recipients of FDI, with some 960,000 foreign-invested enterprises and over 2.1 trillion US dollars of accumulated FDI by the end of 2018, the legal framework for foreign investment needed to be updated in order for further reform and opening up.

The unified Foreign Investment Law replaced the three existing laws from the 1970s and 1980s, was adopted at the Second Session of the 13th National People's Congress on March 15, 2019, and came into effect on January 1, 2020.

== Key provisions ==
The Foreign Investment Law calls for the gradual elimination of caps on foreign ownership in key Chinese industries, including oil and gas exploration, nuclear fuel production, and some parts of the finance sector.

The Law's key provisions are as follows:

- It defines "foreign investment" as the investment activity directly or indirectly conducted by a foreign natural person, enterprise, or other organization, including establishing a foreign-funded enterprise in China; acquiring shares, equities, property shares, or any other similar rights and interests of a local enterprise; making investments to initiate a new project independently or jointly with any other investor; and making investment in any other way stipulated by laws or regulations.
- The government implements the management systems of pre-establishment national treatment and negative list for foreign investment. Among the areas on the negative list were investing in the exploration and mining of rare earths, radioactive minerals, and tungsten.
- The competent departments for commerce (Ministry of Commerce) and for investment (National Development and Reform Commission) are delegated with the major responsibility to promote, protect, and manage foreign investment.
- All national policies on supporting the development of enterprises shall equally apply to foreign-funded enterprises in accordance with the law. The government establishes a service system for foreign investment, and provides foreign investors and foreign-funded enterprises with consultation and services in respect of laws and regulations, policies and measures, investment project information, and other aspects.
- The government is not to expropriate any investment made by foreign investors. Under special circumstances, the government may expropriate or requisition an investment made by foreign investors for public interests, in accordance with the law. Such expropriation or requisition shall be made pursuant to statutory procedures, and fair and reasonable compensation will be given in a timely manner.
- A foreign investor may freely transfer inward and outward its contributions, profits, capital gains, income from asset disposal, royalties of intellectual property rights, lawfully obtained compensation or indemnity, income from liquidation, and so on within the territory of China in CNY or a foreign currency.
- The government protects the intellectual property rights and trade secrets of foreign investors and foreign-funded enterprises, and encourages technology cooperation on the basis of free will and business rules. It bans forced technology transfers.
- The government establishes a safety review system for any foreign investment affecting, or having the possibility to affect, national security.

In 2022, the negative list restrictions were lifted. The government also issued a positive list of industries where foreign investment is encouraged.

== Comments ==
Wang Chen, vice chairman of the NPC Standing Committee, said the Law shows China's will and determination to follow through with reform and opening up in a new historical context, and that "it is a full testament to China's determination and confidence in opening wider to the outside world and promoting foreign investment in the new era."

Vivian Jiang, vice chair of Deloitte China, said the Law sends the signal of "greater transparency", and will "boost Chinese market's appeal to foreign capital."

Joerg Wuttke, president of the European Union Chamber of Commerce in China, said the Law puts a "strong emphasis on preventing Chinese entities from forcing foreign companies to transfer valuable technology" in order to do business in China, while improving protection of trade secrets.

In the view of economist Stephen Roach, the Law's call for the phasing out of caps on foreign ownership in various key industries reduces the need for joint ventures in China and promotes direct acquisitions by foreign enterprises.

Jake Parker, senior vice president at the U.S.-China Business Council, said the Law still falls short of "specifying what kinds of trade secret disclosures will be prohibited, and clarifying which kinds of administrative departments the provisions on technology transfer may apply to." It is also "vague on how communication channels between government agencies and foreign entities will be managed, and how feedback will be incorporated."

== See also ==
- Economy of China
- Law of the People's Republic of China
- Ministry of Commerce (China)
- Intellectual property in China
