= Inner Mongolia =

Autonomous region of China

- Autonomous region

Name transcription(s)
  - Chinese: 内蒙古自治区 (Nèi Měnggǔ Zìzhìqū)
  - Mongolian: ᠥᠪᠥᠷ ᠮᠣᠩᠭᠣᠯ ᠤᠨ ᠥᠪᠡᠷᠲᠡᠭᠡᠨ ᠵᠠᠰᠠᠬᠤ ᠣᠷᠣᠨ (Öbhör Mongoliin Öörtöö Jasakh Oron)
  - Abbreviation: NM / 内蒙古 (Nèi Měnggǔ) / 蒙 (Měng)
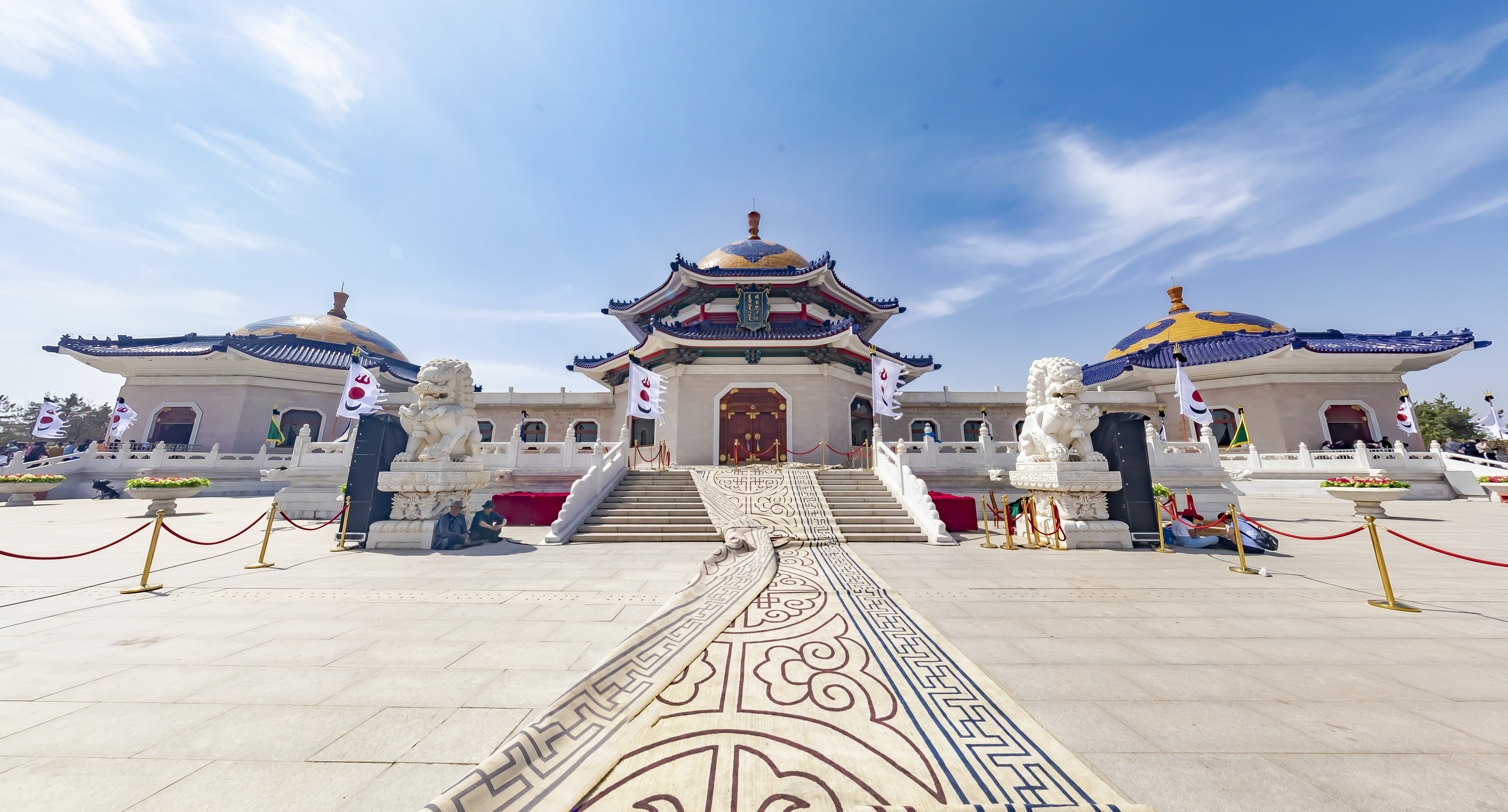
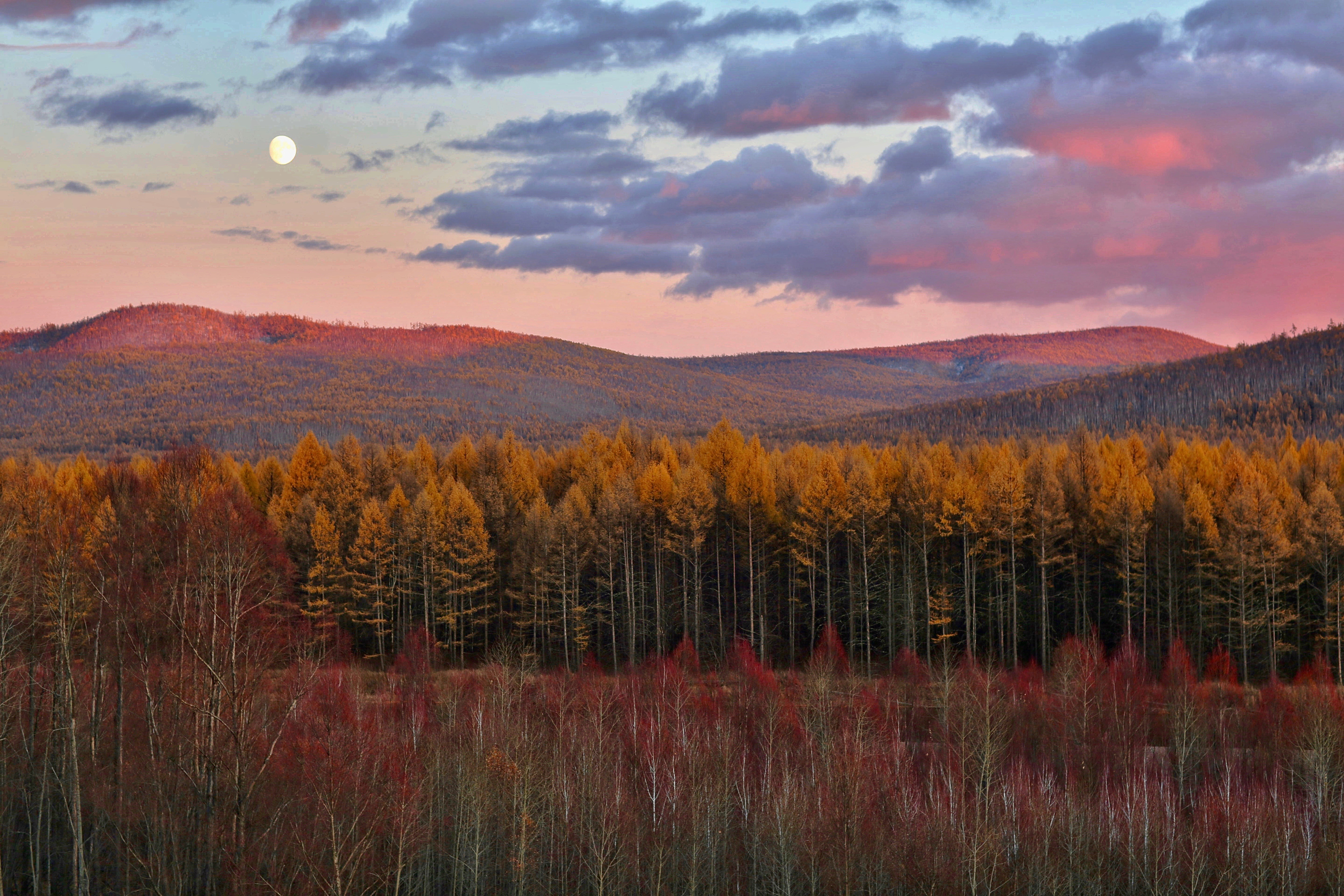
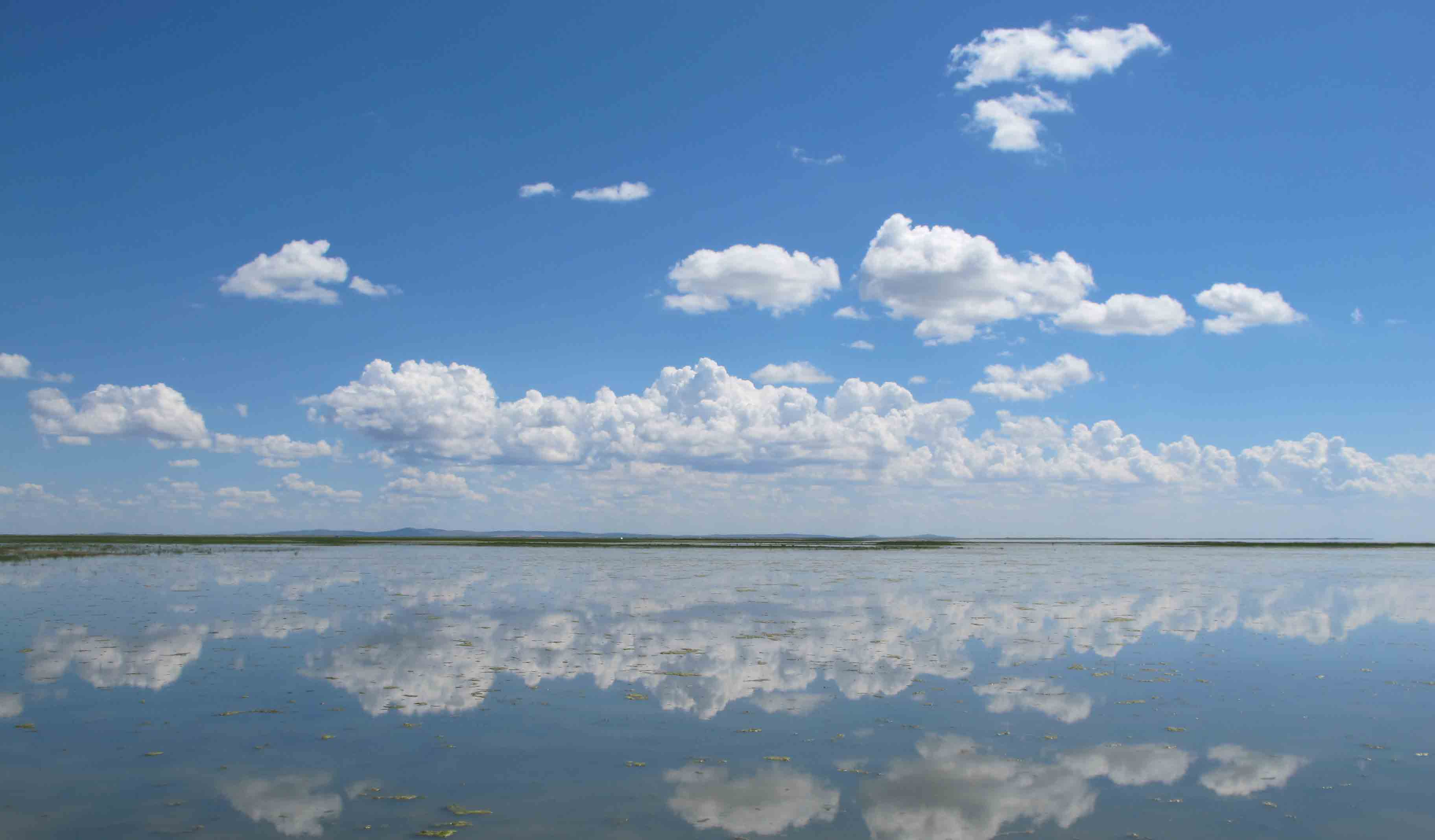
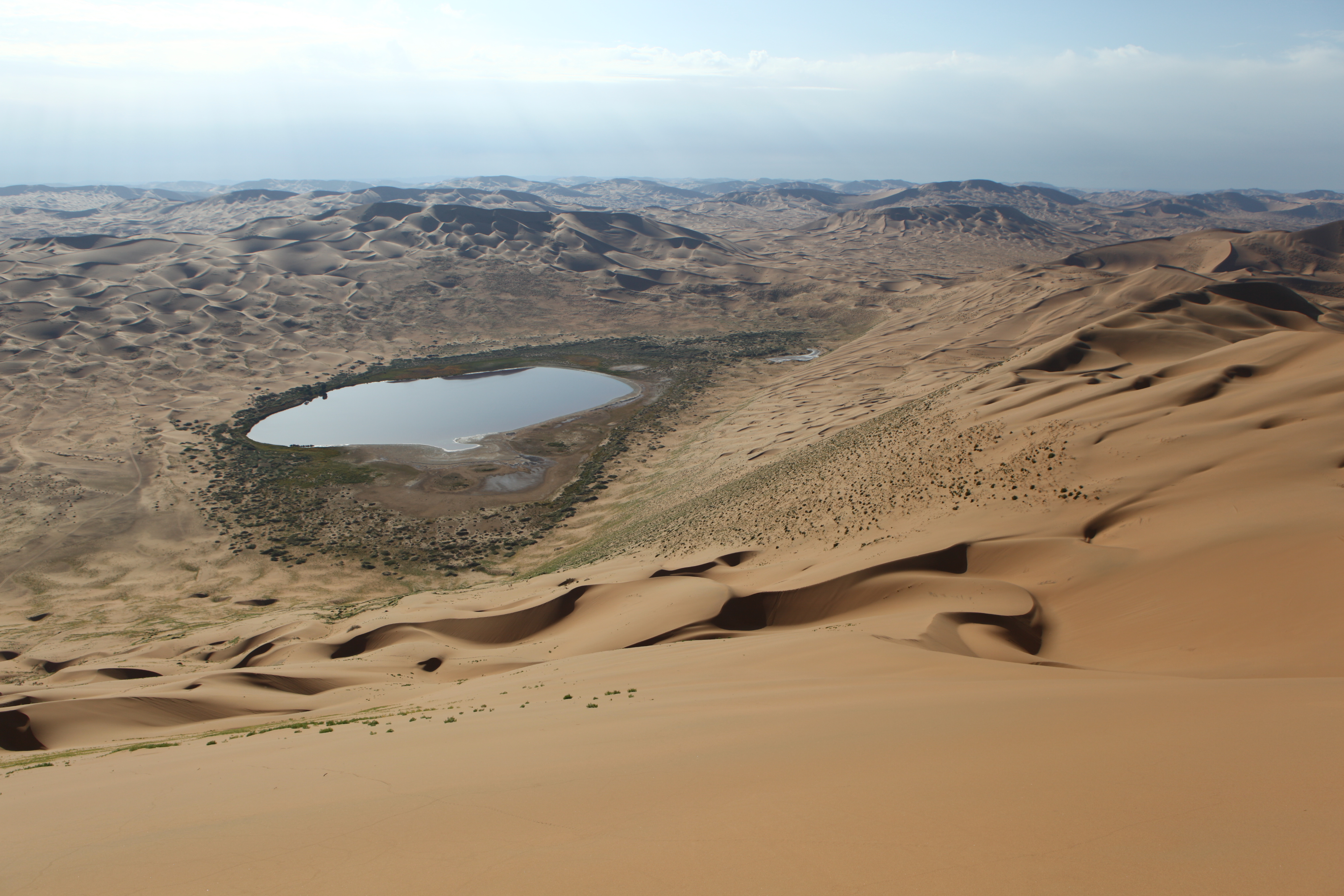
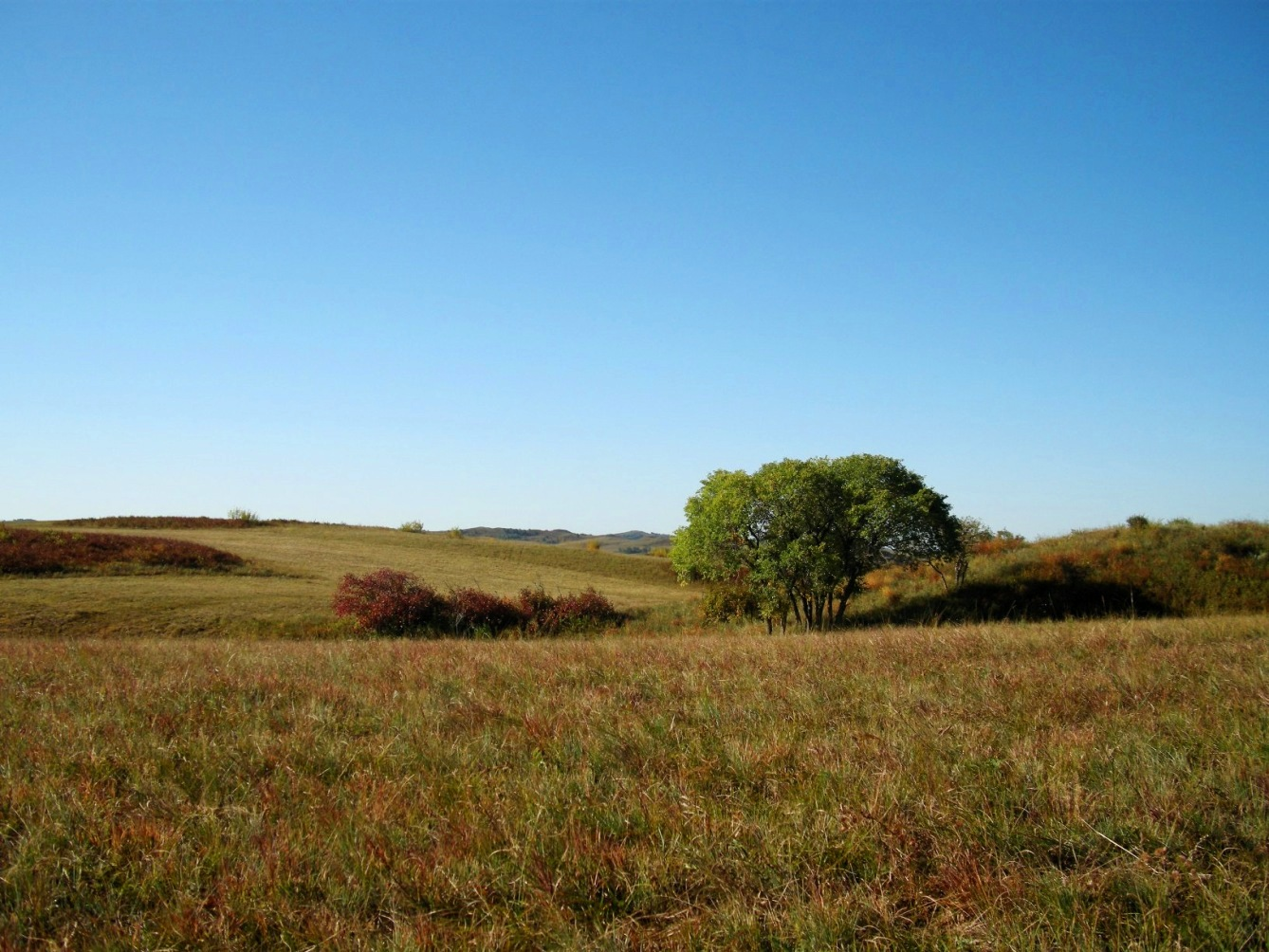
- Mausoleum of Genghis Khan Greater Khingan Range Hulun Lake Bilutu Peak Ulanbutong Grassland

- Location of Inner Mongolia within China
- Country: China
- Capital (and largest city): Hohhot
- Divisions: Prefecture-level; County-level; Township-; level: 12 prefectures 103 counties 1025 towns and subdistricts

Government
  - Type: Autonomous region
  - Body: Inner Mongolia Autonomous Regional People's Congress
  - Party Secretary: Wang Weizhong
  - Congress Chairman: Wang Weizhong
  - Government Chairman: Bao Gang
  - Regional CPPCC Chairman: Zhang Yankun
  - National People's Congress Representation: 58 deputies

Area
  - Total: 1,183,000 km^{2} (457,000 sq mi)
  - Rank: 3rd
- Highest elevation (Helan Mountains): 3,556 m (11,667 ft)

Population (2020)
  - Total: 24,049,155
  - Rank: 25th
  - Density: 20.33/km^{2} (52.65/sq mi)
  - Rank: 28th

Demographics
  - Ethnic composition: Han – 78.7%; Mongol – 17.7%; Others – 3.6%
  - Languages and dialects: Mandarin Chinese; Mongolian; Oirat; Buryat; Dagur; Evenki; Jin

GDP (2023)
  - Total: CN¥2,463 billion (21st; US$349 billion)
  - Per capita: CN¥102,677 (8th; US$14,571)
- ISO 3166 code: CN-NM
- HDI (2023): 0.807 (8th) – very high
- Website: www.nmg.gov.cn (in Chinese); Mongol version

Inner Mongolia
- "Inner Mongolia" in Chinese characters

- "Inner Mongolia" in Mongolian script

Chinese name
- Simplified Chinese: 内蒙古
- Traditional Chinese: 內蒙古
- Hanyu Pinyin: Nèi Měnggǔ
- Literal meaning: Inner Mongolia
Transcriptions
Standard Mandarin
- Hanyu Pinyin: Nèi Měnggǔ
- Bopomofo: ㄋㄟˋ ㄇㄥˇ ㄍㄨˇ
- Gwoyeu Romatzyh: Ney Meengguu
- Wade–Giles: Nei^{4} Meng^{3}-ku^{3}
- Tongyong Pinyin: Nèi Měnggǔ
- IPA: [nêɪ mə̀ŋ.kù]
other Mandarin
- Xiao'erjing: نُوِ مْ‌ٍ‌قُ
- Dungan: Луй Мынгў
Wu
- Romanization: Ne Monku
Yue: Cantonese
- Yale Romanization: Noih Mùhng gú
- Jyutping: Noi6 mung4 gu2
- IPA: [nɔj˨ mʊŋ˩ ku˧˥]
Southern Min
- Hokkien POJ: Lāi-bông-kó

Inner Mongolia Autonomous Region
- Simplified Chinese: 内蒙古自治区
- Traditional Chinese: 內蒙古自治區
- Hanyu Pinyin: Nèiměnggǔ Zìzhìqū
Transcriptions
Standard Mandarin
- Hanyu Pinyin: Nèiměnggǔ Zìzhìqū
- Bopomofo: ㄋㄟˋ ㄇㄥˇ ㄍㄨˇ; ㄗˋ ㄓˋ ㄑㄩ
- Gwoyeu Romatzyh: Ney Meengguu Tzyhjyhchiu
- Wade–Giles: Nei^{4} Meng^{3}-ku^{3} Tzu^{4}-chih^{4}-ch'ü^{1}
- Tongyong Pinyin: Nèiměnggǔ Zìhjhìhcyu
- IPA: [nêɪ mɤ̌ŋkù t͡sɹ̩̂ʈ͡ʂɻ̩̂t͡ɕʰʏ́]
other Mandarin
- Xiao'erjing: نُوِمْ‌ٍ‌قُ زِجِ‌کِیُوِ
- Dungan: Луй Мынгў Зыҗычү
Wu
- Romanization: Ne Monku Zyzychiu
Yue: Cantonese
- Yale Romanization: Noih mùhng gú Jih jih kēui
- Jyutping: Noi6 mung4 gu2 Zi6 zi6 keoi1
- IPA: [nɔj˨ mʊŋ˩ ku˧˥ tsi˨ tsi˨ kʰɵɥ˥]
Southern Min
- Hokkien POJ: Lāi-bông-kó Chū-tī-khu

Mongolian name
- Mongolian Cyrillic: Өвөр Монгол
- Mongolian script: ᠦᠪᠦᠷ; ᠮᠣᠩᠭᠣᠯ
Transcriptions
- SASM/GNC: Öbhör Mongol

Uyghur name
- Uyghur: ئىچكى موڭغۇل ئاپتونوم رايونى
Transcriptions
- Latin Yëziqi: Ichki Mongghul Aptonom Rayoni
- Siril Yëziqi: Ички Моңғұл Аптоном Райони

Manchu name
- Manchu script: ᡩᠣᡵᡤᡳ; ᠮᠣᠩᡤᠣ
- Romanization: Dorgi monggo

Buryat name
- Buryat: Үбэр Монгол; Über Mongol

Kyrgyz name
- Kyrgyz: ىچكى مونعولىيا; Ichki Mongolia

Kazakh name
- Kazakh: ىشكى موڭعوليا; Işkı Moñğolia

Tuvan name
- Tuvan: Övür Mool oran Өвүр Моол оран

Standard Tibetan name
- Standard Tibetan: ནང་སོག་རང་སྐྱོང་ལྗོངས།

Inner Mongolia, (Note: Also known as Öbhör Mongol or Nei Mongol; Chinese: 内蒙古; pinyin: Nèi Měnggǔ; Mongolian: ᠥᠪᠥᠷᠮᠣᠩᠭᠣᠯ, pronounced [ˈɵw̜ʊ̈r ˈmɔɴɢɜ̆ɮ]) officially the Inner Mongolia Autonomous Region (Note: Chinese: 内蒙古自治区; pinyin: Nèiměnggǔ Zìzhìqū; Mongolian: ᠥᠪᠥᠷᠮᠣᠩᠭᠣᠯ ᠤᠨᠥᠪᠡᠷᠲᠡᠭᠨᠵᠠᠰᠠᠬᠤᠣᠷᠣᠨ, pronounced [ˈɵw̜ʊ̈r ˌmɔɴɢɜ̆ˈɮiːɴ ˈoːr̥tʰoː ˈt͡sasəχ ˈɔɾɞɴ]) (IMAR), is an autonomous region of China. Its border includes two-thirds of the length of China's border with the country of Mongolia, as well as a small section with Russia (Zabaykalsky Krai). Its capital is Hohhot; other major cities include Baotou, Chifeng, Tongliao and Ordos.

The autonomous region was established in 1947, incorporating the areas of the former Republic of China provinces of Suiyuan, Chahar, Rehe, Liaobei, and Xing'an, along with the northern parts of Gansu and Ningxia.

Its area makes it the third largest Chinese administrative subdivision, constituting approximately 1,200,000 km^{2} (463,000 sq mi) and 12% of China's total land area. Due to its long span from east to west, Inner Mongolia is geographically divided into eastern and western divisions. The eastern division is often included in Northeastern China (Dongbei), with major cities including Tongliao, Chifeng, Hailar, and Ulanhot. The western division is included in North China, with major cities including Baotou and Hohhot. It recorded a population of 24,706,321 in the 2010 census, accounting for 1.84% of Mainland China's total population. Inner Mongolia is the country's 23rd most populous province-level division. Han Chinese make up the majority of the population in the region; Mongols constitute a significant minority with over 4 million people, making it the largest Mongol population in the world (larger than that of the country Mongolia). Inner Mongolia is one of the more economically developed provinces in China with annual GDP per capita at US$14,343 (2022), ranked 8th in the nation. As of 2021, Mandarin is the region's sole official language. In the region, Mongolian is written in the traditional Mongolian script, as opposed to the Mongolian Cyrillic alphabet, which is used alongside the traditional script in the country of Mongolia (formerly described as Outer Mongolia).

== Etymology ==
In Chinese, the region is known as "Inner Mongolia", where the terms of "Inner" and "Outer" are derived from Manchu dorgi and tulergi (cf. Mongolian dotugadu and gadagadu). Inner Mongolia is distinct from Outer Mongolia, which was a term used by the Republic of China and previous governments to refer to what is now the independent state of Mongolia and the Republic of Tuva in Russia.

Due to the perceived Sinocentric nature of the name "Inner Mongolia", some Mongols outside of China, particularly those in the state of Mongolia and separatist groups in the West, prefer the name "Southern Mongolia". However, this name has not been adopted officially by any government bodies.

== History ==
Much of what is known about the history of the Mongolian Plateau is taken from Chinese chronicles and historians. Before the rise of the Mongols in the 13th century, what is now central and western Inner Mongolia, especially the Hetao region, alternated in control between Chinese farming communities in the south, and Xiongnu, Xianbei, Khitan, Jurchen, Tujue, and nomadic Mongol of the north. The historical narrative of what is now Eastern Inner Mongolia mostly consists of alternations between different Tungusic and Mongol tribes, rather than the struggle between nomads and Chinese farmers.

=== Early history ===
Slab Grave cultural monuments are found in Northern, Central and Eastern Mongolia, Inner Mongolia, North-Western China, Southern, Central-Eastern and Southern Baikal territory. Mongolian scholars prove that this culture related to the Proto-Mongols.

During the Zhou dynasty, Central and Western Inner Mongolia (the Hetao region and surrounding areas) were inhabited by nomadic peoples such as the Loufan, Linhu and Dí, while Eastern Inner Mongolia was inhabited by the Donghu. During the Warring States period, King Wuling (340–295 BC) of the state of Zhao based in what is now Hebei and Shanxi Provinces pursued an expansionist policy towards the region. After destroying the Dí state of Zhongshan in what is now Hebei province, he defeated the Linhu and Loufan and created the Yunzhong Commandery near modern Hohhot. King Wuling of Zhao also built a long wall stretching through the Hetao region. After Qin Shi Huang created the first unified Chinese empire in 221 BC, he sent the general Meng Tian to drive the Xiongnu from the region and incorporated the old Zhao wall into the Qin dynasty Great Wall of China. He also maintained two commanderies in the region: Jiuyuan and Yunzhong and moved 30,000 households there to solidify the region. After the Qin dynasty collapsed in 206 BC, these efforts were abandoned.

During the Western Han dynasty, Emperor Wu sent the general Wei Qing to reconquer the Hetao region from the Xiongnu in 127 BC. After the conquest, Emperor Wu continued the policy of building settlements in Hetao to defend against the Xiong-Nu. In that same year, he established the commanderies of Shuofang and Wuyuan in Hetao. At the same time, what is now Eastern Inner Mongolia was controlled by the Xianbei, who would, later on, eclipse the Xiongnu in power and influence.

During the Eastern Han dynasty (25–220 AD), Xiongnu who surrendered to the Han dynasty began to be settled in Hetao and intermingled with the Han immigrants in the area. Later on, during the Western Jin dynasty, it was a Xiongnu noble from Hetao, Liu Yuan, who established the Han Zhao kingdom in the region, thereby beginning the Sixteen Kingdoms period that saw the disintegration of northern China under a variety of Han and non-Han (including Xiongnu and Xianbei) regimes.

The Sui dynasty (581–618) and Tang dynasty (618–907) re-established a unified Chinese empire and like their predecessors, they conquered and settled people into Hetao, though once again these efforts were aborted when the Tang empire began to collapse. Hetao (along with the rest of what now consists Inner Mongolia) was then taken over by the Liao dynasty founded by the Khitans, a nomadic people originally from what is now the southern part of Manchuria and Eastern Inner Mongolia. They were followed by the Western Xia of the Tanguts, who took control of what is now the western part of Inner Mongolia (including Western Hetao). The Khitans were later replaced by the Jurchens, precursors to the modern Manchus, who established the Jin dynasty over Manchuria and Northern China.

=== Mongol and Ming periods ===
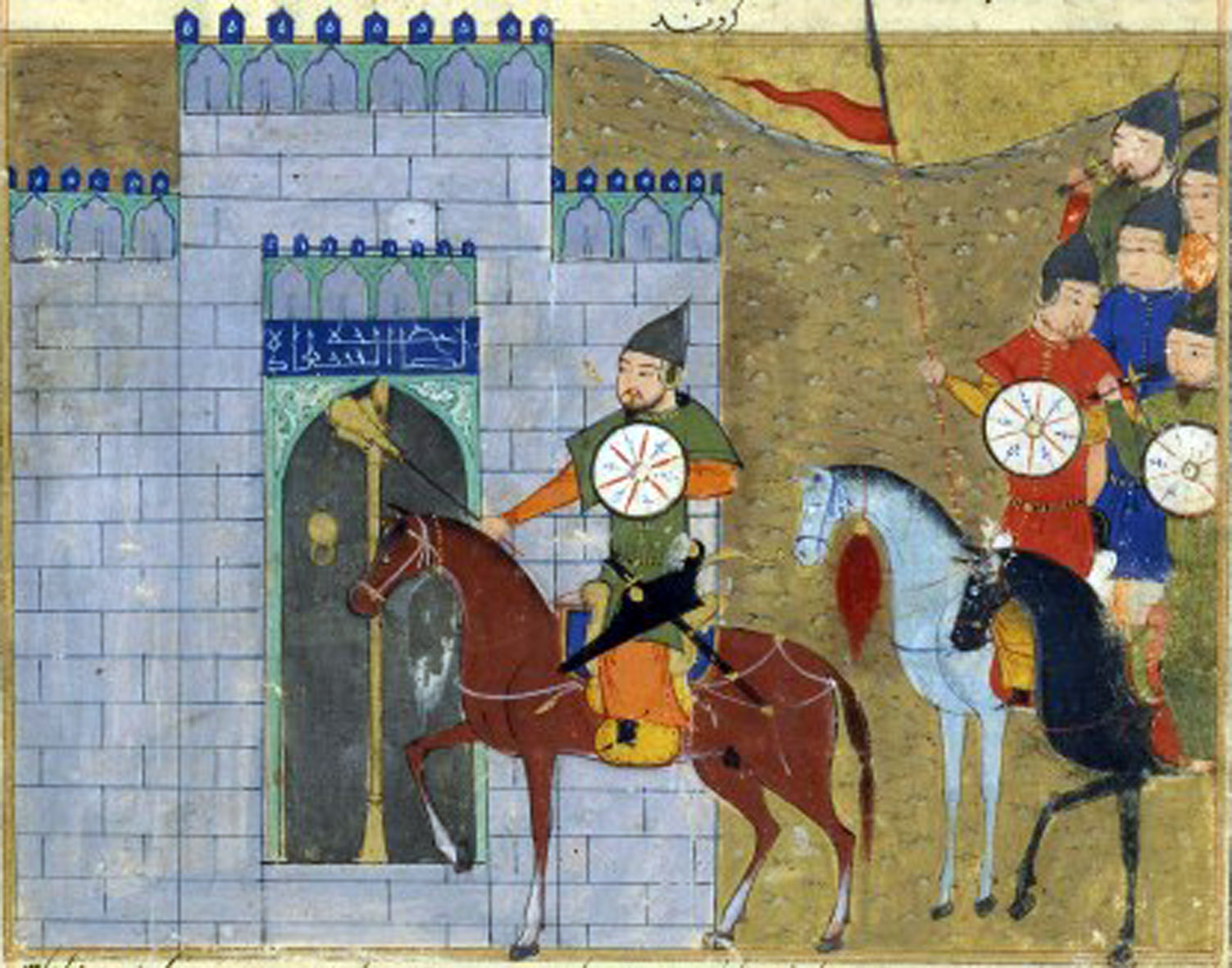
Persian miniature depicting Genghis Khan entering Beijing

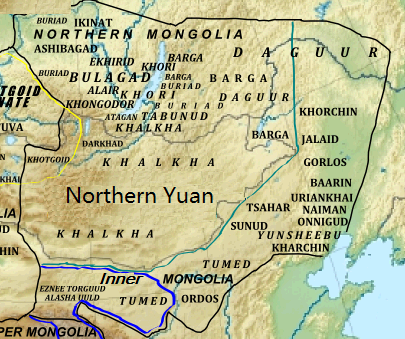
The Northern Yuan at its greatest extent

After Genghis Khan unified the Mongol tribes in 1206 and founded the Mongol Empire, the Tangut Western Xia empire was ultimately conquered in 1227, and the Jurchen Jin dynasty fell in 1234. In 1271, Kublai Khan, the grandson of Genghis Khan established the Yuan dynasty. Kublai Khan's summer capital Shangdu (aka Xanadu) was located near present-day Dolonnor. During that time Ongud and Khunggirad peoples dominated the area of what is now Inner Mongolia. After the Yuan dynasty was overthrown by the Han-led Ming dynasty in 1368, the Ming captured parts of Inner Mongolia including Shangdu and Yingchang. The Ming rebuilt the Great Wall of China at its present location, which roughly follows the southern border of the modern Inner Mongolia Autonomous Region (though it deviates significantly at the Hebei-Inner Mongolia border). The Ming established the Three Guards composed of the Mongols there. Soon after the Tumu incident in 1449, when the Oirat ruler Esen taishi captured the Chinese emperor, Mongols flooded south from Outer Mongolia to Inner Mongolia. Thus from then on until 1635, Inner Mongolia was the political and cultural centre of the Mongols during the Northern Yuan dynasty.

=== Qing period ===
The eastern Mongol tribes near and in Manchuria, particularly the Khorchin and Southern Khalkha in today's Inner Mongolia intermarried, formed alliances with, and fought against the Jurchen tribes until Nurhaci, the founder of the new Jin dynasty, consolidated his control over all groups in the area in 1593. The Manchus gained far-reaching control of the Inner Mongolian tribes in 1635, when Ligden Khan's son surrendered the Chakhar Mongol tribes to the Manchus. The Manchus subsequently invaded Ming China in 1644, bringing it under the control of their newly established Qing dynasty. Under the Qing dynasty (1644–1912), the Mongolian Plateau was administered in a different way for each region:

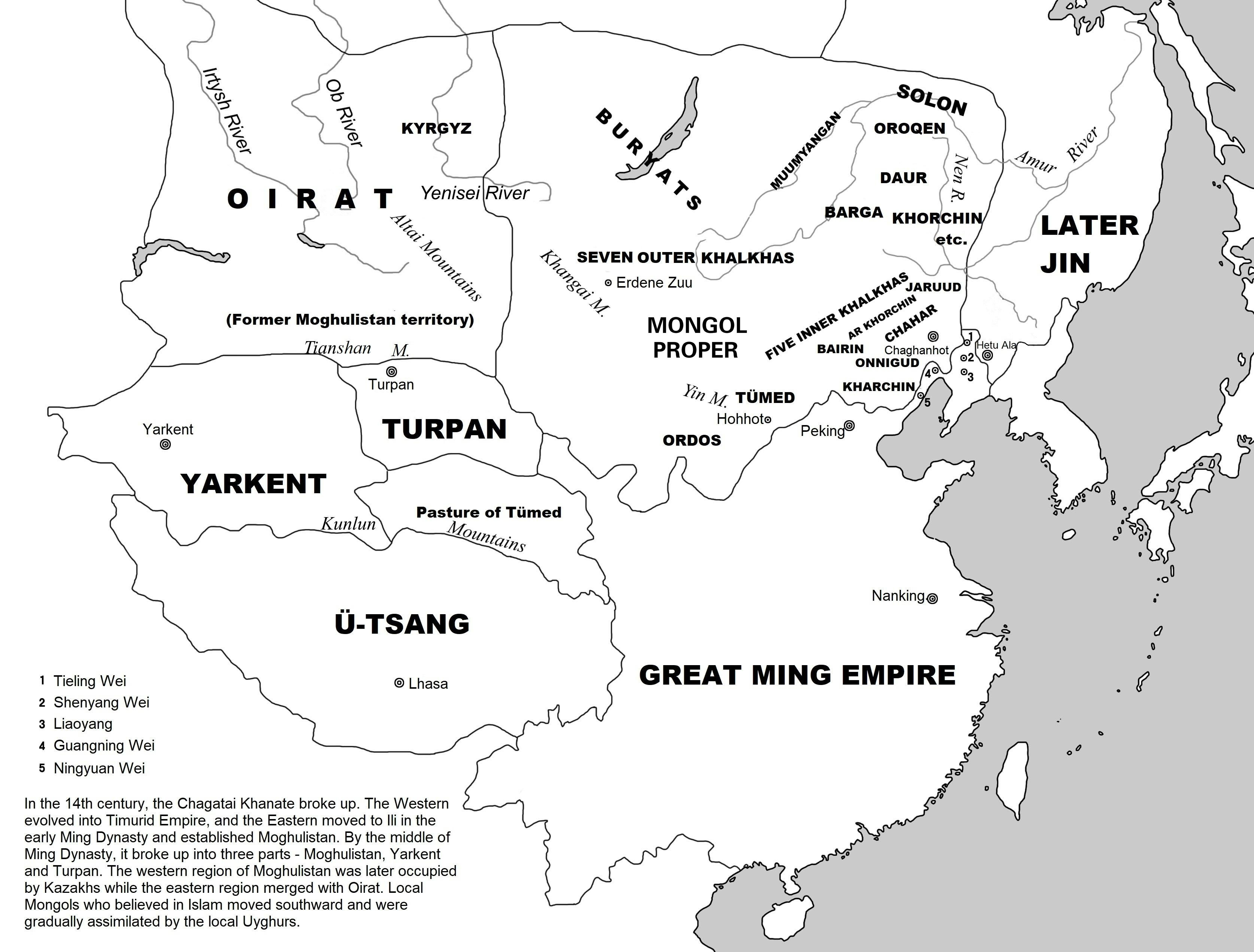
Mongolia plateau during early 17th century

Inner and Outer Mongolia in 1911

- "Outer Mongolia": This region corresponds to the modern state of Mongolia, plus the Russian-administered region of Tannu Uriankhai, and modern-day aimag of Bayan-Ölgii which historically was a part of northern Xinjiang under China's Qing Dynasty. It included the four leagues (aimag) of the Khalkha Mongols north of the Gobi Desert, as well as the Tannu Uriankhai which largely corresponds to modern-day Tuva Republic of Russia, and Khovd regions in northwestern Mongolia, which were overseen by the General of Uliastai from the city of Uliastai.
- "Inner Mongolia": This region corresponded to most of modern Inner Mongolia and some neighbouring areas in Liaoning and Jilin provinces. The banners and tribes in this region came under six leagues (chuulghan): Jirim, Juuuda, Josutu, Xilingol, Ulanqab, and Yekejuu.
- "Taoxi Mongolia": The Alashan Öölüd and Ejine Torghuud banners were separate from the aimags of Outer Mongolia and the chuulghans of Inner Mongolia. This territory is equivalent to modern-day Alxa League, the westernmost part of what is now Inner Mongolia.
- The Chahar Banners were controlled by the military commander of Chahar (now Zhangjiakou). Their extent corresponded to southern Ulanqab and Bayannur in modern Inner Mongolia, plus the region around Zhangjiakou in Hebei province. At the same time, the jurisdiction of some border departments of Zhili and Shanxi provinces also belonged to this region.
- The Guihua Tümed banner was controlled by the military commander of Suiyuan (now Hohhot). This corresponds to the vicinities of the modern city of Hohhot. At the same time, the jurisdiction of some border departments of modern Shanxi province also belonged to this region.
- The Hulunbuir region in what is now northeastern Inner Mongolia was part of the jurisdiction of the General of Heilongjiang, one of the three generals of Manchuria.

The Inner Mongolian Chahar leader Ligdan Khan, a descendant of Genghis Khan, opposed and fought against the Qing until he died of smallpox in 1634. Thereafter, the Inner Mongols under his son Ejei Khan surrendered to the Qing. Ejei Khan was given the title of Prince (親王; qīn wáng), and Inner Mongolian nobility became closely tied to the Qing royal family and intermarried with them extensively. Ejei Khan died in 1661 and was succeeded by his brother Abunai. After Abunai showed disaffection with Manchu Qing rule, he was placed under house arrest in 1669 in Shenyang and the Kangxi Emperor gave his title to his son Borni. Abunai then bid his time and then he and his brother Lubuzung revolted against the Qing in 1675 during the Revolt of the Three Feudatories, with 3,000 Chahar Mongol followers joining in on the revolt. The revolt was put down within two months, the Qing then crushed the rebels in a battle on 20 April 1675, killing Abunai and all his followers. Their title was abolished, all Chahar Mongol royal males were executed even if they were born to Manchu Qing princesses, and all Chahar Mongol royal females were sold into slavery except the Manchu Qing princesses. The Chahar Mongols were then reorganized into the Eight Banners of Chahar under the direct control of the Qing Emperor, unlike the other Inner Mongol leagues which maintained their autonomy.

Despite officially prohibiting Han Chinese settlement on the Manchu and Mongol lands, by the 18th century the Qing decided to settle Han refugees from northern China who were suffering from famine, floods, and drought into Manchuria and Inner Mongolia. As a result, the Han Chinese farmed 500,000 hectares in Manchuria and tens of thousands of hectares in Inner Mongolia by the 1780s.

Ordinary Mongols were not allowed to travel outside their own leagues. Mongols were forbidden by the Qing from crossing the borders of their banners, even into other Mongol Banners and from crossing into neidi (the Han Chinese 18 provinces) and were given serious punishments if they did in order to keep the Mongols divided against each other to benefit the Qing. Mongol pilgrims wanting to leave their banner's borders for religious reasons such as pilgrimage had to apply for passports to give them permission.

During the eighteenth century, growing numbers of Han Chinese settlers had illegally begun to move into the Inner Mongolian steppe. By 1791, there had been so many Han Chinese settlers in the Front Gorlos Banner that the jasak had petitioned the Qing government to legalise the status of the peasants who had already settled there.

During the nineteenth century, the Manchus were becoming increasingly sinicised and faced with the Russian threat, they began to encourage Han Chinese farmers to settle in both Mongolia and Manchuria. This policy was followed by subsequent governments. The railroads that were being built in these regions were especially useful to the Han Chinese settlers. Land was either sold by Mongol Princes, or leased to Han Chinese farmers, or simply taken away from the nomads and given to Han Chinese farmers.

A group of Han Chinese during the Qing dynasty called "Mongol followers" immigrated to Inner Mongolia who worked as servants for Mongols and Mongol princes and married Mongol women. Their descendants continued to marry Mongol women and changed their ethnicity to Mongol as they assimilated into the Mongol people, an example of this were the ancestors of Li Shouxin. They distinguished themselves apart from "true Mongols" 真蒙古.

=== Republic of China and the Second World War periods ===
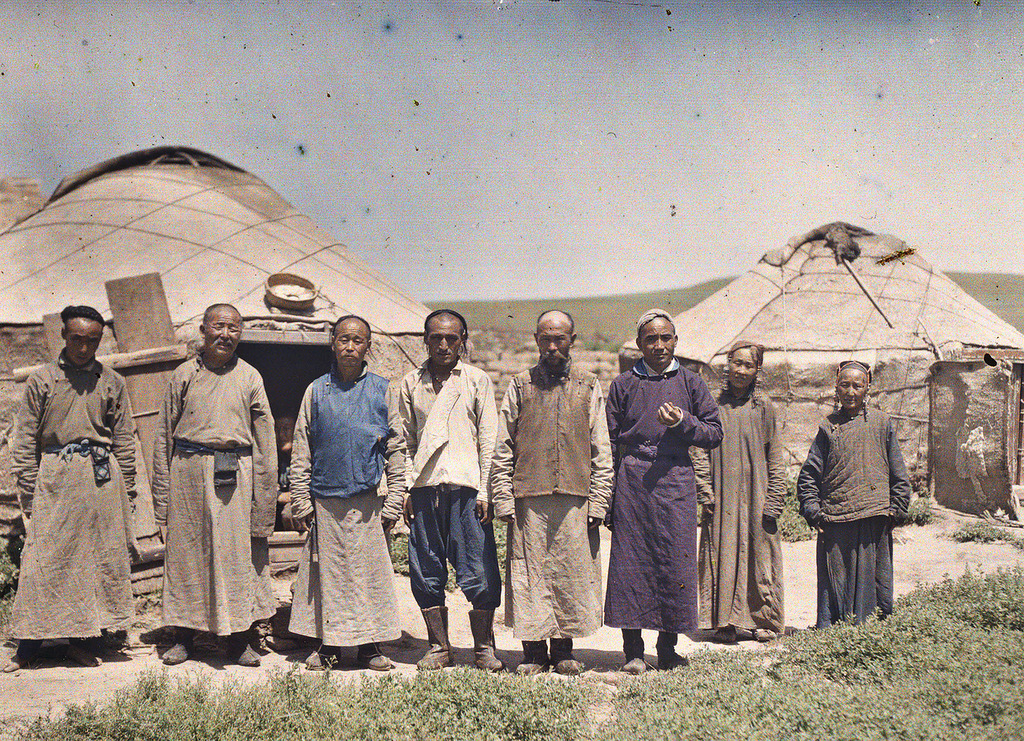
Mongols stand in front of a yurt, 1912

Outer Mongolia gained independence from the Qing dynasty in 1911, when the Jebtsundamba Khutugtu of the Khalkha was declared the Bogd Khan of Mongolia. Although almost all banners of Inner Mongolia recognised the Bogd Khan as the supreme ruler of Mongols, the internal strife within the region prevented a full reunification. The Mongol rebellions in Inner Mongolia were counterbalanced by princes who hoped to see a restored Qing dynasty in Manchuria and Mongolia, as they considered the theocratic rule of the Bogd Khan would be against their modernising objectives for Mongolia. Eventually, the newly formed Republic of China promised a new nation of five races (Han, Manchu, Mongol, Tibetan and Uyghur). and suppressed the Mongol rebellions in the area.

The Republic of China reorganised Inner Mongolia into provinces:

- Rehe province was created to include the Juuuda and Josutu leagues, plus the Chengde area in what is now northern Hebei.
- Chahar province was created to include Xilingol league as well as much of the former territory of the Eight Banners.
- Suiyuan province was created to include Ulanqab league, Yekejuu league, and the Hetao region (former Guihua Tümed territory).
- Hulunbuir stayed within Heilongjiang in Manchuria, which had become a province.
- Most of Jirim league came under the new province of Fengtian in southern Manchuria.
- Taoxi Mongolia, i.e., Alashan and Ejine leagues, was incorporated into neighbouring Gansu province. Later on Ningxia province was split out of northern Gansu, and Taoxi Mongolia became part of Ningxia.

Some Republic of China maps still show this structure.

The history of Inner Mongolia during the Second World War is complicated, with Japanese invasion and different kinds of resistance movements. In 1931, Manchuria came under the control of the Japanese puppet state Manchukuo, taking some Mongol areas in the Manchurian provinces (i.e., Hulunbuir and Jirim leagues) along. Rehe was also incorporated into Manchukuo in 1933, taking Juu Uda and Josutu leagues along with it. These areas were occupied by Manchukuo until the end of World War II in 1945.

In 1937, the Empire of Japan openly and fully invaded the Republic of China. On 8 December 1937, Mongolian Prince Demchugdongrub (also known as "De Wang") declared independence for the remaining parts of Inner Mongolia (i.e., the Suiyuan and Chahar provinces) as Mengjiang, and signed agreements with Manchukuo and Japan. Its capital was established at Zhangbei (now in Hebei province), with the Japanese puppet government's control extending as far west as the Hohhot region. The Japanese advance was defeated by Hui Muslim General Ma Hongbin at the Battle of West Suiyuan and Battle of Wuyuan. Since 1945, Inner Mongolia has remained part of China.

The Mongol Ulanhu fought against the Japanese.

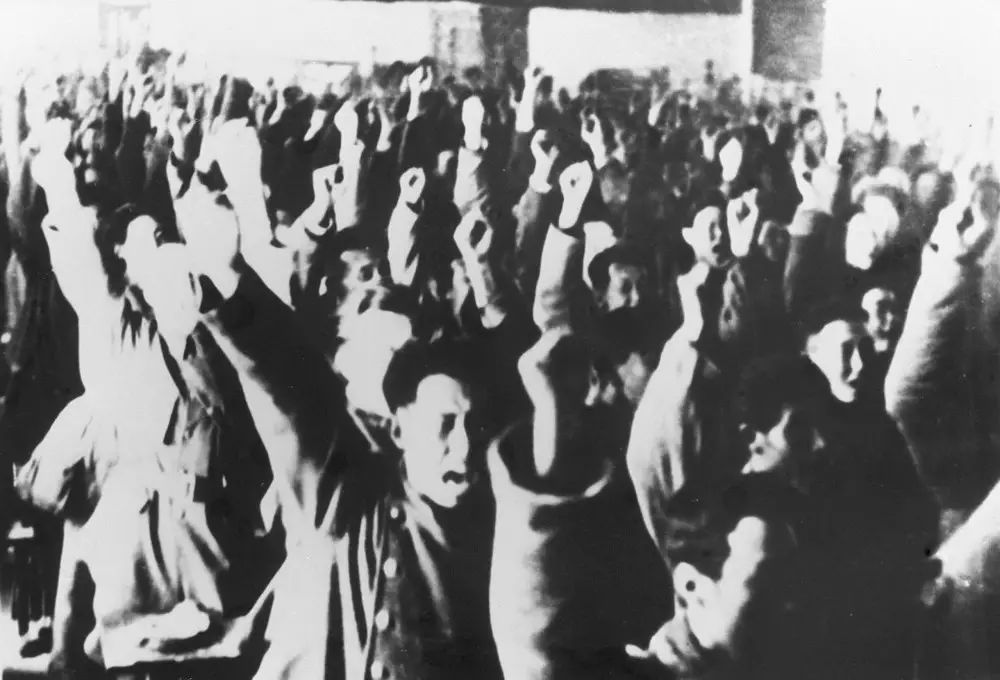
Delegates of Inner Mongolia People's Congress shouting slogans

Ethnic Mongolian guerrilla units were created by the Kuomintang Nationalists to fight against the Japanese during the war in the late 30s and early 40s. These Mongol militias were created by the Ejine and Alashaa based commissioner's offices created by the Kuomintang. Prince Demchugdongrub's Mongols were targeted by Kuomintang Mongols to defect to the Republic of China. The Nationalists recruited 1,700 ethnic minority fighters in Inner Mongolia and created war zones in the Tumet Banner, Ulanchab League, and Ordos Yekejuu League.

The Inner Mongolian People's Republic was founded shortly after the Second World War. It existed from 9 September 1945 until 6 November 1945.

=== People's Republic of China ===
The Communist movement gradually gained momentum as part of the Third Communist International in Inner Mongolia during the Japanese period. By the end of WWII, the Inner Mongolian faction of the Comintern had a functional militia and actively opposed the attempts at independence by De Wang's Chinggisid princes on the grounds of fighting feudalism. Following the end of World War II, the Chinese Communists gained control of Manchuria as well as the Inner Mongolian Communists with decisive Soviet support and established the Inner Mongolia Autonomous Region in 1947. The Comintern army was absorbed into the People's Liberation Army. Initially, the autonomous region included just the Hulunbuir region. Over the next decade, as the communists established the People's Republic of China and consolidated control over mainland China, Inner Mongolia was expanded westwards to include five of the six original leagues (except Josutu League, which remains in Liaoning province), the northern part of the Chahar region, by then a league as well (southern Chahar remains in Hebei province), the Hetao region, and the Alashan and Ejine banners. Eventually, nearly all areas with sizeable Mongol populations were incorporated into the region, giving present-day Inner Mongolia its elongated shape. The leader of Inner Mongolia during that time, as both regional CPC secretary and head of regional government, was Ulanhu.

During the Cultural Revolution, the administration of Ulanhu was purged, and a wave of repressions was initiated against the Mongol population of the autonomous region. Among the victims in Inner Mongolia, 75 per cent were Mongols, even though they only constituted 10 per cent of the population. In 1969, much of Inner Mongolia was distributed among surrounding provinces, with Hulunbuir divided between Heilongjiang and Jilin, Jirim going to Jilin, Juu Uda to Liaoning, and the Alashan and Ejine region divided among Gansu and Ningxia. This decision was reversed in 1979.

Inner Mongolia was underdeveloped until the early 2000s, when huge mineral deposits including coal (such as Dongsheng Coalfield) and rare earth metals were discovered. GDP growth has continually been over 10%, even 15% and connections with the Wolf Economy to the north has helped development. However, growth has come at a cost with huge amounts of pollution and degradation to the grasslands. Attempts to attract ethnic Chinese to migrate from other regions, as well as urbanise those rural nomads and peasants has led to huge amounts of corruption and waste in public spending, such as the Kangbashi district of Ordos City. However, the district's population has steadily increased in the years since, reaching nearly 153,000 people by 2017, a significant rise from 30,000 in 2009, demonstrating the growth and development brought about by these efforts. Acute uneven wealth distribution has further exacerbated ethnic tensions, many indigenous Mongolians feeling they are increasingly marginalised in their own homeland, leading to riots in 2011 and 2013.

On 31 August 2020, protests broke out in ethnic Mongol communities due to plans by the government to phase out Mongol-only medium teaching to be replaced with bilingual medium teaching.

== Geography ==
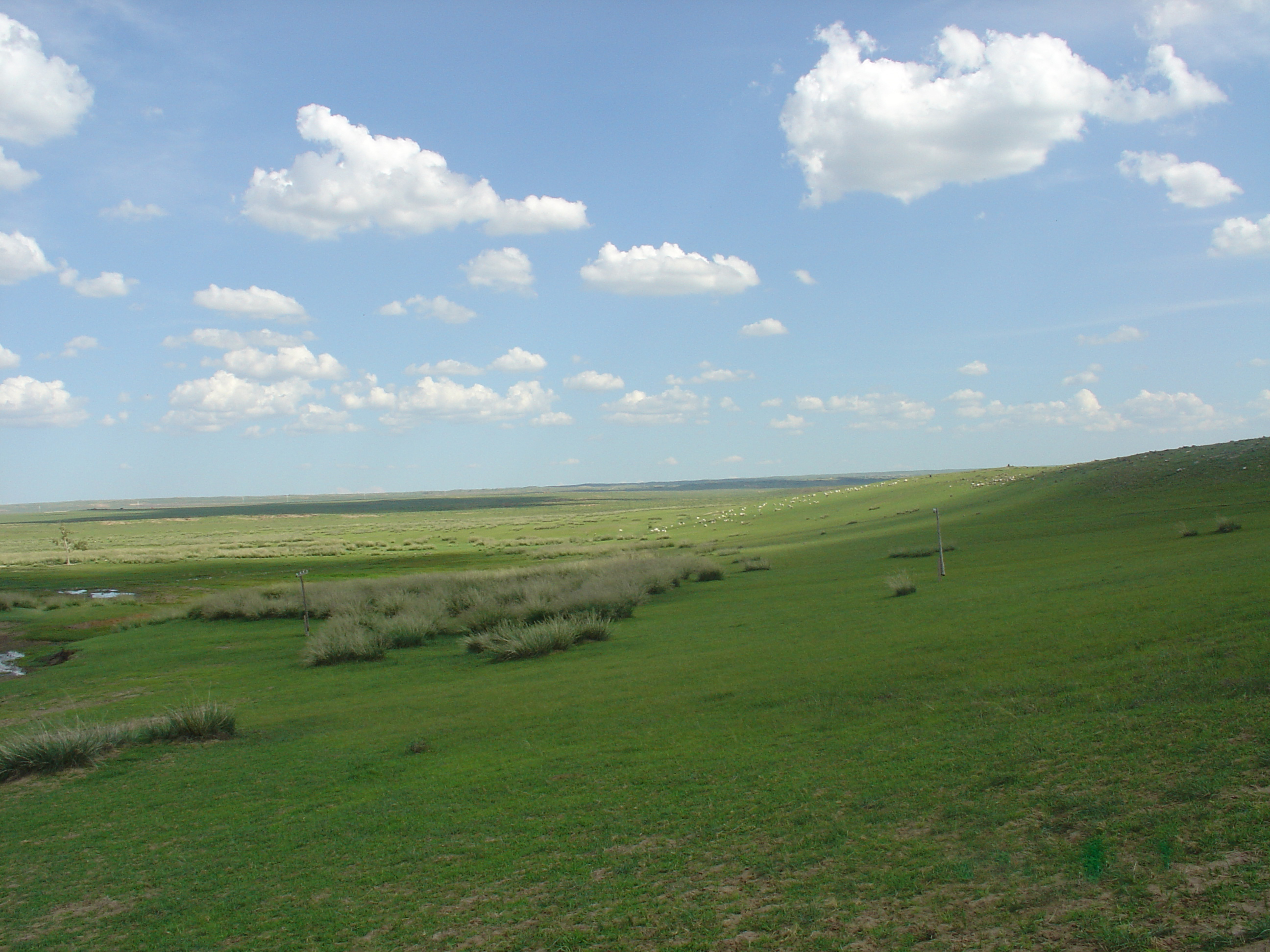
Inner Mongolian steppes

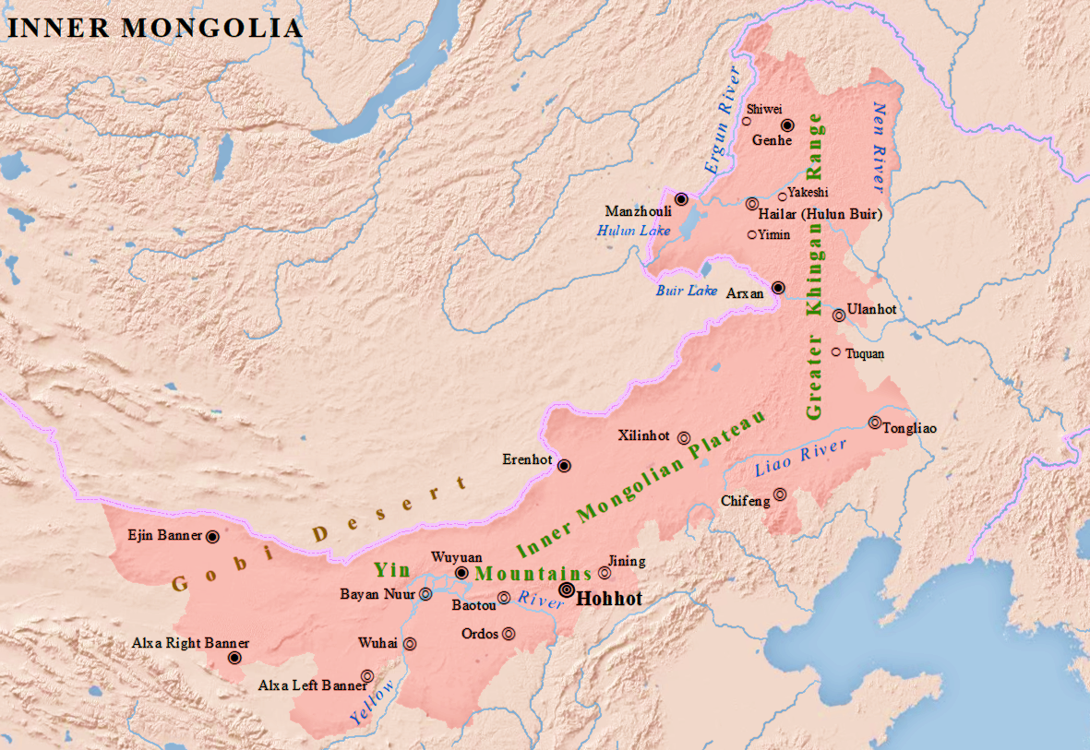
Topography of Inner Mongolia in China

Inner Mongolia is a provincial-level subdivision of North China, but its great stretch means that parts of it belong to Northeast China and Northwest China as well. It borders eight provincial-level divisions in all three of the aforementioned regions (Heilongjiang, Jilin, Liaoning, Hebei, Shanxi, Shaanxi, Ningxia, and Gansu), tying with Shaanxi for the greatest number of bordering provincial-level divisions. Most of its international border is with Mongolia, (Note: The provinces of the State of Mongolia in Outer Mongolia that border Inner Mongolia are, from east to west, Dornod, Sükhbaatar, Dornogovi, Ömnögovi, Bayankhongor, and Govi-Altai) which, in Chinese, is sometimes called "Outer Mongolia", while a small portion is with Russia's Zabaykalsky Krai.

Inner Mongolia largely consists of the northern side of the North China Craton, a tilted and sedimented Precambrian block. In the extreme southwest is the edge of the Tibetan Plateau where the autonomous region's highest peak, Main Peak in the Helan Mountains reaches 3,556 metres (11,670 ft), and is still being pushed up today in short bursts. Most of Inner Mongolia is part of the Mongolian Plateau, averaging around 1,200 metres (3,940 ft) in altitude and covered by extensive loess and sand deposits. The northern part consists of the Mesozoic era Khingan Mountains, and is owing to the cooler climate more forested, chiefly with Manchurian elm, ash, birch, Mongolian oak and a number of pine and spruce species. Where discontinuous permafrost is present north of Hailar District, forests are almost exclusively coniferous. In the south, the natural vegetation is grassland in the east and very sparse in the arid west, and grazing is the dominant economic activity.

Owing to the ancient, weathered rocks lying under its deep sedimentary cover, Inner Mongolia is a major mining district, possessing large reserves of coal, iron ore and rare-earth minerals, which have made it a major industrial region today.

=== Climate ===
Köppen–Geiger climate classification map at 1-km resolution for Inner Mongolia

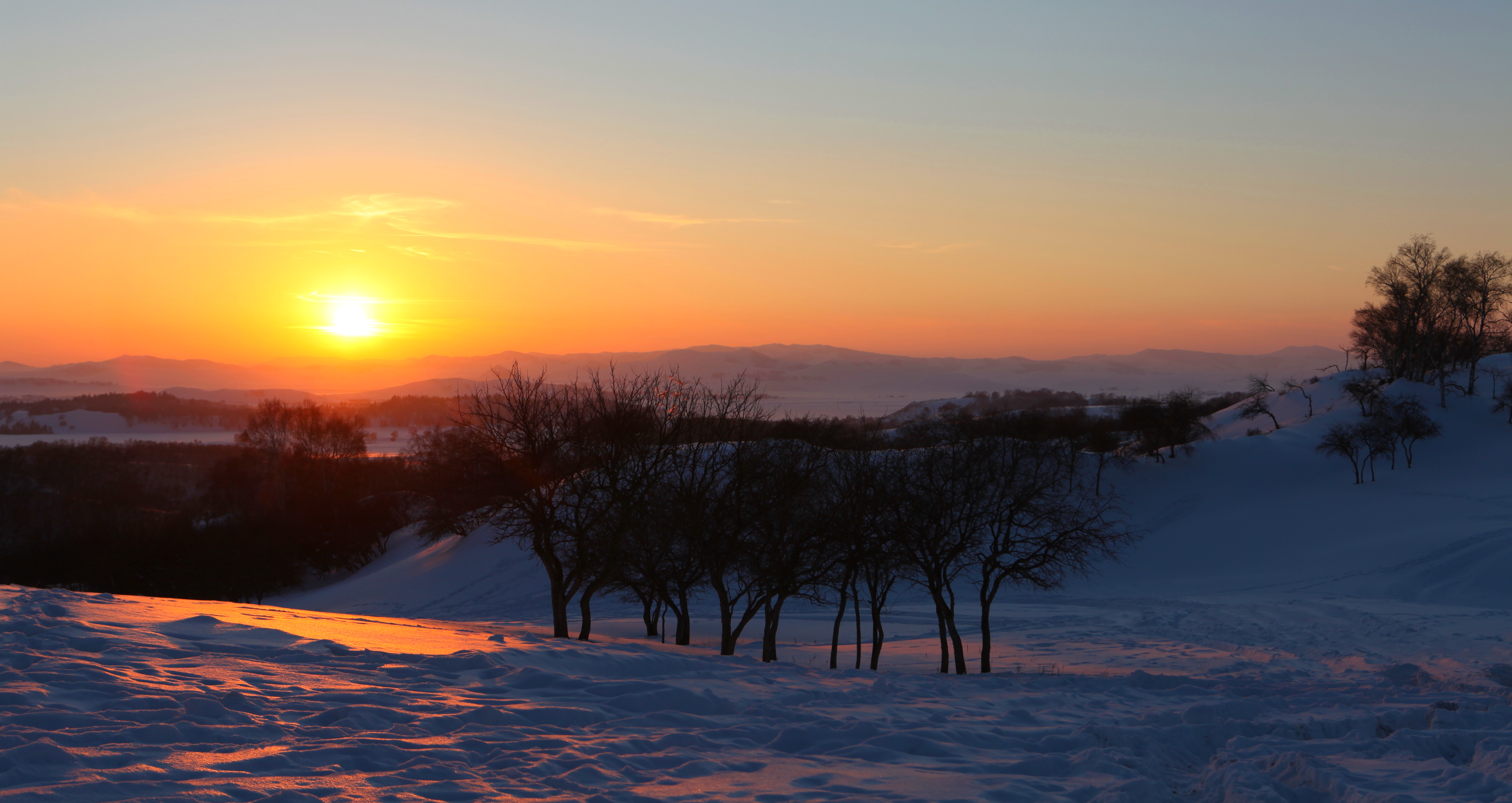
Winter in Ulanbutan Grassland, Hexigten Banner

Due to its elongated shape, Inner Mongolia has a four-season monsoon climate with regional variations. The winters in Inner Mongolia are very long, cold, and dry with frequent blizzards, though snowfall is so light that Inner Mongolia has no modern glaciers even on the highest Helan peaks. The spring is short, mild and arid, with large, dangerous sandstorms, whilst the summer is very warm to hot and relatively humid except in the west where it remains dry. Autumn is brief and sees a steady cooling, with temperatures below 0 °C (32 °F) reached in October in the north and November in the south. Officially, most of Inner Mongolia is classified as either a cold arid or steppe regime (Köppen BWk, BSk, respectively). The small portion besides these are classified as humid continental (Köppen Dwa/Dwb) in the northeast, or subarctic (Köppen Dwc) in the far north near Hulunbuir.

==== Climate crisis ====
The region has increasing desertification and frequent sandstorms, which damages agriculture.

Average daily maximum and minimum temperatures for some locations in Inner Mongolia of China
City	July (°C)	July (°F)	January (°C)	January (°F)
Baotou	29.6/17.1	85.3/62.8	−4.1/–16.8	24.7/1.8
Bayannur	30.7/17.9	87.3/64.2	−3.3/–15.1	26.1/4.8
Hohhot	28.5/16.4	83.3/61.5	−5/–16.9	23/1.6
Ordos	26.7/15.8	80.1/60.4	−4.8/–14.7	23.4/5.5
Ulanqab	25.4/13.6	77.7/56.5	−6.1/–18.5	21/–1.3

== Administrative divisions ==
Inner Mongolia is divided into twelve prefecture-level divisions. Until the late 1990s, most of Inner Mongolia's prefectural regions were known as leagues (Chinese: 盟), a usage retained from Mongol divisions of the Qing dynasty. Similarly, county-level divisions are often known as banners (Chinese: 旗). Since the 1990s, numerous leagues have been converted into prefecture-level cities, although banners remain. The restructuring led to the conversion of primate cities in most leagues to convert to districts administratively (i.e.: Hailar, Jining and Dongsheng). Some newly founded prefecture-level cities have chosen to retain the original name of league (i.e.: Hulunbuir, Bayannur and Ulanqab), some have adopted the Chinese name of their primate city (Chifeng, Tongliao), and one league (Yekejuu) simply renamed itself Ordos. Despite these recent administrative changes, there is no indication that the Alxa, Hinggan, and Xilingol Leagues will convert to prefecture-level cities in the near future.

Administrative divisions of Inner Mongolia
Division code	Division	Area in km^{2}	Population 2020	Seat	Divisions			
Division code	Division	Area in km^{2}	Population 2020	Seat	Districts	Counties Banners	Aut. banners	CL cities
150000	Inner Mongolia Autonomous Region	1,183,000.00	24,049,155	Hohhot city	23	66	3	11
150100	Hohhot city	17,186.10	3,446,100	Xincheng District	4	5		
150200	Baotou city	27,768.00	2,709,378	Jiuyuan District	6	3		
150300	Wuhai city	1,754.00	556,621	Haibowan District	3			
150400	Chifeng city	90,021.00	4,035,967	Songshan District	3	9		
150500	Tongliao city	59,535.00	2,873,168	Horqin District	1	6		1
150600	Ordos city	86,881.61	2,153,638	Kangbashi District	2	7		
150700	Hulunbuir city	254,003.79	2,242,875	Hailar District	2	4	3	5
150800	Bayannur city	65,755.47	1,538,715	Linhe District	1	6		
150900	Ulanqab city	54,447.72	1,706,328	Jining District	1	9		1
152200	Hinggan League	59,806.00	1,416,929	Ulanhot city		4		2
152500	Xilingol League	202,580.00	1,107,075	Xilinhot city		10		2
152900	Alxa League	267,574.00	262,361	Bayanhot town		3		

Administrative divisions in Mongolian, Chinese, and varieties of romanisations
English	Mongolian	SASM/GNC Mongolian Pinyin	Mongolian Transcription	Chinese	Pinyin
Inner Mongolia Autonomous Region	ᠦᠪᠦᠷ ᠮᠣᠩᠭᠤᠯ ᠤᠨ ᠥᠪᠡᠷᠲᠡᠭᠡᠨ ᠵᠠᠰᠠᠬᠤ ᠣᠷᠤᠨ		Öbür mongγol-un öbertegen zasaqu orun	内蒙古自治区	Nèi Měnggǔ Zìzhìqū
Hohhot city	ᠬᠥᠬᠡᠬᠣᠲᠠ	Hohhot	Kökeqota	呼和浩特市	Hūhéhàotè Shì
Baotou city	ᠪᠤᠭᠤᠲᠤ ᠬᠣᠲᠠ	Bugt Hot	Buɣutu qota	包头市	Bāotóu Shì
Wuhai city	ᠦᠬᠠᠢ ᠬᠣᠲᠠ	Uhai Hot	Üqai qota	乌海市	Wūhǎi Shì
Chifeng city	ᠤᠯᠠᠭᠠᠨᠬᠠᠳᠠ ᠬᠣᠲᠠ	Ulanhad Hot	Ulaɣanqada qota	赤峰市	Chìfēng Shì
Tongliao city	ᠲᠥᠩᠯᠢᠶᠠᠣ ᠬᠣᠲᠠ	Tungliyo Hot	Tüŋliyou qota	通辽市	Tōngliáo Shì
Ordos city	ᠣᠷᠳᠤᠰ ᠬᠣᠲᠠ	Ordos Hot	Ordos qota	鄂尔多斯市	È'ěrduōsī Shì
Hulunbuir city	ᠬᠥᠯᠦᠨᠪᠤᠶᠢᠷ ᠬᠣᠲᠠ	Hulun'buir Hot	Kölön-buyir qota	呼伦贝尔市	Hūlúnbèi'ěr Shì
Bayannur city	ᠪᠠᠶ᠋ᠠᠨᠨᠠᠭᠤᠷ ᠬᠣᠲᠠ	Bayannur Hot	Bayannaɣur qota	巴彦淖尔市	Bāyànnào'ěr Shì
Ulanqab city	ᠤᠯᠠᠭᠠᠨᠴᠠᠪ ᠬᠣᠲᠠ	Ulanqab Hot	Ulaɣančab qota	乌兰察布市	Wūlánchábù Shì
Hinggan League	ᠬᠢᠩᠭ᠋ᠠᠨ ᠠᠶᠢᠮᠠᠭ	Hinggan Aimag	Qiŋɣan ayimaɣ	兴安盟	Xīng'ān Méng
Xilingol League	ᠰᠢᠯᠢ ᠶᠢᠨ ᠭᠣᠤᠯ ᠠᠶᠢᠮᠠᠭ	Xiliin'gol Aimag	Sili-yin ɣool ayimaɣ	锡林郭勒盟	Xīlínguōlè Méng
Alxa League	ᠠᠯᠠᠱᠠᠨ ᠠᠶᠢᠮᠠᠭ	Alxa Aimag	Alaša ayimaɣ	阿拉善盟	Ālāshàn Méng

These prefecture-level divisions are in turn subdivided into 102 county-level divisions, including 22 districts, 11 county-level cities, 17 counties, 49 banners, and 3 autonomous banners. Those are in turn divided into 1425 township-level divisions, including 532 towns, 407 townships, 277 sums, eighteen ethnic townships, one ethnic sum, and 190 subdistricts. At the end of 2017, the total population of Inner-Mongolia is 25.29 million.

Population by urban areas of prefecture & county cities
#	Cities	2020 Urban area	2010 Urban area	2020 City proper
1	Hohhot	2,237,249	1,497,110	3,446,100
2	Baotou	1,949,876	1,900,373	2,709,378
3	Chifeng	1,093,068	902,285	4,035,967
4	Ordos	671,048	510,242 (Note: New district established after 2010 census: Kangbashi from a part of Dongsheng. The new district is included in the urban area count.)	2,153,638
5	Wuhai	530,877	502,704	556,621
6	Tongliao	480,059	540,338	2,873,168
7	Bayannur	413,117	354,507	1,538,715
8	Ulanqab	394,269	319,723	1,706,328
9	Hulunbuir	354,442	327,384 (Note: New district established after 2010 census: Jalainur from a part of Manzhouli CLC. The new district not included in the urban area count of the pre-expanded city.)	2,242,875
10	Xilinhot	327,112	214,382	part of Xilingol League
11	Ulanhot	318,009	276,406	part of Hinggan League
12	Yakeshi	239,742	338,275	see Hulunbuir
13	Zalantun	174,049	167,493	see Hulunbuir
14	Manzhouli	150,508	148,460	see Hulunbuir
15	Holingol	130,239	101,496	see Tongliao
16	Fengzhen	122,193	123,811	see Ulanqab
17	Erenhot	74,252	71,455	part of Xilingol League
18	Genhe	71,164	89,194	see Hulunbuir
19	Jalainur (Note: Jalainur is a satellite urban area separated from Hulunbuir (Hailar) and it is not included in the urban area count.)	84,424		see Kunming
20	Ergun	54,164	55,076	see Hulunbuir
21	Arxan	29,045	55,770	part of Hinggan League

== Economy ==
Farming of crops such as wheat takes precedence along the river valleys. In the more arid grasslands, herding of goats, sheep and so on is a traditional method of subsistence. Forestry and hunting are somewhat important in the Greater Khingan ranges in the east. Reindeer herding is carried out by Evenks in the Evenk Autonomous Banner. More recently, growing grapes and winemaking have become an economic factor in the Wuhai area.

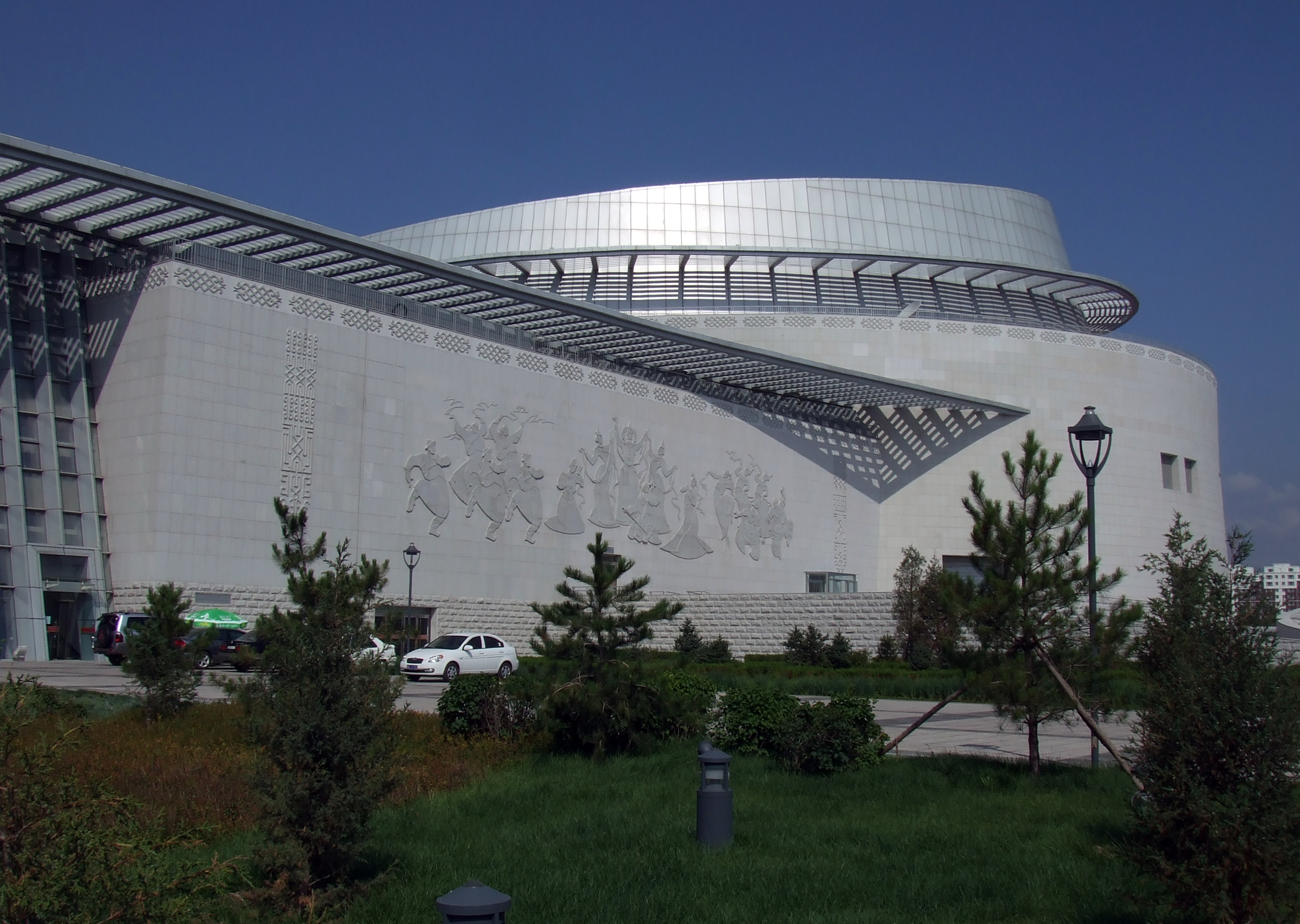
Theater in Hohhot

Mining-related industries are a major part of Inner Mongolia's economy. Inner Mongolia has an abundance of resources especially coal, cashmere, natural gas, rare-earth elements, and has more deposits of naturally occurring niobium, zirconium and beryllium than any other province-level region in China. The region is also a source of crude oil, with sites such as the Xifeng oil field producing tens of thousands of barrels per day. However, in the past, the exploitation and utilisation of resources were rather inefficient, which resulted in poor returns from rich resources. Inner Mongolia is also an important coal production base, with more than a quarter of the world's coal reserves located in the province. It plans to double annual coal output by 2010 (from the 2005 volume of 260 million tons) to 500 million tons of coal a year.

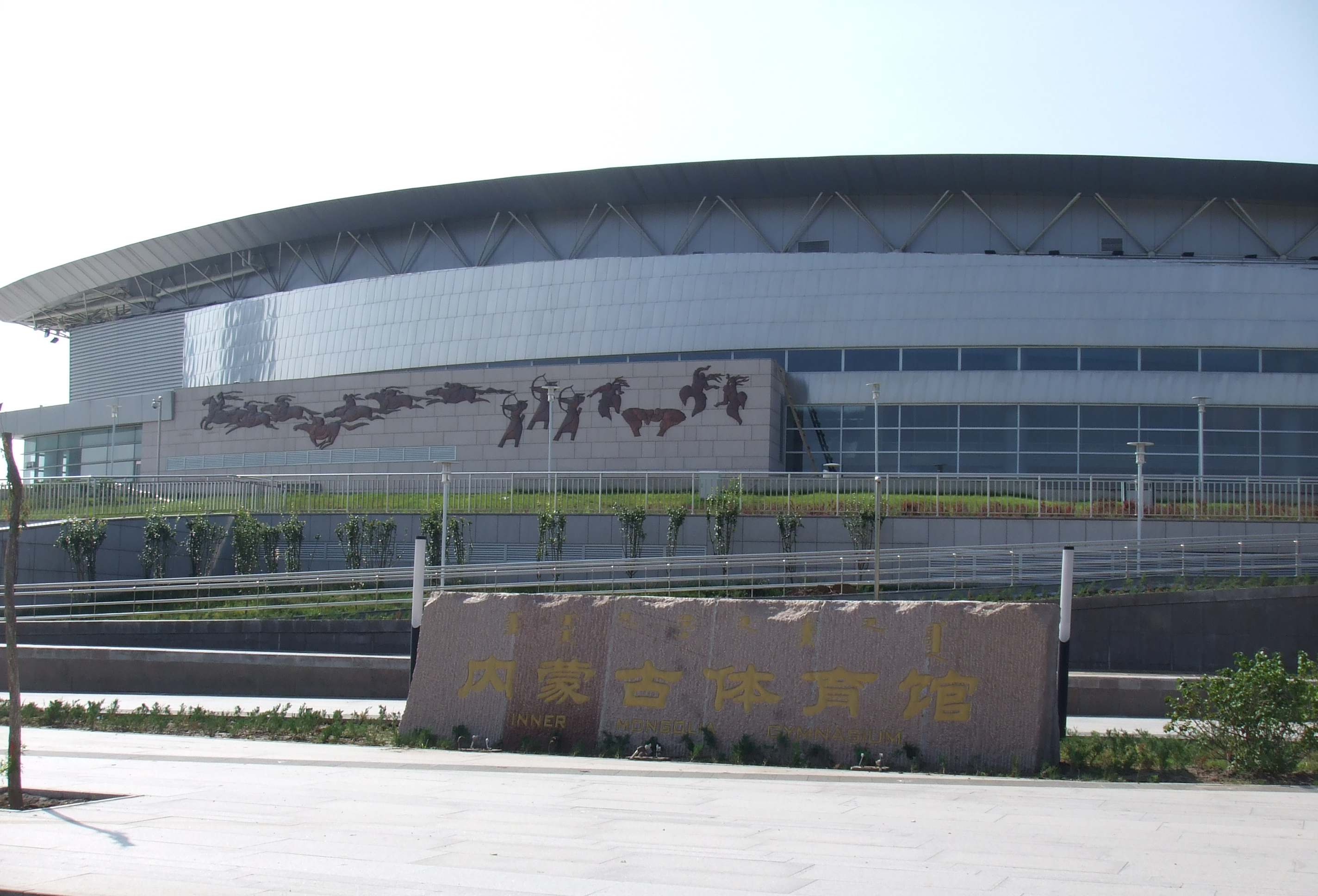
Inner Mongolia Gymnasium

Industry in Inner Mongolia has grown up mainly around coal, power generation, forestry-related industries, and related industries. Inner Mongolia now encourages six competitive industries: energy, chemicals, metallurgy, equipment manufacturing, processing of farm (including dairy) produce, and high technology. Well-known Inner Mongolian enterprises include companies such as Erdos Group, Yili, and Mengniu. As with much of China, economic growth has led to a boom in construction, including new commercial development and large apartment complexes.

The GDP of Inner Mongolia in 2022 was CN¥2.3 trillion (US$344 billion in nominal), with an average annual increase of 10% from the period 2010–2015. Its per capita GDP was CN¥96,474 (US$14,343 in nominal), ranking 8th among all the 31 provincial divisions of China. The primary, secondary and tertiary industries contributed ¥265 billion ($39.45 billion), ¥1.12 trillion ($167.1 billion) and ¥926 billion ($137.7 billion) to the GDP respectively.

In addition to its large reserves of natural resources, Inner Mongolia also has the largest usable wind power capacity in China thanks to strong winds which develop in the province's grasslands. Some private companies have set up wind parks in parts of Inner Mongolia such as Bailingmiao, Hutengliang and Zhouzi.

East of Jilantai, Inner Mongolia, there is a ballistic missile training area used by the People's Liberation Army Rocket Force (PLARF) to train missile crews for mobile missile launchers, their support vehicles, and silo-based ballistic missiles.

=== Economic and Technological Development Zones ===
- Baotou National Rare-Earth Hi-Tech Industrial Development Zone
- Erenhot Border Economic Cooperation Area
- Hohhot Export Processing Zone

Hohhot Export Processing Zone was established 21 June 2002 by the State Council, which is located in the west of the Hohhot, with a planning area of 2.2 km^{2} (0.85 sq mi). Industries encouraged in the export processing zone include Electronics Assembly & Manufacturing, Telecommunications Equipment, Garment and Textiles Production, Trading and Distribution, Biotechnology/Pharmaceuticals, Food/Beverage Processing, Instruments & Industrial Equipment Production, Medical Equipment and Supplies, Shipping/Warehousing/Logistics, Heavy Industry.

- Hohhot Economic and Technological Development Zone
- Hohhot Export Processing Zone
- Manzhouli Border Economic Cooperation Area

== Transport ==
=== Railway ===
Lines wholly or partly in Inner Mongolia include:

- Beijing–Baotou railway (Jingbao railway)
- Baotou–Lanzhou railway
- Beijing–Tongliao railway
- Harbin–Manzhouli railway
- Jiayuguan–Ceke railway
- Jining–Tongliao railway
- Linhe–Ceke railway
- Nenjiang–Greater Khingan Forest railway
- Tongliao–Ranghulu railway

Railway stations in Inner Mongolia include:

- List of stations on Jingbao railway

== Government and politics ==
Under the Constitution of China, articles 112–122, autonomous regions have limited autonomy in both the political and economic arena. Autonomous regions have more discretion in administering economic policy in the region in accordance with national guidelines. Structurally, the Chairman—who legally must be a Mongol—is always kept in check by the Communist Party Regional Committee Secretary, who is usually from a different part of China (to reduce corruption) and Han Chinese. As of May 2023, the current party secretary is Sun Shaocheng. The Inner Mongolian government and its subsidiaries follow roughly the same structure as that of a Chinese province. With regards to economic policy, as a part of increased federalism characteristics in China, Inner Mongolia has become more independent in implementing its own economic roadmap.

Because of Inner Mongolia's status as an autonomous region, Mongols, as the titular nationality, enjoy preferential policies in education and employment, including a guarantee that the chairman of the regional government will be of the Mongol ethnic group. The percentage of Mongols in the Inner Mongolia People's Congress has been fixed at 37–39 percent since 1954. Thus, the Mongols are vastly overrepresented compared to their percentage of the population while still remaining a minority in the government and legislature.

The local administration of Inner Mongolia contains a parallel system of leagues, banners and sums, in addition to the system of municipalities, counties and townships used in the rest of China. While their structures are identical, the former units must be headed by Mongols. The sums are almost always majority Mongol, and are dominated by Mongolian-speaking cadres in pastoral areas.

The position of Chairman of Inner Mongolia alternates between Khorchin Mongols in the east and Tumed Mongols in the west. Since the end of the Cultural Revolution, this convention has not been broken. The family of Ulanhu has retained influence in regional politics ever since the founding the People's Republic. His son Buhe and granddaughter Bu Xiaolin both served as Chairman of the region.

== Demographics ==
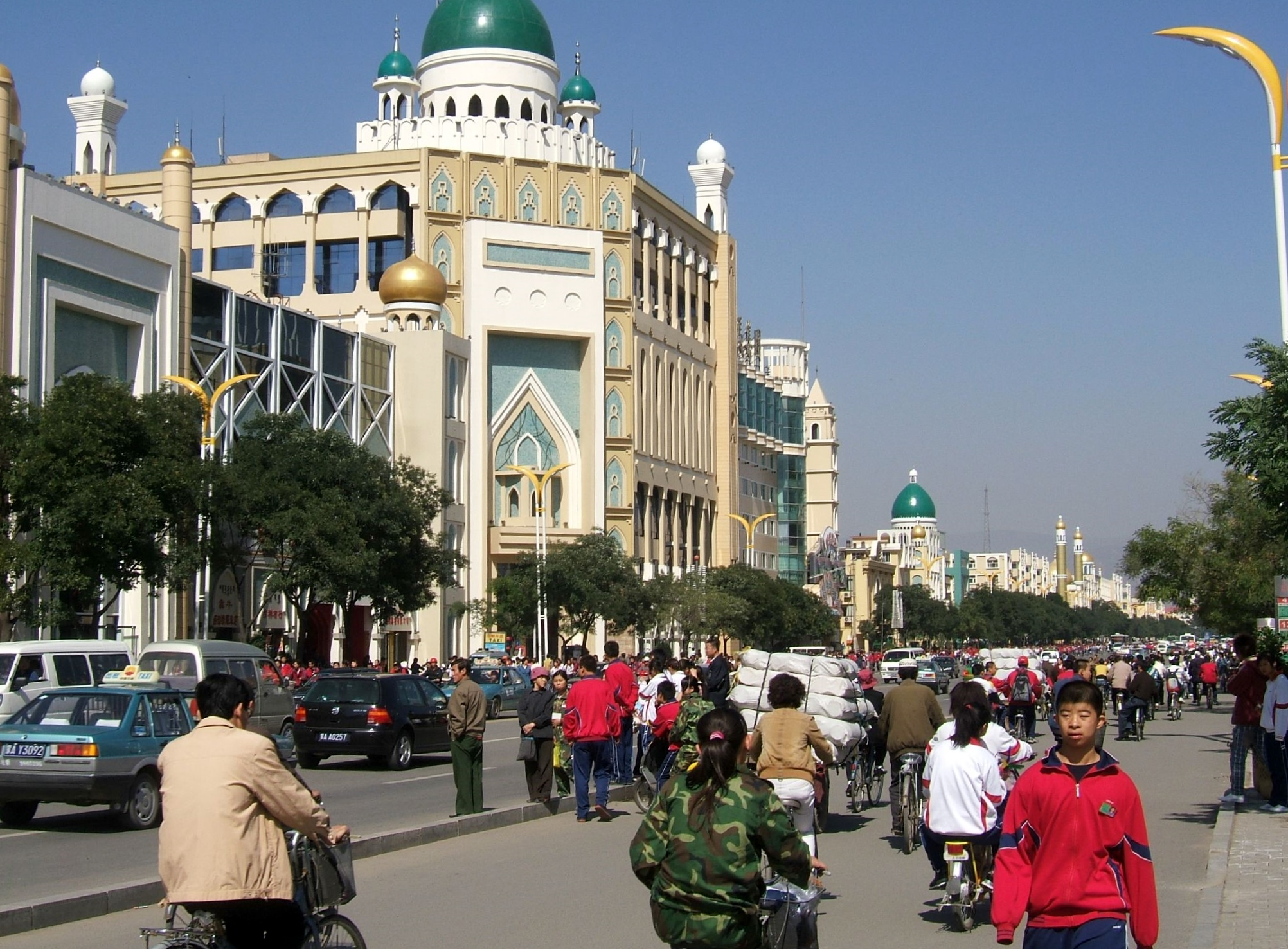
Muslim-themed Street in Hohhot

Historical population
Year	Pop.	±% p.a.
1954	6,100,104	—
1964	12,348,638	+7.31%
1982	19,274,279	+2.50%
1990	21,456,798	+1.35%
2000	23,323,347	+0.84%
2010	24,706,321	+0.58%
2020	24,049,155	−0.27%
Established in 1947 from dissolution of Xing'an Province, Qahar Province, parts of Rehe Province, and Suiyuan Province; parts of Ningxia Province were incorporated into Inner Mongolia AR.

County-level ethnicity map of Inner Mongolia as of 2020

When the autonomous region was established in 1947, Han Chinese comprised 83.6% of the population, while the Mongols comprised 14.8% of the population. By 2020, the percentage of Han Chinese had dropped to 78.7%. While the Hetao region along the Yellow River has always alternated between farmers from the south and nomads from the north, the most recent wave of Han Chinese migration began in the early 18th century with encouragement from the Qing dynasty, and continued into the 20th century. Han Chinese live mostly in the Hetao region as well as various population centres in central and eastern Inner Mongolia. Over 70% of Mongols are concentrated in less than 18% of Inner Mongolia's territory (Hinggan League, and the prefectures of Tongliao and Chifeng).

Mongols are the second largest ethnic group, comprising 17.7% of the population as of the 2020 census. They include many diverse Mongolian-speaking groups; groups such as the Buryats and the Oirats are also officially considered to be Mongols in China. In addition to the Manchus, other Tungusic ethnic groups, the Oroqen, and the Evenks also populate parts of northeastern Inner Mongolia. There is also a significant number of Hui and Koreans.

Many of the traditionally nomadic Mongols have settled in permanent homes as their pastoral economy was collectivised during the Mao era, and some have taken jobs in cities as migrant labourers; however, some Mongols continue in their nomadic tradition. In practice, highly educated Mongols tend to migrate to big urban centres after which they become essentially indistinct with ethnic Han Chinese populations.

Inter-marriage between Mongol and non-Mongol populations is very common, particularly in areas where Mongols are in regular contact with other groups. There was little cultural stigma within Mongol families for marrying outside the ethnic group, and in urban centres in particular, Mongol men and women married non-Mongols at relatively similar rates. The rates of intermarriage stands in very sharp contrast to ethnic Tibetans and Uyghurs in their respective autonomous regions. By the 1980s, for instance, in the former Jirim League, nearly 40% of marriages with at least one Mongol spouse was a mixed Mongol–Han Chinese marriage. However, anecdotal reports have also demonstrated an increase in Mongol-female, Han Chinese-male pairings in which the woman is of a rural background, ostensibly shutting rural Mongol males from the marriage market as the sex ratio in China becomes more skewed with a much higher proportion of men.

Ethnic groups in Inner Mongolia, 2010 census
Ethnicity	Population	Percentage
Han	19,650,687	79.54%
Mongol	4,226,093	17.11%
Manchu	452,765	1.83%
Daur	121,483	0.49%
Evenks	26,139	0.11%
Oroqen people	8,464	0.07%

Year	Population	Han Chinese		Mongol		Manchu	
1953	6,100,104	5,119,928	83.9%	888,235	14.6%	18,354	0.3%
1964	12,348,638	10,743,456	87.0%	1,384,535	11.2%	50,960	0.4%
1982	19,274,281	16,277,616	84.4%	2,489,378	12.9%	237,149	1.2%
1990	21,456,500	17,290,000	80.6%	3,379,700	15.8%		
2000	23,323,347	18,465,586	79.2%	3,995,349	17.1%	499,911	2.3%
2010	24,706,321	19,650,687	79.5%	4,226,093	17.1%	452,765	1.83%
2020	24,049,155	18,935,537	78.7%	4,247,815	17.7%		

Territories with Mongol majorities and near-majorities
Name of banner	Mongol population	Percentage
Horqin Right Middle Banner, Hinggan (2020)	221,258	86.6%
New Barag Right Banner, Hulunbuir (2009)	28,369	82.2%
Horqin Left Back Banner, Tongliao	284,000	75%
New Barag Left Banner, Hulunbuir (2009)	31,531	74.9%
Horqin Left Middle Banner, Tongliao	395,000	73.5%
East Ujimqin Banner, Xilingol (2009)	43,394	72.5%
West Ujimqin Banner, Xilingol	57,000	65%
Sonid Left Banner, Xilingol (2006)	20,987	62.6%
Bordered Yellow Banner, Xilingol	19,000	62%
Hure Banner, Tongliao	93,000	56%
Jarud Banner, Tongliao	144,000	48%
Horqin Right Front Banner, Hinggan	162,000	45%
Old Barag Banner, Hulunbuir (2006)	25,903	43.6%
Jalaid Banner, Hinggan	158,000	39%
Ar Khorchin Banner, Chifeng (2002)	108,000	36.6%

== Language and culture ==
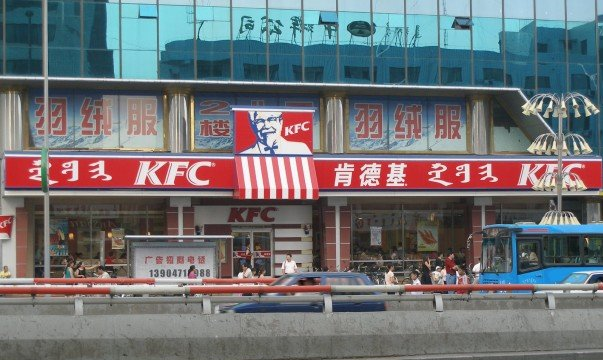
A KFC in Hohhot, the capital, with a bilingual street sign in Chinese and Mongolian

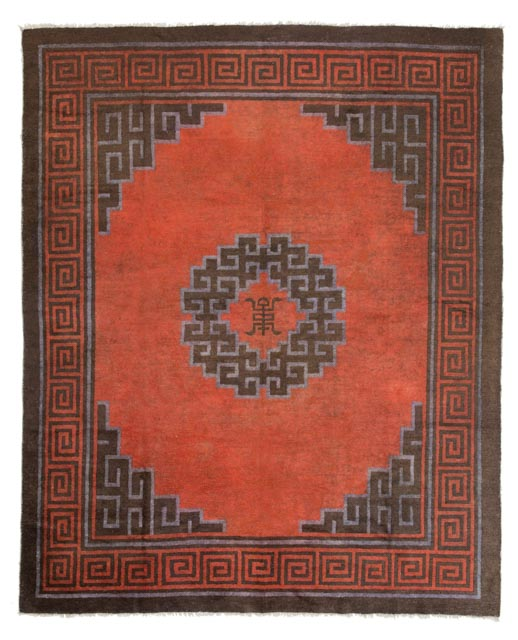
Inner Mongolian carpet c. 1870

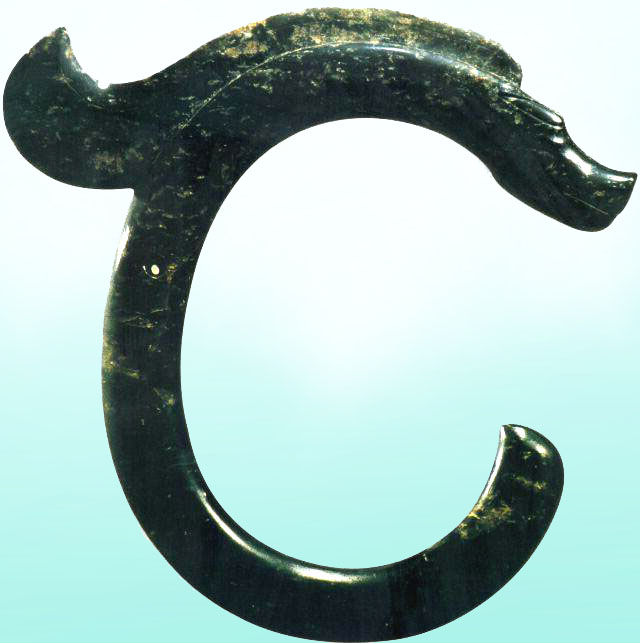
Jade dragon of the Hongshan culture (4700 BC – 2900 BC) found in Ongniud Banner, Chifeng

The use of Mongolian by Inner Mongolia's 4.1 million ethnic Mongols has sharply declined since the 1980s. Across the whole of China, the language is spoken by roughly half of the country's 5.8 million ethnic Mongols (2005 estimate). with 2.1 million Mongol speakers in Inner Mongolia. The use of Mongolian in China, specifically in Inner Mongolia, has witnessed periods of decline and revival over the last few hundred years. The language experienced a decline during the late Qing period, a revival between 1947 and 1965, a second decline between 1966 and 1976, a second revival between 1977 and 1992, and a third decline between 1995 and 2012. However, in spite of the decline of the Mongolian language in some of Inner Mongolia's urban areas and educational spheres, the ethnic identity of the urbanised Chinese-speaking Mongols is most likely going to survive due to the presence of urban ethnic communities. The multilingual situation in Inner Mongolia does not appear to obstruct efforts by ethnic Mongols to preserve their language. Although an unknown number of Mongols in China, such as the Tumets, may have completely or partially lost the ability to speak their language, they are still registered as ethnic Mongols and continue to identify themselves as ethnic Mongols. The children of inter-ethnic Mongol-Chinese marriages also claim to be and are registered as ethnic Mongols.

By law, all street signs, commercial outlets, and government documents must be bilingual, written in both Mongolian and Chinese. There are three Mongolian TV channels in the Inner Mongolia Satellite TV network. In public transportation, all announcements are to be bilingual.

Mongols in Inner Mongolia speak Mongolian dialects such as Chakhar, Xilingol, Baarin, Khorchin and Kharchin Mongolian and, depending on definition and analysis, further dialects or closely related independent Central Mongolic languages such as Ordos, Khamnigan, Barghu Buryat and the arguably Oirat dialect Alasha. The standard pronunciation of Mongolian in China is based on the Chakhar dialect of the Plain Blue Banner, located in central Inner Mongolia, while the grammar is based on all Inner Mongolian dialects. This is different from the Mongolian state, where the standard pronunciation is based on the closely related Khalkha dialect. There are a number of independent languages spoken in Hulunbuir such as the somewhat more distant Mongolic language Dagur and the Tungusic language Evenki. Officially, even the Evenki dialect Oroqin is considered a language.

The Han Chinese of Inner Mongolia speak a variety of dialects, depending on the region. Those in the eastern parts tend to speak Northeastern Mandarin, which belongs to the Mandarin group of dialects; those in the central parts, such as the Yellow River valley, speak varieties of Jin, another subdivision of Chinese, due to its proximity to other Jin-speaking areas in China such as the Shanxi province. Cities such as Hohhot and Baotou both have their unique brand of Jin Chinese such as the Zhangjiakou–Hohhot dialect which are sometimes incomprehensible with dialects spoken in northeastern regions such as Hailar.

The vast grasslands have long symbolised Inner Mongolia. Mongolian art often depicts the grassland in an uplifting fashion and emphasises Mongolian nomadic traditions. The Mongols of Inner Mongolia still practice their traditional arts. Inner Mongolian cuisine has Mongol roots and consists of dairy-related products and hand-held lamb (手扒肉). In recent years, franchises based on hot pot have appeared in Inner Mongolia, the best known of which is Little Sheep. Notable Inner Mongolian commercial brand names include Mengniu and Yili, both of which began as dairy product and ice cream producers.

Among the Han Chinese of Inner Mongolia, Shanxi opera is a popular traditional form of entertainment. See also: Shanxi. A popular career in Inner Mongolia is circus acrobatics. The internationally known Inner Mongolia Acrobatic Troupe travels and performs with the renowned Ringling Bros. and Barnum & Bailey Circus.

== Religion ==
Religion in Inner Mongolia (2005–2010)
Chinese, Han Buddhism and Mongolian folk religion (worship of Heaven and ovoo/aobao)	80%
Tibetan Buddhism	12.0%
Chinese ancestral religion	2.35%
Christianity	2.0%
Islam	1.0%

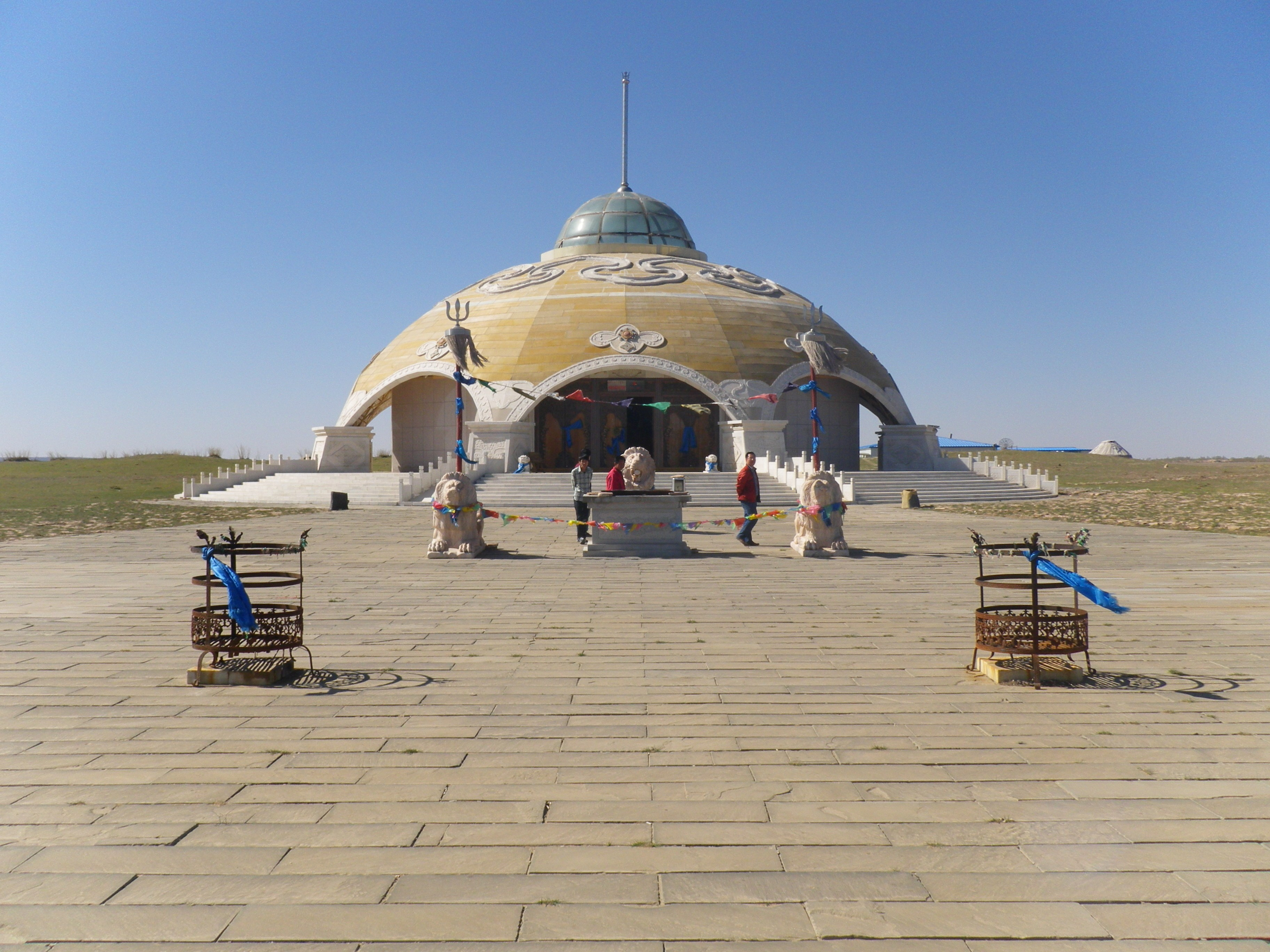
Temple of the White Sulde of Genghis Khan in the town of Uxin in Inner Mongolia, in the Mu Us Desert. The worship of Genghis is shared by Chinese and Mongolian folk religion. (Note: The White Sulde (White Spirit) is one of the two spirits of Genghis Khan (the other being the Black Sulde), represented either as his white or yellow horse or as a fierce warrior riding this horse. In its interior, the temple enshrines a statue of Genghis Khan (at the centre) and four of his men on each side (the total making nine, a symbolic number in Mongolian culture), there is an altar where offerings to the godly men are made, and three white suldes made with white horse hair. From the central sulde there are strings which hold tied light blue pieces of cloth with a few white ones. The wall is covered with all the names of the Mongol kins. The Chinese worship Genghis as the ancestral god of the Yuan dynasty.)

According to a survey held in 2004 by the Minzu University of China, about 80% of the population of the region practice the worship of Heaven (that is named Tian in the Chinese tradition and Tenger in the Mongolian tradition) and of ovoo/aobao.

Official statistics report that 10.9% of the population (3 million people) are members of Tibetan Buddhist groups. According to the Chinese Spiritual Life Survey of 2007 and the Chinese General Social Survey of 2009, Christianity is the religious identity of 3.2% of the population of the region and Chinese ancestral religion that of 2.36%, while a demographic analysis of the year 2010 reported that Muslims make up 0.91%.

The cult of Genghis Khan, present in the form of various Genghis Khan temples, is a tradition of Mongolian shamanism, in which he is considered a cultural hero and divine ancestor, an embodiment of the Tenger (Heaven, God of Heaven). His worship in special temples, greatly developed in Inner Mongolia since the 1980s, is also shared by the Han Chinese, claiming his spirit as the founding principle of the Yuan dynasty.

Tibetan Buddhism (Mongolian Buddhism, locally also known as "Yellow Buddhism") is the dominant form of Buddhism in Inner Mongolia, also practised by many Han Chinese. Another form of Buddhism, practised by the Chinese, are the schools of Chinese Buddhism.

== Tourism ==
In the capital city Hohhot:

- Da Zhao Temple is a Buddhist temple built in 1580. Dazhao Temple is known for three sites: a statue of Buddha made from silver, elaborate carvings of dragons, and murals.
- Five-pagoda Temple is located in the capital of Inner Mongolia Hohhot. It is also called Jingangzuo Dagoba, used to be one building of the Cideng Temple (Temple of Merciful Light) built in 1727.
- Residence of Gurun Princess Kejing is a mansion typical of Qing dynasty architectural style that was built in 1705 by the Kangxi Emperor for his daughter.
- Wanbu-Huayanjing Pagoda (万部华严经塔) in Hohhot. It was built during the reign of Emperor Shengzong (983–1031) of the Khitan Liao dynasty (907–1125) and is still well preserved.
- Xiaozhao Temple, also known as Chongfu temple, is a Buddhist temple built in 1697 and favoured by the Kangxi Emperor of the Qing dynasty.
- Xilitu Zhao / Siregtu juu Temple is the largest Buddhist temple in the Höhhot area, and once the centre of power of Tibetan Buddhism in the region.
- Zhaojun Tomb is the tomb of Wang Zhaojun, a Han dynasty palace lady-in-waiting who became the consort of the Xiongnu ruler Huhanye Shanyu in 33BC.

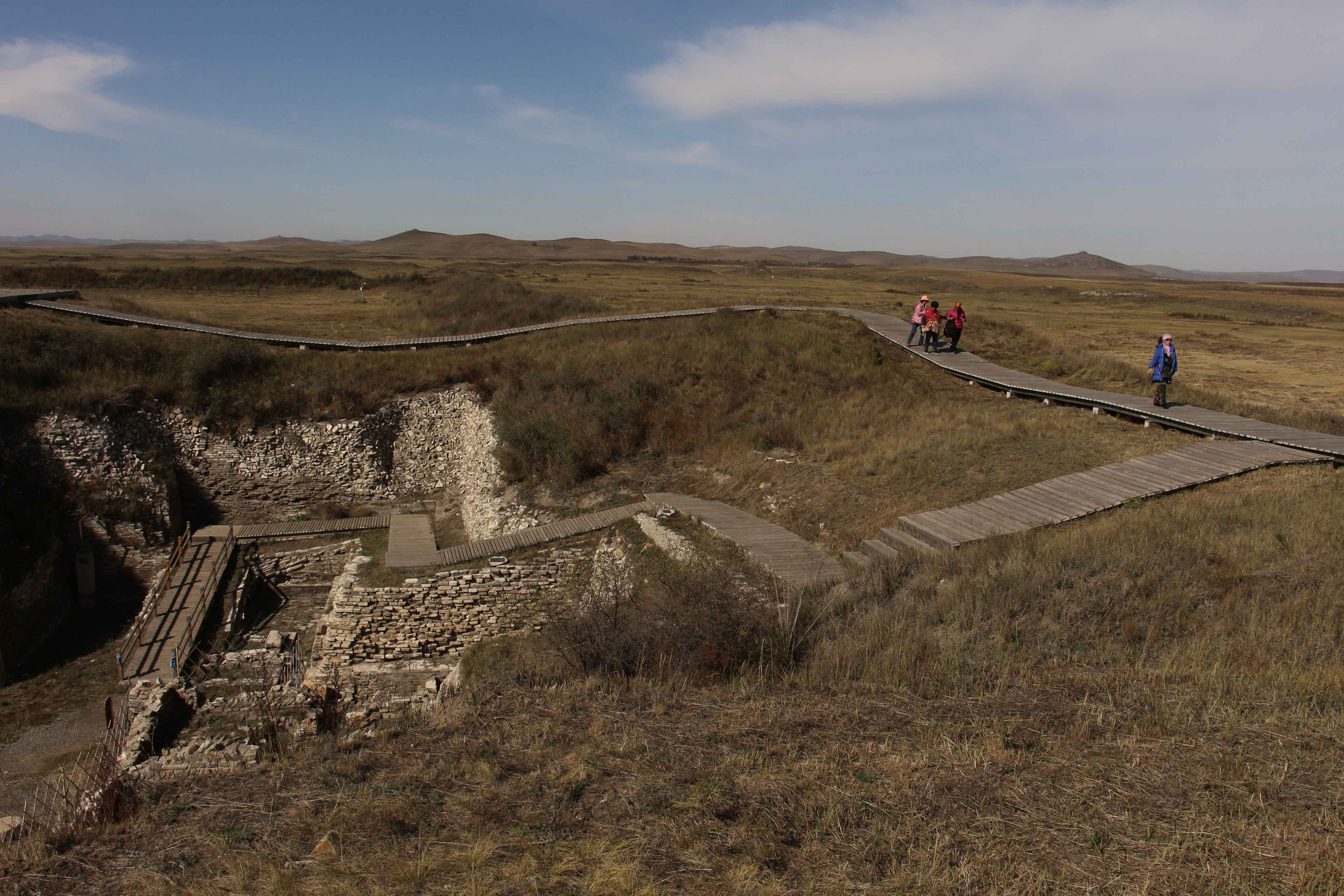
The ruins of Shangdu

Elsewhere in Inner Mongolia:

- Baotou's urban grassland, Saihantala, with elevations ranging from 1,034 to 1,058 meters, features yurts, god hills, wrestling, and horse racing activities.
- The Mausoleum of Genghis Khan, the cenotaph of Genghis Khan, is located in Ordos City.
- Bashang Grasslands, on the border close to Beijing, is a popular retreat for urban residents wanting to get a taste of grasslands life.
- The Arshihaty Stone Forest in Hexigten Global Geopark has magnificent granite rock formations formed from natural erosion.
- Xiangshawan, or "singing sands gorge", is located in the Gobi Desert and contains numerous tourist attractions including sand sledding and camel rides.
- Remains of Zhongjing (Central Capital) built in 1003 by Emperor Shengzong of the Khitan Liao dynasty (907–1125) in Ningcheng County.
- Remains of Shangjing (Upper Capital) built in 918 by Yelu Abaoji the 1st emperor of the Khitan Liao dynasty (907–1125). Also called Huangdu, it was one of the five capitals of the Liao dynasty.
- Zuling Mausoleum of Abaoji Khan. It was built in 926 for Abaoji the 1st Emperor of the Liao dynasty. Located north-west of Shifangzi village.
- Tablets of Juyan. Han dynasty (206 BC – 220 AD) inscriptions on wood and bamboo. In 1930 Folke Bergman of the Sino-Swedish expedition first discovered 10,000 tablets at Ejin Khoshuu in the Gobi Desert.
- Ruins of Shangdu (Xanadu) the Summer Capital of the Mongol Yuan dynasty built in 1256 by Kublai Khan.
- White pagoda of the Mongol Yuan dynasty (1279–1368) in Kailu County, Tongliao. It is still well preserved.
- Ruins of Chagan Khoto (查干浩特) capital of the last Mongol Great Khan Ligden (1588–1634). Located in Ar Horqin Banner.

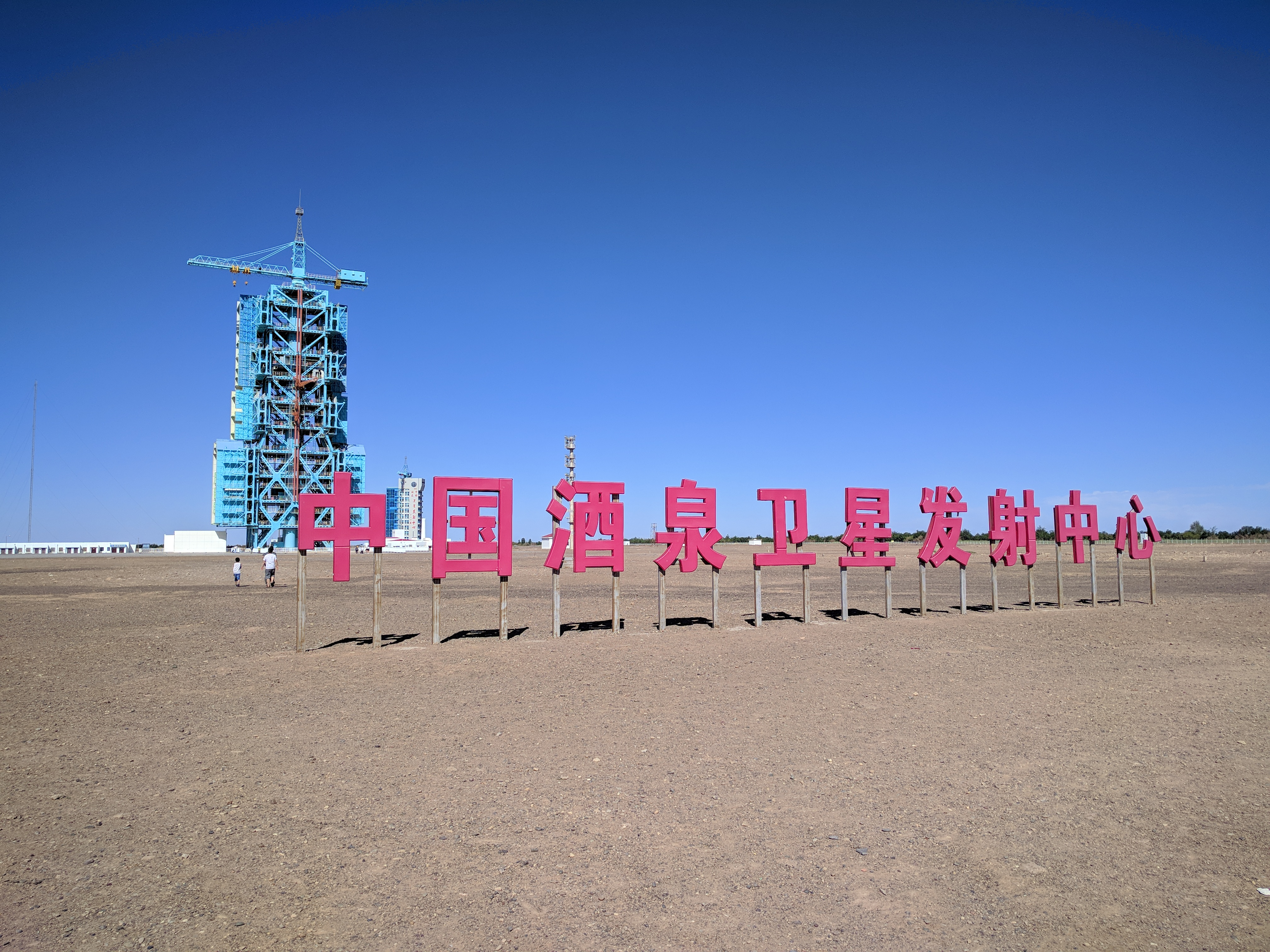
Sign of the Jiuquan Satellite Launch Center

One of China's space vehicle launch facilities, Jiuquan Satellite Launch Center, is located in the Alxa League's Ejin Banner, in the west of Inner Mongolia. It was founded in 1958, making it the PRC's first launch facility. As of 2021, Jiuquan has documented more launches than any other launch facilities in China, and is still the only launch site for crewed space missions (Shenzhou program). While geologically located inside Inner Mongolia, the launch centre is named after Jiuquan, which is the nearest urban centre in the nearby province of Gansu. As military facilities, the core areas at Jiuquan Center are highly restricted and can only be visited by tourist buses operated by the centre, while the visitor centre is open to the public and can be accessed from the south gate.

Inner Mongolia is also home to the two (and only two) space vehicles landing sites in China, the Siziwang Banner Landing Site in Ulanqab and the Dongfeng Landing Site in Alxa.

== Education ==
=== Language policy and protest ===
Inner Mongolia under the People's Republic of China has historically allowed the Mongolian language as a medium of instruction. A 1979 article from the People's Daily praises the re-establishment of Mongolian-language education after "interference and vandalism by the Gang of Four" during the Cultural Revolution.

It was reported by The New York Times on 31 August 2020 that in the summer 2020, the Chinese government announced a new education policy, which called for Chinese to gradually replace Mongolian as the language of instruction in three subjects, including language and literature, politics, and history, in elementary and middle schools around the Inner Mongolia region. Thousands of ethnic Mongolians in northern China gathered to protest the policy.

== Image gallery ==
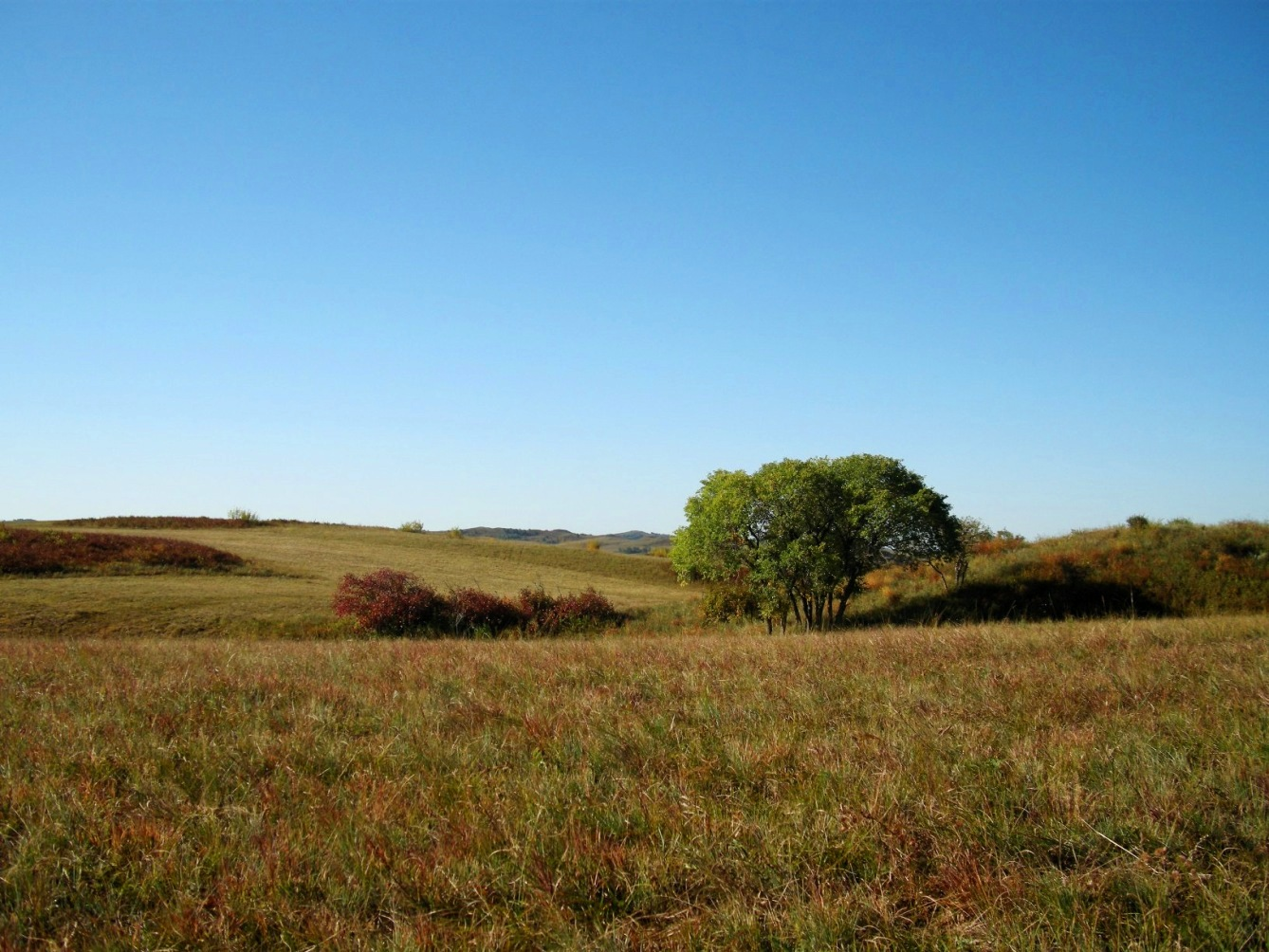
Ulaanbutan grassland

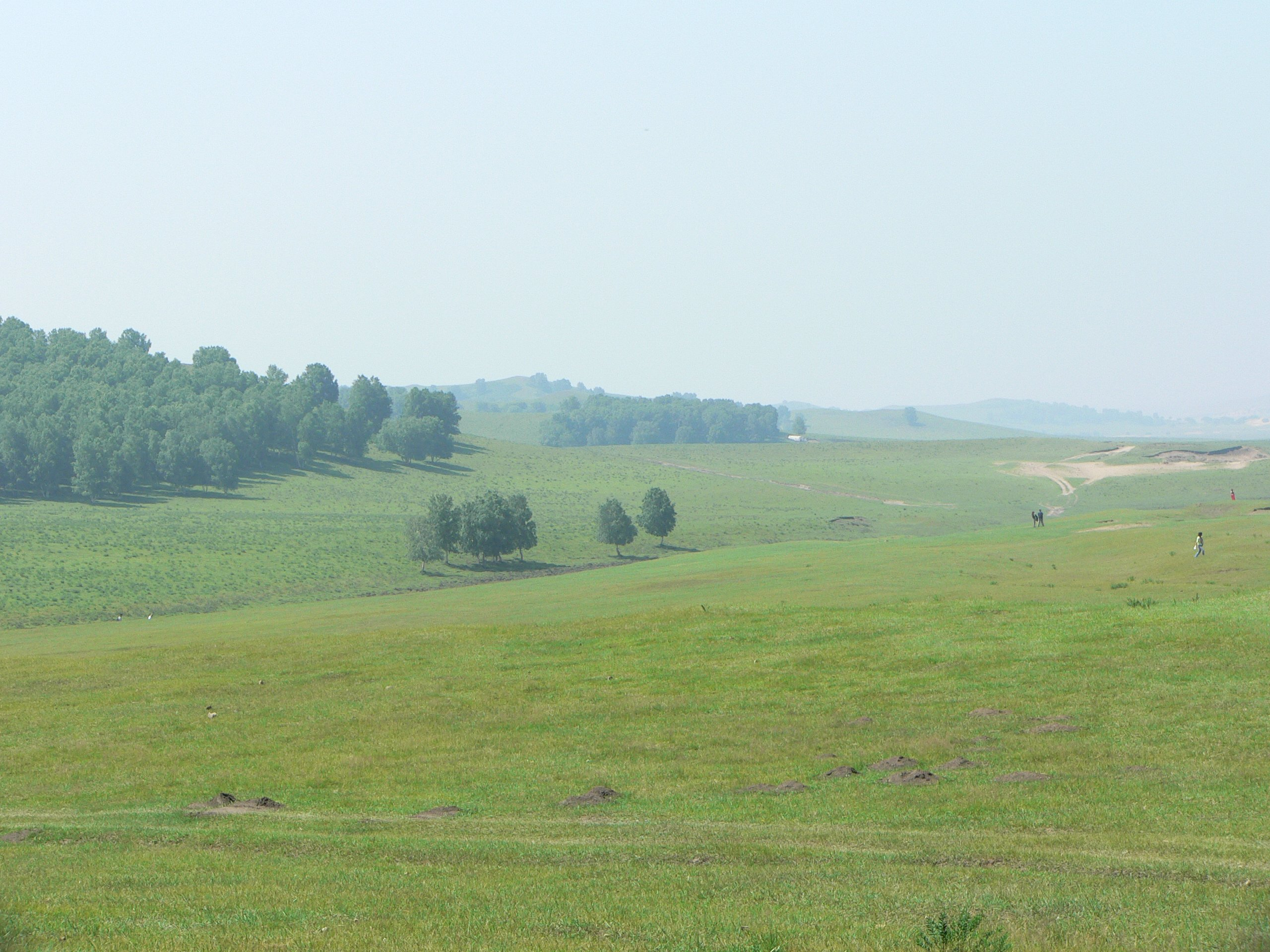
Inner Mongolian grassland

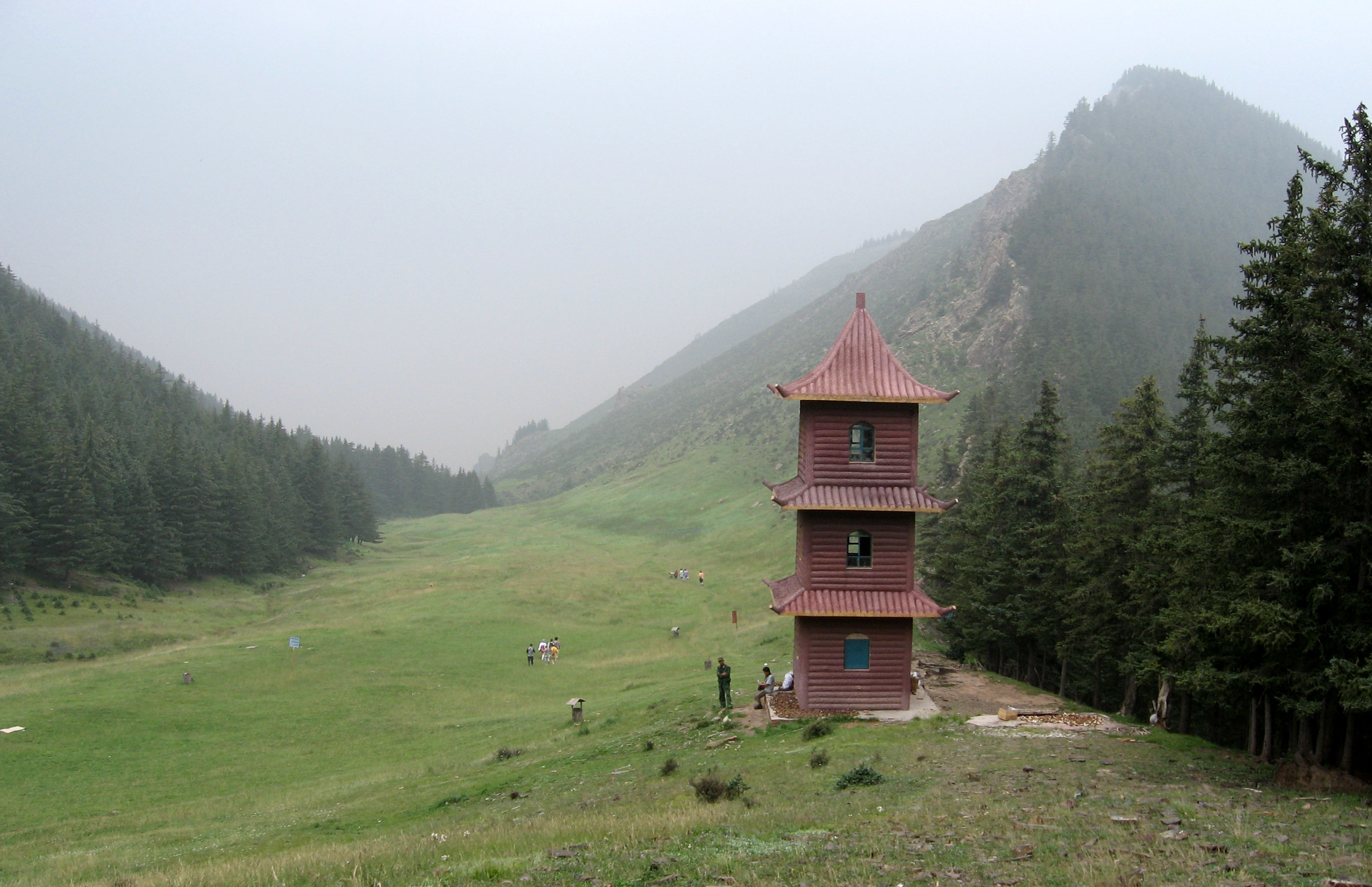
Helan Mountains scenery

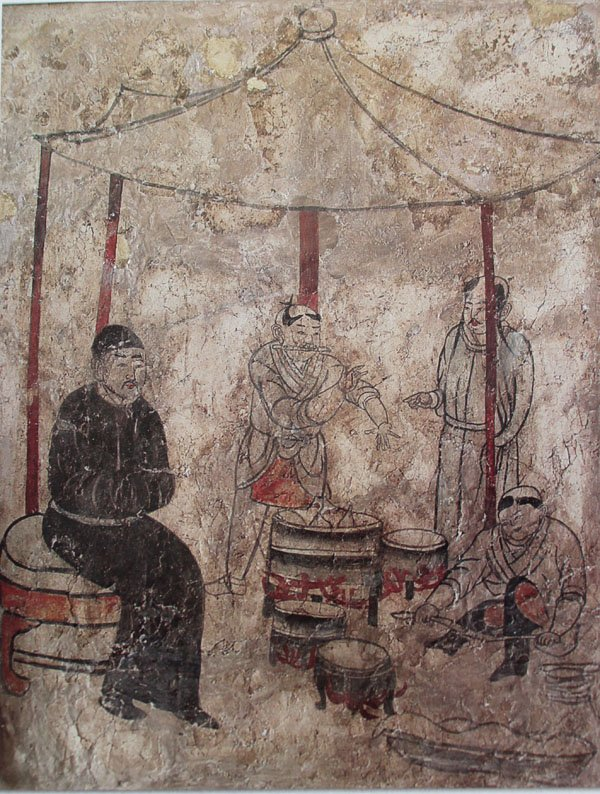
Khitan people cooking. Fresco from the Liao dynasty (907–1125) tomb in Aohan Banner

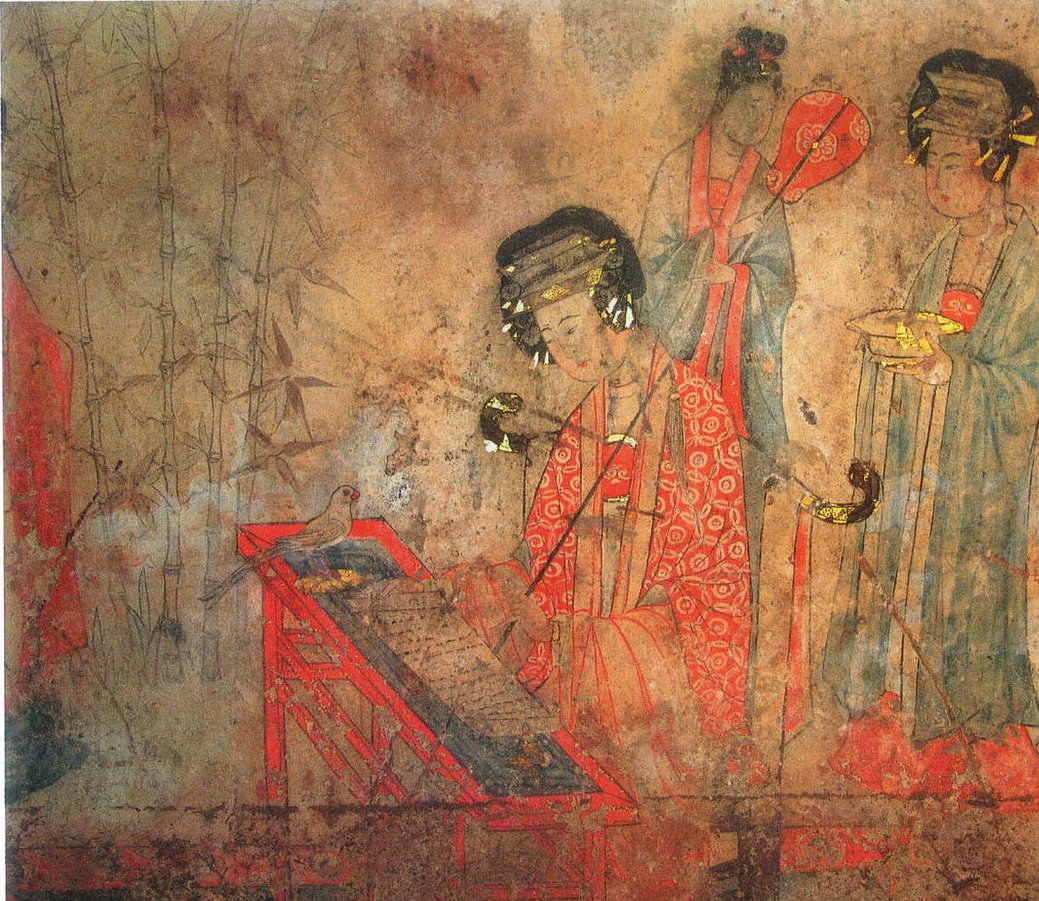
Fresco from the Liao dynasty (907–1125) tomb at Baoshan, Ar Horqin Banner

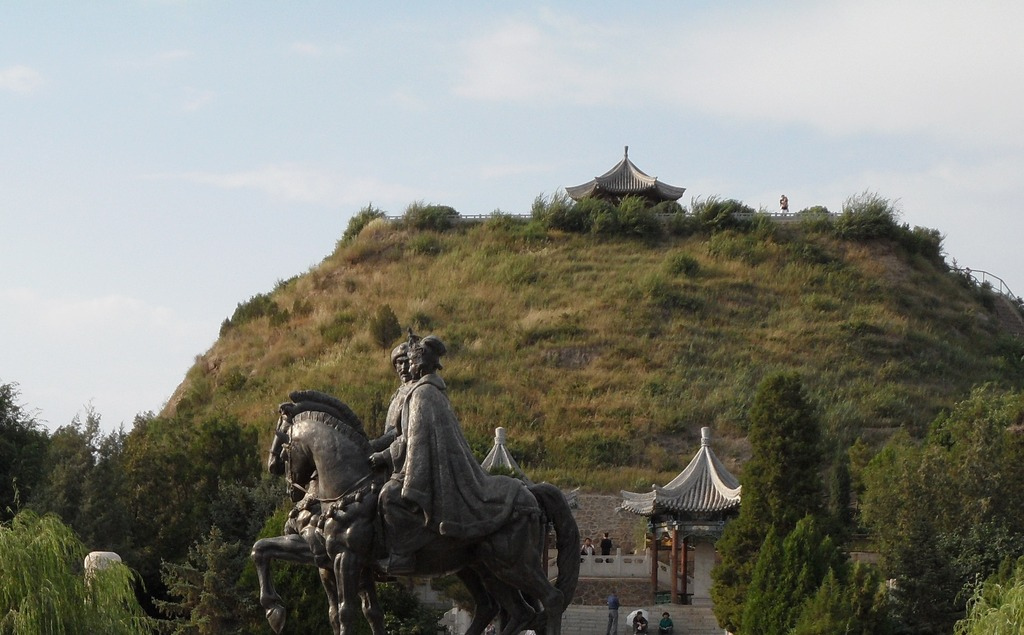
Honorary tomb of Wang Zhaojun (born c. 50BC) in Hohhot

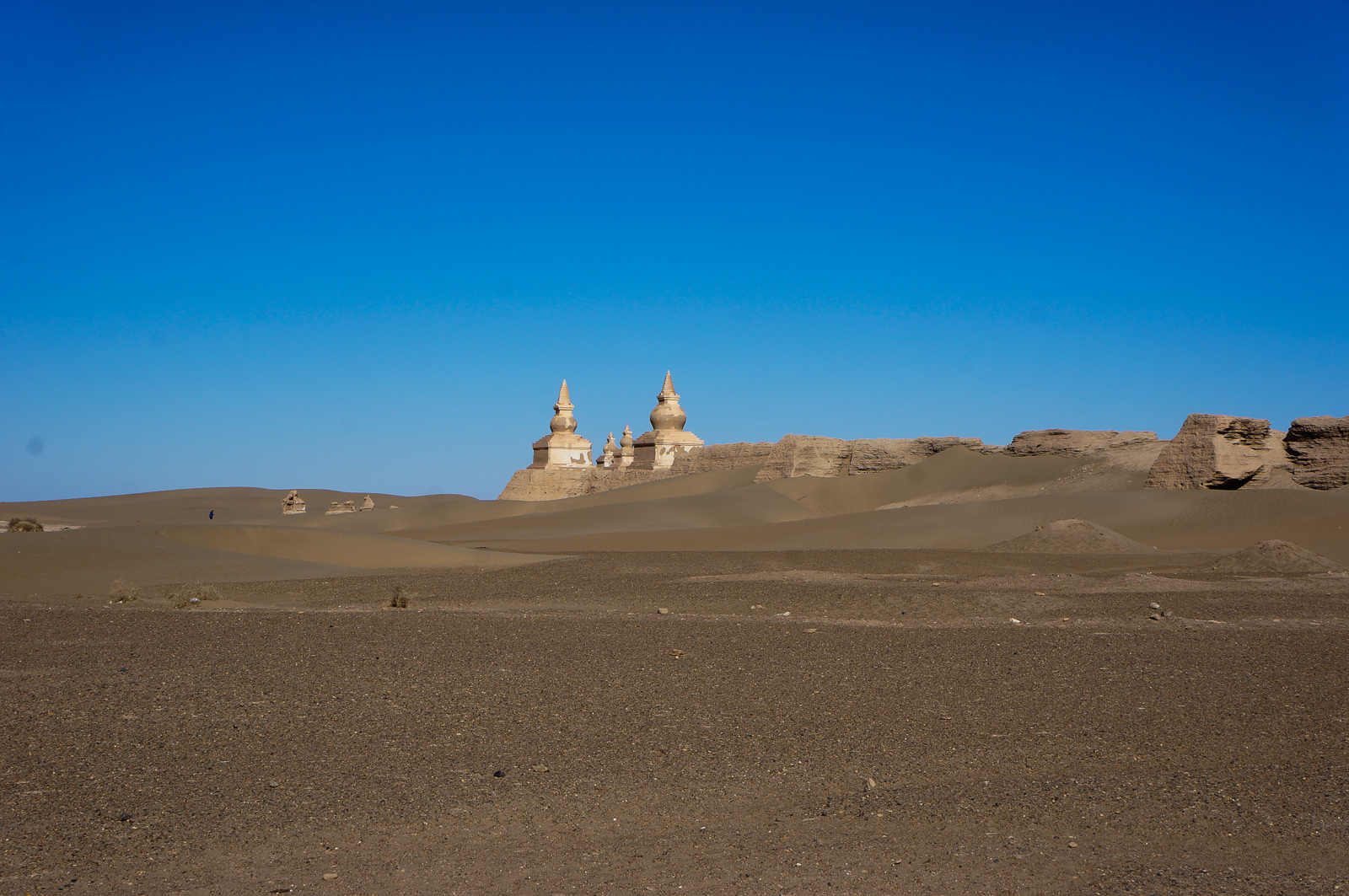
Remains of the city Khara-Khoto built in 1032. Located in Ejin Banner, Alxa League

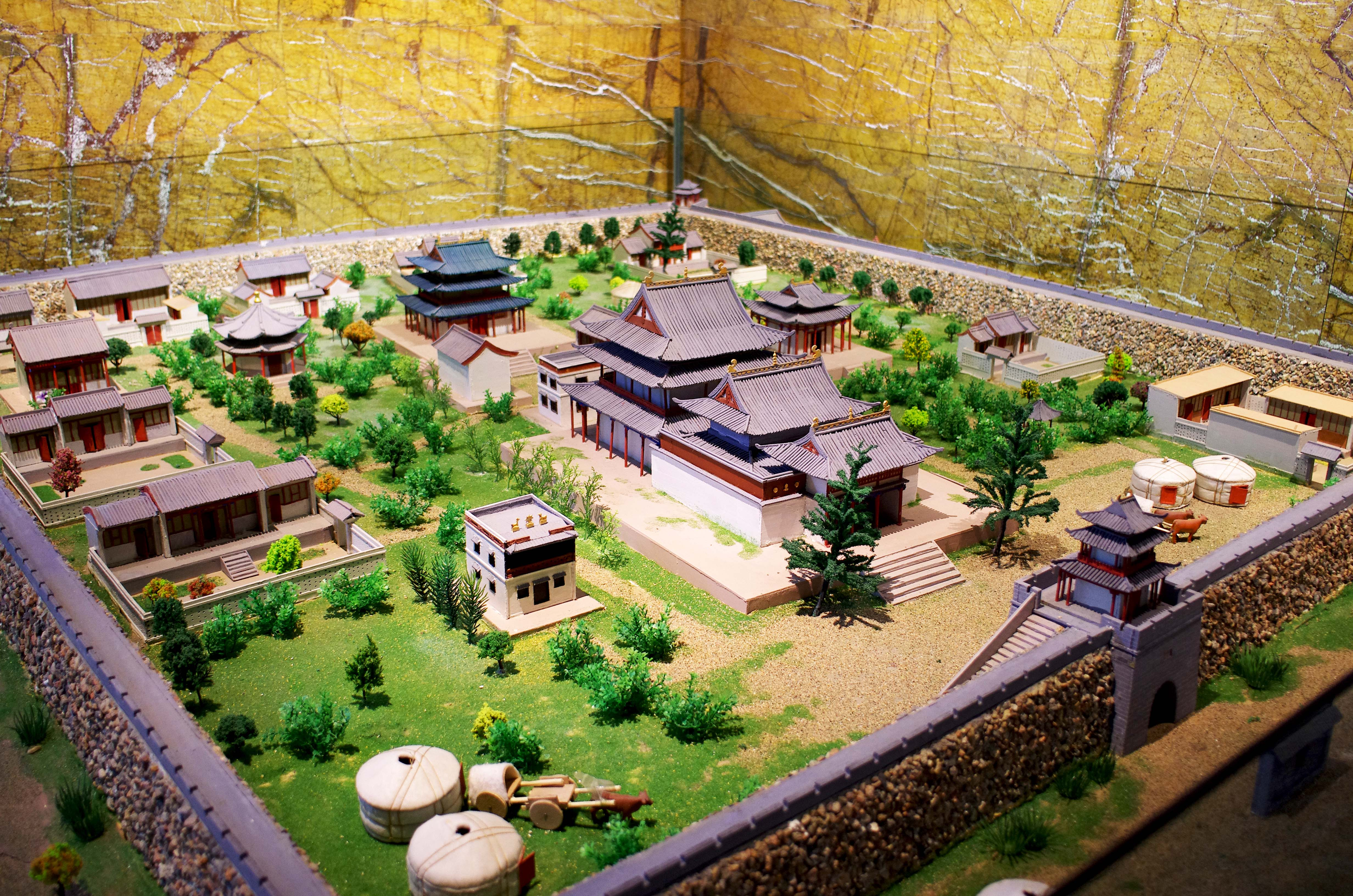
Maidari Juu temple fortress (美岱召; měidài zhào) built by Altan Khan in 1575 near Baotou

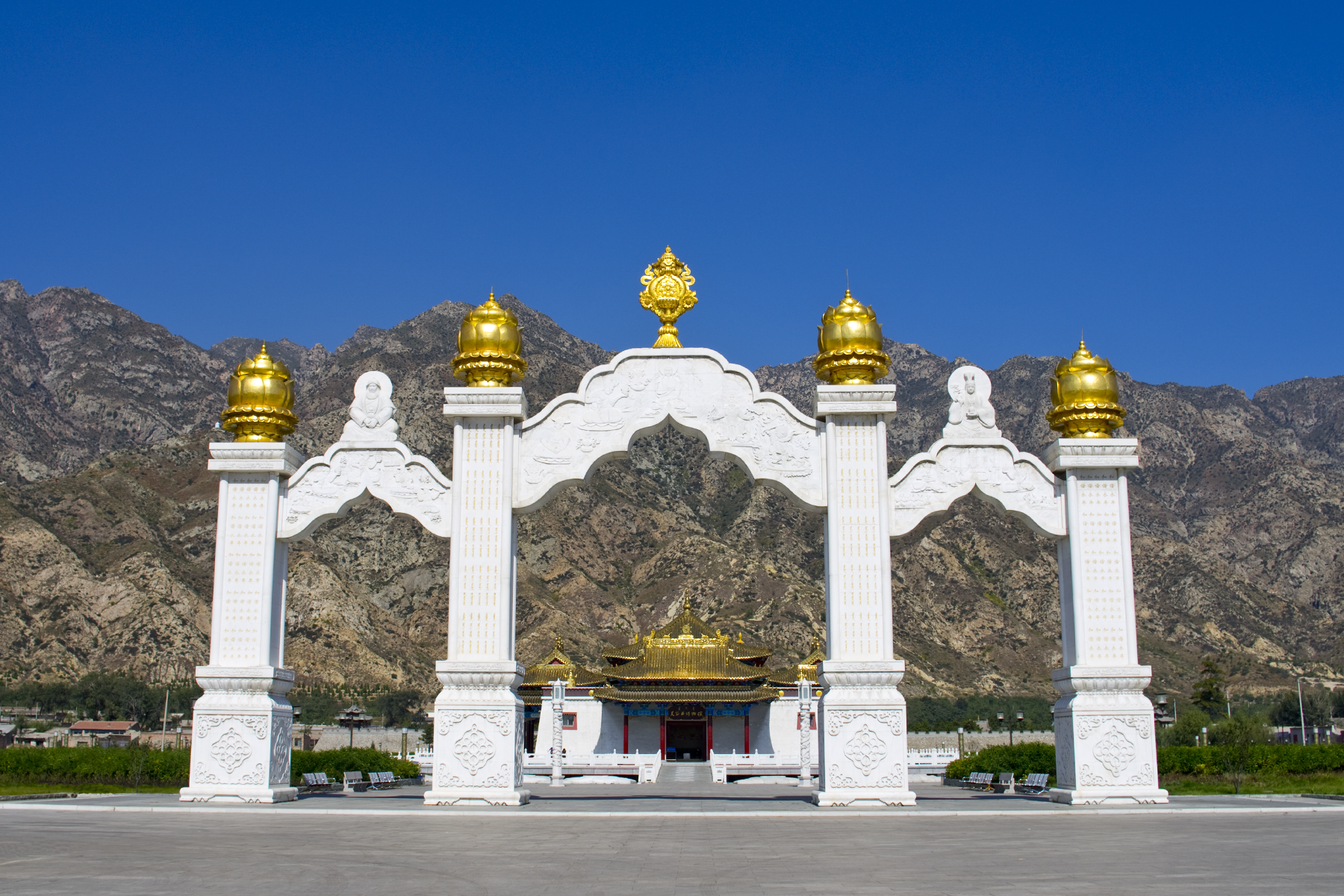
Newly built arch in front of the Maidari Juu temple fortress (1575)

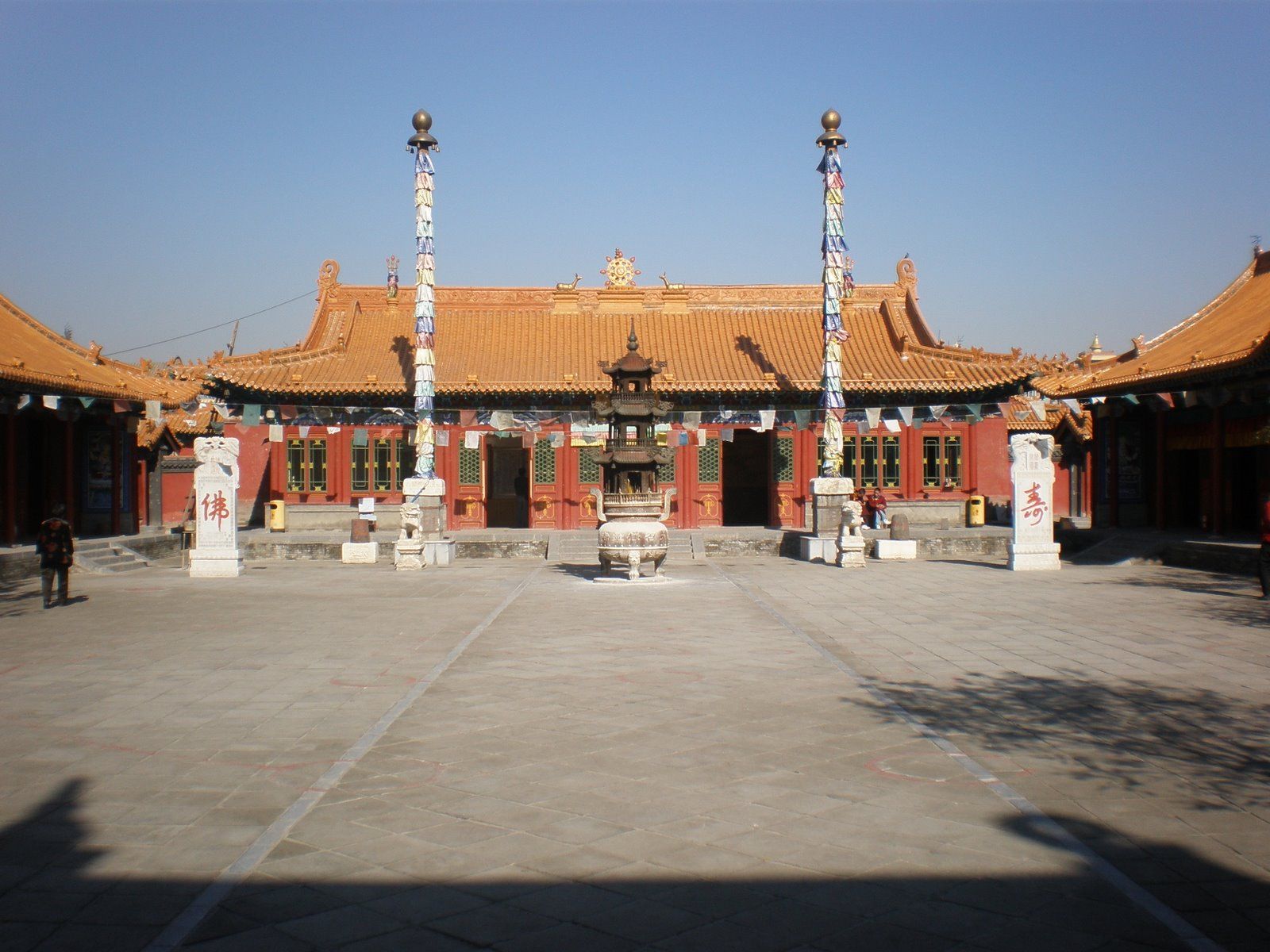
Dazhao temple (also called Ikh Zuu) built by Altan Khan in 1579

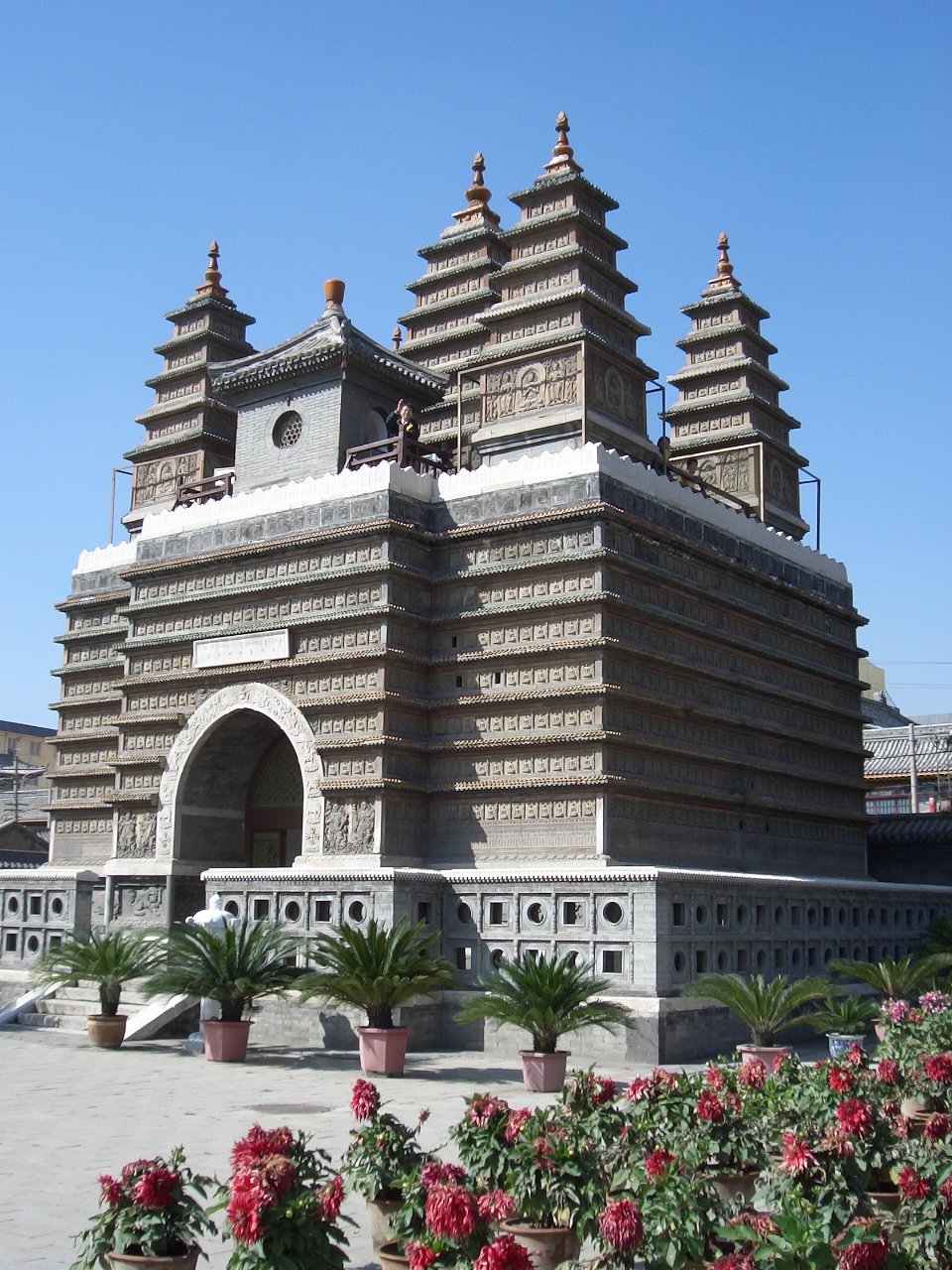
Five Pagoda temple (1727) in Hohhot

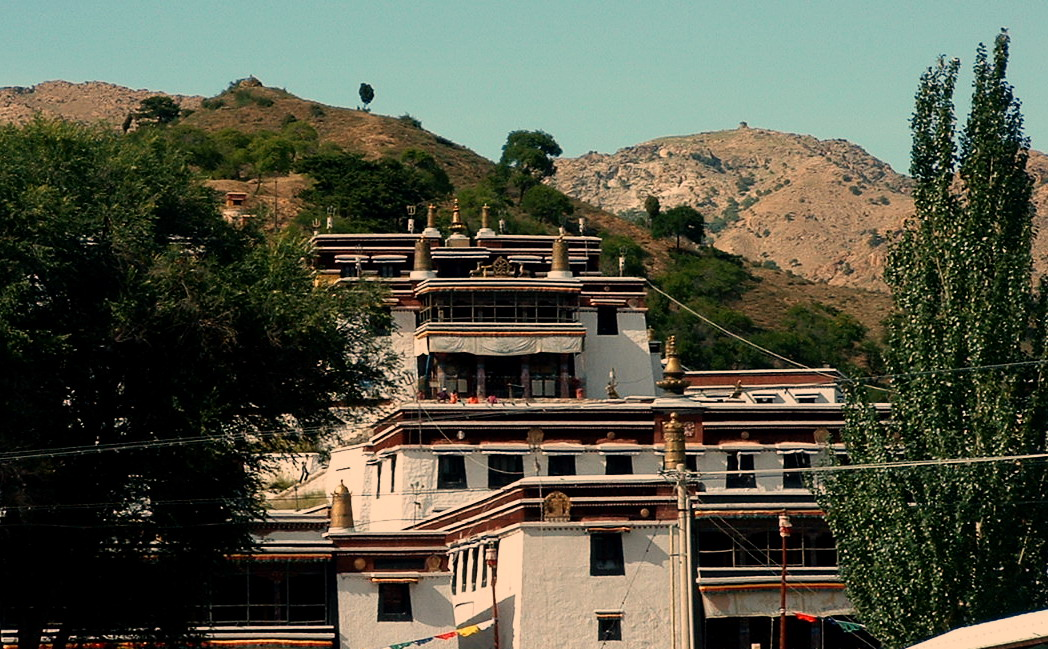
Badekar Monastery (1749) near Baotou, Inner Mongolia. Called Badgar Zuu in Mongolian

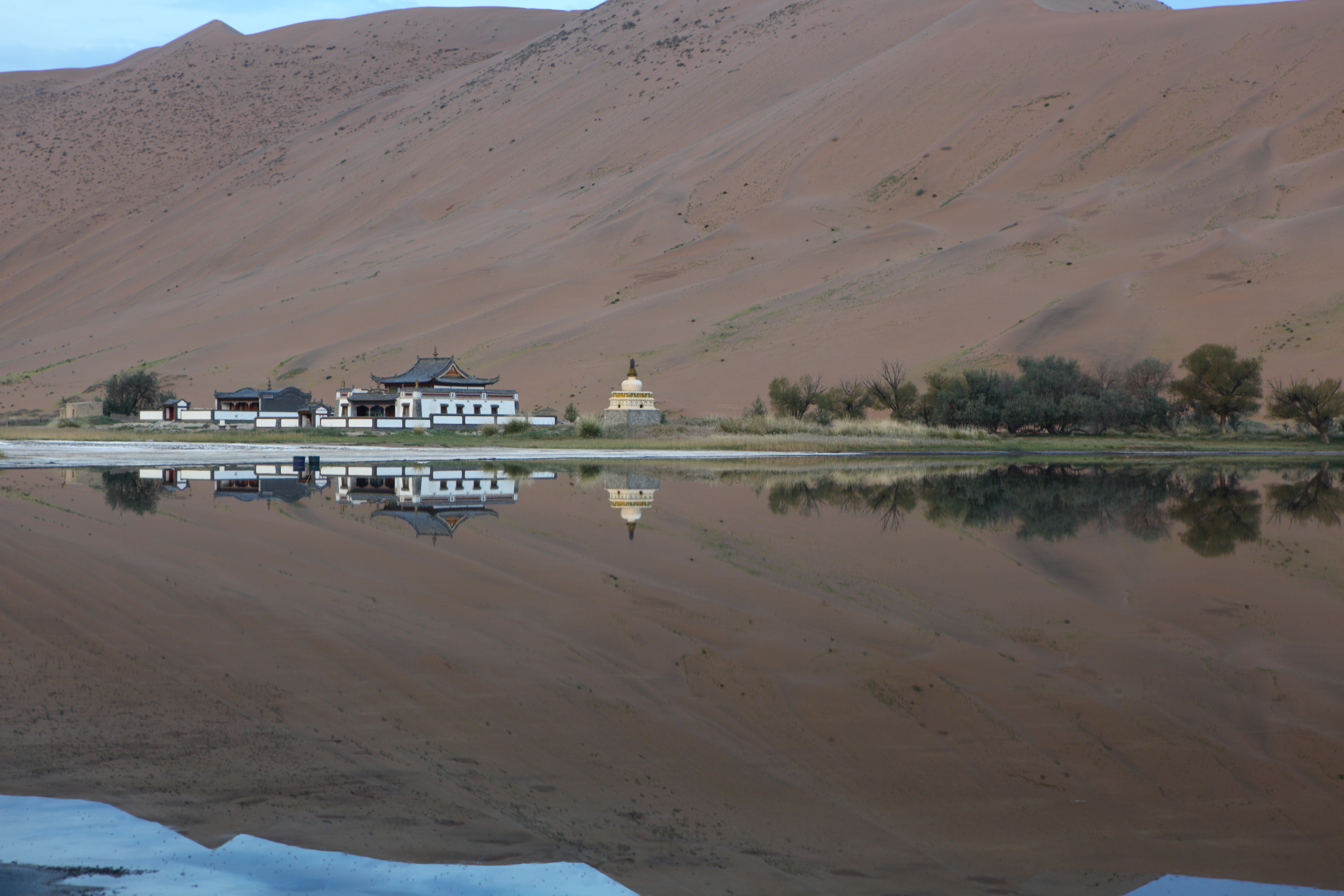
Badain Jaran temple (1868) in Alxa Right Banner, western Inner Mongolia

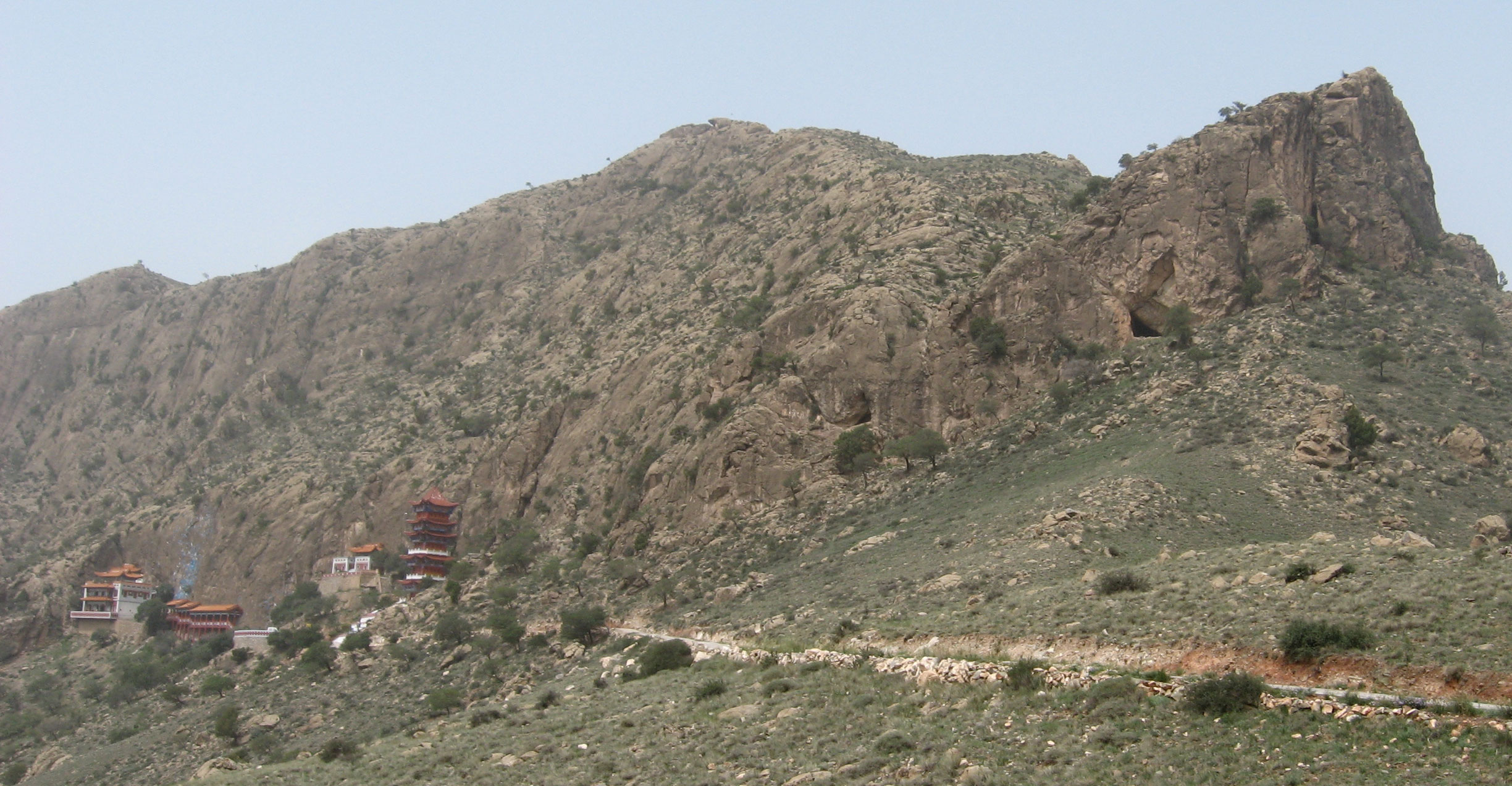
Alxa Western Monastery (Alshaa Baruun Hiid) built in 1756

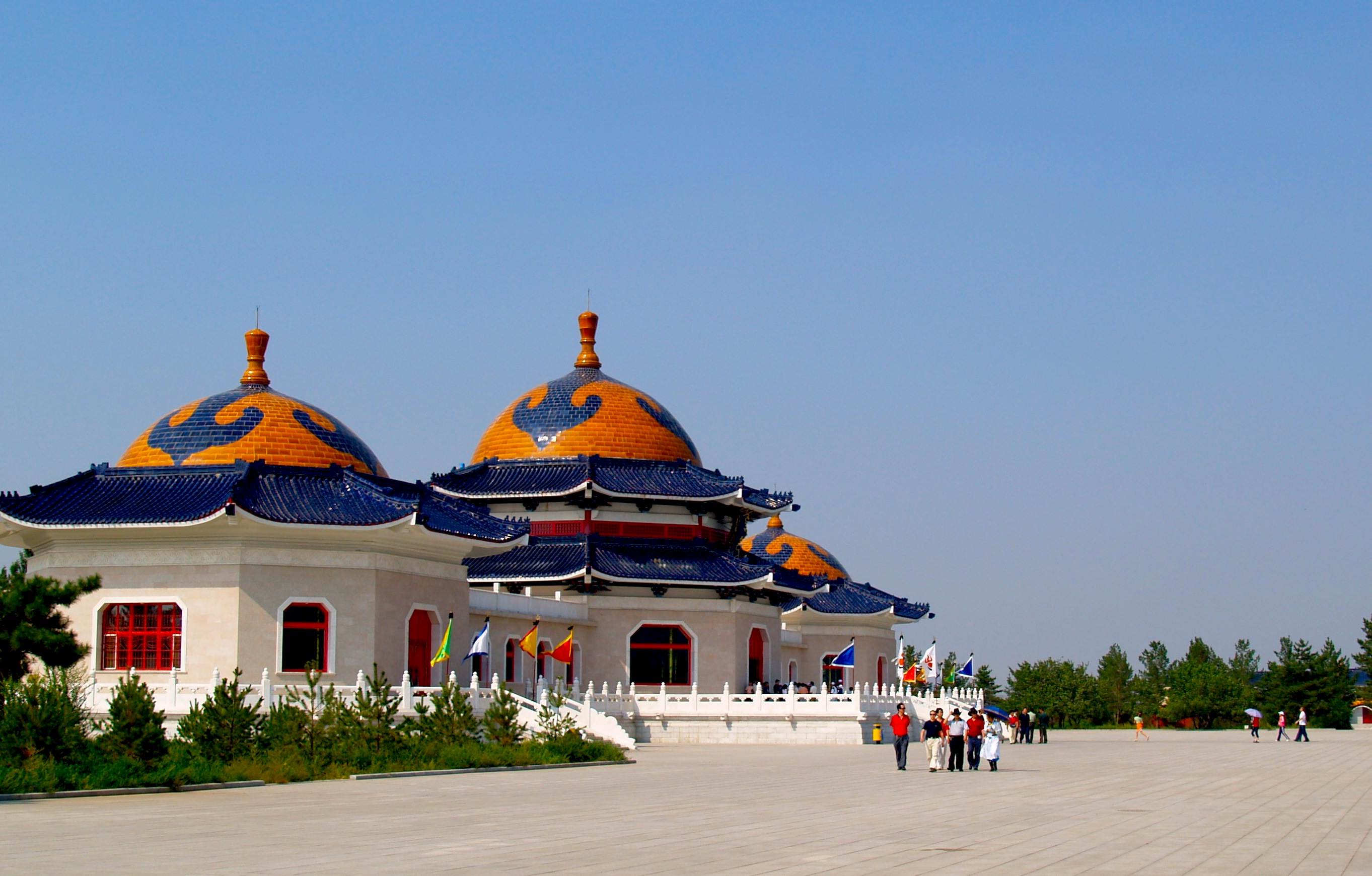
Genghis Khan Mausoleum (1954) in Ejin Horo Banner

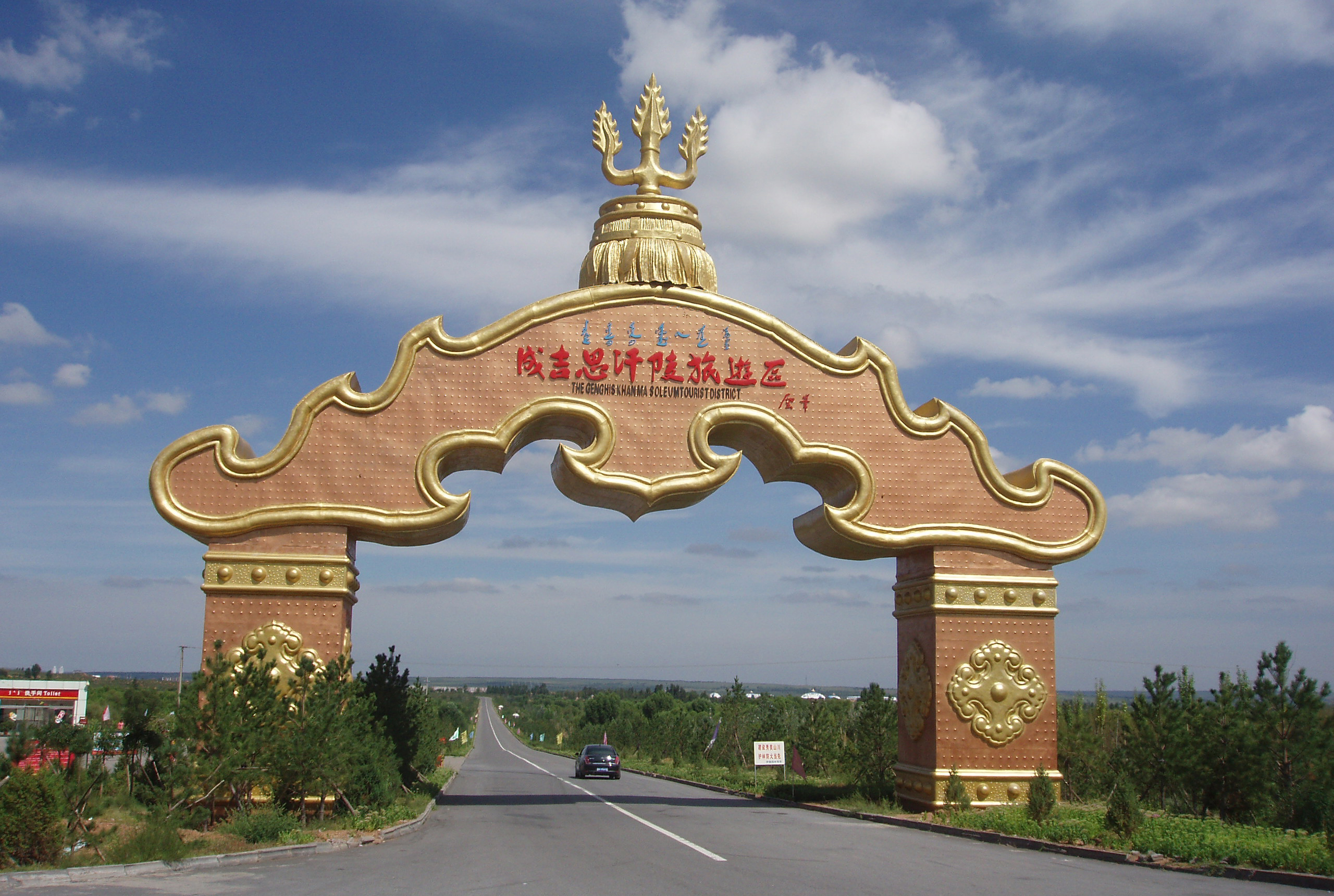
Genghis Khan Mausoleum (1954)

== See also ==
- Leagues of Inner Mongolia
- List of administrative divisions of Inner Mongolia
- Major national historical and cultural sites in Inner Mongolia
- Winter storms of 2009–10 in East Asia
- Haolai River
