= 2011 Inner Mongolia unrest =

2011 civil unrest in Inner Mongolia, China

Location of Xilingol League (red) in Inner Mongolia (orange), where the majority of protests occurred

On the night of May 10, 2011 an ethnic Mongol herdsman was killed by a coal truck driver near Xilinhot, Inner Mongolia, China. The incident, alongside grievances over mining development in the region and the perceived erosion of traditional lifestyle of indigenous peoples, led to a series of Mongol protests across Inner Mongolia. Some 2000 students participated in protests at the Chinese Communist Party headquarters of the West Ujimqin Banner, followed by demonstrations by secondary school students in the Xilinhot area. Select secondary schools and universities with large ethnic Mongol populations were reportedly under "lockdown". The Inner Mongolia government under Hu Chunhua tightened security in Inner Mongolian cities, including dispatching People's Armed Police troops to central Hohhot.

To address the underlying issues, the government provided compensation to the family of the victim, brought forth tougher environmental regulations, and dismissed the Chinese Communist Party Committee Secretary of West Ujimqin. The truck driver was tried, found guilty of murder, and sentenced to death.

The protests are the first large-scale ethnic Mongol protests in China in some twenty years. Although the protests received praise and support from Inner Mongolia self-determination groups abroad, there was no discernible reaction from the government of neighboring Mongolia.

== Origins ==
=== Mergen's death ===
On May 10 an ethnic Mongol herdsman named Mergen (Chinese: 莫日根; Mongols often use one name) was obstructing a mining company, Liaoning Chencheng Industry and Trade Group, from passing onto his pastureland. He was then hit by an ethnic Han coal truck driver named Li Lindong. After the collision, the herdsman's body was dragged for more than 30 meters. The local Mongol population was angered by the incident, and organized protests at government buildings in West Ujimqin Banner on May 25. On May 24, in an attempt to contain the situation, Xilin Gol League authorities held a press conference, announcing the arrest of the truck driver, and promised to deal with the suspect in an "expedient manner."

== Protests spread ==
On May 25, some 2,000 students from several of the city's secondary schools, along with nomadic herdsmen, organized protests at the League government buildings in Xilinhot. Protests also occurred in the East Ujimqin Banner. At this point the themes of the protest had evolved from the death of an individual to collective grievances over the ecological destruction of Inner Mongolian grasslands and the integrity of the homeland of the ethnic Mongols. On May 26 the protests spread to the Bordered Yellow Banner.

On May 27, local authorities announced martial law in the Plain Blue Banner and the West Ujimqin Banner. Some 300 riot police were dispatched and forty protesters were arrested. In the Plain Blue Banner, schools were under lockdown as students were confined to campus grounds for the weekend. Paramilitary troops guarded the major thoroughfares where Banner government buildings were situated.

Although the protests were initially confined to the Xilingol region, some 150 people protested in the capital, Hohhot. The Inner Mongolia government under the auspices of Hu Chunhua adopted a 'take-no-chances' attitude, and sent in police and paramilitary forces to cordon off the city's main square. Several of the city's secondary schools confined students to campus grounds. At the Inner Mongolia University for Nationalities in Tongliao, in the eastern part of the province, students were forbidden to leave campus grounds. The authorities also moved quickly to disrupt mobile and internet communications in an attempt to contain further unrest.

== Reporting ==
During the unrest, previously unknown pro-independence and annexationist groups like the Southern Mongolian Human Rights Information Center (SMHRIC) became sources for foreign media of unconfirmed allegations of tensions, leading China to criticize overseas groups who it says are "trying to play up this incident for ulterior motives". Initial Western media reports described the protests as "ethnic unrest" and likened them to the 2008 Tibetan unrest and the July 2009 Ürümqi riots, but the director of SMHRIC said that the protests were focused on legal rights for herders, and that they "didn't mention higher autonomy or independence." An editorial in the Communist Party's Global Times criticized SMHRIC as having "little connection to the local situation", and criticized foreign media for reading ethnic politics into the protests, saying that "the protests saw no violence between different ethnic groups".

Several of the ethnic Mongolian protestors said their protests were not connected to the Tiananmen Square protests of 1989 (the protests overlapped with the anniversary of Tiananmen), and did not care about it, the Southern Mongolian Human Rights Information Center (SMHRIC) reported that a Mongolian "Hohhot University researcher" said "The June 4 incident has nothing to do with our Mongolian protests, We Mongolians are trying to free ourselves from any form of Chinese control, authoritarian or democratic alike, Our struggle is against a foreign occupation."

After the incident, China have accused unspecified "foreign forces" of exploiting the protests. Li Datong, former editor of Freezing Point, was interviewed by Chinese version of BBC on May 30 on the issue. As early as the 1990s he has been in Xilinhot and warned of the misuse of the Mongol grasslands and related ethnic issues. He said that even when small minority groups are allowed to form representatives, often these representatives are not trusted. He further said that in the past, the Republic of China with the Five Races Under One Union allowed different races to live together.

== Aftermath ==
The suspected driver was arrested. The company's chairman, Guo Shuyun, visited the deceased herdsman's family and bowed to relatives and apologised for his company's involvement in the incident. He promised to respect local people and protect the environment. The deputy party secretary for Inner Mongolia also visited the herdsman's family to express his grief, saying that the suspects would be "severely punished according to law", while the Communist Party chief of Xilingol was dismissed. The family was presented with 10,000 yuan, and the government announced changes in mining rules to lessen the industry's impact on residents and the environment. Li, the truck driver, was publicly tried and found guilty of murder in the Intermediate People's Court of the Xilin Gol League; he was sentenced to death on June 8. The passenger sitting beside him was sentenced to life imprisonment, and two other men that helped the truck evade police were given jail terms of three years. All of the four convicted appealed their sentences, but Mergen's brother expressed gratitude for the verdict.

== Other similar events ==
On May 15 in Abag Banner, Inner Mongolia another Han Chinese coal miner named Sun Shuning (孙树宁) drove a forklift and hit Yan Wenlong (闫文龙), a 22-year-old Manchu. Yan led a group of 20 people to dispute noise, dust and pollution. When they began smashing properties, a clash ensued. In the clash Yan died, and 7 people were injured.
