= Plain and Bordered White Banner =

Plain and Bordered White Banner 正镶白旗 • ᠰᠢᠯᠤᠭᠤᠨ ᠬᠥᠪᠡᠭᠡᠲᠦ ᠴᠠᠭᠠᠨ ᠬᠣᠰᠢᠭᠤ Zhengxiangbai, Xulun Hobot Qagan
- Banner
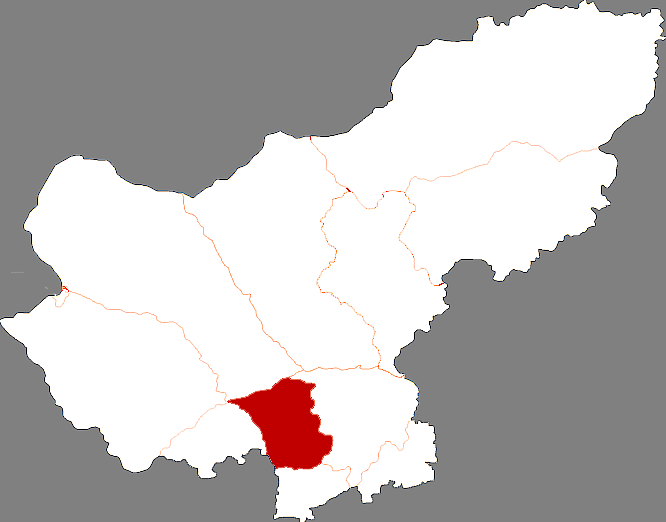
- Location of Plain & Border White Banner within Xilin Gol

- Location in Inner Mongolia Plain & Bordered White (China)
- Coordinates: 42°17′13″N 115°01′48″E
- Country: China
- Autonomous region: Inner Mongolia
- League: Xilin Gol
- Banner seat: Minggant

Area
  - Total: 6,253 km^{2} (2,414 sq mi)

Population (2020)
  - Total: 42,950
  - Density: 6.869/km^{2} (17.79/sq mi)
- Time zone: UTC+8 (China Standard)
- Website: www.zxbq.gov.cn

Plain and Bordered White Banner

Chinese name
- Simplified Chinese: 正镶白旗
- Traditional Chinese: 正鑲白旗
Transcriptions
Standard Mandarin
- Hanyu Pinyin: Zhèngxiāngbái Qí

Mongolian name
- Mongolian Cyrillic: Шулуун Хөвөөт Цагаан хошуу
- Mongolian script: ᠰᠢᠯᠤᠭᠤᠨ ᠬᠥᠪᠡᠭᠡᠲᠦ ᠴᠠᠭᠠᠨ ᠬᠣᠰᠢᠭᠤ
Transcriptions
- SASM/GNC: Siluɣun Köbegetü Čaɣan qosiɣu

Plain and Bordered White Banner (Mongolian: ᠰᠢᠯᠤᠭᠤᠨ ᠬᠥᠪᠡᠭᠡᠲᠦ ᠴᠠᠭᠠᠨ ᠬᠣᠰᠢᠭᠤ; Chinese: 正镶白旗), alternatively Zhengxiangbai Banner in Chinese or Xulun Hobot Qagan Banner in Mongolian, is a banner (administrative division) of Inner Mongolia, China, bordering Hebei province to the south. It is under the administration of Xilin Gol League. The banner received its name from two of the Eight Banners of Chahar.

== Demographics ==
The proportion of nationalities in Plain and Bordered White Banner (2020)
Nationality	Percentage
Han	61.3%
Mongols	37.6%
Manchus	0.8%
Hui People	0.2%
Others	0.1%
Source of the population statistics :

== Administrative divisions ==
Plain and Bordered White Banner is divided into 2 towns and 3 sums.

Name	Simplified Chinese	Hanyu Pinyin	Mongolian (Hudum Script)	Mongolian (Cyrillic)	Administrative division code
Towns
Minggant Town	明安图镇	Míng'āntú Zhèn	ᠮᠢᠩᠭᠠᠨᠲᠤ ᠪᠠᠯᠭᠠᠰᠤ	Мянгант балгас	152529100
Xingyao Town	星耀镇	Xīngyào Zhèn	ᠰᠢᠩ ᠶᠣᠤ ᠪᠠᠯᠭᠠᠰᠤ	Шин ёо балгас	152529101
Sums
Ih Nur Sum	伊和淖尔苏木	Yīhénào'ěr Sūmù	ᠶᠡᠬᠡᠨᠠᠭᠤᠷ ᠰᠤᠮᠤ	Ихнуур сум	152529200
Ulan Qab Sum	乌兰查布苏木	Wūlánchábù Sūmù	ᠤᠯᠠᠭᠠᠨᠴᠠᠪ ᠰᠤᠮᠤ	Улаанцав сум	152529201
Bulgan Tohoi Sum	宝拉根陶海苏木	Bǎolāgēntáohǎi Sūmù	ᠪᠤᠯᠭᠠᠨᠲᠣᠬᠣᠢ ᠰᠤᠮᠤ	Болгондахуй сум	152529202
Others
Elt Breeding Stock Farm	额里图种畜场	Élǐtú Zhǒngchùchǎng	ᠡᠭᠡᠯᠢᠲᠦ ᠮᠠᠯᠵᠢᠯ ᠤᠨ ᠲᠠᠯᠠᠪᠠᠢ	Ээлт малжлын талбай	152529500
Jergent Tree Farm	哲日根图林场	Zhérìgēntú Línchǎng	ᠵᠡᠭᠡᠷᠭᠡᠨᠡᠲᠦ ᠣᠢ ᠰᠢᠭᠤᠷ ᠶᠢᠨ ᠲᠠᠯᠠᠪᠠᠢ	Зээргэнэт ой шуурийн талбай	152529502

== Climate ==
Climate data for Plain and Bordered White Banner, elevation 1,367 m (4,485 ft), (1991–2020 normals, extremes 1981–2010)
Month	Jan	Feb	Mar	Apr	May	Jun	Jul	Aug	Sep	Oct	Nov	Dec	Year
Record high °C (°F)	5.8 (42.4)	12.7 (54.9)	20.2 (68.4)	30.2 (86.4)	32.9 (91.2)	36.0 (96.8)	36.3 (97.3)	34.1 (93.4)	32.2 (90.0)	24.8 (76.6)	16.2 (61.2)	10.7 (51.3)	36.3 (97.3)
Mean daily maximum °C (°F)	−9.9 (14.2)	−4.8 (23.4)	3.4 (38.1)	12.3 (54.1)	19.4 (66.9)	24.2 (75.6)	26.4 (79.5)	24.9 (76.8)	19.5 (67.1)	10.9 (51.6)	0.6 (33.1)	−7.8 (18.0)	9.9 (49.9)
Daily mean °C (°F)	−16.5 (2.3)	−12.3 (9.9)	−3.6 (25.5)	5.3 (41.5)	12.6 (54.7)	17.8 (64.0)	20.3 (68.5)	18.5 (65.3)	12.4 (54.3)	3.8 (38.8)	−6.0 (21.2)	−14.0 (6.8)	3.2 (37.7)
Mean daily minimum °C (°F)	−21.6 (−6.9)	−18.2 (−0.8)	−9.8 (14.4)	−1.7 (28.9)	5.2 (41.4)	10.9 (51.6)	14.1 (57.4)	12.0 (53.6)	5.7 (42.3)	−2.2 (28.0)	−11.4 (11.5)	−19.0 (−2.2)	−3.0 (26.6)
Record low °C (°F)	−36.8 (−34.2)	−35.5 (−31.9)	−28.0 (−18.4)	−13.6 (7.5)	−7.4 (18.7)	−3.4 (25.9)	3.7 (38.7)	2.0 (35.6)	−7.4 (18.7)	−20.6 (−5.1)	−32.6 (−26.7)	−33.3 (−27.9)	−36.8 (−34.2)
Average precipitation mm (inches)	4.3 (0.17)	4.4 (0.17)	7.1 (0.28)	14.8 (0.58)	32.2 (1.27)	53.4 (2.10)	91.7 (3.61)	58.0 (2.28)	41.9 (1.65)	19.1 (0.75)	10.2 (0.40)	5.5 (0.22)	342.6 (13.48)
Average precipitation days (≥ 0.1 mm)	8.1	6.3	5.3	5.5	7.3	10.9	12.6	9.9	9.1	6.1	6.6	8.4	96.1
Average snowy days	12.0	9.6	7.8	4.8	1.4	0	0	0	0.7	4.4	9.3	13.5	63.5
Average relative humidity (%)	71	65	51	41	41	53	63	64	59	57	63	70	58
Mean monthly sunshine hours	222.7	232.6	278.0	282.6	305.3	287.5	284.8	282.8	253.5	247.3	209.9	198.0	3,085
Percentage possible sunshine	75	77	75	70	67	63	62	67	69	73	72	70	70
Source: China Meteorological Administration

== See also ==
- Plain White Banner
- Bordered White Banner
