= Sonid Right Banner =

Sonid Right Banner 苏尼特右旗 • ᠰᠥᠨᠡᠳ ᠪᠠᠷᠠᠭᠤᠨ ᠬᠣᠰᠢᠭᠤ
- Banner
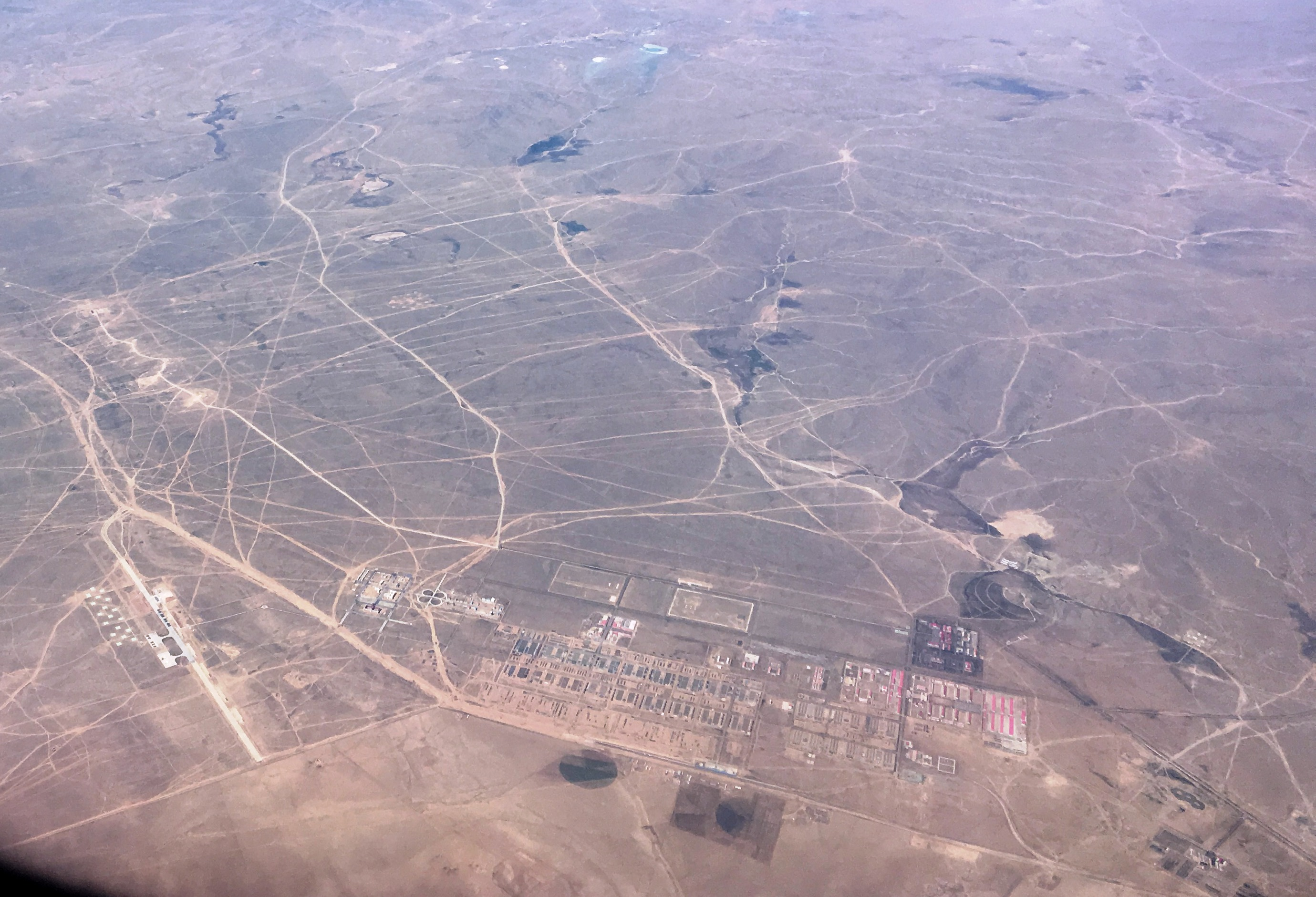
- Chahan Aobao military base southwest of Zhurihe Township.

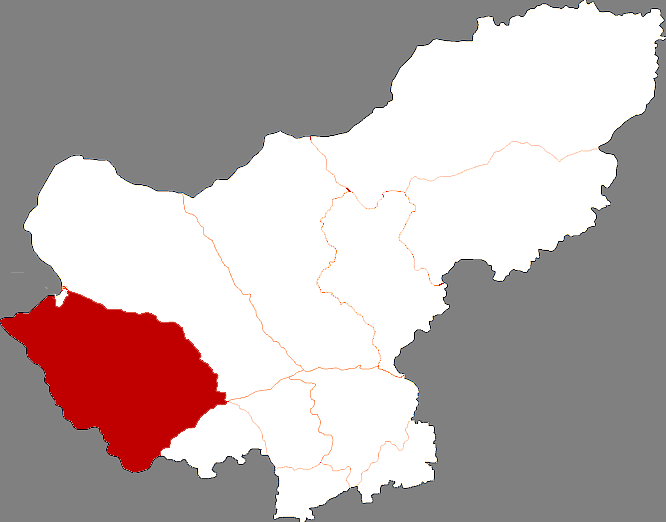
- Sonid Right Banner in Xilin Gol

- Xilin Gol in Inner Mongolia

- Location in Inner Mongolia Sonid Right (China)
- Coordinates: 42°44′49″N 112°39′36″E
- Country: China
- Autonomous region: Inner Mongolia
- League: Xilin Gol
- Banner seat: Saihan Tal

Area
  - Total: 22,450 km^{2} (8,670 sq mi)

Population (2020)
  - Total: 62,402
  - Density: 2.780/km^{2} (7.199/sq mi)
- Time zone: UTC+8 (China Standard)
- Website: www.sntyq.gov.cn

Sonid Right Banner

Chinese name
- Simplified Chinese: 苏尼特右旗
- Traditional Chinese: 蘇尼特右旗
Transcriptions
Standard Mandarin
- Hanyu Pinyin: Sūnítè Yòu Qí

Mongolian name
- Mongolian Cyrillic: Сөнөд баруун хошуу
- Mongolian script: ᠰᠥᠨᠡᠳ ᠪᠠᠷᠠᠭᠤᠨ ᠬᠣᠰᠢᠭᠤ
Transcriptions
- SASM/GNC: Söned Baraɣun qosiɣu

Sonid Right Banner (Mongolian: ᠰᠥᠨᠡᠳ
ᠪᠠᠷᠠᠭᠤᠨ
ᠬᠣᠰᠢᠭᠤ; Chinese: 苏尼特右旗) is a banner of Inner Mongolia, China, bordering Dornogovi Province of Mongolia to the northwest. It is under the administration of Xilingol League. Sunud Mongols inhabit it.

== Demographics ==
The proportion of nationalities in Sonid Right Banner (2020)
Nationality	Percentage
Han	64.9%
Mongols	34.1%
Manchus	0.4%
Hui People	0.4%
Daur	0.1%
Others	0.1%
Source of the population statistics :

== History ==
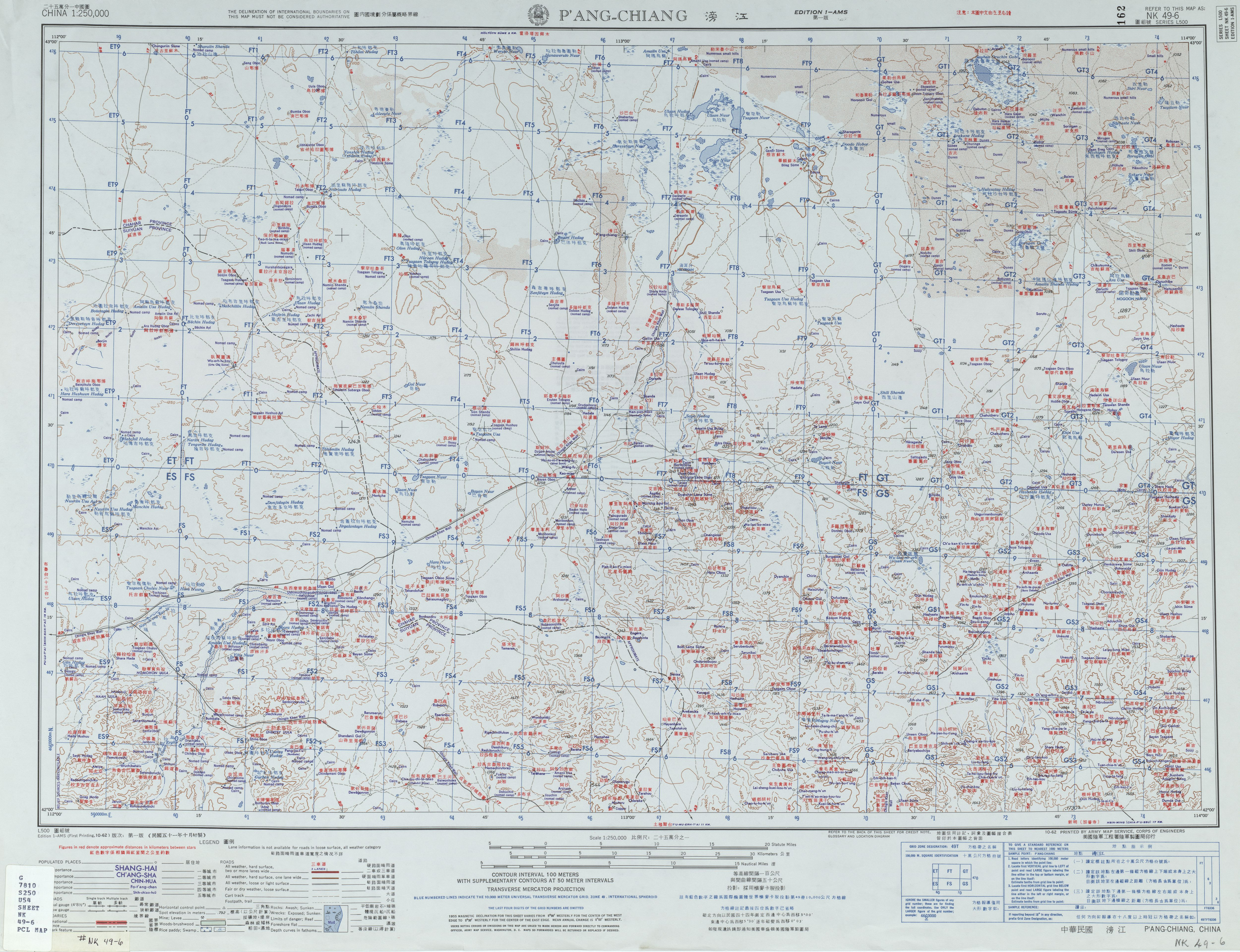
Map including modern-day Sonid Right Banner area (AMS, 1962)

For a few months in 1945, it was the capital of the Inner Mongolian People's Republic, before it was taken over by the Communist Chinese government.

== Administrative divisions ==
Sonid Right Banner is divided into 3 towns and 4 sums.

Name	Simplified Chinese	Hanyu Pinyin	Mongolian (Hudum Script)	Mongolian (Cyrillic)	Administrative division code
Towns
Saihan Tal Town	赛汉塔拉镇	Sàihàntǎlā Zhèn	ᠰᠠᠢᠬᠠᠨᠲᠠᠯ᠎ᠠ ᠪᠠᠯᠭᠠᠰᠤ	Сайхантал балгас	152524100
Jurh Town	朱日和镇	Zhūrìhé Zhèn	ᠵᠢᠷᠦᠬᠡ ᠪᠠᠯᠭᠠᠰᠤ	Зүрх балгас	152524101
Orgon Tal Town	乌日根塔拉镇	Wūrìgēntǎlā Zhèn	ᠥᠷᠭᠡᠨᠲᠠᠯ᠎ᠠ ᠪᠠᠯᠭᠠᠰᠤ	Өргөнтал балгас	152524102
Sums
Sang Bulag Sum	桑宝拉格苏木	Sāngbǎolāgé Sūmù	ᠰᠠᠩᠪᠤᠯᠠᠭ ᠰᠤᠮᠤ	Санбулаг сум	152524200
Eren Nur Sum	额仁淖尔苏木	Érénnào'ěr Sūmù	ᠡᠷᠢᠶᠡᠨᠨᠠᠭᠤᠷ ᠰᠤᠮᠤ	Эрээннуур сум	152524201
Saihan Olji Sum	赛罕乌力吉苏木	Sàihǎnwūlìjí Sūmù	ᠰᠠᠢᠬᠠᠨᠥ᠌ᠯᠵᠢ ᠰᠤᠮᠤ	Сайхан-Өлзий сум	152524202
Aqit Ul Sum	阿其图乌拉苏木	Ãqítúwūlā Sūmù	ᠠᠴᠢᠲᠤᠠ᠋ᠭᠤᠯᠠ ᠰᠤᠮᠤ	Ачит-Уул сум	152524203

Other: Sonid Right Banner Jurh Industrial Park (苏尼特右旗朱日和工业园)

== Climate ==
Climate data for Sonid Right Banner, elevation 1,105 m (3,625 ft), (1991–2020 normals, extremes 1991–present)
Month	Jan	Feb	Mar	Apr	May	Jun	Jul	Aug	Sep	Oct	Nov	Dec	Year
Record high °C (°F)	8.5 (47.3)	16.5 (61.7)	24.0 (75.2)	31.7 (89.1)	37.0 (98.6)	39.7 (103.5)	40.5 (104.9)	36.6 (97.9)	36.2 (97.2)	28.7 (83.7)	19.8 (67.6)	11.7 (53.1)	40.5 (104.9)
Mean daily maximum °C (°F)	−7.8 (18.0)	−2.4 (27.7)	5.9 (42.6)	15.1 (59.2)	22.3 (72.1)	27.4 (81.3)	30.0 (86.0)	28.1 (82.6)	22.2 (72.0)	13.3 (55.9)	2.6 (36.7)	−5.8 (21.6)	12.6 (54.6)
Daily mean °C (°F)	−14.3 (6.3)	−9.7 (14.5)	−1.5 (29.3)	7.9 (46.2)	15.5 (59.9)	21.1 (70.0)	24.0 (75.2)	21.8 (71.2)	15.4 (59.7)	6.3 (43.3)	−3.8 (25.2)	−11.8 (10.8)	5.9 (42.6)
Mean daily minimum °C (°F)	−19.1 (−2.4)	−15.2 (4.6)	−7.6 (18.3)	1.0 (33.8)	8.4 (47.1)	14.5 (58.1)	17.7 (63.9)	15.8 (60.4)	9.4 (48.9)	0.9 (33.6)	−8.6 (16.5)	−16.4 (2.5)	0.1 (32.1)
Record low °C (°F)	−35.4 (−31.7)	−32.5 (−26.5)	−26.6 (−15.9)	−14.1 (6.6)	−6.3 (20.7)	3.1 (37.6)	8.1 (46.6)	5.4 (41.7)	−2.4 (27.7)	−14.2 (6.4)	−28.2 (−18.8)	−31.4 (−24.5)	−35.4 (−31.7)
Average precipitation mm (inches)	1.8 (0.07)	2.2 (0.09)	4.1 (0.16)	6.7 (0.26)	17.6 (0.69)	32.5 (1.28)	43.2 (1.70)	38.2 (1.50)	21.8 (0.86)	9.5 (0.37)	4.6 (0.18)	2.2 (0.09)	184.4 (7.25)
Average precipitation days (≥ 0.1 mm)	3.6	3.3	3.3	3.2	5.4	7.7	8.9	7.8	6.2	3.8	3.9	4.0	61.1
Average snowy days	5.7	5.1	4.4	2.7	0.7	0	0	0	0.3	2.0	5.5	6.6	33
Average relative humidity (%)	61	51	37	29	31	39	46	48	44	45	52	59	45
Mean monthly sunshine hours	220.4	227.1	273.3	284.8	307.6	298.4	304.9	295.0	269.3	254.1	213.8	198.0	3,146.7
Percentage possible sunshine	75	75	73	70	68	65	66	70	73	76	74	71	71
Source: China Meteorological Administration

Climate data for Zhurihe Town, Sonid Right Banner, elevation 1,151 m (3,776 ft), (1991–2020 normals)
Month	Jan	Feb	Mar	Apr	May	Jun	Jul	Aug	Sep	Oct	Nov	Dec	Year
Mean daily maximum °C (°F)	−7.2 (19.0)	−2.1 (28.2)	6.0 (42.8)	14.9 (58.8)	22.1 (71.8)	27.0 (80.6)	29.7 (85.5)	27.7 (81.9)	22.0 (71.6)	13.3 (55.9)	2.9 (37.2)	−5.3 (22.5)	12.6 (54.7)
Daily mean °C (°F)	−13.7 (7.3)	−9.3 (15.3)	−1.4 (29.5)	7.8 (46.0)	15.3 (59.5)	20.7 (69.3)	23.4 (74.1)	21.4 (70.5)	15.1 (59.2)	6.3 (43.3)	−3.5 (25.7)	−11.3 (11.7)	5.9 (42.6)
Mean daily minimum °C (°F)	−18.6 (−1.5)	−14.8 (5.4)	−7.4 (18.7)	1.0 (33.8)	8.3 (46.9)	14.1 (57.4)	17.3 (63.1)	15.4 (59.7)	9.1 (48.4)	0.9 (33.6)	−8.4 (16.9)	−16.0 (3.2)	0.1 (32.1)
Average precipitation mm (inches)	1.6 (0.06)	2.4 (0.09)	3.7 (0.15)	7.6 (0.30)	18.5 (0.73)	36.6 (1.44)	51.4 (2.02)	36.1 (1.42)	28.0 (1.10)	11.0 (0.43)	5.0 (0.20)	2.3 (0.09)	204.2 (8.03)
Average precipitation days (≥ 0.1 mm)	3.1	3.3	3.5	3.8	5.8	8.3	9.7	8.0	6.7	4.5	4.2	4.0	64.9
Average snowy days	6.3	5.5	4.8	2.9	0.7	0	0	0	0.4	2.3	5.9	7.2	36
Average relative humidity (%)	58	50	39	30	32	40	48	49	45	45	52	57	45
Mean monthly sunshine hours	220.5	223.9	265.4	277.1	300.7	288.8	291.2	287.5	258.6	250.5	212.8	202.9	3,079.9
Percentage possible sunshine	75	74	71	69	66	63	63	68	70	74	74	72	70
Source: China Meteorological Administration

== Websites ==
- www.xzqh.org (in Chinese)
