= Plain Blue Banner, Inner Mongolia =

Plain Blue Banner 正蓝旗 • ᠰᠢᠯᠤᠭᠤᠨ ᠬᠥᠬᠡ ᠬᠣᠰᠢᠭᠤ Zhenglan, Xulun Hoh, Shuluun Huh
- Banner
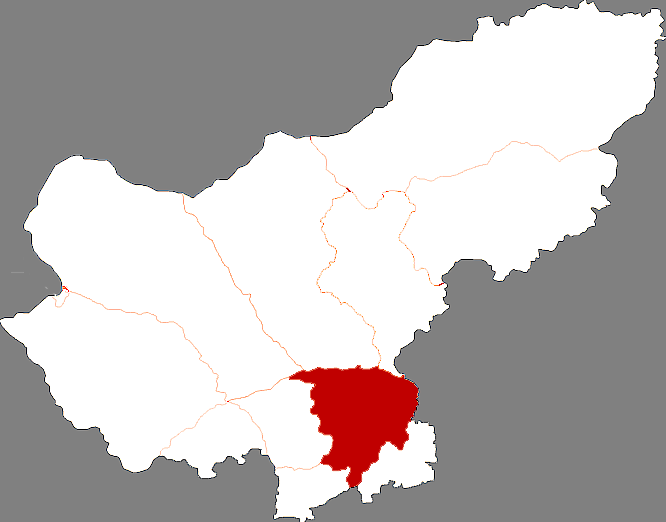
- Plain Blue Banner in Xilin Gol League

- Location in Inner Mongolia Plain Blue (China)
- Coordinates: 42°14′31″N 115°59′31″E
- Country: China
- Autonomous region: Inner Mongolia
- League: Xilin Gol
- Banner seat: Shangdu Town (Xangd)

Area
  - Total: 10,210 km^{2} (3,940 sq mi)

Population (2020)
  - Total: 69,908
  - Density: 6.847/km^{2} (17.73/sq mi)
- Time zone: UTC+8 (China Standard)
- Website: www.zlq.gov.cn

Plain Blue Banner, Inner Mongolia

Chinese name
- Simplified Chinese: 正蓝旗
- Traditional Chinese: 正藍旗
Transcriptions
Standard Mandarin
- Hanyu Pinyin: Zhènglán Qí

Mongolian name
- Mongolian Cyrillic: Шулуун хөх хошуу
- Mongolian script: ᠰᠢᠯᠤᠭᠤᠨ ᠬᠥᠬᠡ ᠬᠣᠰᠢᠭᠤ
Transcriptions
- SASM/GNC: Shuluun höh hoshuu

Plain Blue Banner (Mongolian: ᠰᠢᠯᠤᠭᠤᠨ ᠬᠥᠬᠡ ᠬᠣᠰᠢᠭᠤ, pronounced [ʃʊˈɮʊːɴ xɵx χɞˈʃʊ]; Chinese: 正蓝旗), alternatively Zhenglan Banner in Chinese or Xulun Hoh Banner in Mongolian, is a banner of Inner Mongolia, China, bordering Hebei province to the south. It is under the administration of Xilin Gol League. Shangdu (Xanadu), the summer capital of the Yuan dynasty, was located here. Today the ruins of Shangdu are listed as a UNESCO World Heritage Site and are open to the public.

The Plain Blue Banner was one of the Eight Banners of Chahar during the Qing dynasty.

== Demographics ==
The proportion of nationalities in Plain Blue Banner (2020)
Nationality	Percentage
Han	54.6%
Mongols	40.3%
Manchus	3.9%
Hui People	0.9%
Daur	0.1%
Miao (Hmong)	0.1%
Others	0.1%
Source of the population statistics :

== Administrative divisions ==
Plain Blue Banner is divided into 3 towns and 4 sums.

Name	Simplified Chinese	Hanyu Pinyin	Mongolian (Hudum Script)	Mongolian (Cyrillic)	Administrative division code
Towns
Shangdu Town (Xangd)	上都镇	Shàngdū Zhèn	ᠱᠠᠩᠳᠤ ᠪᠠᠯᠭᠠᠰᠤ	Шанд балгас	152530100
Sanggin Dalai Town	桑根达来镇	Sānggēndálái Zhèn	ᠰᠠᠩ ᠤᠨ ᠳᠠᠯᠠᠢ ᠪᠠᠯᠭᠠᠰᠤ	Сангийн Далай балгас	152530101
Habirag Town	哈毕日嘎镇	Hābìrìgā Zhèn	ᠬᠠᠪᠢᠷᠭ᠎ᠠ ᠪᠠᠯᠭᠠᠰᠤ	Хавирга балгас	152530102
Sums
Boxodoi Sum	宝绍岱苏木	Bǎoshàodài Sūmù	ᠪᠣᠱᠣᠣᠳᠠᠢ ᠰᠤᠮᠤ	Буушуудай сум	152530200
Nart Sum	那日图苏木	Nàrìtú Sūmù	ᠨᠠᠷᠠᠲᠤ ᠰᠤᠮᠤ	Нарт сум	152530201
Sain Hudag Sum	赛音呼都嘎苏木	Sàiyīnhūdūgā Sūmù	ᠰᠠᠢᠨᠬᠤᠳᠳᠤᠭ ᠰᠤᠮᠤ	Сайнхудаг сум	152530202
Jagastai Sum	扎格斯台苏木	Zhāgésītái Sūmù	ᠵᠢᠭᠠᠰᠤᠲᠠᠢ ᠰᠤᠮᠤ	Жагастай сум	152530203
Others
Wuyi Breeding Stock Farm	五一种畜场	Wǔyī Zhǒngchùchǎng	ᠡᠦ ᠢ ᠮᠠᠯᠵᠢᠯ ᠤᠨ ᠲᠠᠯᠠᠪᠠᠢ	Үү И малжлын талбай	152530500
Heichengzi Demonstration Plot	黑城子示范区	Hēichéngzǐ Shìfànqū	ᠪᠣᠷᠣᠬᠣᠲᠠ ᠵᠢᠱᠢᠶ᠎ᠡ ᠦᠵᠡᠭᠦᠯᠬᠦ ᠲᠣᠭᠣᠷᠢᠭ	Борхот жишээ үзүүлэх дугараг	152530501

== Climate ==
The area has a cold semi arid climate (Koppen: BSk).

Climate data for Plain Blue Banner, elevation 1,316 m (4,318 ft), (1991–2020 normals, extremes 1981–2010)
Month	Jan	Feb	Mar	Apr	May	Jun	Jul	Aug	Sep	Oct	Nov	Dec	Year
Record high °C (°F)	5.8 (42.4)	12.2 (54.0)	20.7 (69.3)	29.0 (84.2)	33.1 (91.6)	35.2 (95.4)	36.6 (97.9)	33.6 (92.5)	32.3 (90.1)	24.6 (76.3)	18.1 (64.6)	10.7 (51.3)	36.6 (97.9)
Mean daily maximum °C (°F)	−10.2 (13.6)	−5.0 (23.0)	3.4 (38.1)	12.4 (54.3)	19.5 (67.1)	24.0 (75.2)	26.0 (78.8)	24.7 (76.5)	19.6 (67.3)	11.1 (52.0)	0.5 (32.9)	−8.1 (17.4)	9.8 (49.7)
Daily mean °C (°F)	−16.4 (2.5)	−12.2 (10.0)	−3.7 (25.3)	5.2 (41.4)	12.4 (54.3)	17.4 (63.3)	19.9 (67.8)	18.2 (64.8)	12.3 (54.1)	3.9 (39.0)	−5.9 (21.4)	−14.0 (6.8)	3.1 (37.6)
Mean daily minimum °C (°F)	−21.5 (−6.7)	−18.1 (−0.6)	−9.9 (14.2)	−1.8 (28.8)	5.1 (41.2)	10.6 (51.1)	14.1 (57.4)	12.1 (53.8)	5.9 (42.6)	−1.9 (28.6)	−11.0 (12.2)	−18.8 (−1.8)	−2.9 (26.7)
Record low °C (°F)	−38.2 (−36.8)	−34.0 (−29.2)	−28.7 (−19.7)	−17.4 (0.7)	−8.1 (17.4)	−5.4 (22.3)	4.7 (40.5)	0.4 (32.7)	−8.2 (17.2)	−17.9 (−0.2)	−31.9 (−25.4)	−32.8 (−27.0)	−38.2 (−36.8)
Average precipitation mm (inches)	2.4 (0.09)	3.5 (0.14)	5.9 (0.23)	15.6 (0.61)	36.7 (1.44)	64.2 (2.53)	101.7 (4.00)	69.8 (2.75)	44.0 (1.73)	19.8 (0.78)	8.8 (0.35)	2.9 (0.11)	375.3 (14.76)
Average precipitation days (≥ 0.1 mm)	4.7	4.6	5.1	5.3	8.2	12.4	13.8	10.7	9.1	6.3	5.6	5.6	91.4
Average snowy days	10.6	9.0	8.2	4.9	1.4	0	0	0	0.3	4.2	9.0	12.7	60.3
Average relative humidity (%)	69	63	50	41	43	55	66	66	59	56	61	68	58
Mean monthly sunshine hours	220.7	228.1	276.4	275.7	299.9	285.7	280.1	280.7	255.4	248.0	212.0	203.8	3,066.5
Percentage possible sunshine	75	76	74	68	66	63	61	66	69	73	73	73	70
Source: China Meteorological Administration

== See also ==
- Plain Blue Banner
- Chakhar Mongolian, Mongolian dialect spoken in Plain Blue Banner
