= Hure Banner =

Hure Banner 库伦旗 • ᠬᠦᠷᠢᠶ᠎ᠡ ᠬᠣᠰᠢᠭᠤ
- Banner
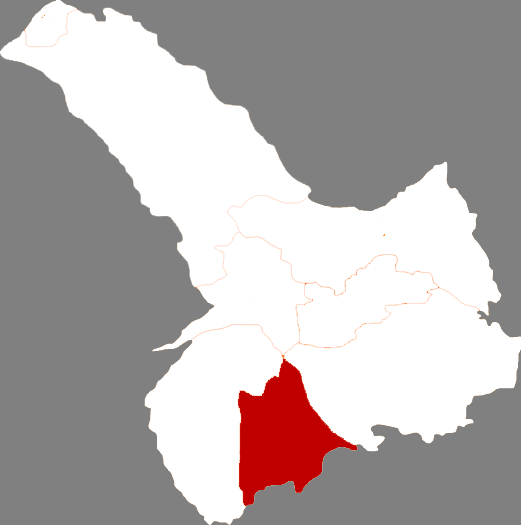
- Location in Tongliao, Inner Mongolia, China

- Location in Inner Mongolia Hure (China)
- Coordinates: 42°44′N 121°47′E
- Country: China
- Autonomous region: Inner Mongolia
- Prefecture-level city: Tongliao
- Banner seat: Hure Town

Area
  - Total: 4,650 km^{2} (1,800 sq mi)
- Elevation: 261 m (856 ft)

Population (2020)
  - Total: 151,133
  - Density: 32.5/km^{2} (84.2/sq mi)
- Time zone: UTC+8 (China Standard)
- Postal code: 028200
- Area code: 0475
- Website: www.kulun.gov.cn

Hure Banner

Chinese name
- Simplified Chinese: 库伦旗
- Traditional Chinese: 庫倫旗
Transcriptions
Standard Mandarin
- Hanyu Pinyin: Kùlún Qí

Mongolian name
- Mongolian Cyrillic: Хүрээ хошуу
- Mongolian script: ᠬᠦᠷᠢᠶ᠎ᠡ ᠬᠣᠰᠢᠭᠤ
Transcriptions
- SASM/GNC: Küriy-e qosiɣu

Hure Banner (Mongolian: ᠬᠦᠷᠢᠶ᠎ᠡ ᠬᠣᠰᠢᠭᠤ; Chinese: 库伦旗) is a banner of southeastern Inner Mongolia, China, bordering Liaoning province to the south. It is under the administration of Tongliao City, 106 kilometres (66 mi) to the north-northeast.

== Demographics ==
The proportion of nationalities in Hure Banner (2020)
Nationality	Percentage
Mongols	58.3%
Han	38.6%
Manchus	2.3%
Hui People	0.7%
Others	0.1%
Source of the population statistics :

== Administrative divisions ==
Hure Banner is made up of 1 subdistrict, 5 towns, 1 township, and 2 sums.

Name	Simplified Chinese	Hanyu Pinyin	Mongolian (Hudum Script)	Mongolian (Cyrillic)	Administrative division code
Subdistricts
Hure Subdistrict	库伦街道	Kùlún Jiēdào	ᠬᠦᠷᠢᠶ᠎ᠡ ᠵᠡᠭᠡᠯᠢ ᠭᠤᠳᠤᠮᠵᠢ	Хүрээ Зээл гудамж	150524400
Towns
Hure Town	库伦镇	Kùlún Zhèn	ᠬᠦᠷᠢᠶ᠎ᠡ ᠪᠠᠯᠭᠠᠰᠤ	Хүрээ балгас	150524100
Kouhezi Town (Hohon Town)	扣河子镇	Kòuhézǐ Zhèn	ᠬᠥᠬᠥᠨ ᠪᠠᠯᠭᠠᠰᠤ	Хөхөн балгас	150524101
Bayan Hua Town	白音花镇	Báiyīnhuā Zhèn	ᠪᠠᠶᠠᠨᠬᠤᠸᠠ ᠪᠠᠯᠭᠠᠰᠤ	Баянхуа балгас	150524102
Liujiazi Town	六家子镇	Liùjiāzi Zhèn	ᠯᠢᠦ ᠵᠢᠶᠠᠽᠢ ᠪᠠᠯᠭᠠᠰᠤ	Лиу жаази балгас	150524103
Elsen Town	额勒顺镇	Élèshùn Zhèn	ᠡᠯᠡᠰᠦᠨ ᠪᠠᠯᠭᠠᠰᠤ	Элсэн балгас	150524104
Township
Shuiquan Township	水泉乡	Shuǐquán Xiāng	ᠱᠦᠢ ᠴᠢᠦᠸᠠᠨ ᠰᠢᠶᠠᠩ	Шүй чиован шиян	150524202
Sums
Manghan Sum	茫汗苏木	Mánghàn Sūmù	ᠮᠠᠩᠬᠠᠨ ᠰᠤᠮᠤ	Манхан сум	150524200
Xianjin Sum	先进苏木	Xiānjìn Sūmù	ᠰᠢᠶᠠᠨᠵᠢᠨ ᠰᠤᠮᠤ	Шанзон сум	150524201

== Climate ==
Climate data for Hure Banner, elevation 279 m (915 ft), (1991–2020 normals, extremes 1981–present)
Month	Jan	Feb	Mar	Apr	May	Jun	Jul	Aug	Sep	Oct	Nov	Dec	Year
Record high °C (°F)	9.3 (48.7)	18.1 (64.6)	26.4 (79.5)	31.8 (89.2)	36.0 (96.8)	38.8 (101.8)	41.0 (105.8)	37.8 (100.0)	34.4 (93.9)	30.1 (86.2)	19.4 (66.9)	15.2 (59.4)	41.0 (105.8)
Mean daily maximum °C (°F)	−5.8 (21.6)	−0.8 (30.6)	6.6 (43.9)	16.1 (61.0)	23.4 (74.1)	27.5 (81.5)	29.2 (84.6)	28.1 (82.6)	23.7 (74.7)	15.2 (59.4)	4.1 (39.4)	−4.0 (24.8)	13.6 (56.5)
Daily mean °C (°F)	−11.4 (11.5)	−7.0 (19.4)	0.4 (32.7)	9.9 (49.8)	17.2 (63.0)	21.8 (71.2)	24.1 (75.4)	22.8 (73.0)	17.4 (63.3)	9.0 (48.2)	−1.4 (29.5)	−9.3 (15.3)	7.8 (46.0)
Mean daily minimum °C (°F)	−15.8 (3.6)	−12.0 (10.4)	−5.1 (22.8)	4.0 (39.2)	11.1 (52.0)	16.4 (61.5)	19.7 (67.5)	18.2 (64.8)	11.7 (53.1)	3.6 (38.5)	−6.0 (21.2)	−13.5 (7.7)	2.7 (36.9)
Record low °C (°F)	−29.1 (−20.4)	−25.8 (−14.4)	−18.0 (−0.4)	−9.1 (15.6)	1.5 (34.7)	5.4 (41.7)	12.5 (54.5)	8.9 (48.0)	0.5 (32.9)	−11.5 (11.3)	−19.4 (−2.9)	−25.3 (−13.5)	−29.1 (−20.4)
Average precipitation mm (inches)	1.8 (0.07)	2.2 (0.09)	8.0 (0.31)	19.0 (0.75)	39.8 (1.57)	78.9 (3.11)	115.7 (4.56)	85.1 (3.35)	27.6 (1.09)	18.1 (0.71)	9.6 (0.38)	2.6 (0.10)	408.4 (16.09)
Average precipitation days (≥ 0.1 mm)	2.0	2.3	3.2	5.1	7.7	11.3	11.5	9.8	6.2	3.9	3.1	2.5	68.6
Average snowy days	3.1	3.4	3.6	1.8	0	0	0	0	0	1.2	3.8	4.0	20.9
Average relative humidity (%)	50	43	40	38	43	59	71	71	58	50	49	52	52
Mean monthly sunshine hours	236.0	235.4	275.1	265.5	288.0	265.0	229.6	247.9	261.7	250.5	210.6	214.8	2,980.1
Percentage possible sunshine	81	79	74	66	63	58	50	58	71	74	73	77	69
Source: China Meteorological Administration October all-time Record
