= Ujimqin =

Ujimqin (also Ujumqin, Ujumucin, Ujumchin, Uzemchin or Üzemchin) may refer to:

- East Ujimqin Banner, subdivision of Inner Mongolia, China
- West Ujimqin Banner, subdivision of Inner Mongolia, China
- Üzemchin Mongols or their language
