= Bordered Yellow Banner, Inner Mongolia =

Bordered Yellow Banner 镶黄旗 • ᠬᠥᠪᠡᠭᠡᠲᠦ ᠰᠢᠷ᠎ᠠ ᠬᠣᠰᠢᠭᠤ Xianghuang, Hobot Xar
- Banner
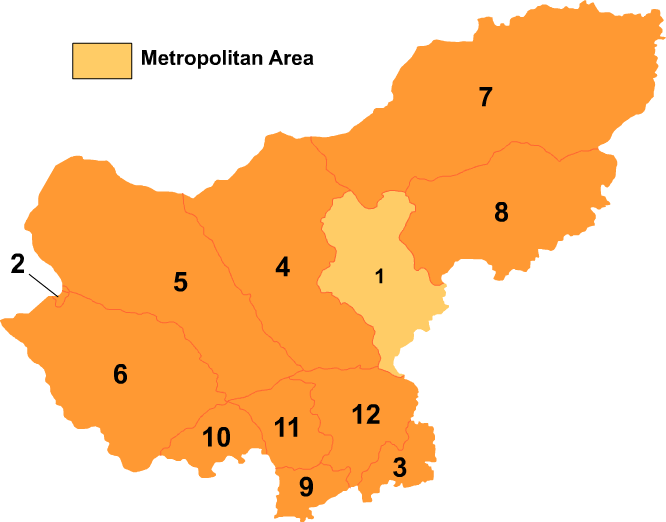
- Divisions of Xilingol; Bordered Yellow Banner is 10 on this map

- Location of the seat in Inner Mongolia Bordered Yellow (China)
- Coordinates: 42°13′44″N 113°51′00″E
- Country: China
- Autonomous region: Inner Mongolia
- League: Xilin Gol
- Banner seat: Xin Bulag

Area
  - Total: 5,137.27 km^{2} (1,983.51 sq mi)

Population (2020)
  - Total: 27,399
  - Density: 5.3334/km^{2} (13.813/sq mi)
- Time zone: UTC+8 (China Standard)
- Website: www.nmxhq.gov.cn

Bordered Yellow Banner, Inner Mongolia

Chinese name
- Simplified Chinese: 镶黄旗
- Traditional Chinese: 鑲黃旗
Transcriptions
Standard Mandarin
- Hanyu Pinyin: Xiānghuáng Qí

Mongolian name
- Mongolian Cyrillic: Хөвөөт Шар хошуу
- Mongolian script: ᠬᠥᠪᠡᠭᠡᠲᠦ ᠰᠢᠷ᠎ᠠ ᠬᠣᠰᠢᠭᠤ
Transcriptions
- SASM/GNC: Köbegetü Sir-a qosiɣu

Bordered Yellow Banner (Mongolian: ᠬᠥᠪᠡᠭᠡᠲᠦ ᠰᠢᠷ᠎ᠠ ᠬᠣᠰᠢᠭᠤ; Chinese: 镶黄旗), alternatively Xianghuang Banner in Chinese or Hobot Xar Banner in Mongolian, is a banner of Inner Mongolia, China. It is under the administration of Xilin Gol League.

The Bordered Yellow Banner was one of the Eight Banners of Chahar during the Qing dynasty.

== Demographics ==
The proportion of nationalities in Bordered Yellow Banner (2020)
Nationality	Percentage
Mongols	57.3%
Han	41.9%
Manchus	0.3%
Hui People	0.1%
Tujia	0.1%
Others	0.3%
Source of the population statistics :

== Administrative divisions ==
Bordered Yellow Banner is divided into 2 towns and 2 sums.

Name	Simplified Chinese	Hanyu Pinyin	Mongolian (Hudum Script)	Mongolian (Cyrillic)	Administrative division code
Towns
Xin Bulag Town	新宝拉格镇	Xīnbǎolāgé Zhèn	ᠰᠢᠨᠡᠪᠤᠯᠠᠭ ᠪᠠᠯᠭᠠᠰᠤ	Шинэбулаг балгас	152528100
Bayan Tal Town	巴彦塔拉镇	Bāyàntǎlā Zhèn	ᠪᠠᠶᠠᠨᠲᠠᠯ᠎ᠠ ᠪᠠᠯᠭᠠᠰᠤ	Баянтөл балгас	152528101
Sums
Onggon Ul Sum	翁贡乌拉苏木	Wēnggòngwūlā Sūmù	ᠣᠩᠭᠣᠨ ᠠᠭᠤᠯᠠ ᠰᠤᠮᠤ	Онгон уул сум	152528200
Bogdin Gol Sum	宝格达音高勒苏木	Bǎogédáyīngāolè Sūmù	ᠪᠣᠭᠳᠠ ᠶᠢᠨ ᠭᠣᠣᠯ ᠰᠤᠮᠤ	Богдын гол сум	152528201

== Climate ==
Climate data for Bordered Yellow Banner, elevation 1,322 m (4,337 ft), (1991–2020 normals, extremes 1981–2010)
Month	Jan	Feb	Mar	Apr	May	Jun	Jul	Aug	Sep	Oct	Nov	Dec	Year
Record high °C (°F)	7.0 (44.6)	14.5 (58.1)	21.8 (71.2)	31.4 (88.5)	33.8 (92.8)	38.7 (101.7)	37.1 (98.8)	34.1 (93.4)	34.4 (93.9)	26.0 (78.8)	19.4 (66.9)	11.1 (52.0)	38.7 (101.7)
Mean daily maximum °C (°F)	−8.3 (17.1)	−3.5 (25.7)	4.4 (39.9)	13.3 (55.9)	20.3 (68.5)	25.1 (77.2)	27.5 (81.5)	25.8 (78.4)	20.3 (68.5)	11.8 (53.2)	1.6 (34.9)	−6.4 (20.5)	11.0 (51.8)
Daily mean °C (°F)	−15.0 (5.0)	−10.8 (12.6)	−2.6 (27.3)	6.3 (43.3)	13.6 (56.5)	19.0 (66.2)	21.6 (70.9)	19.7 (67.5)	13.7 (56.7)	4.9 (40.8)	−4.8 (23.4)	−12.5 (9.5)	4.4 (40.0)
Mean daily minimum °C (°F)	−20.0 (−4.0)	−16.3 (2.7)	−8.7 (16.3)	−0.5 (31.1)	6.6 (43.9)	12.4 (54.3)	15.6 (60.1)	13.7 (56.7)	7.5 (45.5)	−0.6 (30.9)	−9.8 (14.4)	−17.4 (0.7)	−1.5 (29.4)
Record low °C (°F)	−35.8 (−32.4)	−32.2 (−26.0)	−28.0 (−18.4)	−15.5 (4.1)	−8.0 (17.6)	−1.2 (29.8)	5.6 (42.1)	3.5 (38.3)	−5.4 (22.3)	−16.0 (3.2)	−28.9 (−20.0)	−33.0 (−27.4)	−35.8 (−32.4)
Average precipitation mm (inches)	2.6 (0.10)	3.0 (0.12)	5.8 (0.23)	10.3 (0.41)	26.1 (1.03)	43.3 (1.70)	68.3 (2.69)	44.4 (1.75)	33.9 (1.33)	16.0 (0.63)	7.5 (0.30)	3.5 (0.14)	264.7 (10.43)
Average precipitation days (≥ 0.1 mm)	6.2	5.2	5.0	4.9	6.9	9.9	11.6	9.5	7.8	5.2	6.0	6.2	84.4
Average snowy days	9.1	7.8	7.0	4.2	1.1	0	0	0	0.5	3.3	8.0	10.1	51.1
Average relative humidity (%)	66	59	45	35	36	46	55	56	51	51	58	65	52
Mean monthly sunshine hours	219.0	222.9	261.6	275.2	293.6	275.7	271.1	275.2	244.2	242.1	209.3	199.0	2,988.9
Percentage possible sunshine	74	74	70	68	65	61	59	65	66	72	72	71	68
Source: China Meteorological Administration

== See also ==
- Bordered Yellow Banner
