= Eight Banners of Chahar =

Administrative division of the Qing dynasty

Territories of the Eight Banners of Chahar in 1911

The Eight Banners of Chahar (Note: Simplified Chinese: 八旗察哈尔; traditional Chinese: 八旗察哈爾; Mongolian: ᠴᠠᠬᠠᠷ ᠨᠠᠢᠮᠠᠨ ᠬᠣᠰᠢᠭᠤ) were an administrative system established by the Qing dynasty for the Chahar Mongols.

The Chahars were conquered by the Qing in 1635. The Qing initially placed the tribe under the Jasak banner system, with Ejei, son of the Ligdan Khan of the Chahars, as its head. Ejei was succeeded by his brother Abunai, who rebelled against the Qing in 1675. After the rebellion was crushed, the Chahars were resettled to their present location north of the Great Wall between Xuanhua and Datong. It is generally believed that the Qing abolished the Jasak banner after Abunai's defeat and reorganized the Chahars into a new system in imitation of the Eight Banners of the Qing. However, some scholars have recently suggested that the Chahar Eight Banners had been established during the early Qing period and coexisted with the Jasak banner. The Eight Banners were directly overseen by the military governor of the Mongol Eight Banners in Beijing rather than by local Mongol princes.

During the Qianlong period, the Chahars were removed from the jurisdiction of the Mongol Eight Banners in Beijing, and instead a new official post known as the Chahar Military Governor (察哈尔都统) was established in Zhangjiakou (Kalgan). Kharachin and Khuuchid Mongols lived among the Chahars, but were governed separately by the Mongol Eight Banners.

Many Mongols fleeing the Dzungar–Qing Wars were resettled into the Chahar Eight Banners during the Kangxi period. They included northern Mongols such as those from the Khalkha and Barga tribes, as well as Oirats and members of the southern tribes of Muumyangan and Sunud, making the Chahar lands some of the most diverse among Mongol territories. After the Dzungar Khanate was defeated, some surrendered Oirats were also incorporated into the Chahar banners.

== Banners ==
Right Wing

- Plain Yellow Banner – today's Chahar Right Front Banner
- Bordered Red Banner – part of today's Chahar Right Middle Banner
- Plain Red Banner – today's Chahar Right Rear Banner
- Bordered Blue Banner – part of today's Chahar Right Middle Banner

Left Wing

- Bordered Yellow Banner
- Bordered White Banner – part of today's Plain and Bordered White Banner
- Plain White Banner – part of today's Plain and Bordered White Banner
- Plain Blue Banner
