= East Ujimqin Banner =

East Ujimqin Banner 东乌珠穆沁旗 • ᠵᠡᠭᠦᠨ ᠤᠵᠤᠮᠤᠴᠢᠨ ᠬᠣᠰᠢᠭᠤ
- Banner
- Location in Inner Mongolia East Ujimqin (China)
- Coordinates: 45°31′N 116°58′E
- Country: China
- Autonomous region: Inner Mongolia
- League: Xilin Gol
- Banner seat: Uliastai

Area
  - Total: 54,545 km^{2} (21,060 sq mi)
- Elevation: 839 m (2,753 ft)

Population (2020)
  - Total: 94,076
  - Density: 1.7247/km^{2} (4.4671/sq mi)
- Time zone: UTC+8 (China Standard)
- Postal code: 026300
- Website: www.dwq.gov.cn

East Ujimqin Banner

Chinese name
- Simplified Chinese: 东乌珠穆沁旗
- Traditional Chinese: 東烏珠穆沁旗
Transcriptions
Standard Mandarin
- Hanyu Pinyin: Dōng Wūzhūmùqìn Qí

Mongolian name
- Mongolian Cyrillic: Зүүн үзэмчин хошуу
- Mongolian script: ᠵᠡᠭᠦᠨ ᠤᠵᠤᠮᠤᠴᠢᠨ ᠬᠣᠰᠢᠭᠤ
Transcriptions
- SASM/GNC: Jegün Ujumučin qosiɣu

East Ujimqin Banner (Mongolian: ᠵᠡᠭᠦᠨ ᠤᠵᠤᠮᠤᠴᠢᠨ ᠬᠣᠰᠢᠭᠤ; Chinese: 东乌珠穆沁旗) is a banner in the northeast of the Inner Mongolia, China. It is under the administration of Xilin Gol League.

== Demographics ==
East Ujimqin Banner, excluding territories under jurisdiction of "Ulgai Management Area", has a population of 70,610.

The proportion of nationalities in East Ujimqin Banner (2020)
| Nationality | Percentage |
| Mongols | 63.9% |
| Han | 34.9% |
| Manchus | 0.6% |
| Hui People | 0.3% |
| Daur | 0.1% |
| Others | 0.2% |
Source of the population statistics :

Ulgai Management Area, consisting of one county-level city and 3 ranches and pastures, has a population of 23,466 as of 2020.

The proportion of nationalities in Ulgai Management Area (2020)
| Nationality | Percentage |
| Han | 64.0% |
| Mongols | 33.1% |
| Manchus | 2.1% |
| Hui People | 0.6% |
| Daur | 0.1% |
| Others | 0.1% |
Source of the population statistics :

== Geography and climate ==
East Ujimqin features a cold semi-arid climate (Köppen BSk), marked by long, cold and very dry winters, hot, somewhat humid summers, and strong winds, especially in spring. The monthly daily mean temperature in January, the coldest month, is −20.5 °C (−4.9 °F), and in July, the warmest month, 21.4 °C (70.5 °F), with the annual mean at 1.93 °C (35.5 °F). The annual precipitation is approximately 251 mm (9.9 in), with more than half of it falling in July and August alone. Due to the aridity and elevation, diurnal temperature variation often exceeds 15 °C (27 °F) in spring, averaging 13.5 °C (24.3 °F) annually. With monthly percent possible sunshine ranging from 59% in July to 76% in February, sunshine is abundant year-round, with an annual total of 3,006 hours.

Climate data for East Ujimqin, elevation 839 m (2,753 ft), (1991–2020 normals, extremes 1955–present)
| Month | Jan | Feb | Mar | Apr | May | Jun | Jul | Aug | Sep | Oct | Nov | Dec | Year |
|---|---|---|---|---|---|---|---|---|---|---|---|---|---|
| Record high °C (°F) | 2.0 (35.6) | 10.9 (51.6) | 24.9 (76.8) | 30.8 (87.4) | 36.1 (97.0) | 38.7 (101.7) | 40.7 (105.3) | 42.1 (107.8) | 35.0 (95.0) | 29.7 (85.5) | 17.6 (63.7) | 6.2 (43.2) | 42.1 (107.8) |
| Mean daily maximum °C (°F) | −13.4 (7.9) | −7.6 (18.3) | 1.7 (35.1) | 12.8 (55.0) | 20.7 (69.3) | 25.9 (78.6) | 28.4 (83.1) | 26.8 (80.2) | 20.8 (69.4) | 10.9 (51.6) | −1.7 (28.9) | −11.4 (11.5) | 9.5 (49.1) |
| Daily mean °C (°F) | −20.1 (−4.2) | −15.3 (4.5) | −5.8 (21.6) | 5.0 (41.0) | 13.3 (55.9) | 19.3 (66.7) | 22.1 (71.8) | 20.1 (68.2) | 13.1 (55.6) | 3.1 (37.6) | −8.5 (16.7) | −17.4 (0.7) | 2.4 (36.3) |
| Mean daily minimum °C (°F) | −25.4 (−13.7) | −21.5 (−6.7) | −12.4 (9.7) | −2.6 (27.3) | 5.4 (41.7) | 12.3 (54.1) | 16.1 (61.0) | 13.6 (56.5) | 6.2 (43.2) | −3.2 (26.2) | −13.8 (7.2) | −22.3 (−8.1) | −4.0 (24.9) |
| Record low °C (°F) | −40.7 (−41.3) | −39.7 (−39.5) | −37.2 (−35.0) | −23.9 (−11.0) | −10.5 (13.1) | −1.4 (29.5) | 5.8 (42.4) | 0.7 (33.3) | −9.1 (15.6) | −20.2 (−4.4) | −32.8 (−27.0) | −38.0 (−36.4) | −40.7 (−41.3) |
| Average precipitation mm (inches) | 1.8 (0.07) | 1.7 (0.07) | 4.2 (0.17) | 8.4 (0.33) | 20.0 (0.79) | 50.2 (1.98) | 74.5 (2.93) | 54.2 (2.13) | 22.5 (0.89) | 8.8 (0.35) | 5.4 (0.21) | 3.4 (0.13) | 255.1 (10.05) |
| Average precipitation days (≥ 0.1 mm) | 4.3 | 3.2 | 3.6 | 4.3 | 6.5 | 10.9 | 12.2 | 10.3 | 6.6 | 4.1 | 4.9 | 5.7 | 76.6 |
| Average snowy days | 8.7 | 7.3 | 8.1 | 4.7 | 0.7 | 0 | 0 | 0 | 0.4 | 4.5 | 8.5 | 9.8 | 52.7 |
| Average relative humidity (%) | 69 | 65 | 54 | 39 | 39 | 50 | 59 | 59 | 53 | 53 | 62 | 69 | 56 |
| Mean monthly sunshine hours | 201.0 | 219.6 | 267.9 | 273.4 | 290.9 | 275.0 | 278.7 | 286.7 | 261.1 | 234.0 | 195.7 | 182.5 | 2,966.5 |
| Percentage possible sunshine | 71 | 74 | 72 | 67 | 63 | 59 | 59 | 67 | 70 | 70 | 70 | 68 | 68 |
Source 1: China Meteorological Administration
Source 2: Weather China

Climate data for Bayanhushuzhen (Wulagai), elevation 865 m (2,838 ft), (1991–2020 normals)
| Month | Jan | Feb | Mar | Apr | May | Jun | Jul | Aug | Sep | Oct | Nov | Dec | Year |
|---|---|---|---|---|---|---|---|---|---|---|---|---|---|
| Mean daily maximum °C (°F) | −15.1 (4.8) | −9.6 (14.7) | −0.4 (31.3) | 11.1 (52.0) | 19.3 (66.7) | 24.5 (76.1) | 26.8 (80.2) | 25.4 (77.7) | 19.6 (67.3) | 9.8 (49.6) | −2.8 (27.0) | −12.7 (9.1) | 8.0 (46.4) |
| Daily mean °C (°F) | −21.9 (−7.4) | −17.5 (0.5) | −7.9 (17.8) | 3.5 (38.3) | 11.7 (53.1) | 17.7 (63.9) | 20.6 (69.1) | 18.7 (65.7) | 11.7 (53.1) | 1.9 (35.4) | −9.9 (14.2) | −19.1 (−2.4) | 0.8 (33.4) |
| Mean daily minimum °C (°F) | −27.1 (−16.8) | −23.7 (−10.7) | −14.6 (5.7) | −3.7 (25.3) | 3.8 (38.8) | 10.6 (51.1) | 14.6 (58.3) | 12.3 (54.1) | 4.6 (40.3) | −4.5 (23.9) | −15.5 (4.1) | −24.2 (−11.6) | −5.6 (21.9) |
| Average precipitation mm (inches) | 2.3 (0.09) | 2.7 (0.11) | 6.0 (0.24) | 10.6 (0.42) | 28.0 (1.10) | 60.6 (2.39) | 88.6 (3.49) | 67.1 (2.64) | 34.7 (1.37) | 13.1 (0.52) | 6.3 (0.25) | 4.3 (0.17) | 324.3 (12.79) |
| Average precipitation days (≥ 0.1 mm) | 5.5 | 3.8 | 5.2 | 5.7 | 8.1 | 12.6 | 13.9 | 10.7 | 7.9 | 5.6 | 6.4 | 7.1 | 92.5 |
| Average snowy days | 11.3 | 8.9 | 9.7 | 5.9 | 0.9 | 0 | 0 | 0 | 0.3 | 5.6 | 10.7 | 13.5 | 66.8 |
| Average relative humidity (%) | 78 | 75 | 66 | 48 | 47 | 60 | 68 | 67 | 61 | 61 | 71 | 78 | 65 |
| Mean monthly sunshine hours | 212.8 | 231.5 | 279.5 | 279.2 | 297.6 | 274.5 | 275.5 | 281.8 | 259.7 | 240.0 | 202.2 | 189.2 | 3,023.5 |
| Percentage possible sunshine | 75 | 78 | 75 | 68 | 64 | 59 | 59 | 65 | 70 | 72 | 72 | 70 | 69 |
Source: China Meteorological Administration

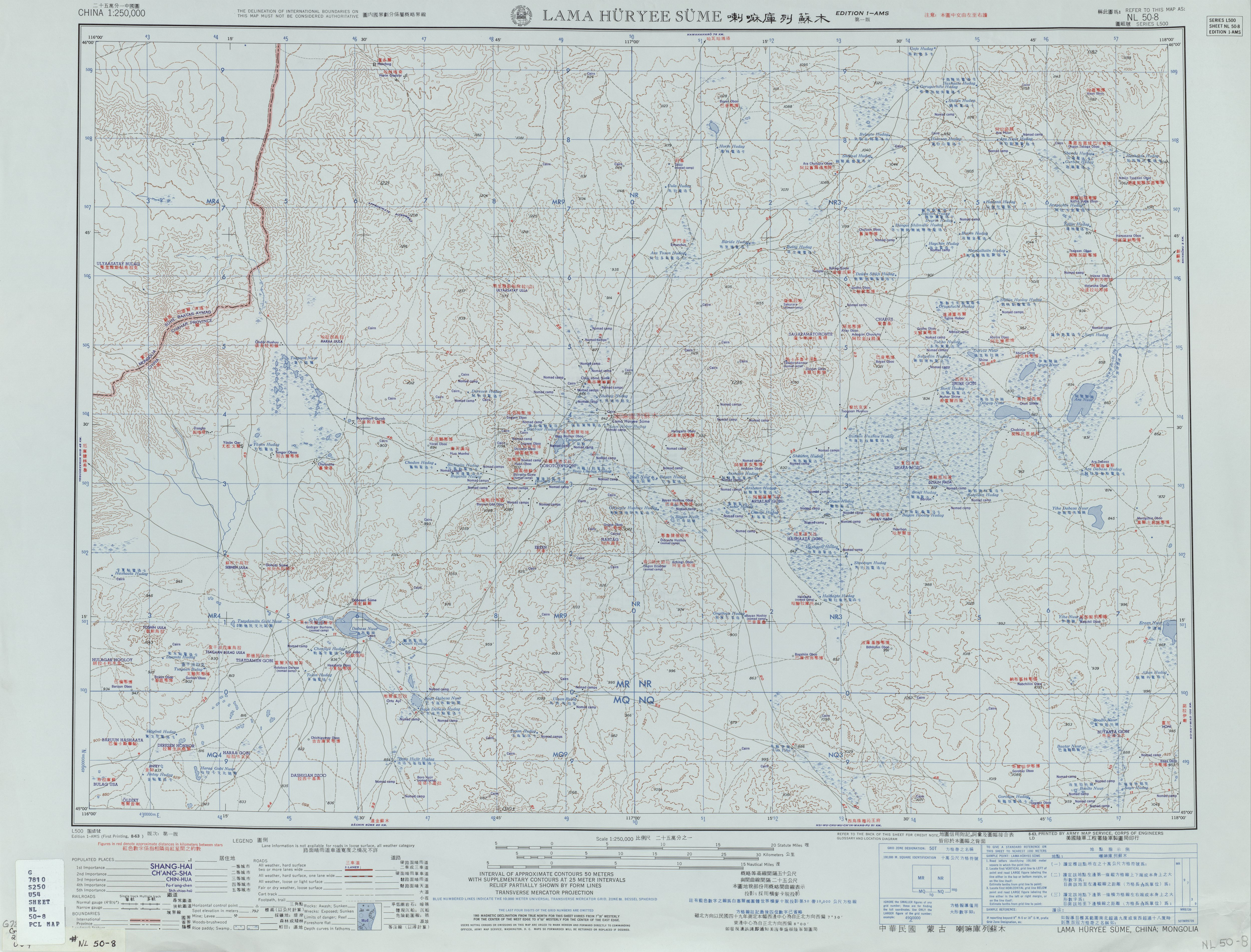
Lama Hüryee Süme (喇嘛庫列蘇木) (1963)

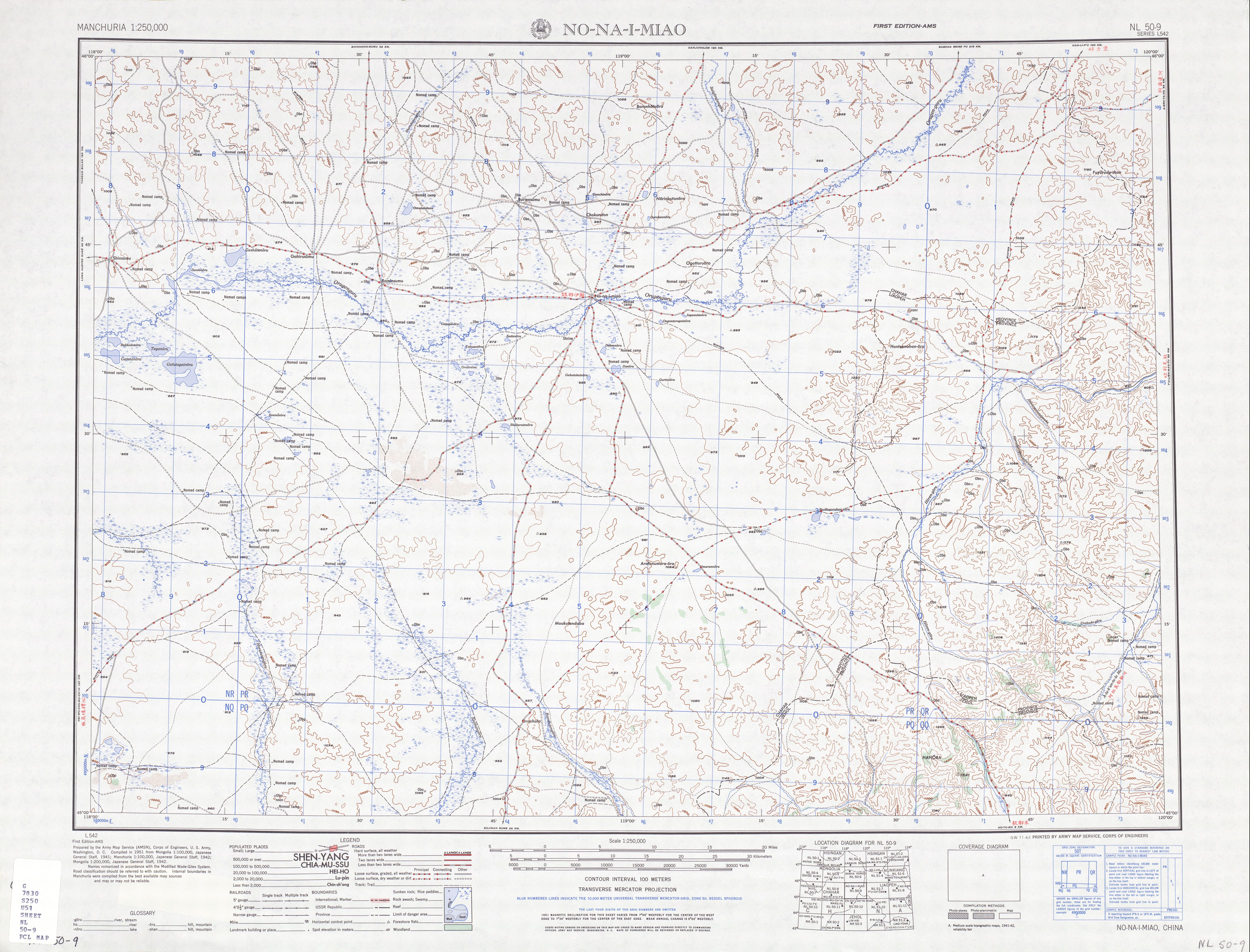
Map including part of modern-day East Ujimqin Banner (AMS, 1951)

== Administrative divisions ==
East Ujimqin Banner is divided into 5 towns and 4 sums:

| Name | Simplified Chinese | Hanyu Pinyin | Mongolian (Hudum Script) | Mongolian (Cyrillic) | Administrative division code |
|---|---|---|---|---|---|
Towns
| Uliastai Town | 乌里雅斯太镇 | Wūlǐyǎsītài Zhèn | ᠤᠯᠢᠶᠠᠰᠤᠲᠠᠢ ᠪᠠᠯᠭᠠᠰᠤ | Улиастай балгас | 152525100 |
| Dut Nur Town | 道特淖尔镇 | Dàotènào'ěr Zhèn | ᠳᠠᠭᠤᠲᠤᠨᠠᠭᠤᠷ ᠪᠠᠯᠭᠠᠰᠤ | Дуутнуур балгас | 152525101 |
| Hatabq Town | 嘎达布其镇 | Gādábùqí Zhèn | ᠬᠠᠲᠠᠪᠴᠢ ᠪᠠᠯᠭᠠᠰᠤ | Хатавч балгас | 152525102 |
| Mandah Bulag Town | 满都胡宝拉格镇 | Mǎndūhúbǎolāgé Zhèn | ᠮᠠᠨᠳᠤᠭᠤᠪᠤᠯᠠᠭ ᠪᠠᠯᠭᠠᠰᠤ | Мандахбулаг балгас | 152525103 |
| Ej Nur Town | 额吉淖尔镇 | Éjínào'ěr Zhèn | ᠡᠵᠢᠨᠠᠭᠤᠷ ᠪᠠᠯᠭᠠᠰᠤ | Ээжнуур балгас | 152525104 |
Sums
| Huret Nur Sum | 呼热图淖尔苏木 | Hūrètúnào'ěr Sūmù | ᠬᠦᠷᠢᠶᠡᠲᠦᠨᠠᠭᠤᠷ ᠰᠤᠮᠤ | Хүрээтнуур сум | 152525200 |
| Samai Sum | 萨麦苏木 | Sàmài Sūmù | ᠰᠠᠮᠠᠢ ᠰᠤᠮᠤ | Самай сум | 152525201 |
| Gahail Sum | 嘎海乐苏木 | Gāhǎilè Sūmù | ᠭᠠᠬᠢᠯ ᠰᠤᠮᠤ | Гахайл сум | 152525202 |
| Altan Hil Sum | 阿拉坦合力苏木 | Ālātǎnhélì Sūmù | ᠠᠯᠲᠠᠨᠬᠢᠯᠢ ᠰᠤᠮᠤ | Алтанхил сум | 152525203 |
Others
| Bogd Ul Head Farm | 宝格达乌拉总场 | Bǎogédáwūlā Zǒngchǎng | ᠪᠣᠭᠯ ᠠᠭᠤᠯᠠ ᠨᠡᠶᠢᠲᠡ ᠲᠠᠯᠠᠪᠠᠢ | Богл уул найд талбай | 152525503 |

In addition, Bayan Huxu Town (巴音胡硕镇) is de jure under jurisdiction of East Ujimqin Banner but de facto administered by Ulgai Management Area (乌拉盖管理区).

Thus Ulgai Management Area consists of 1 county-level town, and 3 ranches and pastures:

| Name | Simplified Chinese | Hanyu Pinyin | Mongolian (Hudum Script) | Mongolian (Cyrillic) | Administrative division code |
|---|---|---|---|---|---|
Towns
| Bayan Huxu Town | 巴音胡硕镇 | Bāyīnhúshuò Zhèn | ᠪᠠᠶᠠᠨᠬᠣᠰᠢᠭᠤ ᠪᠠᠯᠭᠠᠰᠤ | Баянхошуу балгас | 152571101 |
Others
| Halgait Ranch | 哈拉盖图农牧场 | Hālāgàitú Nóngmùchǎng | ᠬᠠᠯᠠᠭᠠᠢᠲᠤ ᠲᠠᠷᠢᠶᠠᠯᠠᠩ ᠮᠠᠯᠵᠢᠯ ᠤᠨ ᠲᠠᠯᠠᠪᠠᠢ | Халгайт тариалан малжлын талбай | 152571500 |
| Heseg Ul Pasture | 贺斯格乌拉牧场 | Hèsīgéwūlā Mùchǎng | ᠬᠡᠰᠡᠭᠠ᠋ᠭᠤᠯᠠ ᠮᠠᠯᠵᠢᠯ ᠤᠨ ᠲᠠᠯᠠᠪᠠᠢ | Хэсгуул малжлын талбай | 152571501 |
| Ulgai Pasture | 乌拉盖牧场 | Wūlāgài Mùchǎng | ᠤᠯᠠᠭᠠᠢ ᠮᠠᠯᠵᠢᠯ ᠤᠨ ᠲᠠᠯᠠᠪᠠᠢ | Улгай малжлын талбай | 152571502 |
