= West Ujimqin Banner =

West Ujimqin Banner 西乌珠穆沁旗 • ᠪᠠᠷᠠᠭᠤᠨ ᠦᠵᠦᠮᠦᠴᠢᠨ ᠬᠣᠰᠢᠭᠤ
- Banner
- Location in Inner Mongolia West Ujimqin (China)
- Coordinates: 44°36′N 117°37′E
- Country: China
- Autonomous region: Inner Mongolia
- League: Xilin Gol
- Banner seat: Balgar Gol

Area
  - Total: 22,380 km^{2} (8,640 sq mi)

Population (2020)
  - Total: 99,255
  - Density: 4.435/km^{2} (11.49/sq mi)
- Time zone: UTC+8 (China Standard)
- Website: www.xwq.gov.cn

West Ujimqin Banner

Chinese name
- Simplified Chinese: 西乌珠穆沁旗
- Traditional Chinese: 西烏珠穆沁旗
Transcriptions
Standard Mandarin
- Hanyu Pinyin: Xī Wūzhūmùqìn Qí

Mongolian name
- Mongolian Cyrillic: Баруун Үзэмчин хошуу
- Mongolian script: ᠪᠠᠷᠠᠭᠤᠨ ᠦᠵᠦᠮᠦᠴᠢᠨ ᠬᠣᠰᠢᠭᠤ
Transcriptions
- SASM/GNC: Baraɣun Ujumučin qosiɣu

West Ujimqin Banner (Mongolian: ᠪᠠᠷᠠᠭᠤᠨ ᠦᠵᠦᠮᠦᠴᠢᠨ ᠬᠣᠰᠢᠭᠤ; Chinese: 西乌珠穆沁旗) is a banner of Inner Mongolia, China. It is under the administration of Xilin Gol League.

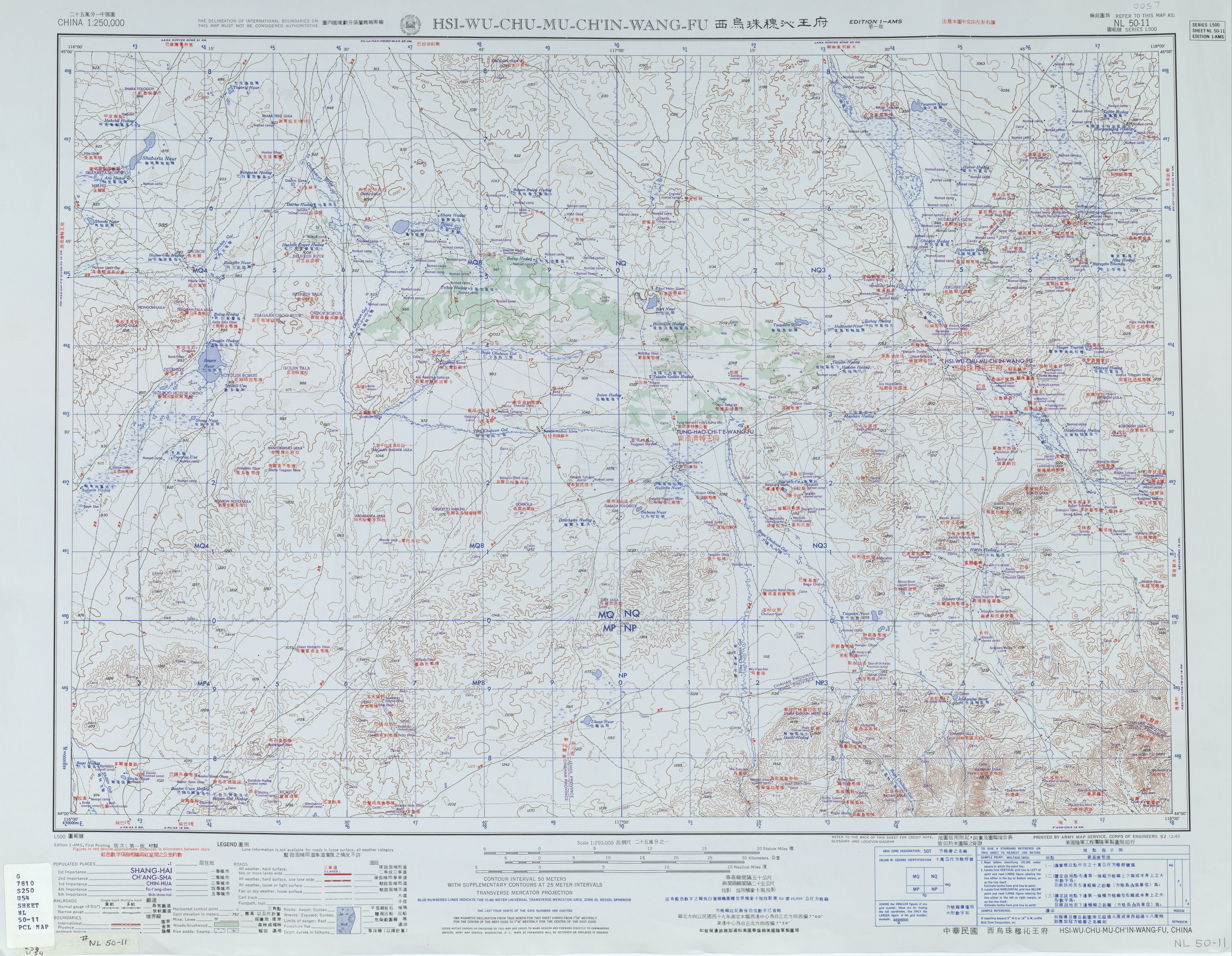
Map including part of modern-day West Ujimqin Banner (AMS, 1963)

== Demographics ==
West Ujimqin Banner has a population of 99,255.

The proportion of nationalities in West Ujimqin Banner (2020)
Nationality	Percentage
Mongols	54.3%
Han	43.5%
Manchus	1.2%
Hui People	0.6%
Daur	0.1%
Miao (Hmong)	0.1%
Dongxiangs	0.1%
Others	0.1%
Source of the population statistics :

== Climate ==
West Ujimqin features a humid continental climate (Köppen Dwb), with bitterly cold and very dry winters, very warm, somewhat humid summers, and strong winds, especially in spring. The monthly 24-hour average temperature ranges from −18.7 °C (−1.7 °F) in January to 20.2 °C (68.4 °F) in July, with the annual mean at 2.05 °C (35.7 °F). The annual precipitation is 325 mm (12.8 in), with more than half of it falling in July and August alone. With monthly percent possible sunshine ranging from 57% in July to 72% in October and February, sunshine is abundant year-round, there are 2,882 hours of bright sunshine annually.

Climate data for West Ujimqin Banner, elevation 1,002 m (3,287 ft), (1991–2020 normals, extremes 1954–present)
Month	Jan	Feb	Mar	Apr	May	Jun	Jul	Aug	Sep	Oct	Nov	Dec	Year
Record high °C (°F)	5.0 (41.0)	10.7 (51.3)	22.2 (72.0)	30.6 (87.1)	33.5 (92.3)	37.3 (99.1)	38.5 (101.3)	38.7 (101.7)	34.2 (93.6)	28.4 (83.1)	18.4 (65.1)	9.4 (48.9)	38.7 (101.7)
Mean daily maximum °C (°F)	−12.3 (9.9)	−7.3 (18.9)	1.4 (34.5)	12.0 (53.6)	19.6 (67.3)	24.4 (75.9)	27.0 (80.6)	25.6 (78.1)	20.0 (68.0)	10.6 (51.1)	−1.1 (30.0)	−10.2 (13.6)	9.1 (48.5)
Daily mean °C (°F)	−18.5 (−1.3)	−14.5 (5.9)	−5.6 (21.9)	4.7 (40.5)	12.4 (54.3)	17.8 (64.0)	20.8 (69.4)	18.8 (65.8)	12.3 (54.1)	3.1 (37.6)	−7.6 (18.3)	−15.9 (3.4)	2.3 (36.2)
Mean daily minimum °C (°F)	−23.9 (−11.0)	−20.5 (−4.9)	−12 (10)	−2.6 (27.3)	4.7 (40.5)	10.7 (51.3)	14.6 (58.3)	12.3 (54.1)	5.3 (41.5)	−3.2 (26.2)	−13.1 (8.4)	−21 (−6)	−4.1 (24.6)
Record low °C (°F)	−40.7 (−41.3)	−37.9 (−36.2)	−35.5 (−31.9)	−22.2 (−8.0)	−9.8 (14.4)	−2.8 (27.0)	4.1 (39.4)	−2.6 (27.3)	−10.3 (13.5)	−24.1 (−11.4)	−35.6 (−32.1)	−36.6 (−33.9)	−40.7 (−41.3)
Average precipitation mm (inches)	2.3 (0.09)	3.4 (0.13)	5.6 (0.22)	10.9 (0.43)	34.4 (1.35)	63.7 (2.51)	94.1 (3.70)	57.2 (2.25)	32.0 (1.26)	16.0 (0.63)	8.6 (0.34)	4.2 (0.17)	332.3 (13.08)
Average precipitation days (≥ 0.1 mm)	5.7	5.8	5.9	5.4	8.0	12.6	13.4	10.6	7.9	6.1	6.3	7.4	95.1
Average snowy days	11.6	10.4	10.3	5.8	1.5	0.1	0	0	0.5	5.6	10.6	13.1	69.5
Average relative humidity (%)	68	65	56	42	43	56	64	64	57	55	62	68	58
Mean monthly sunshine hours	190.4	204.0	246.9	249.6	266.3	257.8	258.5	274.6	246.1	219.8	179.5	168.6	2,762.1
Percentage possible sunshine	66	69	66	61	58	56	55	64	66	66	63	62	63
Source 1: China Meteorological Administration
Source 2: Weather China

== Administrative divisions ==
West Ujimqin Banner is divided into 5 towns and 2 sums.

Name	Simplified Chinese	Hanyu Pinyin	Mongolian (Hudum Script)	Mongolian (Cyrillic)	Administrative division code
Towns
Balgar Gol Town	巴拉嘎尔高勒镇	Bālāgā'ěrgāolè Zhèn	ᠪᠠᠯᠭᠠᠷᠭᠣᠣᠯ ᠪᠠᠯᠭᠠᠰᠤ	Балгаргол балгас	152526100
Bayan Hua Town	巴彦花镇	Bāyànhuā Zhèn	ᠪᠠᠶᠠᠨᠬᠤᠸᠠ ᠪᠠᠯᠭᠠᠰᠤ	Баянхуа балгас	152526101
Jirin Gol Town	吉仁高勒镇	Jíréngāolè Zhèn	ᠵᠢᠷ ᠦᠨ ᠭᠣᠣᠯ ᠪᠠᠯᠭᠠᠰᠤ	Жирийнгол балгас	152526102
Holt Gol Town	浩勒图高勒镇	Hàolètúgāolè Zhèn	ᠬᠣᠭᠣᠯᠲᠤ ᠶᠢᠨ ᠭᠣᠣᠯ ᠪᠠᠯᠭᠠᠰᠤ	Хоолтынгол балгас	152526103
Gorhan Town	高日罕镇	Gāorìhǎn Zhèn	ᠭᠣᠷᠣᠬᠠᠨ ᠪᠠᠯᠭᠠᠰᠤ	Горхрон балгас	152526104
Sums
Bayan Huxu Sum	巴彦胡舒苏木	Bāyànhúshū Sūmù	ᠪᠠᠶᠠᠨᠬᠣᠰᠢᠭᠤ ᠰᠤᠮᠤ	Баянхошуу сум	152526200
Ulan Haalag Sum	乌兰哈拉嘎苏木	Wūlánhālāgā Sūmù	ᠤᠯᠠᠭᠠᠨᠬᠠᠭᠠᠯᠭ᠎ᠠ ᠰᠤᠮᠤ	Улаанхаалга сум	152526201
Others
Bayan Hua Energy and Chemical Industry Park	西乌旗白音华能源化工园区	Xīwūqí Báiyīnhuá Néngyuán Huàgōng Yuánqū	ᠪᠠᠶᠠᠨᠬᠤᠸᠠ ᠡᠨᠧᠷᠭᠢ ᠬᠢᠮᠢ ᠶᠢᠨ ᠠᠵᠤ ᠦᠢᠯᠡᠳᠪᠦᠷᠢ ᠶᠢᠨ ᠲᠣᠭᠣᠷᠢᠭ	Баянхуа энерги химийн аж үйлдвэрийн дугараг	152526400
Forestry Head Farm	林业总场	Línyè Zǒngchǎng	ᠣᠢ ᠶᠢᠨ ᠠᠵᠤ ᠠᠬᠤᠢ ᠶᠢᠨ ᠨᠡᠶᠢᠲᠡ ᠲᠠᠯᠠᠪᠠᠢ	Ойн аж ахуйн найд талбай	152526500
