= Xilinhot =

Xilinhot 锡林浩特市 ᠰᠢᠯᠢ ᠶᠢᠨ ᠬᠣᠲᠠ
- County-level city
- Location in Inner Mongolia Xilinhot (China)
- Coordinates (Xilinhot municipal government): 43°56′00″N 116°05′10″E
- Country: China
- Autonomous region: Inner Mongolia
- League: Xilingol
- Incorporated (County-level city): 10 October 1983
- Municipal seat: Xar Tal Subdistrict

Area
  - County-level city: 14,592.0 km^{2} (5,634.0 sq mi)
  - Urban: 409.00 km^{2} (157.92 sq mi)
- Elevation: 997 m (3,271 ft)

Population (2020)
  - County-level city: 349,953
  - Density: 23.9825/km^{2} (62.1145/sq mi)
  - Urban (2017): 213,000
  - Urban density: 521/km^{2} (1,350/sq mi)
- Time zone: UTC+8 (China Standard)
- Postal code: 026000
- Area code: 0479
- License plate prefixes: 蒙H
- Website: www.xilinhaote.gov.cn

Xilinhot

Chinese name
- Simplified Chinese: 锡林浩特市
- Traditional Chinese: 錫林浩特市
Transcriptions
Standard Mandarin
- Hanyu Pinyin: Xīlínhàotè Shì

Mongolian name
- Mongolian Cyrillic: Шилийн хот
- Mongolian script: ᠰᠢᠯᠢ ᠶᠢᠨ ᠬᠣᠲᠠ
Transcriptions
- SASM/GNC: Shiliin hot

Xilinhot (Mongolian:; Chinese: 锡林浩特市) is a county-level city that serves as the prefectural seat of government for the Xilingol League in Inner Mongolia, China. In 2010, it has a jurisdiction area of 14,785 km^{2} (5,709 sq mi) and a population of 245,886; 149,000 people live in the Xilinhot urban area.

== History ==
During the Ming dynasty, descendants of the elder brother of Genghis Khan lived in Xilinhot area. As a result, the local Mongols were called Abganar, because Abgal in Mongolian means paternal uncle. When in the first half of the 17th century the Mongols submitted to the Manchu, the Abganar territories were divided into two banners: Abganar-Tszoitsi (Abganar left wing) and Abganar-Yuitsi (Abganar right wing). These wings were commanded by men in the rank of princes beile. The Abgal (阿巴嘎) and Hotsit (浩齊特) tribes also lived in the area. Xilinhot was renamed Beizi Temple (貝子廟) after the Qianlong Emperor built the Beizi Temple in 1743. Today, the Beizi temple is one of the largest temples on the Xilin Gol grassland.

In 1914, Beizi Temple was included in the newly founded Chahar Special Administrative Region, which would become the Chahar Province in 1928. Later it was included in the Inner Mongolia Autonomous Region after establishment of People's Republic of China. In 1953, the county was renamed Xilinhot, and then Abahanaer Banner in 1956. In 1983, it was approved for classification as a county-level city by the state council, and once more renamed Xilinhot.

== Geography ==
The elevation of Xilinhot is approximately 990 m (3,250 ft). The city is 610 and 620 km (380 and 390 mi) from Beijing and Hohhot (the capital of Inner Mongolia), respectively.

=== Climate ===
Xilinhot experiences a cold semi-arid climate (Köppen BSk) with long, very dry, and bitter winters and short, hot summers. The monthly 24-hour average temperature ranges from −18.8 °C (−1.8 °F) in January to 21.6 °C (70.9 °F) in July, with an annual mean temperature of 3.04 °C (37.5 °F). With monthly percent possible sunshine ranging from 59 percent in July to 73 percent in February, sunshine is abundant year-round. The city receives 2,970 hours of sunshine per year; due to the aridity, the diurnal temperature variation frequently approaches and exceeds 15 °C (27 °F). Most of the 264 mm (10.4 in) of annual rainfall occurs in July and August.

Climate data for Xilinhot, elevation 1,003 m (3,291 ft), (1991–2020 normals, extremes 1939–present)
Month	Jan	Feb	Mar	Apr	May	Jun	Jul	Aug	Sep	Oct	Nov	Dec	Year
Record high °C (°F)	8.0 (46.4)	14.5 (58.1)	22.4 (72.3)	32.3 (90.1)	36.6 (97.9)	37.4 (99.3)	39.8 (103.6)	39.4 (102.9)	36.1 (97.0)	28.4 (83.1)	19.1 (66.4)	9.3 (48.7)	39.8 (103.6)
Mean daily maximum °C (°F)	−11.8 (10.8)	−6.1 (21.0)	3.3 (37.9)	13.5 (56.3)	21.1 (70.0)	26.0 (78.8)	28.4 (83.1)	27.0 (80.6)	21.4 (70.5)	11.7 (53.1)	0.1 (32.2)	−9.6 (14.7)	10.4 (50.8)
Daily mean °C (°F)	−18.5 (−1.3)	−13.7 (7.3)	−4.2 (24.4)	6.0 (42.8)	13.8 (56.8)	19.2 (66.6)	22.1 (71.8)	20.2 (68.4)	13.8 (56.8)	4.2 (39.6)	−6.7 (19.9)	−15.7 (3.7)	3.4 (38.1)
Mean daily minimum °C (°F)	−23.7 (−10.7)	−19.8 (−3.6)	−10.8 (12.6)	−1.3 (29.7)	6.4 (43.5)	12.6 (54.7)	16.1 (61.0)	13.9 (57.0)	7.0 (44.6)	−2.1 (28.2)	−12.1 (10.2)	−20.8 (−5.4)	−2.9 (26.8)
Record low °C (°F)	−41.1 (−42.0)	−37.2 (−35.0)	−32.8 (−27.0)	−17.7 (0.1)	−8.9 (16.0)	−1.1 (30.0)	6.0 (42.8)	1.0 (33.8)	−7.8 (18.0)	−20.0 (−4.0)	−30.0 (−22.0)	−37.8 (−36.0)	−41.1 (−42.0)
Average precipitation mm (inches)	2.5 (0.10)	2.9 (0.11)	5.1 (0.20)	9.0 (0.35)	27.6 (1.09)	55.3 (2.18)	77.1 (3.04)	52.7 (2.07)	22.5 (0.89)	13.5 (0.53)	7.3 (0.29)	4.5 (0.18)	280 (11.03)
Average precipitation days (≥ 0.1 mm)	4.1	4.4	4.7	4.7	7.3	11.0	12.6	9.2	6.7	4.6	5.6	5.5	80.4
Average snowy days	8.0	7.1	7.4	3.9	0.9	0.1	0.0	0.0	0.4	3.5	7.5	9.3	48.1
Average relative humidity (%)	70	65	52	38	39	50	58	57	51	53	61	69	55
Mean monthly sunshine hours	205.5	215.6	264.0	267.5	289.9	278.3	280.6	285.4	260.8	233.8	195.8	187.5	2,964.7
Percentage possible sunshine	71	72	71	66	63	60	61	67	71	70	69	68	67
Source: China Meteorological Administration all-time extreme temperature

== Administrative divisions ==
Xilinhot is further divided into 8 subdistricts, 1 town, and 3 sums.

Name	Simplified Chinese	Hanyu Pinyin	Mongolian (Hudum Script)	Mongolian (Cyrillic)	Administrative division code
Subdistricts
Xar Tal Subdistrict	希日塔拉街道	Xīrìtǎlā Jiēdào	ᠰᠢᠷᠠᠲᠠᠯ᠎ᠠ ᠵᠡᠭᠡᠯᠢ ᠭᠤᠳᠤᠮᠵᠢ	Шартал зээл гудамж	152502001
Bulgan Subdistrict	宝力根街道	Bǎolìgēn Jiēdào	ᠪᠤᠯᠠᠭᠠᠨ ᠵᠡᠭᠡᠯᠢ ᠭᠤᠳᠤᠮᠵᠢ	Булган зээл гудамж	152502002
Hanggai Subdistrict	杭盖街道	Hánggài Jiēdào	ᠬᠠᠩᠭᠠᠢ ᠵᠡᠭᠡᠯᠢ ᠭᠤᠳᠤᠮᠵᠢ	Хангай зээл гудамж	152502003
Qulgan Subdistrict	楚古兰街道	Chǔgǔlán Jiēdào	ᠴᠢᠭᠤᠯᠭᠠᠨ ᠵᠡᠭᠡᠯᠢ ᠭᠤᠳᠤᠮᠵᠢ	Чуулган зээл гудамж	152502004
Erden Subdistrict	额尔敦街道	É'ěrdūn Jiēdào	ᠡᠷᠳᠡᠨᠢ ᠵᠡᠭᠡᠯᠢ ᠭᠤᠳᠤᠮᠵᠢ	Эрдэн зээл гудамж	152502005
Nanjiao Subdistrict	南郊街道	Nánjiāo Jiēdào	ᠡᠮᠦᠨ᠎ᠡ ᠲᠡᠭᠦᠷᠭᠡ ᠶᠢᠨ ᠵᠡᠭᠡᠯᠢ ᠭᠤᠳᠤᠮᠵᠢ	Өмнө дүүрээгийн зээл гудамж	152502006
Bayan Qagan Subdistrict	巴彦查干街道	Bāyànchágān Jiēdào	ᠪᠠᠶᠠᠨᠴᠠᠭᠠᠨ ᠵᠡᠭᠡᠯᠢ ᠭᠤᠳᠤᠮᠵᠢ	Баянцагаан зээл гудамж	152502007
Bayan Xil Subdistrict	巴彦锡勒街道	Bāyànxīlè Jiēdào	ᠪᠠᠶᠠᠨᠰᠢᠯᠢ ᠵᠡᠭᠡᠯᠢ ᠭᠤᠳᠤᠮᠵᠢ	Баяншл зээл гудамж	152502008
Town
Arxan Bulag Town	阿尔善宝拉格镇	Ā'ěrshànbǎolāgé Zhèn	ᠷᠠᠰᠢᠶᠠᠨᠪᠤᠯᠠᠭ ᠪᠠᠯᠭᠠᠰᠤ	Рашаанбулаг балгас	152502100
Sums
Bulgan Sum	宝力根苏木	Bǎolìgēn Sūmù	ᠪᠤᠯᠠᠭᠠᠨ ᠰᠤᠮᠤ	Булган сум	152502200
Qog Ul Sum	朝克乌拉苏木	Cháokèwūlā Sūmù	ᠴᠣᠭᠠ᠋ᠭᠤᠯᠠ ᠰᠤᠮᠤ	Цугуул сум	152502201
Bayan Bulag Sum	巴彦宝拉格苏木	Bāyànbǎolāgé Sūmù	ᠪᠠᠶᠠᠨᠪᠤᠯᠠᠭ ᠰᠤᠮᠤ	Баянбулаг сум	152502202

Others:

- Xilin Gol Economic-Technological Development Area (锡林郭勒盟经济技术开发区)
- Bayan Hure Ranch (白银库伦牧场)
- Bileg Ranch (贝力克牧场)
- Modon Ranch (毛登牧场)

== Economy ==
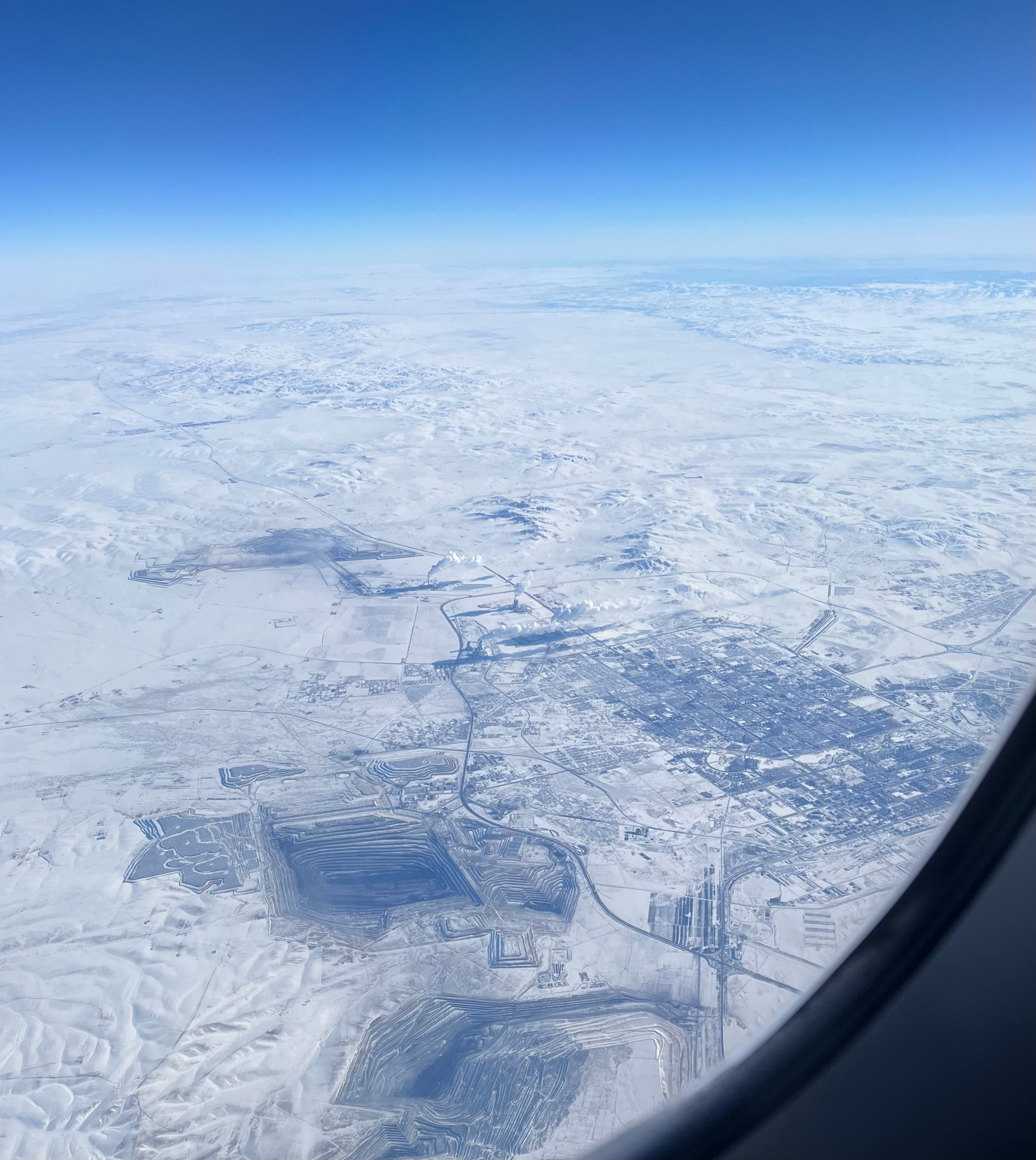
surface mining in Xilinhot

The market of the area is centered in Xilinhot and cattle is of particular importance. The rural area of Xilinhot consists of surface mining pits for coal.

== Culture and tourism ==
The historic center of Xilinhot contains an artistic temple.

The Naadam festival, a Mongolian feast, is celebrated every year. Naadam is a gathering of the Mongolian people that involves wrestling, horse trading, costume contests, horse racing, etc. It's the Mongolian summer festival with festival attendees wearing colorful costumes. Colorful yurts are set up to serve food and trinkets and supplies.

Mongolian culture is prevalent in the city scene; tapestries and monumental statues of Genghis Khan adorn homes, shops, and street corners.

Tourists can stay at nearby yurt resorts, where there are large yurts for dining surrounded by smaller individual yurts for sleeping. The Xilinhot countryside is marked by rolling grasslands populated by Mongolians who keep horses, sheep, goats, and cows. Mongolian meals consist of mutton, beef, cabbage, and other fruits and vegetables.

== Cuisine ==
The diet of the area is centered around the local dairy and meat production. Products regularly eaten by residents include horse milk yogurt, milk, tofu, milk skin, beef and mutton string, hand meat, and grilled whole lamb (烤全羊).

== Transportation ==
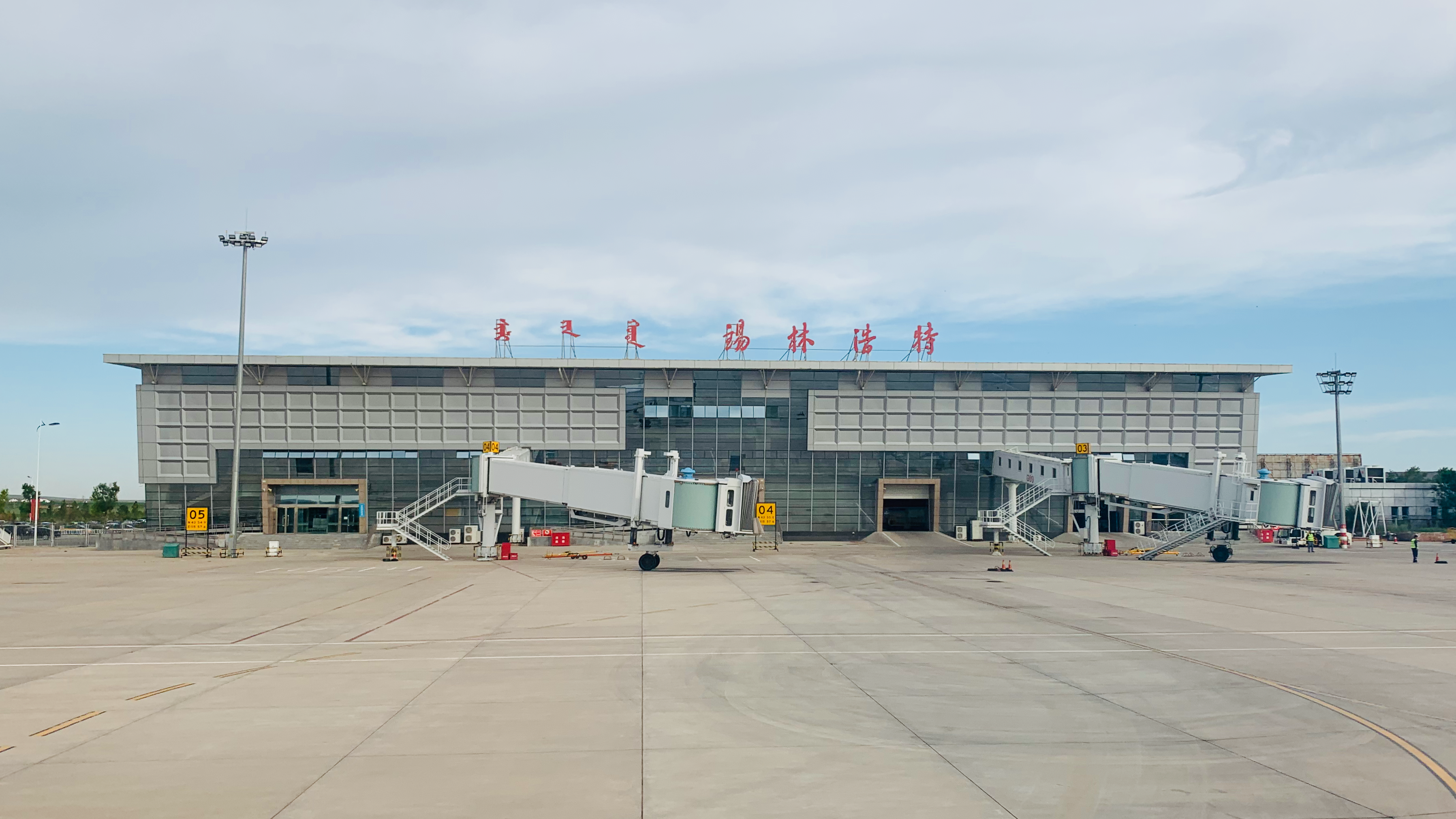
Xilinhot Airport

Xilinhot Airport has regular flights to Beijing on Air China and China United Airlines. The airport is also served by Tianjin Airlines with multiple daily flights to Hohhot and a seasonal daily flight to Tianjin; there are also occasional direct flights to other major cities.

The K7917 train connects Xilinhot with the national rail network and departs daily for Hohhot and Baotou.

China National Highway 207 and China National Highway 303 both terminate in the Xilinhot area. The S27 Xilingol-Kalgan Expressway also ends in a suburb of Xilinhot.
