= Shangdu =

Summer capital of Yuan dynasty

- 上都 (Chinese)
- Interactive map of Shangdu
- 42.35802°N 116.18516°E
- Type: City
- Location: Zhenglan Banner, Inner Mongolia, China

History
- Built: 1250s
- Abandoned: 1369

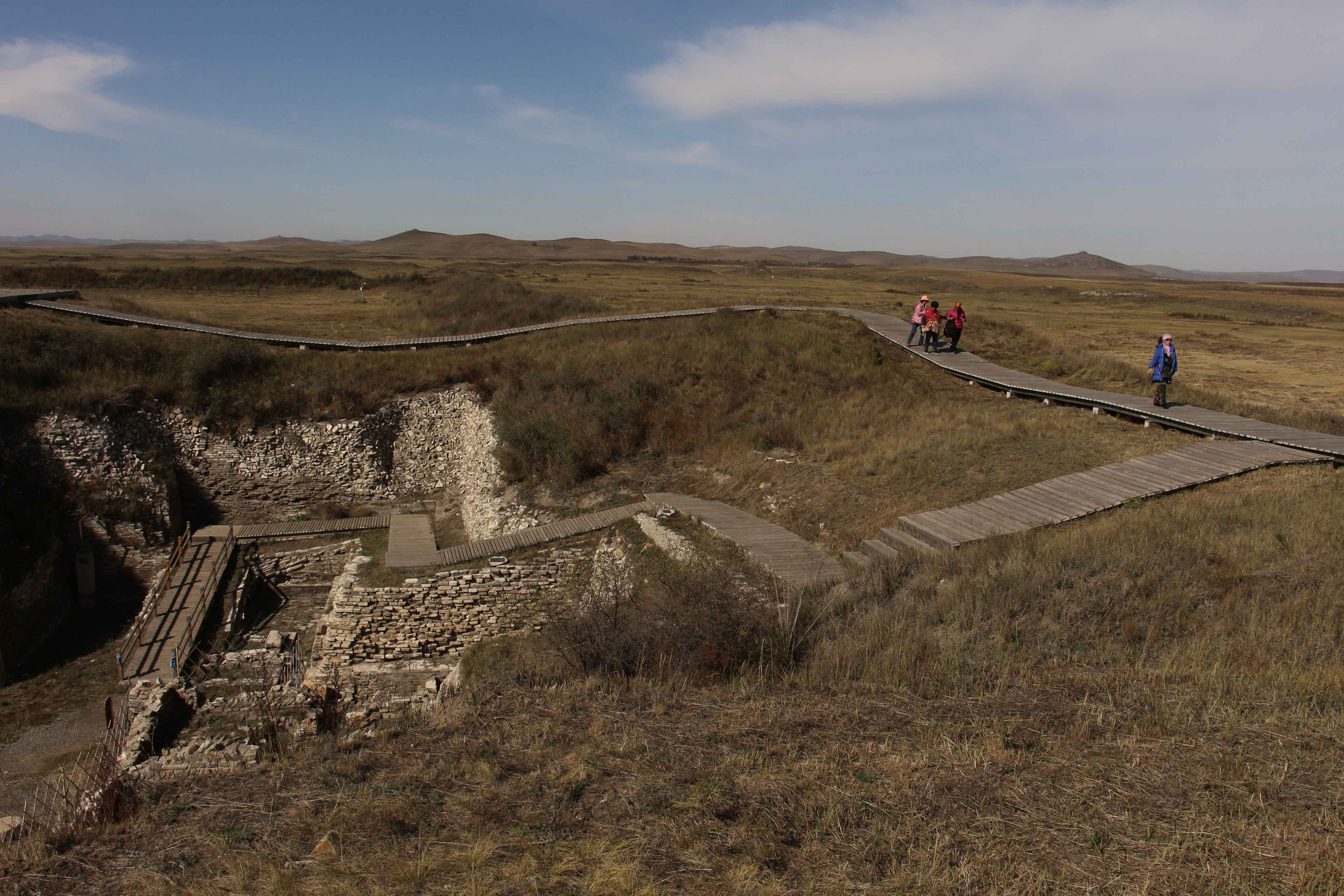
Ruins of Shangdu

Shangdu (Chinese: 上都; pinyin: Shàngdū; lit. 'Upper Capital'; Mongolian: Шанду), known in the West as Xanadu (/ˈzænəduː/ ZAN-ə-doo), was the summer capital of the Yuan dynasty. Located in what is now Zhenglan Banner, Inner Mongolia, it was designed by Chinese architect Liu Bingzhong and served as a seasonal retreat blending Mongolian steppe traditions with Chinese urban planning. The site gained legendary status after it was visited by Marco Polo and later inspired the English poet Samuel Taylor Coleridge.

In 2012, it was designated a UNESCO World Heritage Site for its cultural and historical significance. A railway is under construction from Beijing to Zhenglan Banner and will open in 2026.

== History ==
Shangdu, originally named Kaiping (開平), was established between 1252 and 1256 by Liu Bingzhong, a trusted advisor to Kublai Khan and a former Buddhist monk. Liu implemented a "profoundly Chinese scheme for the city's architecture", blending Confucian city planning with Mongolian steppe traditions. In 1264, Kublai Khan renamed the city Shangdu and established it as the summer capital of the Yuan dynasty.

Located in the grasslands north of the Great Wall—about 350 km north of Beijing and 28 km northwest of present-day Duolun County—Shangdu was designed with a triple structure: an outer city, an inner city, and a central imperial palace. The palace enclosure measured roughly 550 meters per side, corresponding to about 40% of the later Forbidden City in Beijing.

Shangdu served both as a summer retreat and as a political and ceremonial center, where Kublai Khan hosted foreign envoys and conducted court affairs. It embodied the synthesis of Mongol governance and Chinese administration, and it symbolized the cosmopolitan character of the Yuan dynasty.

At its height, Shangdu had a population of over 100,000 and included gardens, hunting grounds, temples, and administrative quarters. Descriptions from Marco Polo and archaeological findings indicate the palace featured marble halls, gilded decoration, and elaborate wood and lacquer work.

In 1369, during the fall of the Yuan dynasty, Shangdu was sacked by Ming forces and largely destroyed. The court fled north and the city was abandoned. The site's original name, Kaiping, was briefly restored, but the settlement never recovered.

In 1872, British diplomat Steven Bushell visited the ruins and noted surviving remnants of temples, marble blocks, and decorative tiles. However, by the late 20th century, many of these materials had been scavenged by local residents of Dolon Nor for building use. Since 2002, the Chinese government has undertaken efforts to preserve and study the site, which was designated a UNESCO World Heritage Site in 2012.

== Literary and historical descriptions ==
=== Marco Polo ===
Marco Polo visited Shangdu around 1275. He described a marble palace with gilt rooms and an expansive park:

There is at this place a very fine marble palace, the rooms of which are all gilt and painted with figures ... Round this Palace a wall is built ... inside the Park there are fountains and rivers ...

He also recounted a portable "cane palace", adorned with lacquered dragons and able to be dismantled for travel:

The whole Palace is built of these canes ... it can all be taken to pieces and removed whithersoever the Emperor may command.

=== Toghon Temür ===
After the loss of Shangdu and Daidu in 1368, the last Yuan emperor composed a lament, excerpted from the Altan Tobchi:

My Yellow Steppe of Xanadu, the summer residence of ancient Khans ... Jewel Daidu was built with many an adornment ... I have lost it all – to China.

=== Samuel Purchas ===
In 1614, English clergyman Samuel Purchas described "Xandu" as a pleasure palace with a vast park and a cane palace:

In Xandu did Kublai Khan build a stately Pallace ... in the middest thereof a sumptuous house of pleasure, which may be moved from place to place.

His 1625 edition expanded the detail, echoing Marco Polo's account:

In this enclosure ... are goodly meadows, springs, rivers ... In the middest in a faire wood he hath a royall House on pillars gilded and varnished ...

=== Samuel Taylor Coleridge ===
Inspired by Purchas's account, Coleridge dreamt of Xanadu while under the influence of opium and began writing the poem Kubla Khan (1797):

In Xanadu did Kubla Khan
A stately pleasure-dome decree:
Where Alph, the sacred river, ran
Through caverns measureless to man
Down to a sunless sea.

== Astronomy ==
In 2006, the International Astronomical Union named a region on Saturn's moon Titan "Xanadu". Its radar-imaged landscape resembles Earth, with rivers and mountains—but composed of methane and ice rather than water and rock.

== In popular culture ==
- Xanadu is the name of the mansion in the 1941 film Citizen Kane.
- Referenced in the Rush song "Xanadu".
- Title of a 1980 film starring Olivia Newton-John.
- Part of the quote by Coleridge about Xanadu's "pleasure-dome" is adapted into the 1985 song "Welcome to the Pleasuredome" by Frankie Goes to Hollywood.
- In Xanadu, a 1989 travel book by William Dalrymple.
- Xana/X.A.N.A./Xanadu, a virus in Code Lyoko.
- Yamaxanadu (ヤマザナドゥ), or "Yama of Xanadu" (different meaning but same Western spelling), is the title of Touhou Project character Eiki Shiki (四季映姫, Shiki Eiki), who debuts in the franchise as the final boss of the ninth official installment, 2005 bullet hell shooter Touhou Kaeizuka ~ Phantasmagoria of Flower View (東方花映塚 〜 Phantasmagoria of Flower View; lit. "Oriental Flower Viewing Mound").
- Shangdu/Xanadu referenced in episode 3 of the 2024 Netflix limited series 3 Body Problem (TV series).
- The second game in the DragonSlayer series of video games is subtitled "Xanadu" and would branch off into its own series of games
