= Xilingol League =

Coordinates: 43.93°N 116.09°E

Xilingol League 锡林郭勒盟 • ᠰᠢᠯᠢ ᠶᠢᠨ ᠭᠣᠣᠯ ᠠᠢᠮᠠᠭ
- League
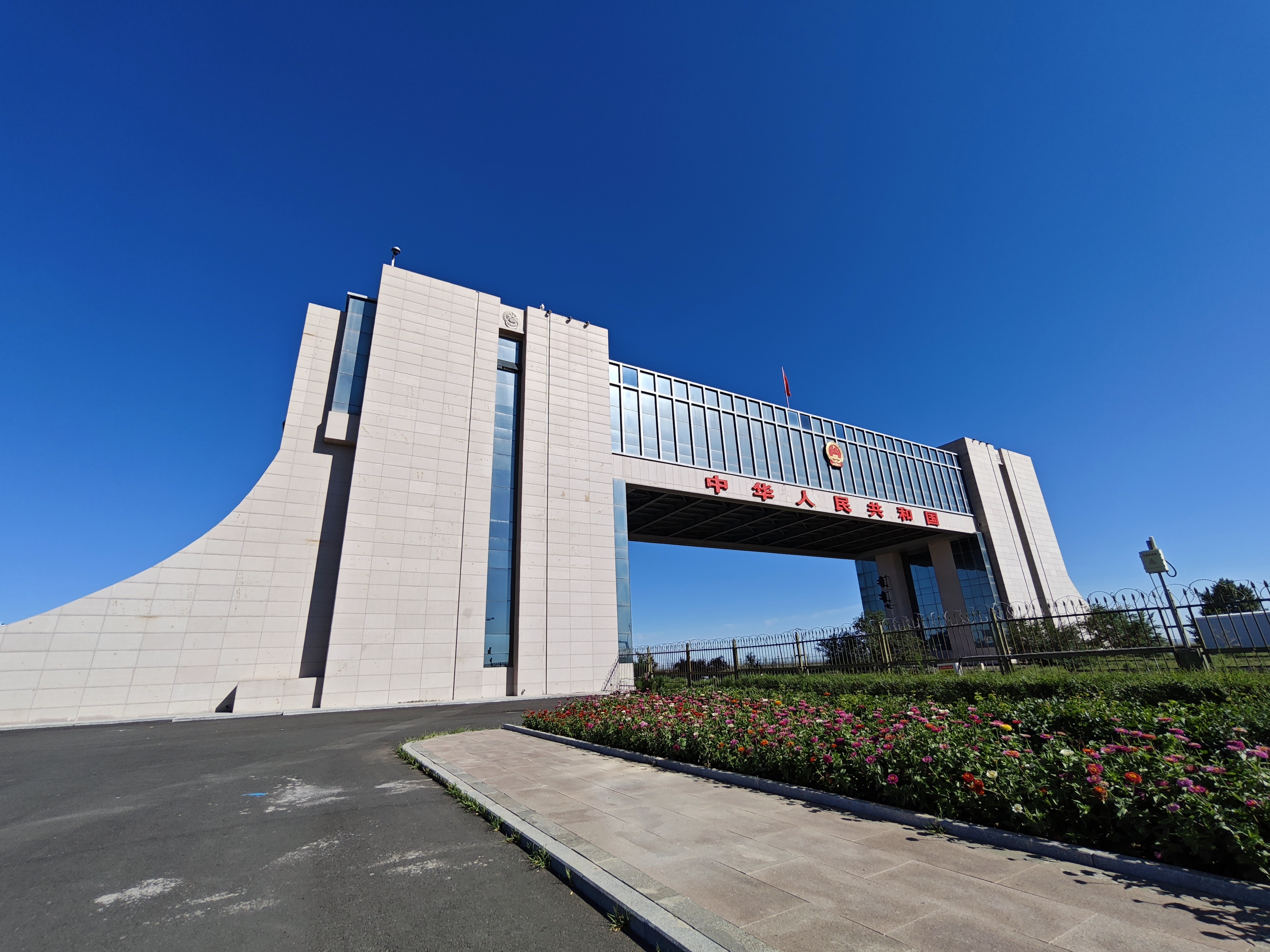
- Erenhot

- Location of Xilingol League in Inner Mongolia
- Country: People's Republic of China
- Region: Inner Mongolia

Area
  - Total: 211,866 km^{2} (81,802 sq mi)

Population (2010)
  - Total: 1,028,022
  - Density: 4.85223/km^{2} (12.5672/sq mi)

GDP
  - Total: CN¥ 100.0 billion US$ 16.1 billion
  - Per capita: CN¥ 96,025; US$ 15,417
- Time zone: UTC+8 (China Standard)
- Postal code: 152500
- Area code: 0479
- ISO 3166 code: CN-NM-25
- Licence plate prefixes: 蒙H
- Website: www.xlgl.gov.cn

Xilingol League

Chinese name
- Traditional Chinese: 錫林郭勒
- Simplified Chinese: 锡林郭勒
Transcriptions
Standard Mandarin
- Hanyu Pinyin: Xílínguōlè

Mongolian name
- Mongolian Cyrillic: Шилийн Гол аймаг
- Mongolian script: ᠰᠢᠯᠢ ᠶᠢᠨ ᠭᠣᠣᠯ ᠠᠶᠢᠮᠠᠭ
Transcriptions
- SASM/GNC: Sili-yin Ɣool ayimaɣ

Xilingol League (also transliterated as Xilin Gol or Shiliin Gol; Chinese: 锡林郭勒盟; Mongolian: , Шилийн Гол аймаг, Shiliin Gol aimag, pronounced [ʃɪ̆ˈliŋ ɢɔl ˈɛːmə̆k]) is one of the three leagues of Inner Mongolia. The seat is Xilinhot, and the area is 202,580 km^{2} (78,220 sq mi). The league's economy is based on mining and agriculture.

Xilingol borders Mongolia to the north, Chifeng, Tongliao and Hinggan League to the east, Ulanqab to the west and Hebei to the south.

This is the only prefecture-level division of Inner Mongolia in whose southern border nomadic culture is still vivid. Some divisions, such as Tongliao, have a much higher percentage of Mongolian population, but agriculture is extensive among Khorchin Mongols there. Xilingol League is also the closest Inner Mongolian prefecture-level division to Beijing; although, among those Inner Mongolian prefecture-level divisions bordering Hebei, the province surrounding Beijing, Xilin Gol is also the most unapproachable one. With a significant population of Chakhar Mongols, who speak a Mongolian dialect closely related to the standard dialect of Mongolia, the dialect also spoken in Xulun Hoh Banner, Xilin Gol League's variety is chosen as the standard language of Mongolian in China. Nevertheless, the de facto common standard is a mix of Khorchin-Kharchin and Chakhar, due to the extensive presence of Khorchin Mongolian speakers in China.

== Demographics ==
In 2000, there were 975,168 inhabitants:

Ethnic group	no. of inhabitants	share
Han	653,226	66.78%
Mongols	284,995	29.23%
Manchu	26,687	2.74%
Hui	11,009	1.13%
Daur	784	0.08%
Other	519	0.04%

== Administrative subdivisions ==
Xilin Gol is divided into two county-level cities, one county and nine banners:

Map
Name	Mongolian	Hanzi	Hanyu Pinyin	Population (2010)	Area (km^{2})	Density (/km^{2})
Xilinhot (city)	ᠰᠢᠯᠢ ᠶᠢᠨ ᠬᠣᠲᠠ (Sili-yin qota)	锡林浩特市	Xīlínhàotè Shì	245,886	15,758	15.6
Erenhot (city)	ᠡᠷᠢᠶᠡᠨ ᠬᠣᠲᠠ (Eriyen qota)	二连浩特市	Èrliánhàotè Shì	74,197	4,015	18.5
Duolun County	ᠳᠣᠯᠣᠨᠨᠤᠤᠷ ᠰᠢᠶᠠᠨ (Dolonnuur siyan)	多伦县	Duōlún Xiàn	100,893	3,773	26.7
Abag Banner	ᠠᠪᠠᠭ᠎ᠠ ᠬᠣᠰᠢᠭᠤ (Abaɣ-a qosiɣu)	阿巴嘎旗	Ābāgā Qí	43,574	27,495	1.6
Sonid Left Banner (Sonid Jun Banner)	ᠰᠥᠨᠡᠳ ᠵᠡᠭᠦᠨ ᠬᠣᠰᠢᠭᠤ (Söned Jegün qosiɣu)	苏尼特左旗	Sūnítè Zuǒ Qí	33,652	33,469	1.0
Sonid Right Banner (Sonid Barun Banner)	ᠰᠥᠨᠡᠳ ᠪᠠᠷᠠᠭᠤᠨ ᠬᠣᠰᠢᠭᠤ (Söned Baraɣun qosiɣu)	苏尼特右旗	Sūnítè Yòu Qí	71,063	26,700	2.7
East Ujimqin Banner (Jun Ujimqin Banner)	ᠵᠡᠭᠦᠨ ᠤᠵᠤᠮᠤᠴᠢᠨ ᠬᠣᠰᠢᠭᠤ (Jegün Ujumučin qosiɣu)	东乌珠穆沁旗	Dōng Wūzhūmùqìn Qí	93,962	47,554	2.0
West Ujimqin Banner (Barun Ujimqin Banner)	ᠪᠠᠷᠠᠭᠤᠨ ᠤᠵᠤᠮᠤᠴᠢᠨ ᠬᠣᠰᠢᠭᠤ (Baraɣun Ujumučin qosiɣu)	西乌珠穆沁旗	Xī Wūzhūmùqìn Qí	87,614	22,960	3.8
Taibus Banner	ᠲᠠᠶᠢᠫᠤᠰᠧ ᠬᠣᠰᠢᠭᠤ (Tayipusė qosiɣu)	太仆寺旗	Tàipúsì Qí	112,339	3,415	32.9
Bordered Yellow Banner (Xianghuang Banner) (Hobot Xar Banner)	ᠬᠥᠪᠡᠭᠡᠲᠦ ᠰᠢᠷ᠎ᠠ ᠬᠣᠰᠢᠭᠤ (Köbegetü Sir-a qosiɣu)	镶黄旗	Xiānghuáng Qí	28,450	4,960	5.7
Plain and Bordered White Banner (Zhengxiangbai Banner) (Xulun Hobot Qagan Banner)	ᠰᠢᠯᠤᠭᠤᠨ ᠬᠥᠪᠡᠭᠡᠲᠦ ᠴᠠᠭᠠᠨ ᠬᠣᠰᠢᠭᠤ (Siluɣun Köbegetü Čaɣan qosiɣu)	正镶白旗	Zhèngxiāngbái Qí	54,443	6,083	9.0
Plain Blue Banner (Zhenglan Banner) (Xulun Hoh Banner)	ᠰᠢᠯᠤᠭᠤᠨ ᠬᠥᠬᠡ ᠬᠣᠰᠢᠭᠤ (Siluɣun Köke qosiɣu)	正蓝旗	Zhènglán Qí	81,967	9,963	8.2

== Demonstrations in 2011 ==
After the alleged murder of a Mongolian herder, Mergen, by a Chinese truck driver who was blocking the way for Chinese coal trucks to pass through his pasture on May 10, 2011, protests with some thousand protestors broke out in Xilingol. To prevent the spreading of protests, the Chinese government sealed off the Inner Mongolia University for Nationalities in Tongliao and the Nationalities University in Hohhot, the only two universities where lessons are predominantly taught in Mongolian. In addition, it enforced tight control on the internet and shut down QQ chatrooms. To address the underlying issues, the government provided compensation to the family of the victim, brought forth tougher environmental regulations, and dismissed the Communist Party chief of West Ujimqin. The truck driver was tried, found guilty of murder, and sentenced to death.
