= Banners of Inner Mongolia =

County-level subdivision in Inner Mongolia, China

Banner
Manchu:	Gūsa (romanized)
Classical Mongolian: ᠬᠣᠰᠢᠭᠤ ᠪᠣᠱᠤᠬᠤ	qosiγu bošuγu hôxûû bôxig (romanized)
Chinese:	旗 (character) qí (Pinyin romanization)
Cyrillic Mongolian:	Хошуу (cyrillized) khoshuu (romanized)
Mongolian script:	ᠬᠣᠰᠢᠭᠤ Hôxûû or Hûxûû

A banner (Chinese: 旗; pinyin: qí; Mongolian: хошуу khoshuu) is an administrative division of the Inner Mongolia Autonomous Region in China, equivalent to a county-level administrative division.

Banners were first used during the Qing dynasty, which organized the Mongols into banners, except those who belonged to the Eight Banners. Each banner had sums as nominal subdivisions. In Inner Mongolia, several banners made up a league. In the rest, including Outer Mongolia, northern Xinjiang, and Qinghai, Aimag (Аймаг) was the largest administrative division. While it restricted the Mongols from crossing banner borders, the dynasty protected Mongolia from population pressure from China proper. After the Mongolian People's Revolution, the banners of Outer Mongolia were abolished in 1923.

There were 49 banners and 24 tribes in Inner Mongolia during the Republic of China.

Today, banners are a county-level division in the Chinese administrative hierarchy. There are 52 in total, including 3 autonomous banners.

== Banners ==
The following list of 49 individual banners is sorted alphabetically according to each specific title (i.e., ignoring adjectives such as New, Old, Left, Right, etc.)

- Abag Banner; League: Xilingol
- Alxa Right Banner; League: Alxa
- Alxa Left Banner; League: Alxa
- Aohan Banner
- Ar Horqin Banner
- Arun Banner
- Bairin Left Banner
- Bairin Right Banner
- Old Barag Banner
- New Barag Left Banner
- New Barag Right Banner
- Chahar Right Middle Banner
- Chahar Right Front Banner
- Chahar Right Rear Banner
- Dalad Banner
- Darhan Muminggan United Banner
- Ejin Banner; League: Alxa
- Ejin Horo Banner
- Hanggin Banner
- Hanggin Rear Banner
- Harqin Banner
- Hexigten Banner
- Horqin Left Rear Banner
- Horqin Left Middle Banner
- Horqin Right Front Banner; League: Hinggan
- Horqin Right Middle Banner; League: Hinggan
- Hure Banner
- Jalaid Banner; League: Hinggan
- Jarud Banner
- Jungar Banner
- Muminggan Banner -> Darhan Muminggan United Banner
- Naiman Banner
- Ongniud Banner
- Otog Banner
- Otog Front Banner
- Siziwang Banner
- Sonid Left Banner; League: Xilingol
- Sonid Right Banner; League: Xilingol
- Taibus Banner; League: Xilingol
- Tumed Left Banner
- Tumed Right Banner
- East Ujimqin Banner; League: Xilingol
- West Ujimqin Banner; League: Xilingol
- Urad Rear Banner
- Urad Middle Banner
- Urad Front Banner
- Uxin Banner
- Xianghuang Banner; League: Xilingol
- Zhenglan Banner; League: Xilingol
- Zhengxiangbai Banner; League: Xilingol

== Autonomous banners ==
An autonomous banner (Chinese: 自治旗; pinyin: zìzhìqí) is a special type of banner set up by the government of China. There are three autonomous banners, all of which are found in northeastern Inner Mongolia, each with a designated ethnic majority other than Han or Mongol that is a national ethnic minority:

- Oroqen Autonomous Banner (鄂伦春自治旗) for the Oroqen
- Evenki Autonomous Banner (鄂温克族自治旗) for the Evenks
- Morin Dawa Daur Autonomous Banner (莫力达瓦达斡尔族自治旗) for the Daur

== Banner-converted cities/counties ==
- Dorbod Mongol Autonomous County (Dorbod Banner)
- Ergun (Ergun Right Banner)
- Genhe (Ergun Left Banner)
- Harqin Left Wing Mongol Autonomous County (Harqin Left Banner)
- Front Gorlos Mongol Autonomous County (Front Gorlos Banner)
- Xilinhot (Abahanar Banner)
- Yakeshi (Xuguit Banner)
- Zhalantun (Butha Banner)
- Zhaoyuan County (Rear Gorlos Banner)

== See also ==
- Eight Banners (banner system of the Manchus)
