= Administrative division codes of China =

The administrative division codes of the People's Republic of China identify the administrative divisions of China at county level and above. They are published by the National Bureau of Statistics of China with the latest version issued on September 30, 2015.

== Coding scheme ==
Reading from left to right, administrative division codes contain the following information:

- The first and second digits identify the highest level administrative division, which may be a province, autonomous region, municipality or Special Administrative Region (SAR).
- Digits three and four show summary data for the associated prefecture-level city, prefecture (地区 dìqū), autonomous prefecture, Mongolian league, municipal city district or county. Codes 01 – 20 and 51 – 70 identify provincial level cities, codes 21 – 50 represent prefectures, autonomous prefectures and Mongolian leagues.
- The fifth and sixth digits represent the county-level division – city district, county-level city, county and the banner area of Inner Mongolia. Codes 01 – 18 represent municipal districts or regions (autonomous prefectures and Mongolian leagues) under the jurisdiction of county-level cities. Codes 21 – 80 stand for counties and Mongolian banner areas while codes 81 – 99 represent county level cities directly administered by a province.

== Division codes for statistical use ==
Division codes for statistical use consist of the administrative division codes and an additional 6 digits, identifying the administrative divisions of China at the village level and above.

For example, in the code 110102 007 003, 110102 refers to Xicheng District, Beijing, 007 refers to Yuetan Subdistrict and 003 refers to Yuetan Community.

== See also ==
- Administrative divisions of China
- ISO 3166-2:CN
- OKATO, a somewhat similar numeric code system used in Russia
