= League (China) =

Regional division used in Inner Mongolia

League ᠠᠢᠮᠠᠭ or 盟 ayimaγ or méng
- Category: Second level administrative division of a unitary state
- Location: China
- Number: 3 Leagues

A league (Mongolian: ayimaγ [æːmɑ̆ɡ̊] Aimag; historically, čiγulγan [t͡ʃʰʊːlɡ̊ɑ̆n] Qûûlgan; Chinese: 盟; pinyin: méng) is a prefecture-level administrative unit of the autonomous region of Inner Mongolia in the People's Republic of China.

Leagues are the prefectures of Inner Mongolia. The name comes from a Mongolian administrative unit used during the Qing dynasty in Mongolia. Mongolian banners (county-level regions) were organized into conventional assemblies at the league level. During the Republic of China era, the leagues had a status equivalent to provinces. Leagues contain banners, equivalent to counties.

After the establishment of the provincial level Inner Mongolia Autonomous Region in 1947, leagues of Inner Mongolia became equal to prefectures in other provinces and autonomous regions. The administrative commission (Chinese: 行政公署; pinyin: xíngzhènggōngshǔ) of the league is the administrative branch office dispatched by the People's Government of Inner Mongolia Autonomous Region. The leader of the league's government, titled as league leader (simplified Chinese: 盟长; traditional Chinese: 盟長; pinyin: méngzhǎng), is appointed by People's Government of Inner Mongolia Autonomous Region. So are deputy leaders of leagues. Instead of local level of People's Congress, league's working commissions of the Standing Committee of the People’s Congress of Inner Mongolia Autonomous Region are detached and supervise the league's governments, but can not elect or dismiss league's government officials. In such a way, the league's working committee of the Inner Mongolia Autonomous Region's committee of the Chinese People's Political Consultative Conference is instead of league's committee of CPPCC.

Leagues have existed since the Qing dynasty as a level of government. The head of a league was chosen from jasagh or sula of the banners belonging to it. The original six leagues were Jirem, Ju Ud, Jost, Xilingol, Ulanqab, and Ih Ju. More were added in the subsequent centuries.

Today, leagues belong to the prefecture level of the Chinese administrative hierarchy. Of the 9 leagues that existed in the late 1970s, 6 have now been reorganized into prefecture-level cities. There are only 3 leagues remaining in Inner Mongolia: Xilingol, Alxa, and Hinggan.

== Leagues (1949–present) ==
=== Current ===
Name	Mongolian	Transcription and IPA (Chakhar Mongolian)	Simplified Chinese	Pinyin	Capital	Notes
Hinggan	ᠬᠢᠩᠭᠠᠨ	Hinggan [xɪŋɡ̊ɑ̆n]	兴安	Xīng'ān	Ulanhot	Established: 26 July 1980
Xilingol	ᠰᠢᠯᠢ ᠶᠢᠨ ᠭᠣᠤᠯ	Xiliin Gôl	锡林郭勒	Xīlínguōlè	Xilinhot	Present day: Xilingol and Hinggan (1954)
Alxa	ᠠᠯᠠᠱᠠᠨ	Alxaa	阿拉善	Ālāshàn	Bayanhot Town, Alxa Left Banner	Until 1954 it was known as Alxa Öölüd Banners and Ejin Torghuud Banner

=== Defunct ===
Name	Mongolian	Transcription and IPA (Chakhar Mongolian)	Simplified Chinese	Pinyin	Capital	Notes
Bayannur	ᠪᠠᠶ᠋ᠠᠨᠨᠠᠭᠤᠷ	Bayan Nûûr	巴彦淖尔	Bāyànnào'ěr	Linhe (Linhe District)	Dissolution: 1 December 2003; Present day: Bayannur (prefecture-level city)
Jirem	ᠵᠢᠷᠢᠮ	Jirem	哲里木	Zhélǐmù	Bayisingtu (Horqin District)	Dissolution: 13 January 1999; Present day: Tongliao (prefecture-level city)
Ju Ud	ᠵᠤᠤ ᠤᠳᠠ	Jûû Ûd	昭乌达	Zhāowūdá	Ulanhad (Hongshan District)	Dissolution: 10 October 1983; Present day: Chifeng (prefecture-level city)
Jost	ᠵᠣᠰᠤᠲᠤ ᠶᠢᠨ	Jôstiin	卓索图	Zhuósuǒtú	Chaoyang (Shuangta District)	Dissolution: 10 October 1911; Present day: Fuxin, Chaoyang, and part of Chifeng (prefecture-level city)
Chahar	ᠴᠠᠬᠠᠷ	Qahar	察哈尔	Cháhā'ěr	Baochang	Dissolution: 1 October 1958 merged into Xilingol and Ulanqab
Ulanqab	ᠤᠯᠠᠭᠠᠨᠴᠠᠪ	Ulaanqab	乌兰察布	Wūlánchábù	Jining (Jining District)	Dissolution: 1 December 2003; Present day: Ulanqab (prefecture-level city), Baotou (1954), & Bayannur (1954)
Ih Ju	ᠶᠡᠺᠡ ᠵᠣᠤ	Ih Jûû	伊克昭	Yīkèzhāo	Dongsheng (Dongsheng District)	Dissolution: 26 February 2001; Present day: Ordos (prefecture-level city)
Heilongjiang (present day northern part of Inner Mongolia)
Hulunbuir–Nunmoron	ᠬᠥᠯᠦᠨᠪᠤᠶᠢᠷ ᠨᠤᠨ ᠮᠥᠷᠡᠨ	Holon Bûir–Nûûn Moron	呼伦贝尔纳文慕仁 / 呼纳	Hūlúnbèi'ěr–Nàwénmùrén / Hūnà	Hailar (Hailar District)	Dissolution: 1 April 1953 merge into Inner Mongolia Eastern Administrative Zone
Hulunbuir	ᠬᠥᠯᠦᠨᠪᠤᠶᠢᠷ	Holon Bûir	呼伦贝尔	Hūlúnbèi'ěr	Hailar (Hailar District)	Dissolution: 11 April 1949; Merged into Hulunbuir-Nunmoron; Re-established: 21 May 1954; Dissolution: 10 October 2001 (present day greater Hulunbuir)
Nun Moron	ᠨᠤᠨ ᠮᠥᠷᠡᠨ	Nûûn Moron	纳文慕仁	Nàwénmùrén	Zhalantun	Dissolution: 11 April 1949 merge into Hulunbuir–Nunmoron

== Original leagues of the Qing ==
=== The 6 leagues under Inner Mongolia ===
Inner Mongolian leagues (in yellow) in 1911

Name	Mongolian	Transcription and IPA (Chakhar Mongolian)	Simplified Chinese	Pinyin	Tribes & Banners
Jirem	ᠵᠢᠷᠢᠮ	Jirem	哲里木	Zhélǐmù	4 tribes 10 banners
Jost	ᠵᠣᠰᠤᠲᠤ ᠶᠢᠨ	Jôstiin	卓索图	Zhuósuǒtú	2 tribes 5 banners
Ju Ud; Ju'ud	ᠵᠤᠤ ᠤᠳᠠ	Jûû Ûd	昭乌达	Zhāowūdá	8 tribes 11 banners
Xilingol	ᠰᠢᠯᠢ ᠶᠢᠨ ᠭᠣᠤᠯ	Xiliin Gôl	锡林郭勒	Xīlínguōlè	5 tribes 10 banners
Ulanqab	ᠤᠯᠠᠭᠠᠨᠴᠠᠪ	Ulaanqab	乌兰察布	Wūlánchábù	4 tribes 6 banners
Ih Ju; Ihju	ᠶᠡᠺᠡ ᠵᠣᠤ	Ih Jûû	伊克昭	Yīkèzhāo	1 tribe 7 banners

=== Changes ===
Year(s)	Leagues
1636–1928 (Qûûlgan)	Jirem, Ju Ud, Jost, Xilingol, Ulanqab, and Ih Ju
1928–1938 (Qûûlgan and Province)	Jirem, Ju Ud, Jost, Xilingol, Chahar Province (Qahar), Ulanqab, and Ih Ju
1938–1945 (ROC)	Jirem, Ih Ju
1938–1945 (Mengjiang)	Ju Ud, Xilingol, Chahar (Qahar), Ulanqab, Bayantala (Bayantal)
1945–1948 (Aimag)	Nun Moron, Jirem, Ju Ud, Jost, Xilingol, Qahar, Ulanqab, and Ih Ju
1948–1949 (Aimag)	Hulunbuir, Nun Moron, Jirem, Ju Ud, Jost, Xilingol, Qahar, Ulanqab, and Ih Ju
1949 (Aimag)	Hulunbuir, Nun Moron, Jirem, Ju Ud, Jost, Xilingol, Qahar, Ulanqab, and Ih Ju
1949–1953 (Aimag)	Hulunbuir–Nun Moron, Hinggan, Jirem, Ju Ud, Xilingol, Qahar
1953 (Aimag)	Ju Ud, Xilingol, Qahar
1953–1956 (Aimag)	Hulunbuir, Jirem, Ju Ud, Xilingol, Qahar, Ulanqab, Ih Ju
1956–1958 (Aimag)	Hulunbuir, Jirem, Ju Ud, Xilingol, Qahar, Ulanqab, Ih Ju, Bayannur
1958–1969 (Aimag)	Hulunbuir, Jirem, Ju Ud, Xilingol, Ulanqab, Ih Ju, Bayannur
1969–1979 (Inner Mongolia)	Xilingol, Ulanqab, Ih Ju, Bayannur
1969–1979 (Heilongjiang)	Hulunbuir
1969–1979 (Jilin)	Jirem
1979–1980 (Aimag)	Hulunbuir, Jirem, Ju Ud, Xilingol, Ulanqab, Ih Ju, Bayannur, Alxa
1980–1983 (Aimag)	Hulunbuir, Hinggan, Jirem, Ju Ud, Xilingol, Ulanqab, Ih Ju, Bayannur, Alxa
1983–1999 (Aimag)	Hulunbuir, Hinggan, Jirem, Xilingol, Ulanqab, Ih Ju, Bayannur, Alxa
1999–2001 (Aimag)	Hulunbuir, Hinggan, Xilingol, Ulanqab, Ih Ju, Bayannur, Alxa
2001–2003 (Aimag)	Hinggan, Xilingol, Ulanqab, Bayannur, Alxa
2003–present (Aimag)	Hinggan, Xilingol, Alxa

== See also ==
- Administrative divisions of Mongolia during Qing
- Administrative divisions of the People's Republic of China
- Prefecture of China
- List of prefecture-level divisions of China
- Banner (Inner Mongolia)
- Eight Banner system
- List of administrative divisions of Inner Mongolia
- Aimag
