= Sum (administrative division) =

Administrative division used in China, Mongolia, and Russia

A sum is an administrative division used in China, Mongolia, and Russia. Countries such as China and Mongolia have employed the sum as administrative division, which was used during the Qing dynasty. This system was acted in the 1980s after the Chinese Communist Party gained power in conjunction with their growing internal and external problems. The decentralisation of government included restructuring of organisational methods, reduction of roles in rural government and creation of sums.

== Mongolia ==
A sum (Mongolian: сум, ᠰᠤᠮᠤ, [sʰo̙m]) is the second level administrative division below the aimags (provinces), roughly comparable to a county in the United States. There are 330 sums in Mongolia. Each sum is again divided into bags, bag being commonly translated as "brigade."

== Russia ==
In Russia, a sumon is an administrative division of the Tuva Republic, and somon is that of the Buryat Republic. Both describe the Russian term selsoviet.

== China ==
In Inner Mongolia, a sum (ᠰᠤᠮᠤ), sometimes called a sumu (Chinese: 苏木; pinyin: sūmù), is an administrative division. The sum division is equivalent to a township but is unique to Inner Mongolia. It is therefore larger than a gaqa (ᠭᠠᠴᠠᠭᠠ гацаа) and smaller than a banner (the Inner Mongolia equivalent of the county-level division). Examples include Shiwei, Inner Mongolia and Honggor Sum, Siziwang Banner.

Sums whose population is predominated by ethnic minorities are designated ethnic sums – parallel with the ethnic township in the rest of China. As of 2010, there is only one ethnic sum in China, the Evenk Ethnic Sum.

== See also ==
- Aimag
