= Rock Paintings of Alashan =

Archaeological site in Alashan, Inner Mongolia

Alashan Petroglyphs
- Periods: Upper Paleolithic, Neolithic and Bronze Age
- Location: Alashan, Inner Mongolia

Rock Paintings of Alashan or Rock Paintings of Alxa (simplified Chinese: 阿拉善岩画; traditional Chinese: 阿拉善岩畫; pinyin: Ālā shàn Yánhuà), also known as Alxa Rock Art or Alashan Rock Art, are images carved into the rocks of Alashan, Inner Mongolia. These rock paintings have distinctive characteristics, mainly in the dense images and fresh carvings, and the subject matter is mainly the expression of human activities.

The census of cultural relics conducted in Alashan in 1985 brought Rock Paintings of Alashan into the public eye. As of March 2020, more than 50,000 groups of Alashan Rock Art have been discovered.

== Distribution ==
Rock Paintings of Alashan are mainly distributed in Alashan Left Banner and Alashan Right Banner of Alashan League in the western part of Inner Mongolia, including Yinshan Rock Paintings, Rock Paintings of Helan Mountains (贺兰山岩画) and Rock Paintings of Mandela Mountains (曼德拉山岩画). Alashan Rock Art is called "Historical Picture Scroll of the Northern Peoples" (北方民族的历史画卷).

== Creation periods ==
The creation periods of Alashan Rock Art can be divided into three major periods, namely Upper Paleolithic, Neolithic and Bronze Age.

== Conservation ==
In February 2019, the Administrative Office of Alxa League (阿拉善盟行政公署) issued and implemented the Measures for the Protection and Management of Alashan Petroglyphs (阿拉善岩画保护管理办法), which provides a legal basis for the protection of Alashan Petroglyphs.

== Style Characteristics ==
The content of the subject matter of Alashan Rock Art includes hunting, herding, dancing, wars, vehicles, tents and villages made up of tents, in addition to various animals. In addition, there are various patterns and Tibetan characters.

These petroglyphs reproduce the colorful life scenes of the primitive clan tribes, as well as Xiongnu, Qiang, Dangxiang, Mongolian and other ethnic groups that used to be active on the Alashan grassland in ancient times.
