= Alxa =

Alxa (Chinese: 阿拉善; pinyin: ālāshàn; Mongolian: Alaša) may refer to several places in Inner Mongolia, China:

- Alxa League, prefecture-level division
- Alxa Left Banner, county-level division
- Alxa Right Banner, county-level division
- Alxa Desert, a desert
