= Rock Paintings of Bayanhaote =

Bayanhot Petroglyphs
- Periods: Late Neolithic to Qing dynasty
- Location: Western foot of Helan Mountains, Alxa Left Banner

Rock Paintings of Bayanhaote or Rock Paintings of Bayanhot (simplified Chinese: 巴彦浩特岩画; traditional Chinese: 巴彥浩特岩畫; pinyin: Bāyànhàotè Yánhuà), also known as Bayanhaote Rock Paintings or Bayanhot Rock Paintings, are images carved into the rocks of Bayanhaote, Alxa Left Banner, Inner Mongolia.

Petroglyphs Complexes of Bayanhaote includes three rock painting sites, such as Rock Paintings of Halawugoukou (哈喇乌沟口岩画), Rock Paintings of Zheyao Mountain (折腰山岩画) and Rock Paintings of Huoshaoquan (火烧圈岩画).

In 2018, Alashan League built the Bayanhot Petroglyphs Heritage Park (巴彦浩特岩画遗址公园) in Helan Grassland (贺兰草原), where Bayanhot Petroglyphs are more concentrated.

== Creation periods ==
From the production methods and contents of the petroglyphs, these rock paintings were carved from the Late Neolithic to Qing dynasty, with a large span of time.

== Discoveries ==
In 2013, Petroglyphs Complexes of Bayanhaote (巴彦浩特岩画群) first appeared in the lens of a hiking photographer in Bayanhot.

In 2017, Cultural Relics Management Bureau of Alxa Left Banner (阿拉善左旗文物管理局) newly discovered an ancient petroglyphs complexes created 2000 years ago in Bayanhot Town (巴彦浩特镇), which was named "Bayanhot Rock Paintings", with a total area of about 12 square kilometers.
