= 2026 Liushenyu coal mine explosion =

2026 disaster in Shanxi, China

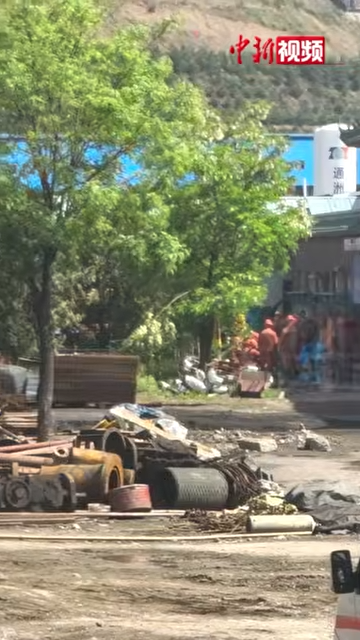
- Aftermath of the explosion
- Date: 22 May 2026
- Time: 19:29 (CST; UTC+08:00)
- Venue: Liushenyu Coal Mine
- Location: Qinyuan County, Shanxi, China; 36°35′33″N 112°12′36″E
- Cause: Firedamp explosion
- Deaths: 82
- Injuries: 123

On 22 May 2026, a gas explosion occurred at the Liushenyu Coal Mine (Note: Chinese: 留神峪煤业有限公司; pinyin: Liúshényù Méiyè Yǒuxiàn Gōngsī) in Qinyuan County, Shanxi, China, killing 82 people.

At the time of the explosion, 247 workers were on duty underground. According to the Xinhua News Agency, by 6:00 CST on 23 May, at least 201 people had been evacuated. Later that day, 9 people remained missing. Xi Jinping, the general secretary of the Chinese Communist Party, called for an immediate rescue of trapped workers and for an investigation into the cause of the explosion. Xinhua reported on 23 May that executives of the Shanxi Tongzhou Group Liushenyu Coal Industry, which operates the Liushenyu mine, had been detained.

As of 25 May 2026, both rescue operations and investigations into the explosion's cause remained ongoing.

== Background ==
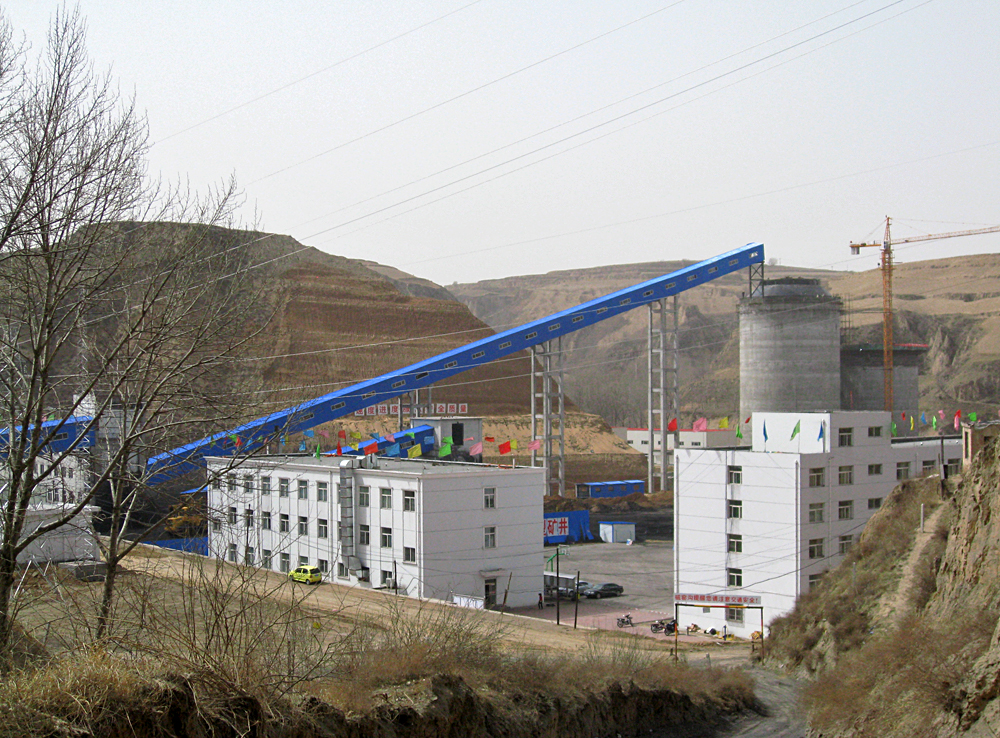
Exterior of a Shanxi coal mine, similar to the one involved

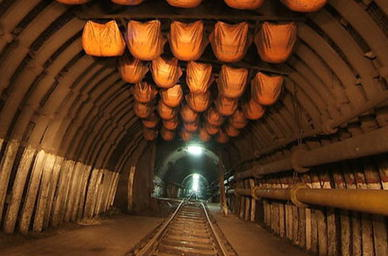
Example image of the interior of a Chinese coal mine

Coal is a key source of energy in China, accounting for over half of national energy consumption. Shanxi, known as China's coal-mining capital, accounts for over a quarter of the country's production; coal is a main part of its economy. Shanxi is home to a mining industry known for its poor safety record. In the early 2000s, deadly accidents were common in the Chinese coal mining industry. Though safety standards have since improved through tighter regulations and safer practices, incidents persist despite industry consolidation and government demands for improved safety. In 2023, fifty-three people were killed in a mine collapse in Inner Mongolia.

The Liushenyu Coal Mine is operated by Shanxi Tongzhou Group Liushenyu Coal Industry. In 2024, it was listed as one of 1,128 facilities cited for "severe safety hazards" by the Chinese National Mine Safety Administration.

== Explosion ==
At 19:29 China Standard Time (CST) on 22 May 2026, a gas explosion occurred at the Liushenyu Coal Mine in Qinyuan County, Shanxi, China. According to Xinhua, local authorities had been alerted on the night of 22 May that an underground carbon monoxide sensor at the Liushenyu mine had triggered an alarm, indicating that carbon monoxide levels had "exceeded limits". At the time of the explosion, 247 workers were on duty underground.

== Casualties and impact ==
The Liushenyu explosion is the deadliest mining disaster to occur in China in over a decade. Initial reports said only that 8 people had been killed. By the next day, the death toll had risen to 90 before being revised to 82. By 06:00 on 23 May according to the Chinese state news agency Xinhua, at least 201 people had been evacuated; nine people remained missing later that day, while 123 people were injured, four critically. As of 24 May, two remain missing.

On 23 May, Xinhua reported that executives of Shanxi Tongzhou Group Liushenyu Coal Industry, the company responsible for the Liushenyu mine, had been detained.

== Rescue and investigation efforts ==
According to Xinhua News Agency, CCP General Secretary Xi Jinping called for an "all-out rescue" of those missing, and "stressed the need to make every effort to treat the injured, organize search and rescue operations scientifically and properly handle the aftermath". In addition, Xi "urged a thorough investigation into its cause, with accountability pursued in accordance with the law". Premier Li Qiang also called for the timely and accurate release of information and rigorous accountability.

The Chinese Ministry of Emergency Management sent 345 personnel from six rescue teams to assist in the rescue operation. The Emergency Management Bureau of Qinyuan County told CNN that a team of 400 to 500 people were conducting underground rescue work. It also said that province-level leaders had arrived at the site of the explosion. State media footage released on 23 May showed paramedics and other rescuers having arrived at the site of the explosion. Over 100 people had been taken to the hospital.

According to China Central Television (CCTV) and the local emergency management authority in Qinyuan County, rescue operations remained ongoing and the cause remained under investigation as of 23 May.

The phone operator at Shanxi Tongzhou Group Liushenyu Coal Industry said they were "not aware of the situation" when asked for comment by CNN on 23 May.

== See also ==
- Alxa Left Banner mine collapse
- 2026 Liuyang fireworks factory explosion – another 2026 explosion incident in China
