= Yanfu Temple (Alxa League) =

- 延福寺
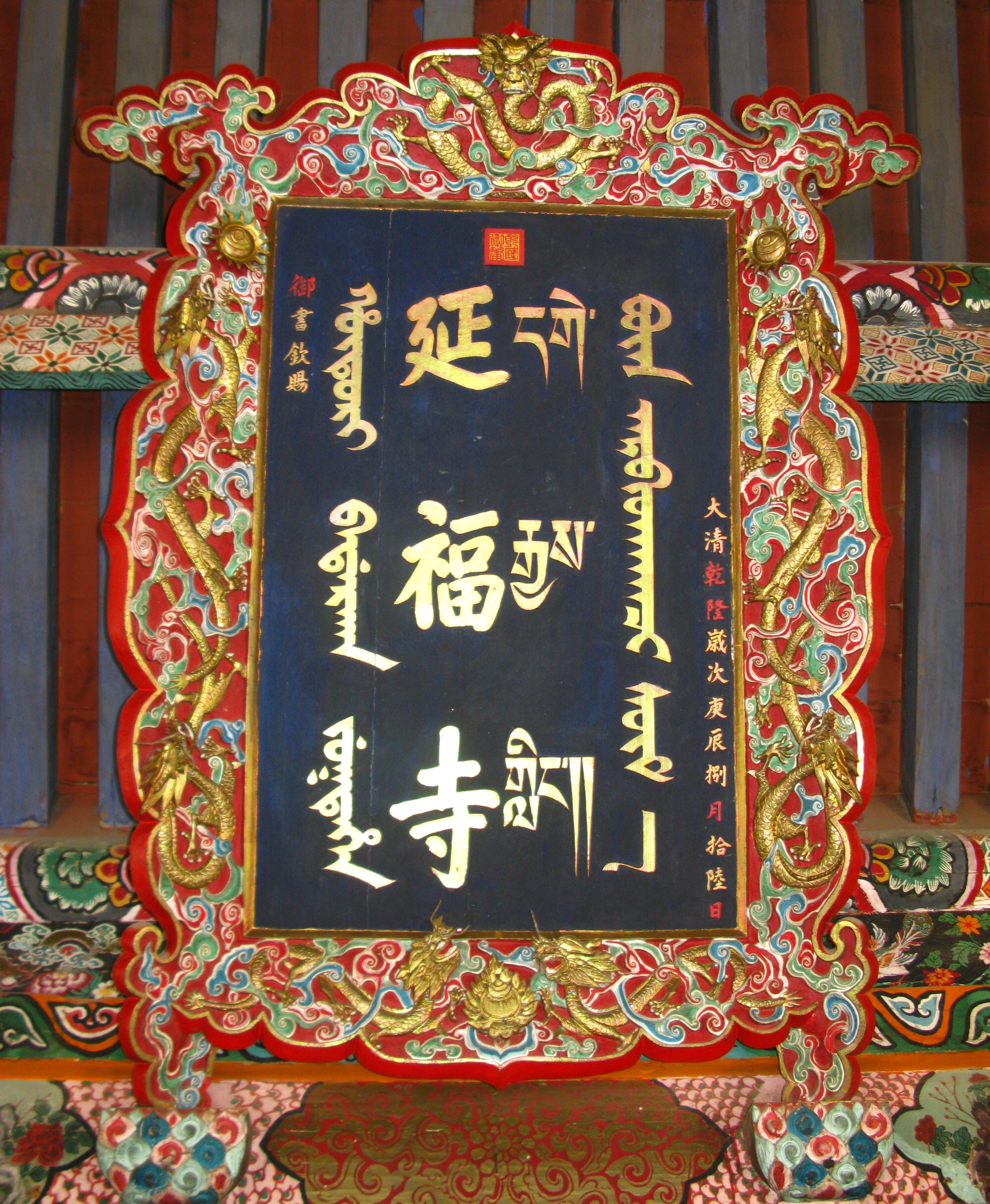
- A plaque with characters "Yanfu Temple" hang on the eaves of a hall in Yanfu Temple.

- Location within Inner Mongolia

Religion
- Affiliation: Buddhism
- Deity: Tibetan Buddhism
- Leadership: Gelug

Location
- Location: Alxa Left Banner, Alxa League, Inner Mongolia
- Country: China
- Interactive map of Yanfu Temple
- Coordinates: 38°50′23.07″N 105°40′26.72″E

Architecture
- Style: Chinese architecture
- Founder: Government of Inner Mongolia
- Established: 1731

Yanfu Temple (Chinese: 延福寺; pinyin: Yánfú Sì), more commonly known as Prince Temple (simplified Chinese: 王爷庙; traditional Chinese: 王爺廟; pinyin: Wángye Miào), is a Buddhist temple located in Alxa Left Banner, Alxa League, Inner Mongolia China. Yanfu Temple is considered one of the Three Great Buddhist Temples in Alxa League, alongside Fuyin Temple and Guangzong Temple.

== History ==
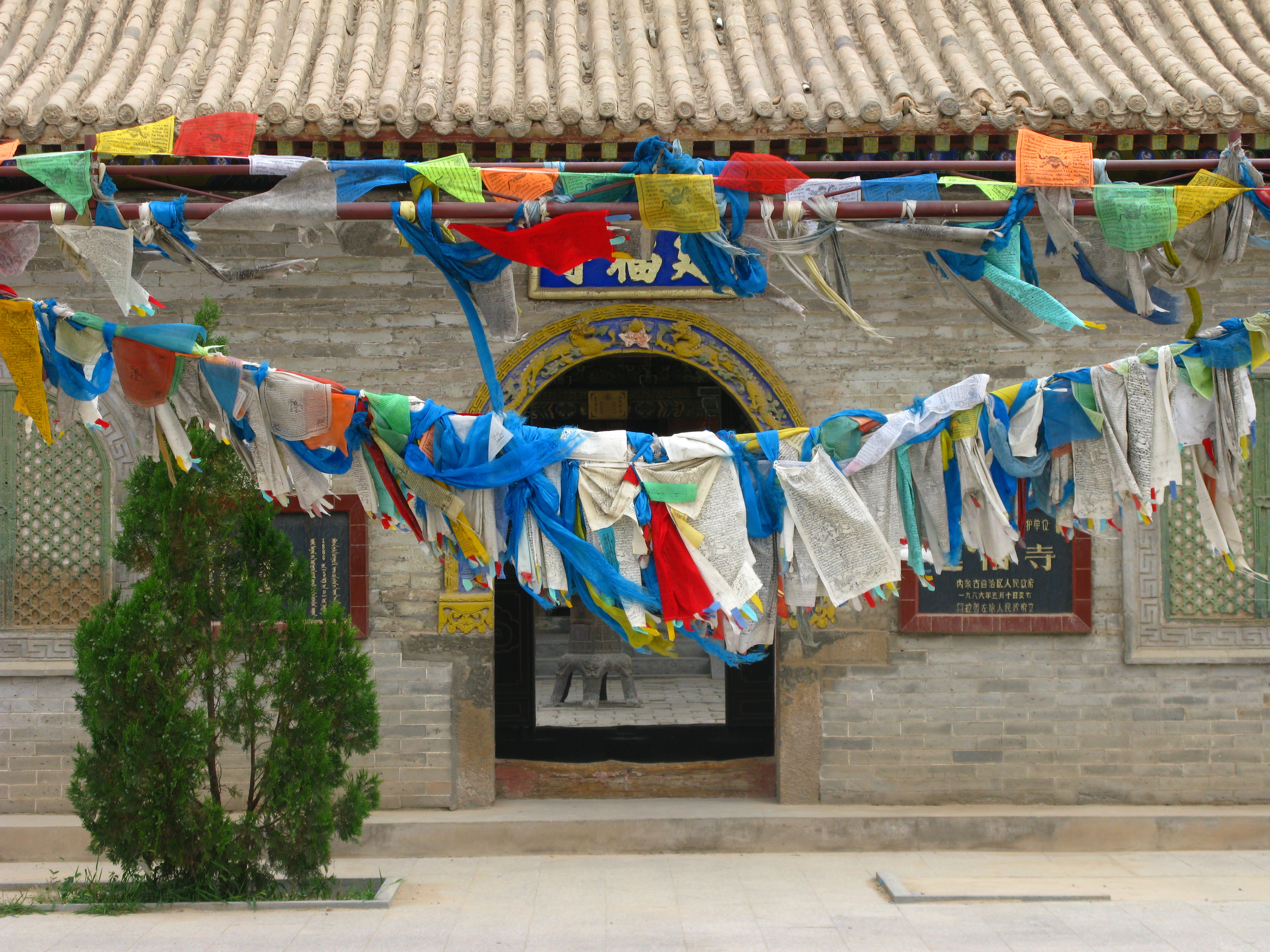
Yanfu Temple.

The temple was first established in 1731, in the 9th year of Yongzheng period in the Qing dynasty (1644–1911). The Mahavira Hall was added to the temple between 1737 and 1739 by Prince Luobozangduoerji (罗卜藏多尔济). In 1760, Qianlong Emperor inscribed and honored the name "Yanfu Temple" (延福寺). In 1805, Prince Mahabala (马哈巴拉) erected the Agaba Hall (阿格巴殿), Guanyin Hall, Dalike Temple (达理克庙) and renovated the Jingang Hall and Bhaisajyaguru Hall.

In 1932, Prince Dalizhaya (达理札雅) ordered to repair the Mahavira Hall.

During the ten-year Cultural Revolution the Red Guards attacked the temple, halls, statues and other works of art were either removed, damaged or destroyed in the massive socialist movement.

After the 3rd Plenary Session of the 11th Central Committee of the Chinese Communist Party, a policy of some religious freedom was implemented. Yanfu Temple reactivated its religious activities. As of 2012, the temple had over 40 halls and rooms and more than 40 lamas.

On 10 May 1986, the temple was inscribed to the Second Inner Mongolia Cultural Heritage List.

In 2006, it was listed among the sixth batch of "Major National Historical and Cultural Sites in Inner Mongolia" by the State Council of China.

== Architecture ==
Now the existing main buildings include the Sutra Hall, Hall of Bodhisattva, Hall of Four Heavenly Kings, Hall of Sakyamuni, Hall of Bhaisajyaguru, Vajrayana Hall, Bell tower, Drum tower, etc. The temple covers an area of 6,700 square metres (72,000 sq ft) with 282 halls and rooms.
