= Alxa Left Banner Bayanhot Airport =

Alxa Left Banner Bayanhot Airport 阿拉善左旗巴彦浩特机场
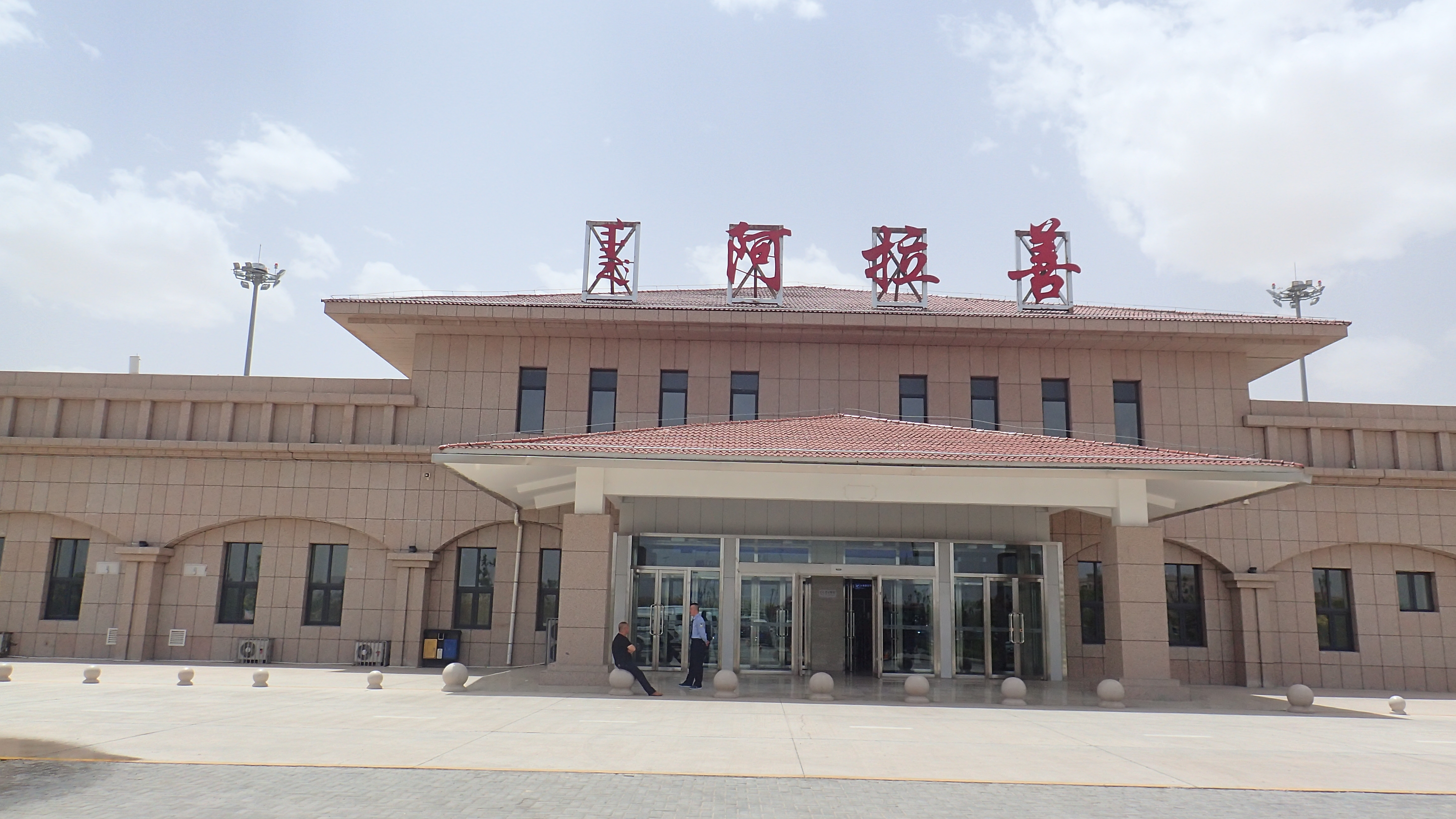
- IATA: AXF; ICAO: ZBAL

Summary
- Airport type: Public
- Operator: Inner Mongolia Civil Airports Group Co.
- Serves: Bayanhot, Alxa Left Banner, Inner Mongolia, China
- Opened: 17 December 2013
- Elevation AMSL: 1,390 m / 4,560 ft
- Coordinates: 38.74831°N 105.58858°E

Map
- Location of airport in Inner Mongolia

Runways
Direction	Length		Surface
Direction	m	ft	Surface
14/32	2,400	7,874	Concrete

Statistics (2021)
- Passengers: 66,151
- Aircraft movements: 1,796
- Cargo (metric tons): 22.4
- Source: Flightstats

Alxa Left Banner Bayanhot Airport
- Simplified Chinese: 阿拉善左旗巴彦浩特机场
- Traditional Chinese: 阿拉善左旗巴彥浩特機場
Transcriptions
Standard Mandarin
- Hanyu Pinyin: Ālāshàn Zuǒ Qí Bāyànhàotè Jīchǎng

Alxa Left Banner Bayanhot Airport (IATA: AXF, ICAO: ZBAL) is a regional airport serving Bayanhot, the main urban center of Alxa Left Banner in Inner Mongolia, China.

== Overview ==
Bayanhot Airport is one of the three airports of Alxa League in western Inner Mongolia, the other two being Alxa Right Banner Badanjilin Airport and Ejin Banner Taolai Airport. The three airports form a commuter airport network that connects the three banners of Alxa League, which covers a vast area (272,000 square kilometres (105,000 sq mi)) of the Gobi Desert.

Construction for the airports started in August 2012, with a total investment of 389.5 million yuan, and all three airports opened on 17 December 2013. All three airports are classified 3C, suitable for 50-seat aircraft such as the Xian MA60. Bayanhot is the biggest among the three, and it is projected to handle 250,000 passengers annually by 2020, compared with 80,000 for Taolai and 45,000 for Badanjilin.

== Airlines and destinations ==
Airlines	Destinations
China Express Airlines	Chifeng, Hohhot, Ordos, Tongliao, Xilinhot

== See also ==
- List of the busiest airports in China
