= EJN =

EJN may refer to:

- Earth Journalism Network
- Ejin Banner Taolai Airport, in Inner Mongolia, China
- European Judicial Network
- European Journal of Neuroscience
