= Guangzong Temple =

Guangzong Temple (simplified Chinese: 广宗寺; traditional Chinese: 廣宗寺; pinyin: Guǎngzōng Sì), may refer to:

- Guangzong Temple (Mount Wutai), on Mount Wutai, in Wutai County, Shanxi, China
- Guangzong Temple (Inner Mongolia), in Alxa Left Banner, Inner Mongolia, China
