= Alxa Right Banner Badanjilin Airport =

Airport in Inner Mongolia, China

Alxa Right Banner Badanjilin Airport 阿拉善右旗巴丹吉林机场
- IATA: RHT; ICAO: ZBAR

Summary
- Airport type: Public
- Operator: Inner Mongolia Civil Airports Group Co.
- Serves: Badanjilin, Alxa Right Banner, Inner Mongolia, China
- Opened: 17 December 2013; 12 years ago
- Elevation AMSL: 1,420 m / 4,659 ft
- Coordinates: 39.225°N 101.546°E

Map
- Location of airport in Inner Mongolia

Runways
Direction	Length		Surface
Direction	m	ft	Surface
13/31	2,400	7,874	Concrete

Statistics (2021)
- Passengers: 2,191
- Aircraft movements: 105
- Source: Flightstats

Alxa Right Banner Badanjilin Airport
- Simplified Chinese: 阿拉善右旗巴丹吉林机场
- Traditional Chinese: 阿拉善右旗巴丹吉林機場
Transcriptions
Standard Mandarin
- Hanyu Pinyin: Ālāshàn Yòu Qí Bādānjílín Jīchǎng

Alxa Right Banner Badanjilin Airport (IATA: RHT, ICAO: ZBAR) is a regional airport serving the town of Badanjilin, the seat of Alxa Right Banner in Inner Mongolia, China.

== Overview ==
Badanjilin Airport is one of the three airports of Alxa League in western Inner Mongolia, the other two being Alxa Left Banner Bayanhot Airport and Ejin Banner Taolai Airport. The three airports form a commuter airport network that connects the three banners of Alxa League, which covers a vast area (272,000 square kilometres (105,000 sq mi)) of the Gobi Desert.

Construction for the airports started in August 2012, with a total investment of 389.5 million yuan, and all three airports opened on 17 December 2013. All three airports are classified 3C, suitable for 50-seat aircraft such as the Xian MA60. Badajilin is the smallest among the three, and it is projected to handle 45,000 passengers annually by 2020, compared with 250,000 for Bayanhot and 80,000 for Taolai.

== See also ==
- List of airports in China
