= Rock Paintings of Shuimogou =

Archaeological site in Inner Mongolia

Shuimogou Petroglyphs
- Periods: Late Stone Age to Iron Age
- Location: Western foot of Helan Mountains, Alxa Left Banner

The Rock Paintings of Shuimogou (simplified Chinese: 水磨沟岩画; traditional Chinese: 水磨溝岩畫; pinyin: Shuǐmògōu Yánhuà) are images carved into the rocks of Shuimogou, Alxa Left Banner, Inner Mongolia. The petroglyphs were first discovered in March 2020, and provide important materials and a basis for further understanding the origin and evolution of Chinese rock paintings.

== Location and name ==
The petroglyphss are located about 15 kilometres (9.3 mi) northeast of Bayanhaote Town (巴彦浩特镇) and are named for their proximity to Shuimogou (水磨沟) in the Helan Mountains.

== Archaeology ==
The Shuimogou petroglyphs were created from the Late Stone Age to the Iron Age. The site also features stone walls, stone enclosures and burial remains of different eras.
