= Yanfu Temple =

Yanfu Temple (Chinese: 延福寺; pinyin: Yánfú Sì), may refer to:

- Yanfu Temple (Alxa League), in Inner Mongolia, China
- Yanfu Temple (Wuyi County), in Jinhua, Zhejiang, China
