= Yinshan Rock Paintings =

Images carved into rocks

Petroglyphs of Yin Mountains
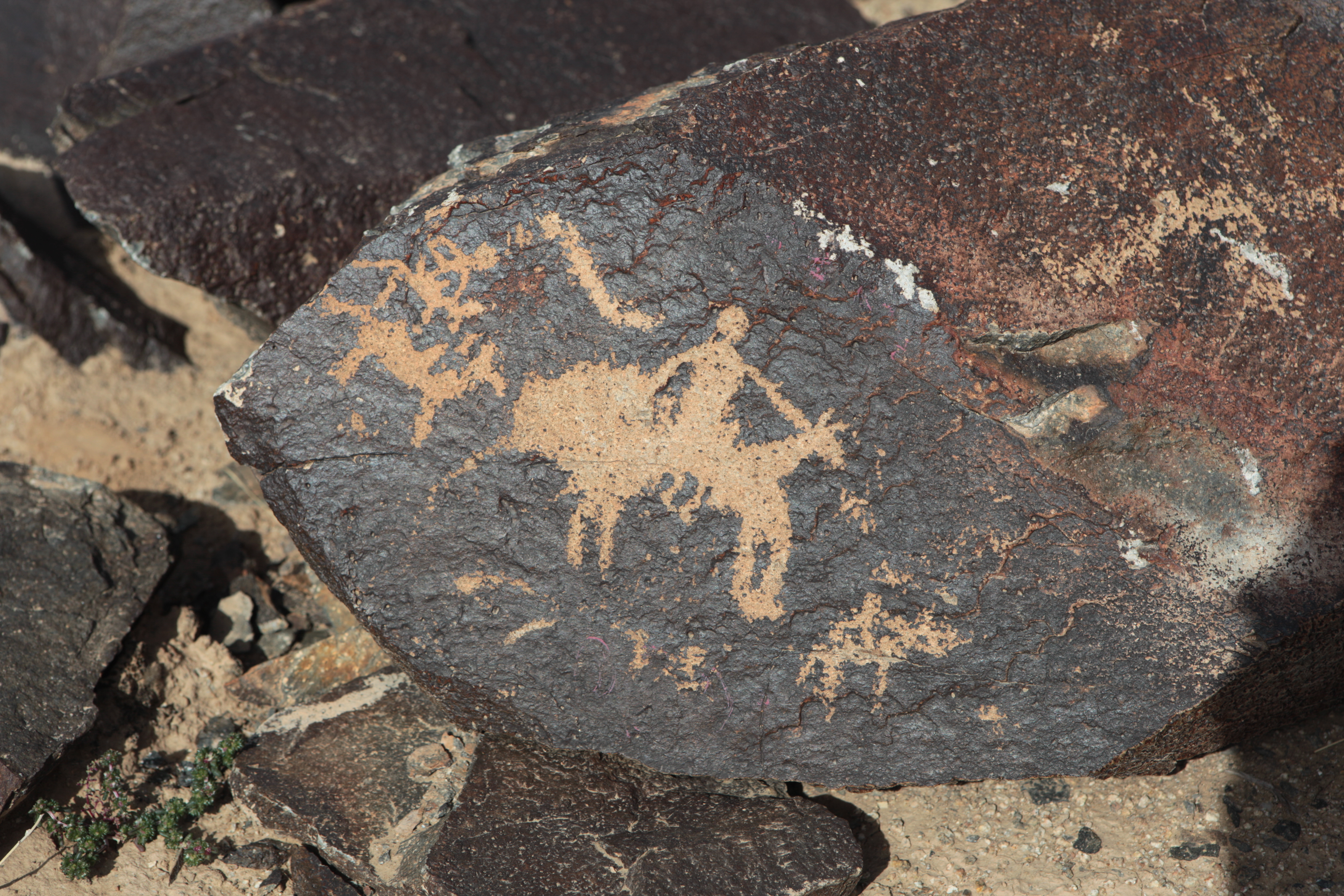
- One of thousands of rock paintings found in the Yin Mountains
- Interactive map of Petroglyphs of Yin Mountains
- Periods: Neolithic, Bronze Age, Iron Age
- Location: Inner Mongolia

Site notes
- Discovered: 5th century AD

Yinshan Rock Paintings or Rock Paintings of Yinshan Mountains (simplified Chinese: 阴山岩画; traditional Chinese: 陰山岩畫; pinyin: Yīnshān Yánhuà), also known as Petroglyphs in the Yinshan Mountains or Rock Paintings of Yinshan Mountain, are images carved into the rocks of the Yin Mountains and are widely distributed, mainly on the cliffs of Wolf Mountain in the Inner Mongolia, with themes involving animals, figures, deities, artifacts, celestial bodies.

The historical and cultural site is mainly located on Yin Mountains in the western part of Inner Mongolia, east of the Alxa Left Banner.

In ancient history, Yinshan Rock Paintings were first recorded by Li Daoyuan, a Northern Wei geographer, in the 5th century AD. In modern history, they were discovered on January 28, 1980.

== Discoveries and Researches ==
=== Ancient times ===
The earliest record of the petroglyphs is dated to the 5th century AD, when Li Daoyuan described the presence of tiger, horse and goat petroglyphs in the Yin Mountains in the Commentary on the Water Classic. This is considered to be the earliest record of the Yinshan petroglyphs. Although much of Li's information was gathered second-hand from other people, he visited the region of Tumed Left Banner and Togtoh County in modern Inner Mongolia from where he is recorded to have travelled west. Thus, it is thought that he observed the Yin Mountain petroglyphs personally. He is frequently credited as the first person to discover the images. However, for several centuries after Li Daoyuan, no one else recorded these rock paintings. It was not until the 1930s that the Sino-Swiss Northwest Scientific Investigation Group (中瑞西北科学考察团) discovered several Yinshan rock paintings.

=== Modern times ===
In 1974, Chinese archaeologist Gai Shanlin (盖山林) first saw the petroglyphs of Yin Mountains during a field survey. At the end of the 1970s, Gai conducted a survey of the Yinshan Rock Paintings, published a book Petroglyphs in the Yinshan Mountains in 1986, giving a more comprehensive introduction to the census results. In early 1980, Gai discovered thousands of petroglyphs in the western section of Yin Mountain in Inner Mongolia. This discovery drew great attention from the archaeological community in China and abroad.

The comprehensive investigation of the Yinshan Rock Paintings began in 1976. Since then, many experts, scholars and tourists have been visiting the territory of Bayannur every year, and more than 10,000 rock paintings of Yinshan have been discovered. These petroglyphs not only reflect the beliefs, aesthetic outlook and worldview of the ancient inhabitants of the Yinshan region, but also reveal their nomadic living conditions.

=== Contemporary times ===
Researches show that the creation of the Yinshan Rock Paintings can be dated back to as early as 10,000 years ago, and they have gone through 10 historical stages: the Neolithic, Bronze Age, Warring States Period, Qin and Han Periods, North and South Dynasties, Sui and Tang Periods, Western Xia Period, Mongolian Yuan Period, and Ming and Qing Periods, which truly record the production life, customs, religious beliefs, natural environment, and social appearance of the nomadic peoples in the northern China.

In December 2010, about 500 Bronze Age grinded petroglyphs were found in Urad Middle Banner, located in the Yinshan region, including two drawings of human sexual intercourse, one with 2 people and the other with 3 people. Rock paintings of human sexual intercourse are rare in this area.

== Conservations ==
In 2006, Yinshan Rock Paintings was included in the sixth batch of the list of Major Historical and Cultural Site Protected at the National Level in China. Inner Mongolia invested about more than 14 million yuan to start a large-scale rescue census and protection project, as well as to build a solar-powered electronic video monitoring system.

== Related books and Articles ==
- Paola Demattè (2004) Beyond Shamanism: Landscape and Self-Expression in the Petroglyphs of Inner Mongolia and Ningxia
- Shanlin Gai (1986). Petroglyphs in the Yinshan Mountains. Cultural Relics Publishing House.
- Wang Xiaokun (2012). Study on Petroglyphs in the Yinshan Mountains. China Social Sciences Press.
