= Ejin Banner Taolai Airport =

Airport in Inner Mongolia, China

Ejin Banner Taolai Airport 额济纳旗桃来机场
- IATA: EJN; ICAO: ZBEN

Summary
- Airport type: Public
- Operator: Inner Mongolia Civil Airports Group Co.
- Serves: Ejin Banner, Inner Mongolia, China
- Opened: 17 December 2013; 12 years ago
- Elevation AMSL: 935 m / 3,068 ft
- Coordinates: 42°0′56″N 101°0′2″E

Map
- Location of airport in Inner Mongolia

Runways
Direction	Length		Surface
Direction	m	ft	Surface
12/30	2,000	6,562	concrete

Statistics (2021)
- Passengers: 5,811
- Aircraft movements: 241
- Source: Flightstats

Ejin Banner Taolai Airport
- Simplified Chinese: 额济纳旗桃来机场
- Traditional Chinese: 額濟納旗桃來機場
Transcriptions
Standard Mandarin
- Hanyu Pinyin: Éjìnà Qí Táolái Jīchǎng

Ejina Banner Taolai Airport (IATA: EJN, ICAO: ZBEN) is a regional airport serving Ejin Banner in Inner Mongolia, China.

== Overview ==
Taolai Airport is one of the three airports of Alxa League in western Inner Mongolia, the other two being Alxa Left Banner Bayanhot Airport and Alxa Right Banner Badanjilin Airport. The three airports form a commuter airport network that connects the three banners of Alxa League, which covers a vast area (272,000 square kilometres (105,000 sq mi)) of the Gobi Desert.

Construction for the airports started in August 2012, with a total investment of 389.5 million yuan, and all three airports opened on 17 December 2013. All three airports are classified 3C, suitable for 50-seat aircraft such as the Xian MA60. Taolai Airport is projected to handle 80,000 passengers annually by 2020, compared with 250,000 for Bayanhot and 45,000 for Badanjilin.

== See also ==
- List of airports in China
- List of the busiest airports in China
