= Qinyuan County =

Coordinates: 36°30′02″N 112°20′19″E

Qinyuan County 沁源县 Chinyuan; Chinyüan
- County
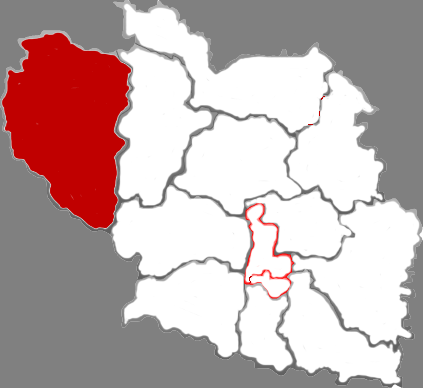

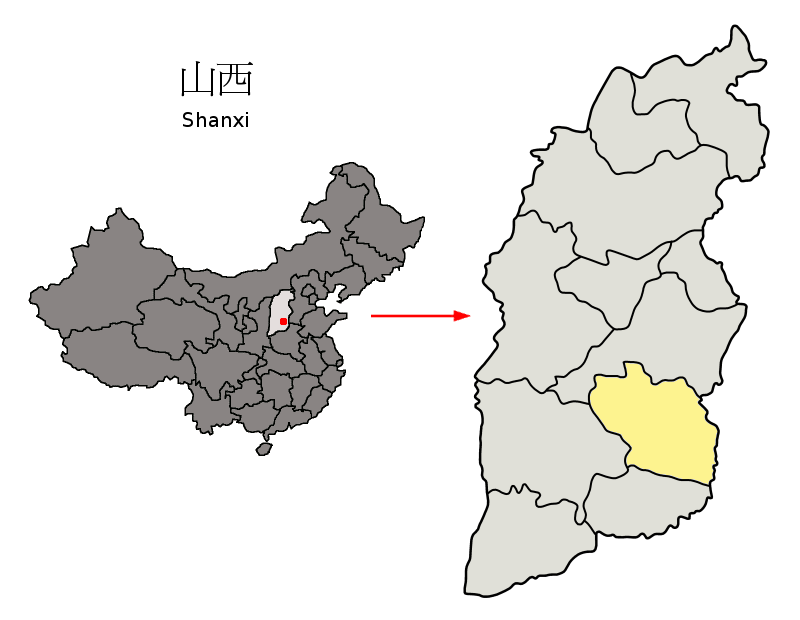
- Country: People's Republic of China
- Province: Shanxi
- Prefecture-level city: Changzhi
- Time zone: UTC+8 (China Standard)

Qinyuan County (Chinese: 沁源县; pinyin: Qìnyuán Xiàn) is a county in the south-central part of Shanxi province, China. It is the westernmost county-level division of Changzhi City.

== Climate ==
Climate data for Qinyuan, elevation 1,000 m (3,300 ft), (1991–2020 normals, extremes 1981–present)
Month	Jan	Feb	Mar	Apr	May	Jun	Jul	Aug	Sep	Oct	Nov	Dec	Year
Record high °C (°F)	16.5 (61.7)	21.5 (70.7)	27.4 (81.3)	33.2 (91.8)	36.5 (97.7)	35.3 (95.5)	36.4 (97.5)	35.0 (95.0)	34.5 (94.1)	29.1 (84.4)	23.2 (73.8)	17.8 (64.0)	36.5 (97.7)
Mean daily maximum °C (°F)	3.2 (37.8)	6.9 (44.4)	12.9 (55.2)	19.9 (67.8)	24.8 (76.6)	28.3 (82.9)	28.9 (84.0)	27.4 (81.3)	23.1 (73.6)	17.8 (64.0)	10.8 (51.4)	4.4 (39.9)	17.4 (63.2)
Daily mean °C (°F)	−5.9 (21.4)	−1.9 (28.6)	4.2 (39.6)	11.1 (52.0)	16.4 (61.5)	20.3 (68.5)	22.2 (72.0)	20.8 (69.4)	15.7 (60.3)	9.4 (48.9)	2.2 (36.0)	−4.3 (24.3)	9.2 (48.5)
Mean daily minimum °C (°F)	−12.4 (9.7)	−8.1 (17.4)	−2.5 (27.5)	3.7 (38.7)	8.9 (48.0)	13.7 (56.7)	17.3 (63.1)	16.2 (61.2)	10.7 (51.3)	3.7 (38.7)	−3.5 (25.7)	−10.3 (13.5)	3.1 (37.6)
Record low °C (°F)	−27.7 (−17.9)	−25.8 (−14.4)	−16.9 (1.6)	−7.3 (18.9)	−1.2 (29.8)	3.8 (38.8)	8.9 (48.0)	7.4 (45.3)	−2.4 (27.7)	−11.0 (12.2)	−23.1 (−9.6)	−27.5 (−17.5)	−27.7 (−17.9)
Average precipitation mm (inches)	5.4 (0.21)	8.7 (0.34)	14.3 (0.56)	31.4 (1.24)	42.1 (1.66)	75.3 (2.96)	152.3 (6.00)	115.4 (4.54)	76.6 (3.02)	39.9 (1.57)	19.2 (0.76)	4.0 (0.16)	584.6 (23.02)
Average precipitation days (≥ 0.1 mm)	3.3	3.9	4.9	6.0	7.6	10.8	14.3	12.0	9.5	6.8	4.7	3.0	86.8
Average snowy days	4.2	5.1	3.3	0.7	0	0	0	0	0	0.1	2.5	3.7	19.6
Average relative humidity (%)	56	54	50	51	55	63	75	78	76	69	64	58	62
Mean monthly sunshine hours	176.0	171.5	203.0	228.7	252.1	225.6	203.7	195.5	175.1	182.8	172.7	176.5	2,363.2
Percentage possible sunshine	57	56	54	58	58	52	46	47	48	53	57	59	54
Source: China Meteorological Administration

== See also ==
- 2026 Liushenyu coal mine explosion
