= Rock Paintings of Mandela Mountains =

Petroglyphs of Mandelashan
- Periods: Neolithic to Qing dynasty
- Location: Mandela Mountains, Inner Mongolia

Site notes
- Discovered: March 1986

Rock Paintings of Mandela Mountains (simplified Chinese: 曼德拉山岩画; traditional Chinese: 曼德拉山岩畫; pinyin: Màndélāshān Yánhuà), also known as Mandela Mountains' Rock Paintings or Rock Paintings Group of Mandela Mountains (曼德拉山岩画群), are images carved into the Mandela Mountains (曼德拉山), covering an area of 18 square kilometers, with over 6,000 paintings.

Rock Paintings of Mandela Mountains, reputed to be the "living fossil of the art world" (美术世界活化石), spans from the Neolithic to Qing dynasty and cover hunting, grazing, sun, moon and stars.

== Discovery ==
In March 1986, the Rock Paintings Group of Mandela Mountains was discovered for the first time in the entire banner cultural relics survey by the Alxa Right Banner Cultural Relics Management Institute (阿拉善右旗文物管理所).

== Creation periods ==
The creation period of Mandela Mountains' Rock Paintings can be divided into five periods, namely, the Neolithic, Bronze Age, Northern dynasty to Tang dynasty, Western Xia, and Yuan dynasty, Ming dynasty and Qing dynasty.

== Conservations ==
Rock Paintings of Mandela Mountains was included in the list of cultural relics protection of Alashan League in 1987 and was listed as a provincial cultural relics protection unit in Inner Mongolia in 1996. In 2013, it was included in the seventh batch of the list of Major Historical and Cultural Site Protected at the National Level in China.
