= Economy of Shanxi =

Economy of Shanxi Province, China

- Location of Shanxi in China
- Currency: Chinese yuan (CNY, ¥)
- Fiscal year: 2024

Statistics
- GDP by sector: Mining, metallurgy, energy, manufacturing, agriculture, tourism, services
- Main industries: Coal mining, metallurgy, chemicals, machinery, power generation, information technology

External
- Exports: Mobile phones, steel products, photovoltaic panels, coal
- All values, unless otherwise stated, are in US dollars.

The economy of Shanxi is dominated by heavy industry, especially coal mining, metallurgy, power generation and chemical production. Due to its strategic position in North China and vast mineral resources, Shanxi has long been one of the most important energy bases of the People's Republic of China. In recent decades, the province has also developed manufacturing, logistics, information technology, tourism and modern services.

== Services ==
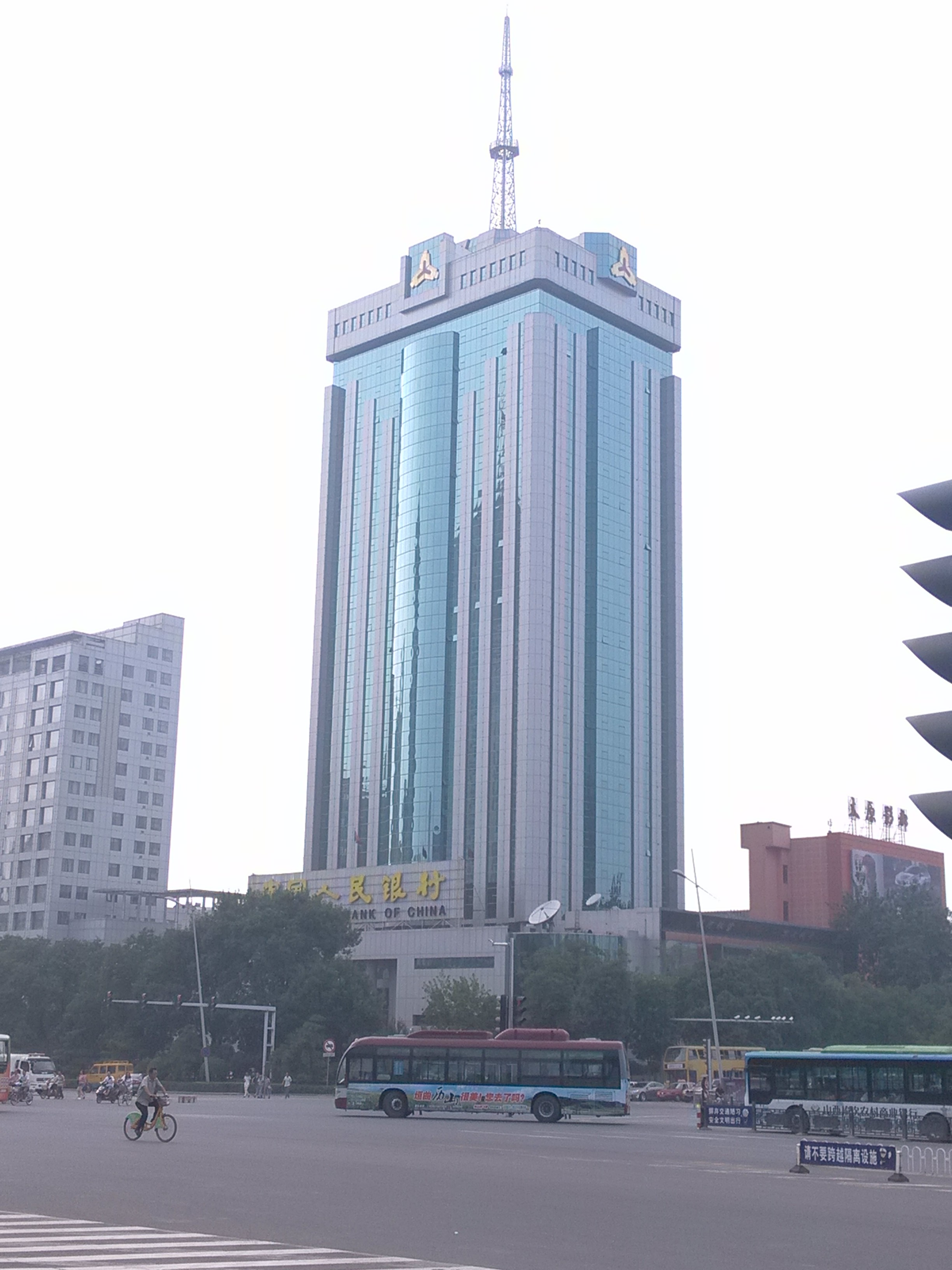
Office of the People's Bank of China in Taiyuan

The service sector plays an important role in the economy of Shanxi, including banking, insurance, retail trade, catering, tourism, hospitality, and repair services for automobiles, motorcycles, bicycles and household appliances. Since the 2010s, Shanxi has actively developed the digital economy and information technology, especially sectors such as 5G, big data, artificial intelligence, digital media and the video game industry.

=== Retail ===
Shanxi's retail sector includes major Chinese and international supermarket, hypermarket and department store chains such as Carrefour, Walmart, ParknShop, Yonghui Superstores, Wanda Group, Wangfujing Department Store, Parkson and the local supermarket chain Tangjiu.

Since the 1990s, large shopping malls combining retail, restaurants and entertainment have rapidly developed in major cities, while rural areas continue to be dominated by cooperative stores and small family shops.

Major shopping centers are located in Taiyuan, Datong, Jinzhong, Jincheng, Changzhi, Yangquan, Yuncheng and Xinzhou. In Taiyuan, the principal pedestrian shopping street is Liuxiang Street, visited daily by more than 200,000 people. It contains one of the largest night markets in North China, as well as numerous restaurants, cafes, clothing stores, textile shops, shoe stores, cosmetics retailers, jewelry stores and souvenir shops.

Foreign trade is also important to the provincial economy. Major exports include mobile phones, steel products, photovoltaic panels and coal.

=== Construction ===
The province's largest construction companies are the state-owned Shanxi Construction Investment Group and Shanxi Construction Engineering Group, both headquartered in Taiyuan.

=== Telecommunications ===
All major Chinese mobile operators and internet providers operate in Shanxi, including China Mobile, China Telecom and China Unicom. By the end of 2022, the province had 67,000 5G base stations, increasing to 84,000 by August 2023.

=== Information technology ===
The city of Shuozhou hosts a big data center and research center for the BeiDou Navigation Satellite System. Yangquan hosts innovation centers operated by Baidu and Huiquan Big Data.

=== Tourism ===
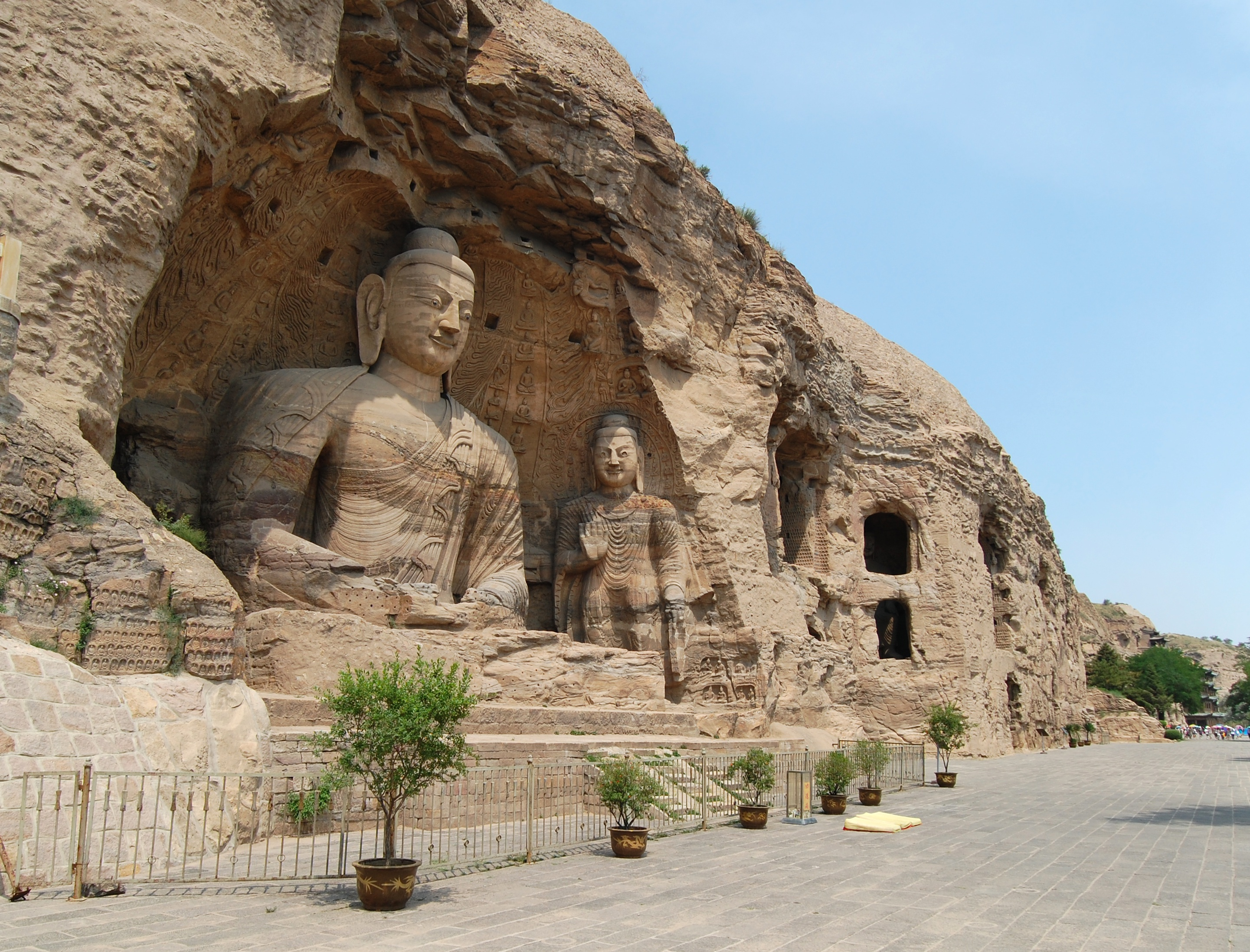
Yungang Grottoes

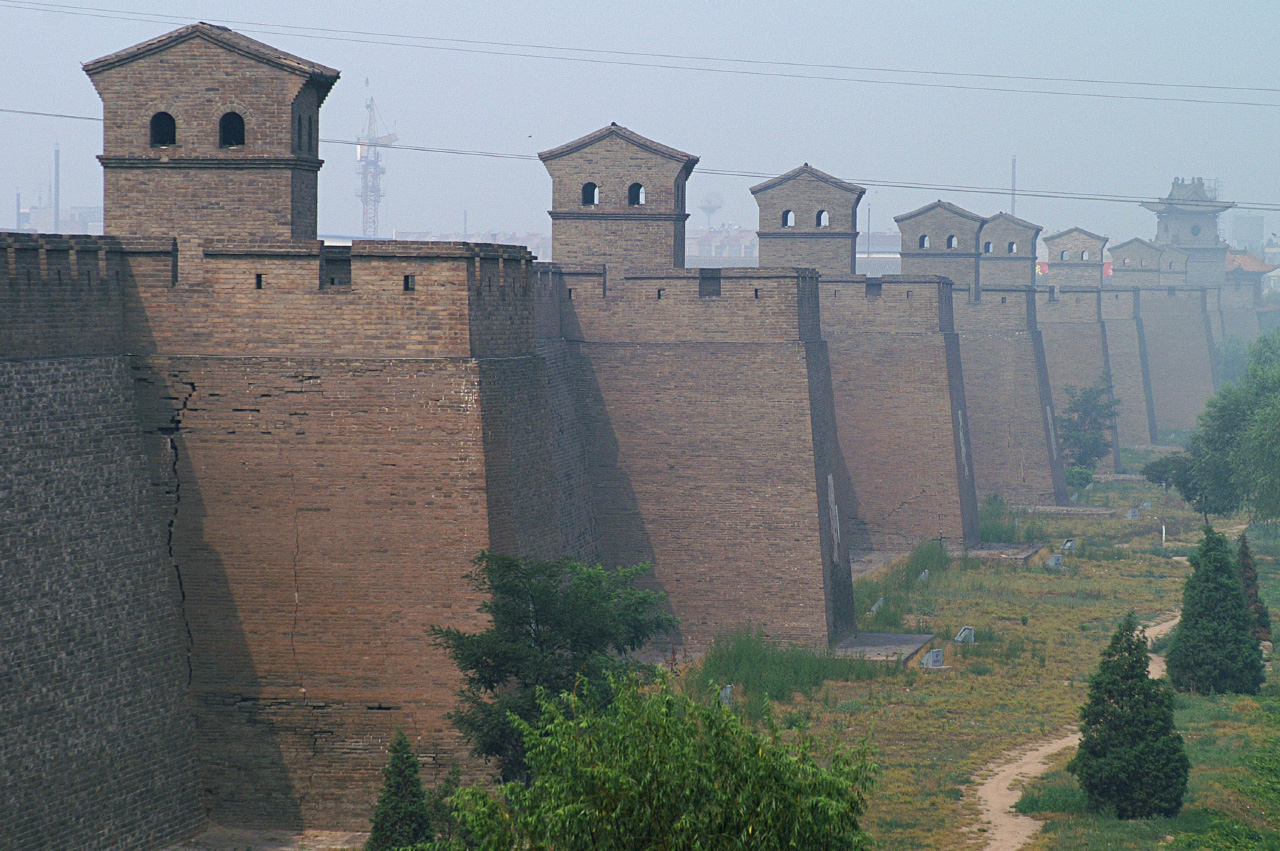
City wall of Pingyao

As one of the cradles of Chinese civilization, Shanxi possesses many important historical, cultural and natural sites. The province contains 452 nationally protected cultural heritage sites and more than 28,000 ancient architectural sites of provincial or county significance, more than any other province in China.

In 2017, domestic tourists recorded 560 million overnight stays in Shanxi, while foreign tourists recorded 670,000 overnight stays. Revenue from domestic tourism reached 533.86 billion yuan, while international tourism generated US$350 million.

International and Chinese hotel chains operating in Taiyuan, Datong and other cities include InterContinental, Kempinski, Hyatt, Marriott International, Pullman Hotels and Resorts, Mercure Hotels, Howard Johnson, Wanda Vista, JI Hotel, Metropolo and Vienna Hotels.

== Agriculture ==
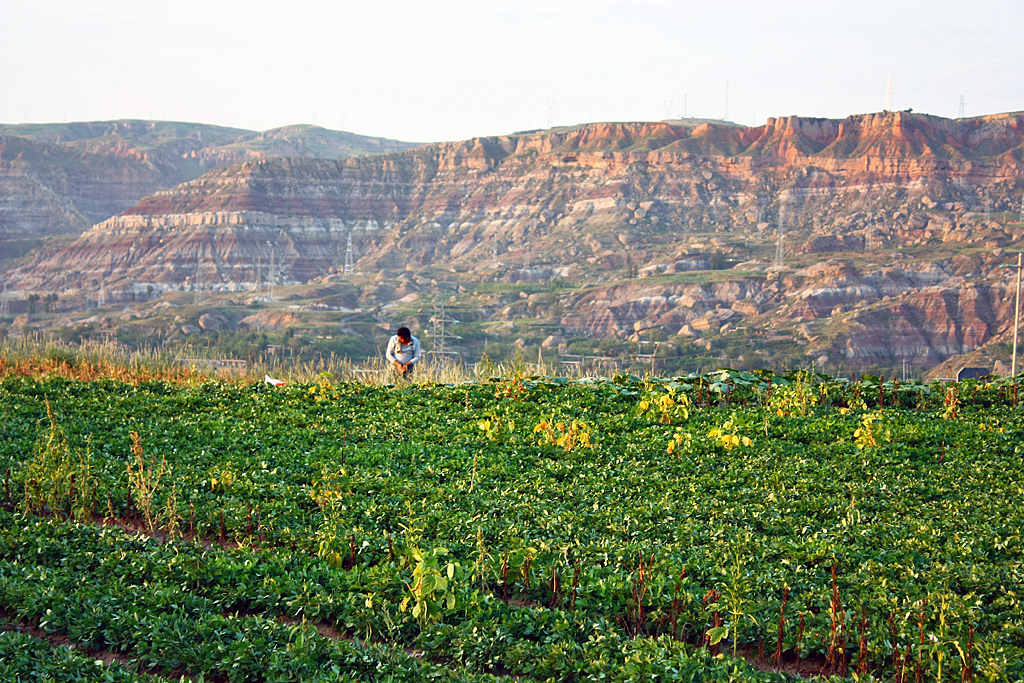
Farm in Shanxi

In 2023, the province's cultivated land area reached 47.4 million mu, grain output totaled 14.78 million tonnes, and average yield per mu reached 311.75 kilograms.

== Science and education ==
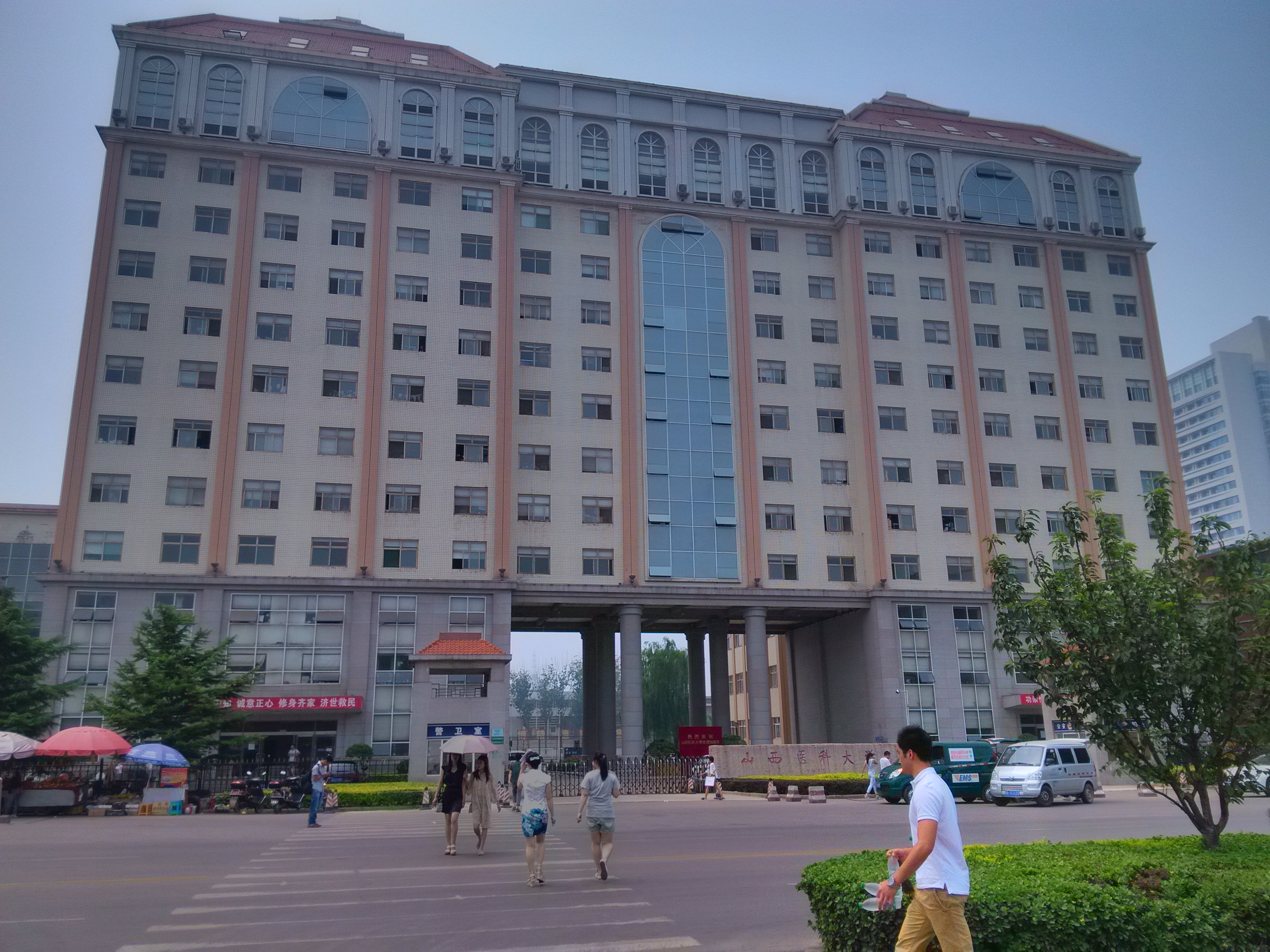
Shanxi Medical University

Shanxi possesses significant scientific and educational resources. Major educational and research centers include:

- Taiyuan — North University of China, Shanxi University, Taiyuan University of Science and Technology, Taiyuan University of Technology, Shanxi Medical University, Shanxi University of Traditional Chinese Medicine, Shanxi University of Finance and Economics.
- Datong — Datong University.
- Taigu District — Shanxi Agricultural University.
- Yuncheng — Yuncheng University.

== Industrial parks and development zones ==
Shanxi contains 86 development zones with a combined area of 7,186 square kilometres, including industrial development zones, agricultural development zones and eco-cultural tourism zones.

== See also ==
- Economy of China
- Shanxi
- Coal in China

== Bibliography ==
- Guo, Rongxing (2013). Regional China: A Business and Economic Handbook. London: Palgrave Macmillan. ISBN 9781137287687.
