= Alxa Left Banner mine collapse =

2023 mining disaster in China

2023 Inner Mongolia open-pit mine collapse
- Alxa Left Banner mine collapse (China)
- Date: 22 February 2023
- Time: 13:16 (BJT, UTC+8)
- Location: Alxa Left Banner, Inner Mongolia, China; 37°58′11″N 105°39′23″E
- Type: Mining accident
- Deaths: 53
- Injuries: 6

At 13:16 on 22 February 2023, a serious collapse occurred in Xinjing Coal Industry Open pit Coal Mine (Chinese: 阿拉善左旗露天煤矿坍塌事故) in Alxa Left Banner, Inner Mongolia, causing 53 people to "lose contact or die". Six others were injured.

== Casualties ==
Two people were initially confirmed dead with 53 regarded as missing. In March, state operated China Central Television indirectly confirmed that all remaining trapped miners were "missing or dead". In June, it indirectly confirmed that they were all dead, bringing the death toll to 53.

== Reactions ==
The company's main shareholder, Chen Fenggan, claimed that he had no liability for what happened. He was later compelled under pressure from the media and outraged public to issue another statement.

Investigations found that the accident was a result of illegal construction and production of the coal mine, reckless operation of the contracting construction company, and oversight by local party committees, governments, and departments.

After the incident, the Ministry of Emergency Management called for comprehensive inspections and rectifications to be conducted to root out the major hidden safety hazards in key sectors and fields.

== See also ==
YouTube CCTV News footage of event
