= Rock Paintings of Helan Mountains =

Petroglyphs of Helan Mountains
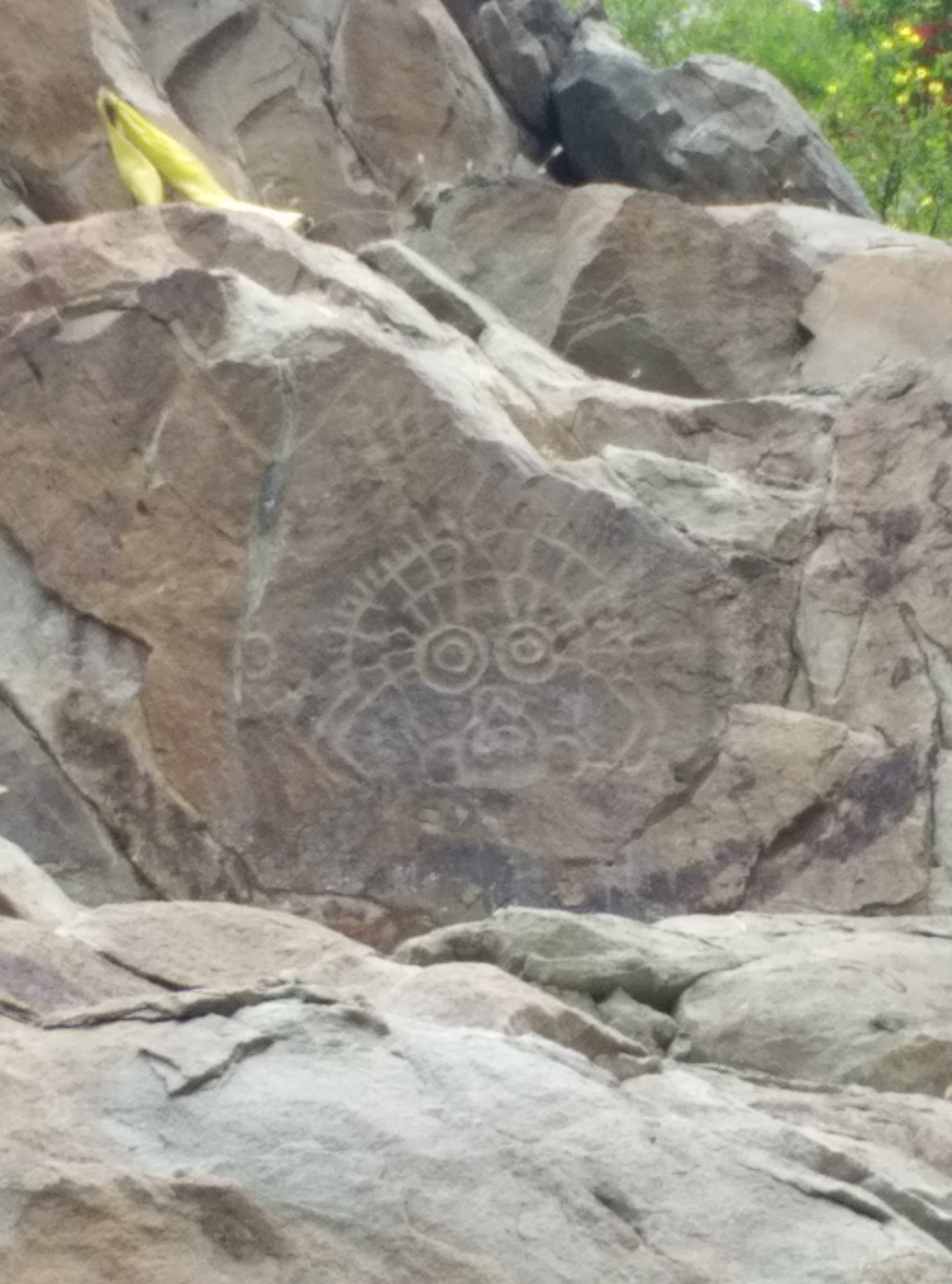
- Interactive map of Petroglyphs of Helan Mountains
- Periods: Neolithic to Western Xia
- Location: Helanshan, Ningxia

Site notes
- Discovered: 5th century AD

Rock Paintings of Helan Mountains (simplified Chinese: 贺兰山岩画; traditional Chinese: 賀蘭山岩畫; pinyin: Hèlánshān Yánhuà), also known as Helanshan Rock Art, are images carved into the rocks of Helan Mountains, Ningxia.

Helanshan Rock Art is representative of rock paintings in northern China, with rich and concentrated subject matter. As of December 2020, tens of thousands of petroglyphs have been discovered, and they were created between 10,000 and 3,000 years ago.

== Discoveries ==
The Helanshan Rock Art was first discovered by Li Daoyuan, a geographer of the Northern Wei dynasty, in the 5th century AD in Commentary on the Water Classic. In modern times, it was rediscovered by Li Xiangshi (李祥石) in 1969.

The truly comprehensive and systematic studies and findings of Helanshan Rock Art have been made since China's reform and opening up.

== Creation periods ==
The creation periods of Helanshan Rock Art can be roughly divided into three stages, the first stage is the Neolithic, the second stage is from the Qin dynasty to the Northern and Southern dynasties, and the third stage is from the Sui dynasty to the Western Xia.

== Conservations ==
In 1996, Helanshan Rock Art was included in the third batch of the list of Major Historical and Cultural Site Protected at the National Level in China. In 1997, it was inscribed on the Unofficial List of World Cultural Heritage (非正式世界文化遗产名录) by the International Petroglyph Committee of UNESCO (联合国教科文组织国际岩画委员会).
