= Guangzong Temple (Inner Mongolia) =

Buddhist temple in Inner Mongolia, China

- 广宗寺
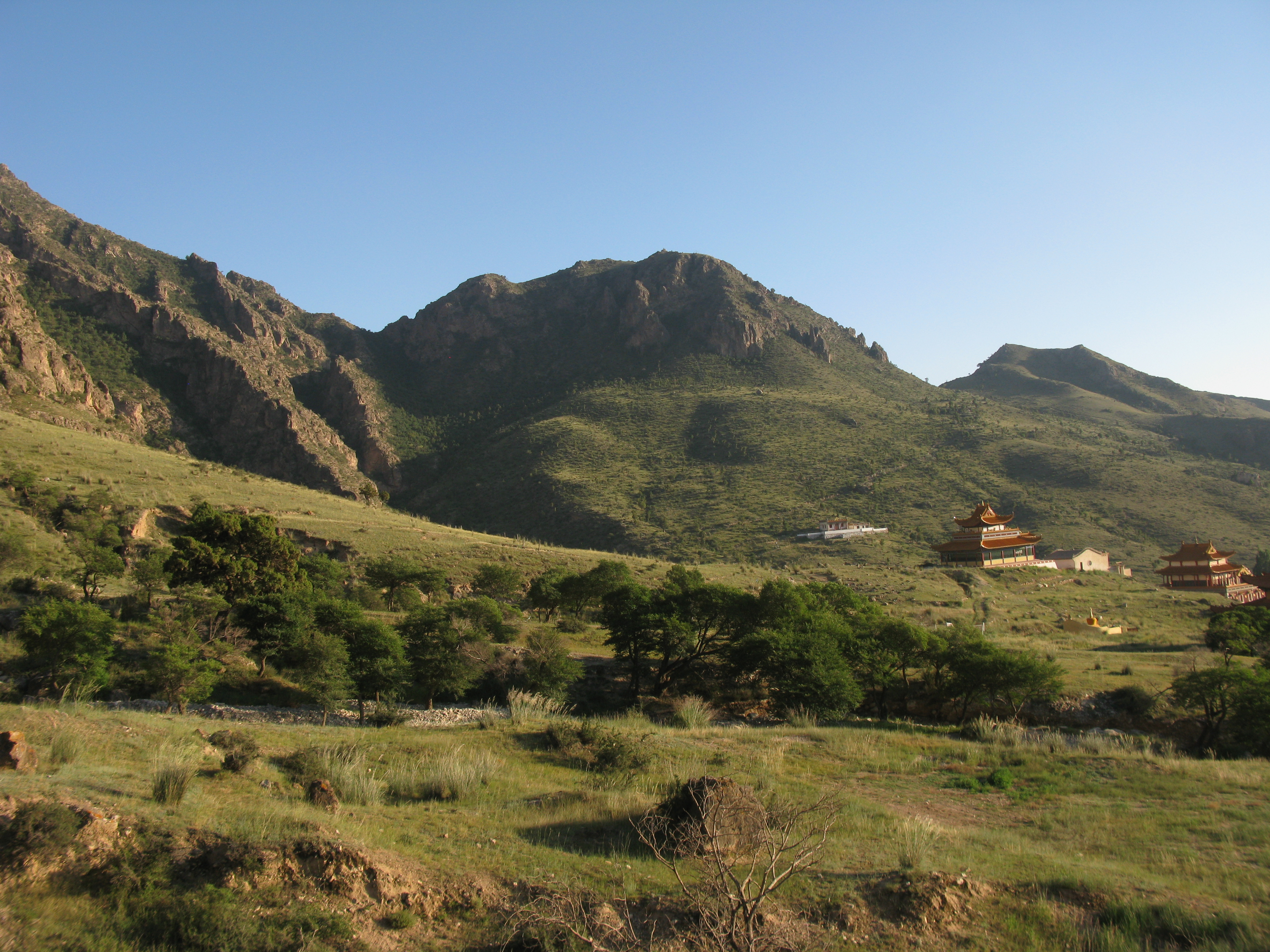
- Guangzong Temple in July 2010.

- Location within Inner Mongolia

Religion
- Affiliation: Buddhism
- Deity: Tibetan Buddhism (Gelug)
- Leadership: Living Buddha Jialasen (贾拉森)

Location
- Location: Bieli Town, Alxa Left Banner, Inner Mongolia
- Country: China
- Interactive map of Guangzong Temple
- Coordinates: 38°40′09″N 105°48′50″E

Architecture
- Style: Chinese architecture
- Founder: Ahwang Duoerji (阿旺多尔济)
- Established: 1757
- Completed: 1981 (reconstruction)
- Demolished: 1971

Guangzong Temple (simplified Chinese: 广宗寺; traditional Chinese: 廣宗寺; pinyin: Guǎngzōng Sì), more commonly known as the Southern Temple (南寺), is a Buddhist temple located in Bieli Town of Alxa Left Banner, Inner Mongolia, China.

== History ==
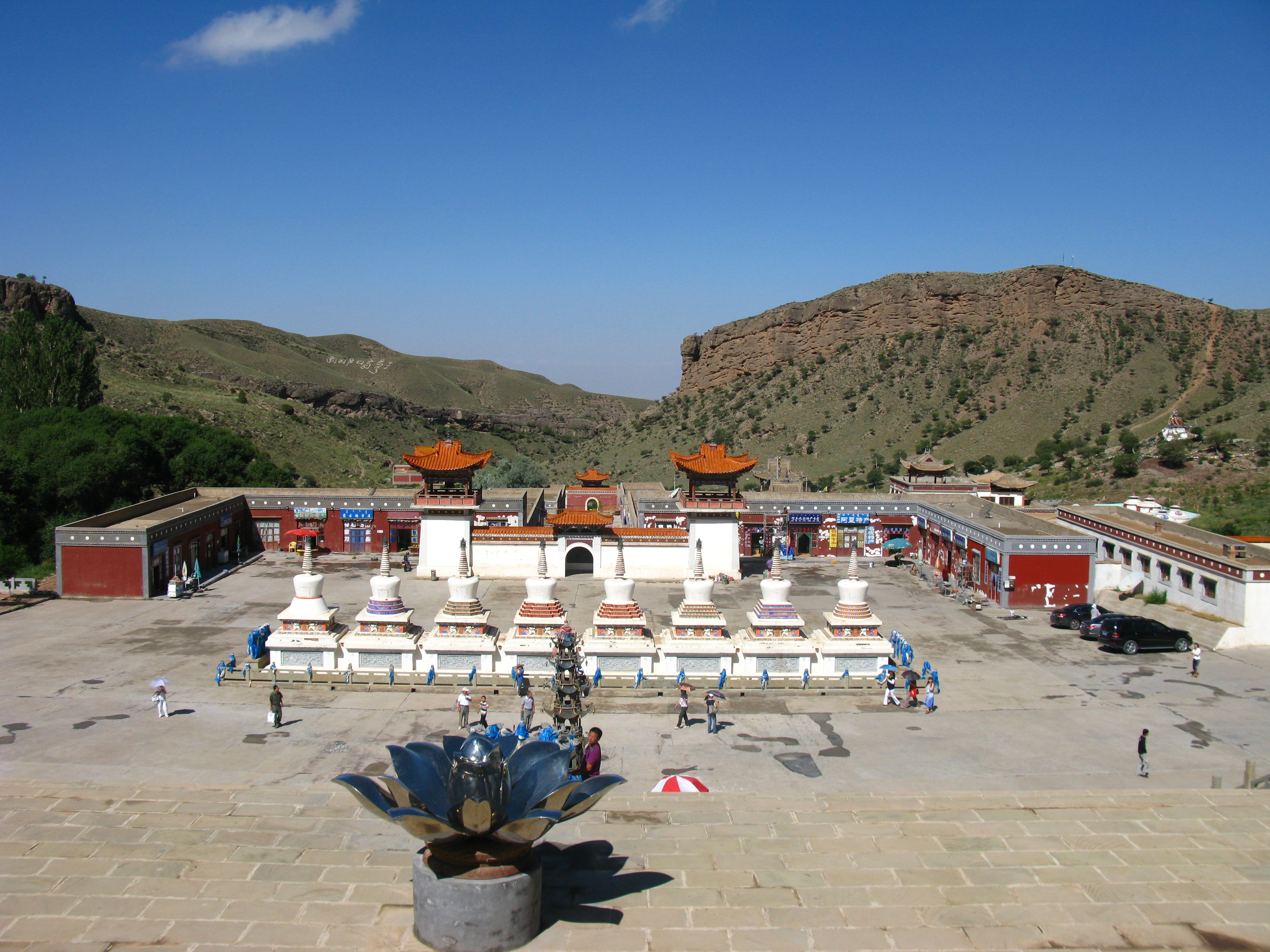
Guangzong Temple in July 2010.

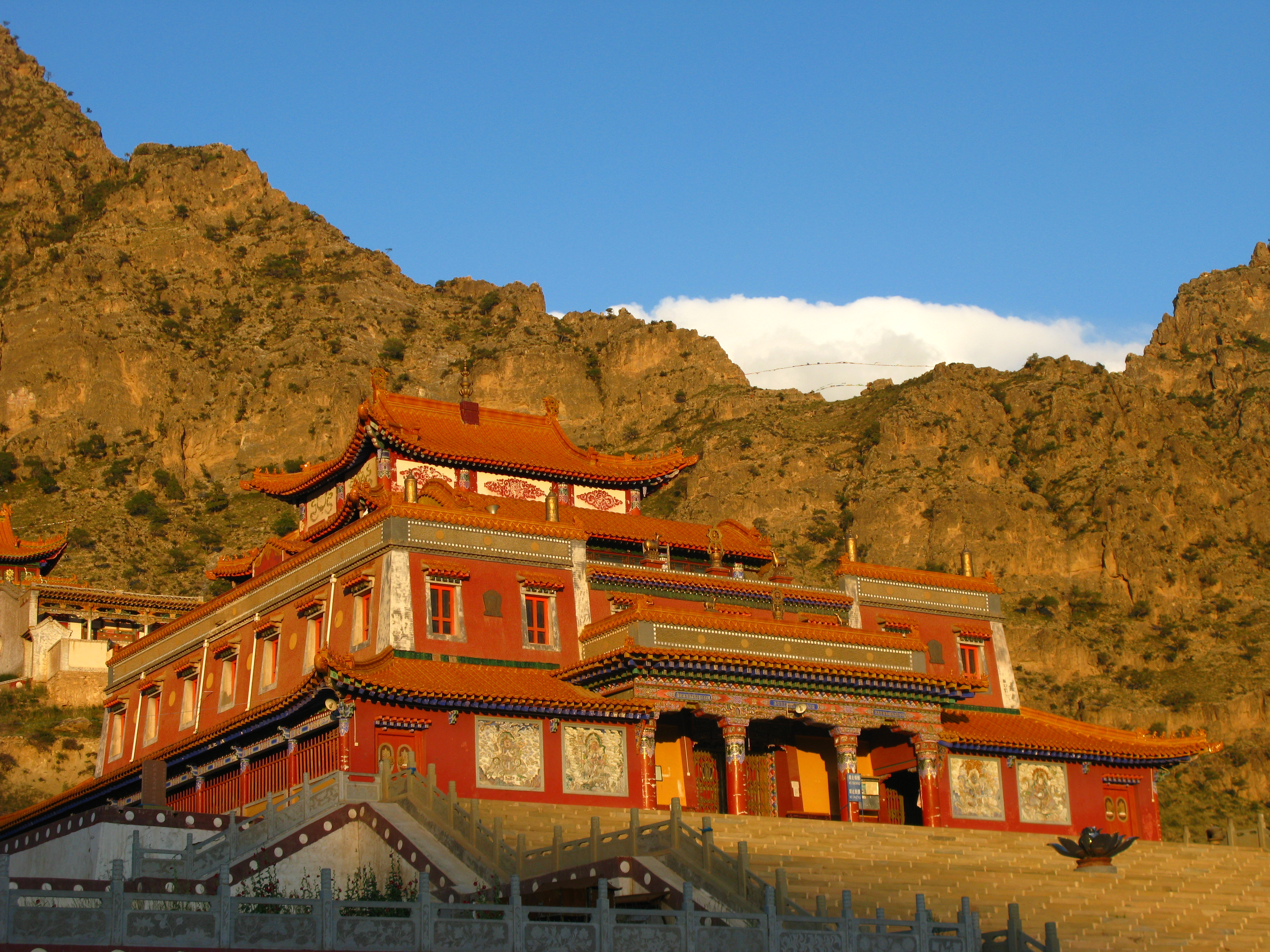
A grand hall at Guangzong Temple.

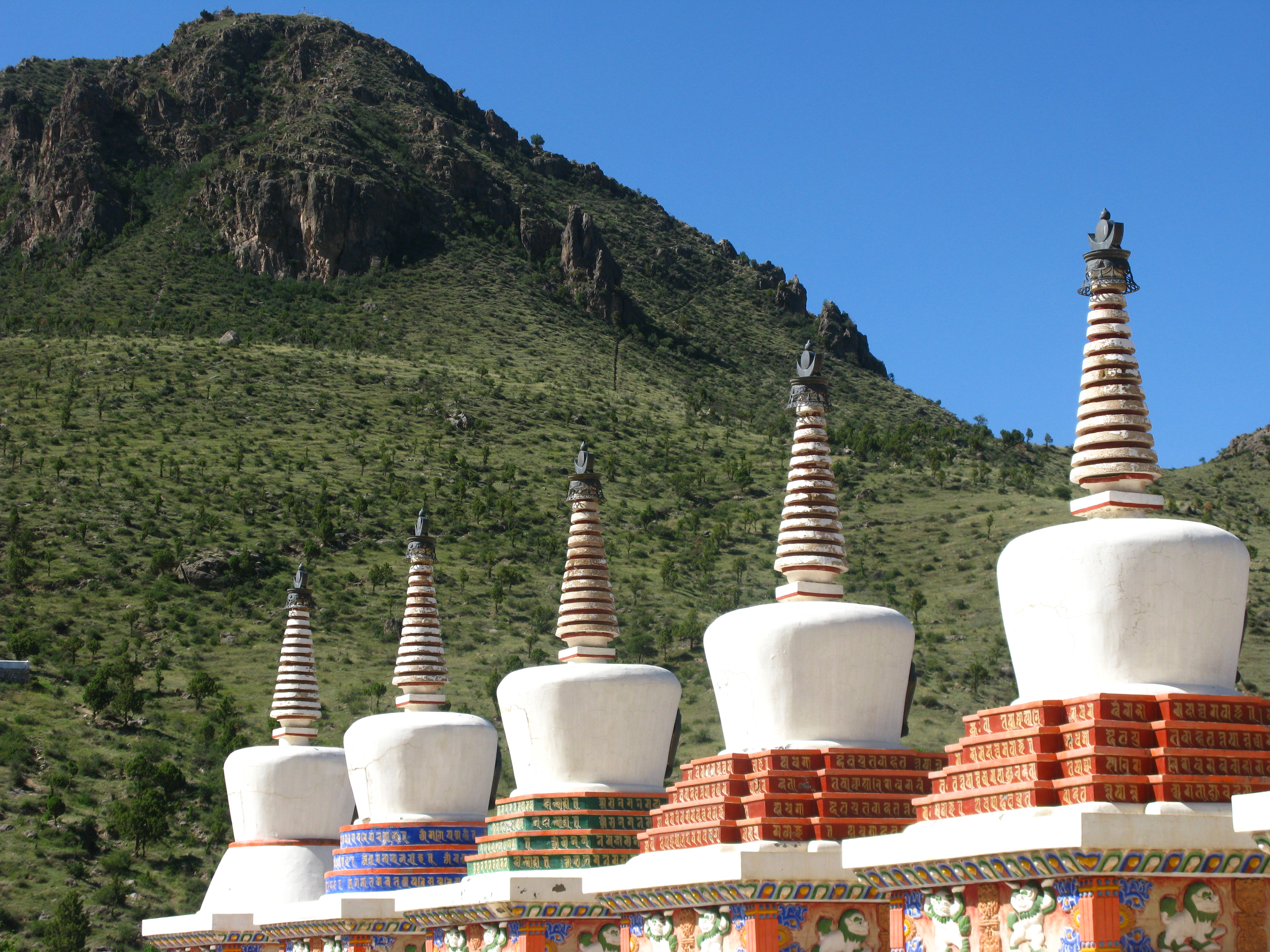
Stupas at Guangzong Temple.

=== Qing dynasty ===
Guangzong Temple was first built by Ahwang Duoerji (阿旺多尔济), a disciple of the 6th Dalai Lama, in 1757, in the reign of Qianlong Emperor (1736–1795) the Qing dynasty (1644–1911). It initially called "Ahda Ximai Deli Temple" (阿大西迈德里庙). The body of the 6th Dalai Lama was preserved in the temple. Three years later, Qianlong Emperor inscribed and honored the name "Guangzong Temple" (广宗寺) in Mongolian, Chinese, Tibetan and Manchu. In the ruling of Daoguang Emperor (1821–1850), the temple was largely extended. In 1869, in the Tongzhi period (1862–1874), Guangzong Temple was completely destroyed by heartless flames of war, only the Kalachakra Hall (时轮殿) and Vajrayogini Hall (金刚亥母殿) survived. Guangzong Temple was restored and redecorated in the Guangxu period (1875–1908).

=== People's Republic of China ===
In 1966, Mao Zedong launched the Cultural Revolution, the Red Guards had attacked Guangzong Temple, volumes of sutras, historical documents, and other works of art were either removed, damaged or destroyed in the ten-year movement. And the body of the 6th Dalai Lama was burned down by the Red Guards. In 1971, Guangzong Temple was dismantled and the temple fell into ruins.

After the 3rd Plenary Session of the 11th Central Committee of the Chinese Communist Party, according to the national policy of free religious belief, regular scripture lectures, meditation and other features of temple life were resumed in Yanfu Temple. In 1981, 15 halls and rooms were restored in the ruins. The ashes of the 6th Dalai Lama were enshrined in a newly established stupa.

In 1991, the Main Assembly Hall (大经堂) and the Bstankhang Hall (赞康殿) were consecrated by the Living Buddha Jialasen (贾拉森). Ten year later, the Yellow Hall (黄楼庙) was restored, sariras of the 6th Dalai Lama were preserved in the hall.

== Architecture ==
Guangzong Temple is situated in the west hillside of Helan Mountains and consists of over 20 halls and rooms, the existing main buildings include Main Assembly Hall, Mahavira Hall and Yellow Hall.
