= Bayanhot =

Town in Inner Mongolia, China

Bayanhot 巴彦浩特镇
- Town

Mongolian transcription(s)
  - Mongolian: ᠪᠠᠶᠠᠨᠬᠣᠲᠠ ᠪᠠᠯᠭᠠᠰᠤ
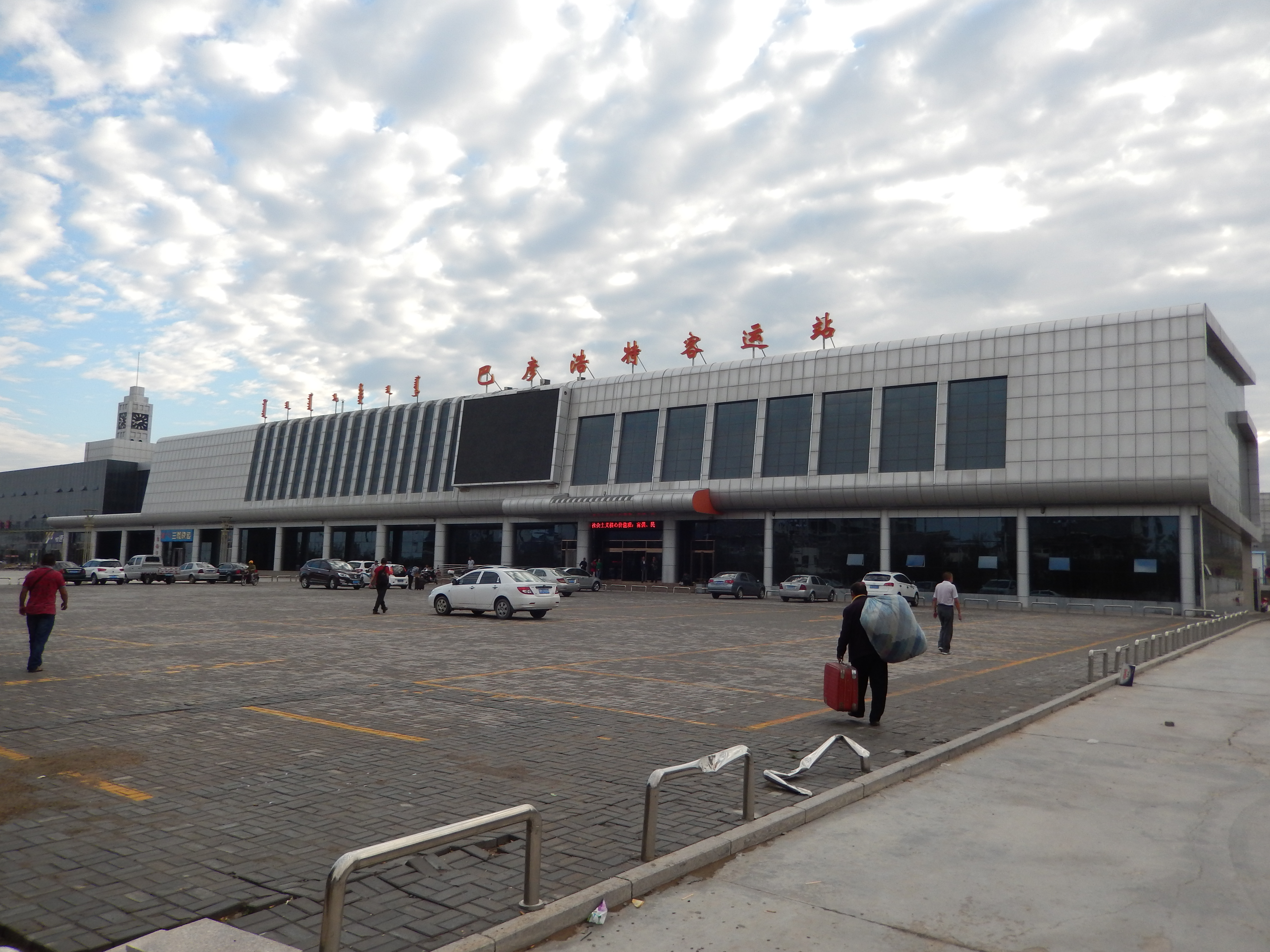
- Bayanhot bus station
- Interactive map of Bayanhot
- Coordinates: 38°50′16″N 105°41′43″E
- Country: China
- Autonomous Region: Inner Mongolia
- Banner: Alxa Left Banner

Area
  - Town: 5,433.8 km^{2} (2,098.0 sq mi)
  - Urban: 32 km^{2} (12 sq mi)
- Elevation: 1,450 m (4,760 ft)

Population (2010)
  - Town: 94,445

Bayanhot is a town in Alxa Left Banner, Inner Mongolia, China. It is the largest town of Alxa League. Its name originates from Mongolian meaning 'rich town'. It was formerly known as Dingyuanying (定远营镇) or Wang Ye Fu. In 2010 the population was 94,445.

The town is bordered by the Helan Mountains in the east and by the Tengger Desert in the west.

The town was established in 1730 as Dingyuanying and renamed to Bayanhot in 1952. It has historically been supplied from nearby Yinchuan, and still retains good transport links with the capital of Ningxia.

The Alxa Baraghun Hiid, a large Mongol Buddhist monastery was destroyed during the Cultural Revolution but rebuilt in 2001. The Yanfu Buddhist temple has survived as one of the old Mongol town landmarks.
