= Alxa Right Banner =

Alxa Right Banner 阿拉善右旗 • ᠠᠯᠠᠱᠠ ᠪᠠᠷᠠᠭᠤᠨ ᠬᠣᠰᠢᠭᠤ
- Banner
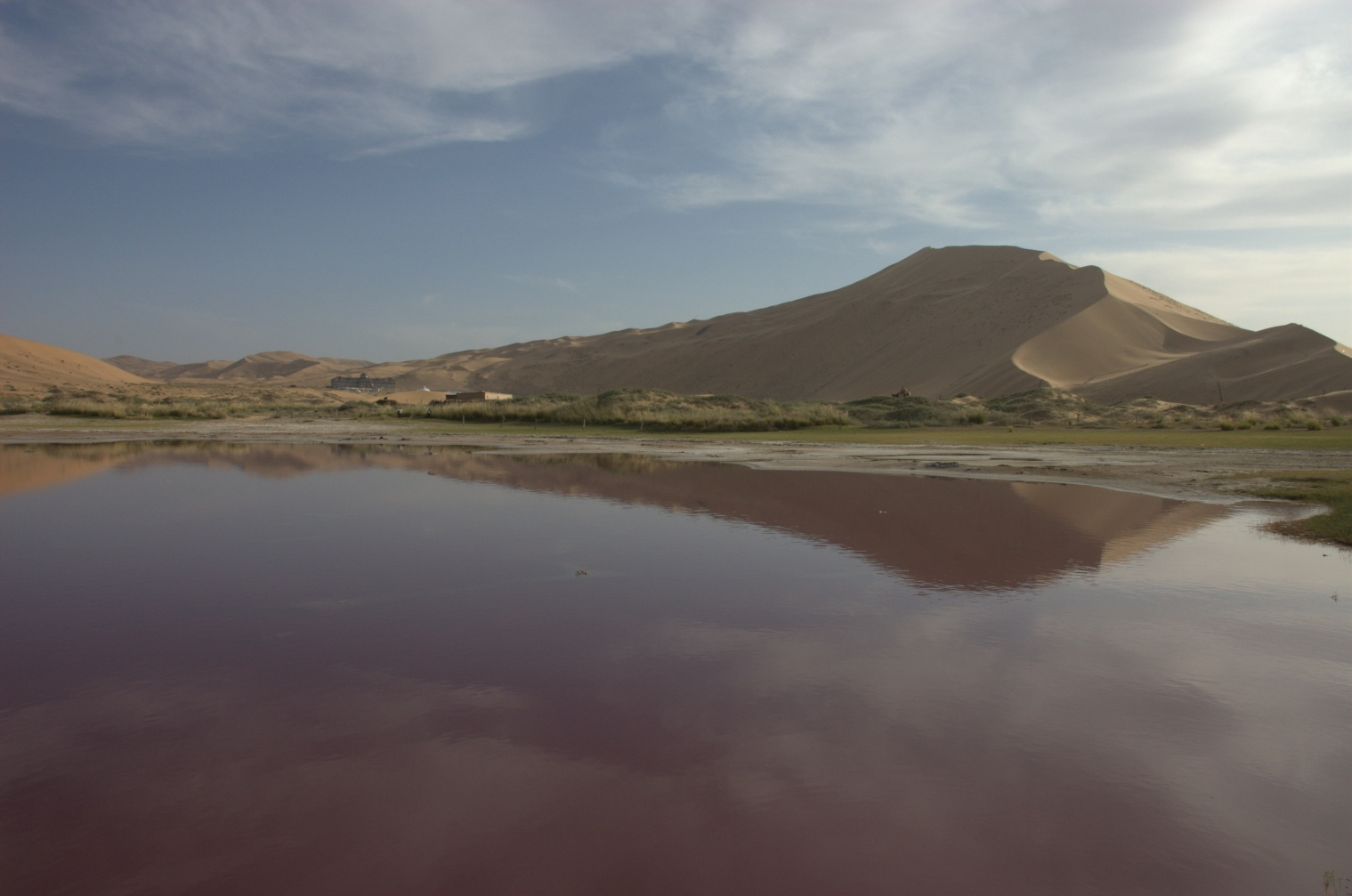
- Sand dunes in the Badain Jaran Desert

- Location of the seat in Inner Mongolia Alxa Right (China)
- Coordinates: 39°13′19″N 101°40′12″E
- Country: China
- Autonomous region: Inner Mongolia
- League: Alxa
- Banner seat: Badain Jaran

Area
  - Total: 71,515.26 km^{2} (27,612.20 sq mi)

Population (2020)
  - Total: 22,647
  - Density: 0.31667/km^{2} (0.82018/sq mi)
- Time zone: UTC+8 (China Standard)
- Website: www.alsyq.gov.cn

Alxa Right Banner

Chinese name
- Chinese: 阿拉善右旗
Transcriptions
Standard Mandarin
- Hanyu Pinyin: Ālāshàn Yòu Qí

Mongolian name
- Mongolian Cyrillic: Алшаа баруун хошуу
- Mongolian script: ᠠᠯᠠᠱᠠ ᠪᠠᠷᠠᠭᠤᠨ ᠬᠣᠰᠢᠭᠤ
Transcriptions
- SASM/GNC: Alaša Baraɣun qosiɣu

Alxa Right Banner (Mongolian: ᠠᠯᠠᠱᠠ ᠪᠠᠷᠠᠭᠤᠨ ᠬᠣᠰᠢᠭᠤ; Chinese: 阿拉善右旗) is a banner in the southwest of Inner Mongolia, China, bordering Gansu province to the south and southwest. It is under the administration of Alxa League. The banner is served by the Alxa Right Banner Badanjilin Airport.

== Demographics ==
The proportion of nationalities in Alxa Right Banner (2020)
Nationality	Percentage
Han	72.3%
Mongols	26.2%
Manchus	0.3%
Hui People	0.2%
Tu People	0.1%
Tibetans	0.1%
Dongxiangs	0.1%
Tujia	0.1%
Others	0.6%
Source of the population statistics :

== Administrative divisions ==
Alxa Right Banner is divided into 3 towns and 4 sums.

Name	Simplified Chinese	Hanyu Pinyin	Mongolian (Hudum Script)	Mongolian (Cyrillic)	Administrative division code
Towns
Badain Jaran Town	巴丹吉林镇	Bādānjílín Zhèn	ᠪᠠᠳᠠᠢ ᠶᠢᠨ ᠵᠢᠷᠠᠨ ᠪᠠᠯᠭᠠᠰᠤ	Бадайн жаран балгас	152922103
Yabrai Town	雅布赖镇	Yǎbùlài Zhèn	ᠶᠠᠪᠠᠷᠠᠢ ᠪᠠᠯᠭᠠᠰᠤ	Яврай балгас	152922104
Altan Obo Town	阿拉腾敖包镇	Ālāténg'áobāo Zhèn	ᠠᠯᠲᠠᠨᠣ᠋ᠪᠣᠭ᠎ᠠ ᠪᠠᠯᠭᠠᠰᠤ	Алтан-Овоо балгас	152922105
Sums
Mandal Sum	曼德拉苏木	Màndélā Sūmù	ᠮᠠᠨᠳᠤᠯ ᠰᠤᠮᠤ	Мандал сум	152922211
Altan Qog Sum	阿拉腾朝格苏木	Ālāténgcháogé Sūmù	ᠠᠯᠲᠠᠨᠴᠣᠭ ᠰᠤᠮᠤ	Алтанцог сум	152922212
Bayan Gol Sum	巴彦高勒苏木	Bāyàngāolè Sūmù	ᠪᠠᠶᠠᠨᠭᠣᠣᠯ ᠰᠤᠮᠤ	Баянгол сум	152922213
Tangsag Bulag Sum	塔木素布拉格苏木	Tǎmùsùbùlāgé Sūmù	ᠲᠠᠩᠰᠤᠭᠪᠤᠯᠠᠭ ᠰᠤᠮᠤ	Тамсагбулаг сум	152922214

== Climate ==
Alxa Right Banner has a typical Taklamakan/Gobi cool arid climate (Köppen BWk) characterised by hot summers, freezing winters, large diurnal temperature swings and very little precipitation mostly falling from summer thunderstorms.

Climate data for Alxa Right Banner, elevation 1,510 m (4,950 ft), (1991–2020 normals, extremes 1991–present)
Month	Jan	Feb	Mar	Apr	May	Jun	Jul	Aug	Sep	Oct	Nov	Dec	Year
Record high °C (°F)	15.3 (59.5)	17.8 (64.0)	25.1 (77.2)	33.2 (91.8)	35.2 (95.4)	37.2 (99.0)	41.5 (106.7)	38.2 (100.8)	35.2 (95.4)	28.1 (82.6)	20.7 (69.3)	13.6 (56.5)	41.5 (106.7)
Mean daily maximum °C (°F)	−1.2 (29.8)	3.6 (38.5)	10.5 (50.9)	18.2 (64.8)	24.1 (75.4)	29.0 (84.2)	31.0 (87.8)	29.1 (84.4)	23.3 (73.9)	16.0 (60.8)	7.6 (45.7)	0.4 (32.7)	16.0 (60.7)
Daily mean °C (°F)	−7.8 (18.0)	−3.2 (26.2)	3.8 (38.8)	11.5 (52.7)	17.6 (63.7)	22.9 (73.2)	24.9 (76.8)	23.0 (73.4)	17.3 (63.1)	9.4 (48.9)	0.9 (33.6)	−6.1 (21.0)	9.5 (49.1)
Mean daily minimum °C (°F)	−13.7 (7.3)	−9.4 (15.1)	−2.4 (27.7)	4.9 (40.8)	10.8 (51.4)	16.5 (61.7)	19.0 (66.2)	17.4 (63.3)	11.7 (53.1)	3.4 (38.1)	−4.9 (23.2)	−11.7 (10.9)	3.5 (38.2)
Record low °C (°F)	−28.2 (−18.8)	−27.0 (−16.6)	−17.6 (0.3)	−9.0 (15.8)	−2.0 (28.4)	5.6 (42.1)	11.6 (52.9)	8.4 (47.1)	1.6 (34.9)	−11.7 (10.9)	−21.4 (−6.5)	−27.2 (−17.0)	−28.2 (−18.8)
Average precipitation mm (inches)	1.0 (0.04)	0.4 (0.02)	2.1 (0.08)	5.0 (0.20)	10.2 (0.40)	17.6 (0.69)	31.6 (1.24)	23.4 (0.92)	22.5 (0.89)	6.2 (0.24)	1.1 (0.04)	0.8 (0.03)	121.9 (4.79)
Average precipitation days (≥ 0.1 mm)	1.9	0.9	2.2	2.5	4.2	5.3	7.4	6.6	5.6	2.2	1.6	1.4	41.8
Average snowy days	3.5	2.2	2.6	1.1	0.2	0	0	0	0	1.1	2.6	2.8	16.1
Average relative humidity (%)	46	36	29	25	25	30	37	40	41	36	40	46	36
Mean monthly sunshine hours	242.8	235.8	272.4	288.3	310.5	299.0	295.7	288.5	264.1	274.0	246.5	237.9	3,255.5
Percentage possible sunshine	80	77	73	72	70	67	66	69	72	81	83	82	74
Source: China Meteorological Administration

Climate data for Yabulai Town, Alxa Right Banner, elevation 1,240 m (4,070 ft), (1991–2020 normals)
Month	Jan	Feb	Mar	Apr	May	Jun	Jul	Aug	Sep	Oct	Nov	Dec	Year
Mean daily maximum °C (°F)	−1.1 (30.0)	4.3 (39.7)	11.9 (53.4)	20.0 (68.0)	26.1 (79.0)	31.3 (88.3)	33.2 (91.8)	31.1 (88.0)	25.1 (77.2)	17.4 (63.3)	8.2 (46.8)	0.5 (32.9)	17.3 (63.2)
Daily mean °C (°F)	−9.0 (15.8)	−4.0 (24.8)	3.8 (38.8)	12.3 (54.1)	18.8 (65.8)	24.3 (75.7)	26.4 (79.5)	24.2 (75.6)	18.0 (64.4)	9.5 (49.1)	0.4 (32.7)	−7.1 (19.2)	9.8 (49.6)
Mean daily minimum °C (°F)	−15.5 (4.1)	−11.2 (11.8)	−3.4 (25.9)	4.6 (40.3)	10.6 (51.1)	16.6 (61.9)	19.4 (66.9)	17.7 (63.9)	11.7 (53.1)	2.9 (37.2)	−5.9 (21.4)	−13.4 (7.9)	2.8 (37.1)
Average precipitation mm (inches)	0.5 (0.02)	0.5 (0.02)	1.6 (0.06)	3.6 (0.14)	5.7 (0.22)	12.1 (0.48)	20.6 (0.81)	24.7 (0.97)	14.8 (0.58)	3.8 (0.15)	1.1 (0.04)	0.3 (0.01)	89.3 (3.5)
Average precipitation days (≥ 0.1 mm)	1.1	0.8	1.0	1.5	2.9	4.0	5.8	5.6	4.2	1.7	0.8	0.5	29.9
Average snowy days	1.9	1.2	1.1	0.5	0	0	0	0	0	0.5	1.1	1.2	7.5
Average relative humidity (%)	46	37	29	25	25	30	37	41	42	39	42	46	37
Mean monthly sunshine hours	235.9	229.9	267.9	284.9	311.5	296.9	289.6	279.8	250.9	263.4	237.8	231.0	3,179.5
Percentage possible sunshine	78	75	72	71	70	67	65	67	68	77	80	79	72
Source: China Meteorological Administration
