= Alxa League =

Alxa League 阿拉善盟 • ᠠᠯᠠᠱᠠ ᠠᠢᠮᠠᠭ
- League
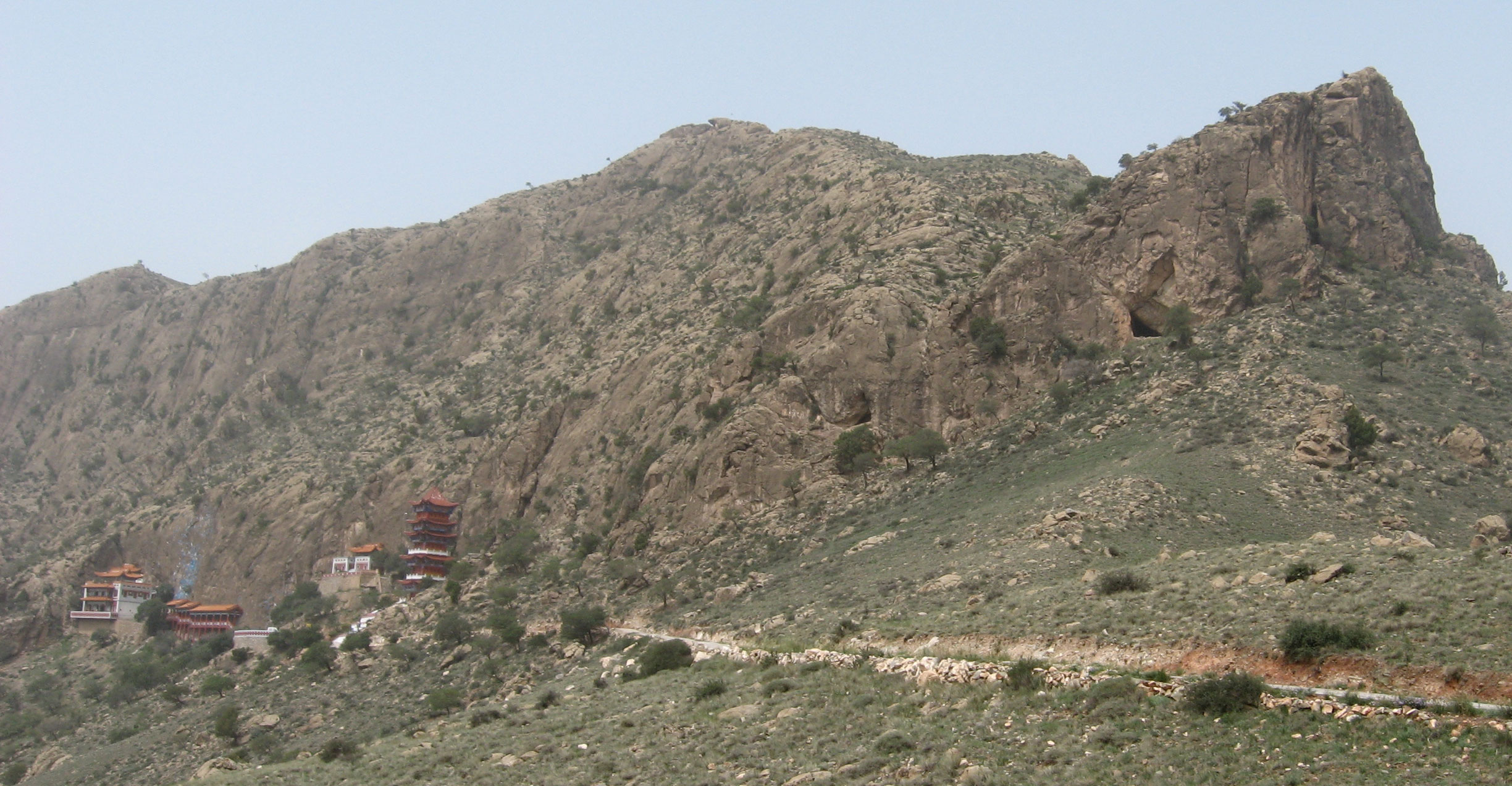
- Hanging Temple (悬空寺) nearby Guangzong Temple, a monastery in the Alaša mountains.

- Location of Alxa League in Inner Mongolia
- Coordinates (Alxa Left Banner): 38.83°N 105.67°E
- Country: People's Republic of China
- Autonomous region: Inner Mongolia
- League seat: Alxa Left Banner (Bayanhot)

Area
  - Total: 240,080 km^{2} (92,700 sq mi)

Population (2010)
  - Total: 231,334
  - Density: 0.96357/km^{2} (2.4956/sq mi)

GDP
  - Total: CN¥ 32.3 billion US$ 5.2 billion
  - Per capita: CN¥ 133,187; US$ 21,384
- Time zone: UTC+8 (China Standard)
- ISO 3166 code: CN-NM-29
- Website: www.alsm.gov.cn

Alxa League

Chinese name
- Chinese: 阿拉善盟
Transcriptions
Standard Mandarin
- Hanyu Pinyin: Ālāshàn Méng

Mongolian name
- Mongolian Cyrillic: Алшаа аймаг
- Mongolian script: ᠠᠯᠠᠱᠠ ᠠᠶᠢᠮᠠᠭ
Transcriptions
- SASM/GNC: Alaša ayimaɣ

Alxa League or Alashan League (Note: Chinese: 阿拉善盟; pinyin: Ālāshàn Méng; Mongolian: alasha ayimag, Mongolian Cyrillic: Алшаа аймаг) is one of 12 prefecture level divisions and 3 extant leagues, or aimags, of Inner Mongolia. The league borders Mongolia to the north, Bayan Nur to the northeast, Wuhai and Ordos to the east, Ningxia to the southeast, and Gansu to the south and west. The capital is Bayanhot town (Chinese: 巴彦浩特镇), formerly known as Dingyuanying (定远营镇) or Wang Ye Fu, in the aimag's Left Banner. The Mongolian variety spoken in this area is the Alasha dialect.

== Demographics ==
In the 2020 census, there were 262,361 inhabitants. Alxa is the least populated region of Inner Mongolia Autonomous Region.

A number of residents have been relocated from the growing Tengger Desert.

The proportion of nationalities in Alxa League (2020)
Nationality	Percentage
Han	75.2%
Mongols	19.1%
Hui	4.7%
Manchus	0.4%
Tibetans	0.1%
Tu	0.1%
Dongxiang	0.1%
Others	0.3%
Source of the population statistics :

== Economy ==
Since 2010, Alxa League has frequently appeared as one of the most prosperous prefecture-level divisions in all of China when measured by GDP per capita; in 2013, the GDP per head was approximately US$30,000. If using this measure alone, Alxa was ranked first in China, even higher than its neighbor Ordos. Wealth in the region is not evenly distributed, and the numbers are skewed by its low permanent population. Much of the productive economic activity takes place under the auspices of several large companies operating in the region, extracting natural resources. These include China Kingho Corporation, a "clean coal" technology operator, and the Inner Mongolia-based Taiximei Group. Due to its remote location, much of the economic activity takes place with the support of migrant laborers from other parts of China. The high per capita GDP is not reflected in the salaries of the average low-skilled worker, which is on par with other mid-sized Chinese cities.

== Administrative subdivisions ==
Alxa is divided into three banners:

Map
Name	Mongolian	Simplified Chinese	Hanyu Pinyin	Population (2010)	Area (km^{2})	Density (/km^{2})
Alxa Left Banner (Alxa Jun Banner)	ᠠᠯᠠᠱᠠ ᠵᠡᠭᠦᠨ ᠬᠣᠰᠢᠭᠤ (Alaša Jegün qosiɣu)	阿拉善左旗	Ālāshàn Zuǒ Qí	173,494	80,412	2.15
Alxa Right Banner (Alxa Barun Banner)	ᠠᠯᠠᠱᠠ ᠪᠠᠷᠠᠭᠤᠨ ᠬᠣᠰᠢᠭᠤ (Alaša Baraɣun qosiɣu)	阿拉善右旗	Ālāshàn Yòu Qí	25,430	72,556	0.35
Ejin Banner	ᠡᠵᠡᠨ᠎ᠡ ᠬᠣᠰᠢᠭᠤ (Ejen-e qosiɣu)	额济纳旗	Éjìnà Qí	32,410	114,606	0.28

== See also ==
- Jiuquan Satellite Launch Center
