= Alxa Left Banner =

Alxa Left Banner 阿拉善左旗 • ᠠᠯᠠᠱᠠ ᠵᠡᠭᠦᠨ ᠬᠣᠰᠢᠭᠤ
- Banner
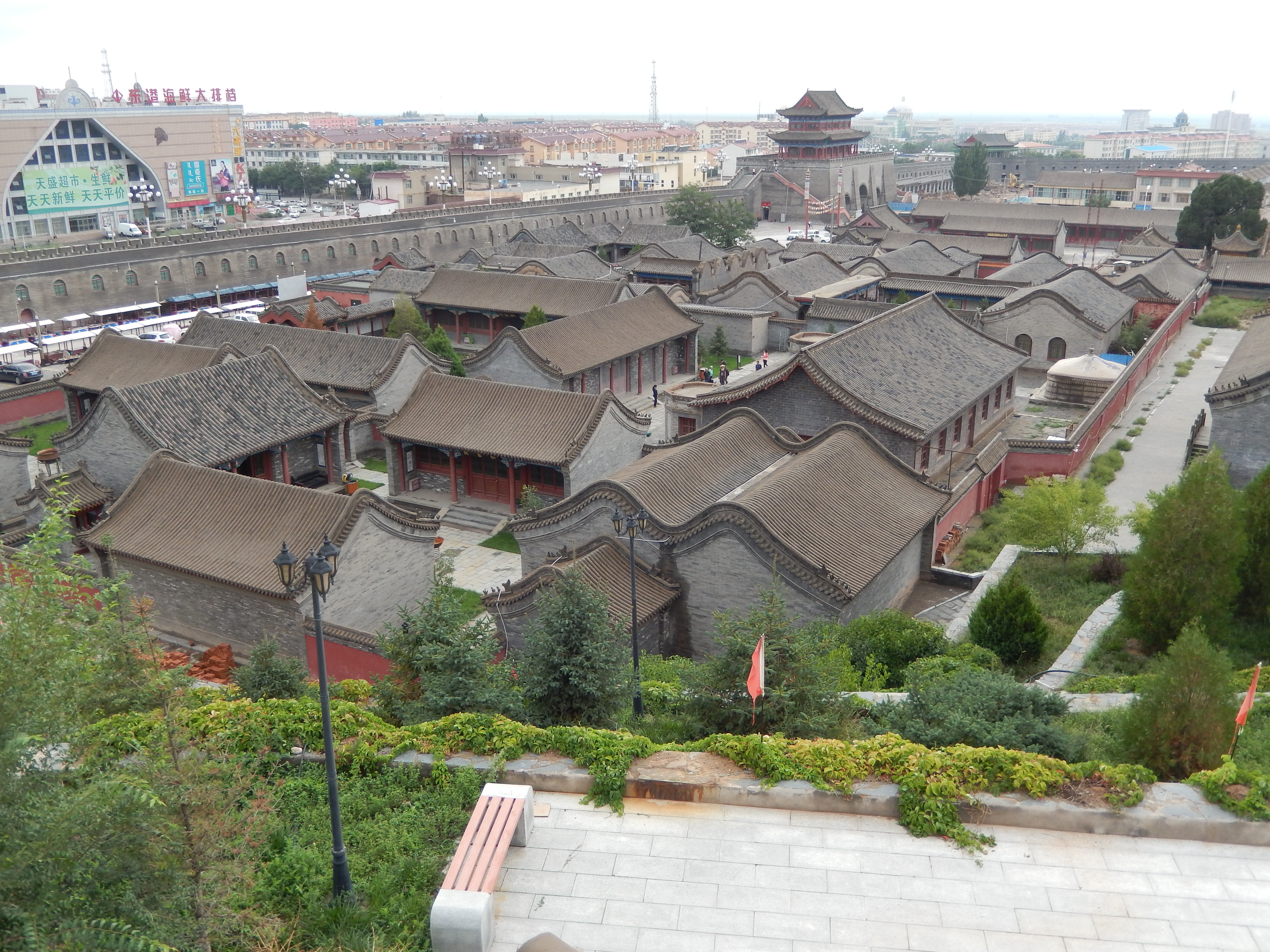

- Location of the seat in Inner Mongolia Alxa Left (China)
- Coordinates (Alxa Left Banner government): 38°50′00″N 105°39′59″E
- Country: China
- Autonomous region: Inner Mongolia
- League: Alxa
- Incorporation into Qing Empire: 1697
- Banner founded: 1961
- Named for: Alxa League
- Banner seat: Bayanhot

Area
  - Total: 80,412 km^{2} (31,047 sq mi)

Population (2020)
  - Total: 203,958
  - Density: 2.5364/km^{2} (6.5693/sq mi)
- Time zone: UTC+8 (China Standard)
- Postal code: 750306
- Area code: 0483
- Website: www.alszq.gov.cn

Alxa Left Banner

Chinese name
- Chinese: 阿拉善左旗
Transcriptions
Standard Mandarin
- Hanyu Pinyin: Ālāshàn Zuǒ Qí

Mongolian name
- Mongolian Cyrillic: Алшаа зүүн хошуу
- Mongolian script: ᠠᠯᠠᠱᠠ ᠵᠡᠭᠦᠨ ᠬᠣᠰᠢᠭᠤ
Transcriptions
- SASM/GNC: Alaša Jegün qosiɣu

Alxa Left Banner (Mongolian: ᠠᠯᠠᠱᠠ ᠵᠡᠭᠦᠨ ᠬᠣᠰᠢᠭᠤ; Chinese: 阿拉善左旗) is a banner (administrative division) in the southwest of Inner Mongolia, China. It borders Mongolia's Ömnögovi Province to the north, the autonomous region of Ningxia to the southeast, and Gansu province to the southwest. The town of Bayanhot, situated in the banner, is the seat of government of the greater Alxa League, of which Alxa Left Banner is a part.

== History ==
In 2017, the Dingyuan Garrison Historical Site in Bayanhot was renovated, having been originally constructed during the reign of Emperor Yongzheng.

In February 2023, the Xinjing Coal Industry Open Pit Coal Mine collapsed in the banner, with many people injured or missing.

== Demographics ==
Ethnic Mongols make up 21% of the banner population.

The proportion of nationalities in Alxa Left Banner (2020)
Nationality	Percentage
Han	72.8%
Mongols	20.8%
Hui People	5.6%
Manchus	0.4%
Tibetans	0.1%
Tujia	0.1%
Others	0.2%
Source of the population statistics :

== Administrative divisions ==
The banner is subdivided into 4 subdistricts, 8 towns, and 6 sums.

Name	Simplified Chinese	Hanyu Pinyin	Mongolian (Hudum Script)	Mongolian (Cyrillic)	Administrative division code
Subdistricts
Old Subdistrict	巴彦浩特额鲁特街道	Bāyànhàotè Élǔtè Jiēdào	ᠥᠭᠡᠯᠡᠳ ᠵᠡᠭᠡᠯᠢ ᠭᠤᠳᠤᠮᠵᠢ	Өөлд зээл гудамж	152921402
Nanhuan Road Subdistrict	巴彦浩特南环路街道	Bāyànhàotè Nánhuánlù Jiēdào	ᠡᠮᠦᠨ᠎ᠡ ᠲᠣᠭᠣᠷᠢᠯᠲᠠ ᠵᠡᠭᠡᠯᠢ ᠭᠤᠳᠤᠮᠵᠢ	Өмнө тойролт зээл гудамж	152921403
Xinhua Subdistrict	巴彦浩特新华街道	Bāyànhàotè Xīnhuá Jiēdào	ᠰᠢᠨᠬᠤᠸᠠ ᠵᠡᠭᠡᠯᠢ ᠭᠤᠳᠤᠮᠵᠢ	Шинхуа зээл гудамж	152921404
Wangfu Subdistrict	巴彦浩特王府街道	Bāyànhàotè Wángfǔ Jiēdào	ᠸᠠᠩᠹᠦ᠋ ᠵᠡᠭᠡᠯᠢ ᠭᠤᠳᠤᠮᠵᠢ	Ванфу зээл гудамж	152921405
Towns
Undralt Town	温都尔勒图镇	Wēndū'ěrlètú Zhèn	ᠤᠨᠳᠤᠷᠤᠯᠲᠤ ᠪᠠᠯᠭᠠᠰᠤ	Ундралд балгас	152921102
Barun Beil Town	巴润别立镇	Bārùnbiélì Zhèn	ᠪᠠᠷᠠᠭᠤᠨᠪᠡᠯ ᠪᠠᠯᠭᠠᠰᠤ	Баруунбэл балгас	152921105
Bayan Hot Town	巴彦浩特镇	Bāyànhàotè Zhèn	ᠪᠠᠶᠠᠨᠬᠣᠲᠠ ᠪᠠᠯᠭᠠᠰᠤ	Баянхот балгас	152921110
Jargal Saihan Town	嘉尔嘎勒赛汉镇	Jiā'ěrgālèsàihàn Zhèn	ᠵᠢᠷᠭᠠᠯᠰᠠᠢᠬᠠᠨ ᠪᠠᠯᠭᠠᠰᠤ	Жаргалсайхан балгас	152921111
Jartai Town	吉兰泰镇	Jílántài Zhèn	ᠵᠢᠷᠠᠲᠠᠢ ᠪᠠᠯᠭᠠᠰᠤ	Жартай балгас	152921112
Jun Beil Town	宗别立镇	Zōngbiélì Zhèn	ᠵᠡᠭᠦᠨᠪᠡᠯ ᠪᠠᠯᠭᠠᠰᠤ	Зүүнбэл балгас	152921113
Olon Bulag Town	敖伦布拉格镇	Áolúnbùlāgé Zhèn	ᠣᠯᠠᠨᠪᠤᠯᠠᠭ ᠪᠠᠯᠭᠠᠰᠤ	Олонбулаг балгас	152921114
Tengger Els Town	腾格里额里斯镇	Ténggélǐ'élǐsī Zhèn	ᠲᠩᠷᠢᠡᠯᠡᠰᠦ ᠪᠠᠯᠭᠠᠰᠤ	Тэнгэр-элс балгас	152921115
Sums
Bayan Morin Sum	巴彦木仁苏木	Bāyànmùrén Sūmù	ᠪᠠᠶᠠᠨᠮᠥ᠋ᠷᠡᠨ ᠰᠤᠮᠤ	Баянмөрөн сум	152921203
Olji Sum	乌力吉苏木	Wūlìjí Sūmù	ᠥᠯᠵᠡᠢ ᠰᠤᠮᠤ	Өлзий сум	152921213
Bayan Nurun Sum	巴彦诺日公苏木	Bāyànnuòrìgōng Sūmù	ᠪᠠᠶᠠᠨᠨᠢᠷᠤᠭᠤᠨ ᠰᠤᠮᠤ	Баян-нуруун сум	152921214
Erh Hasah Sum	额尔克哈什哈苏木	É'ěrkèhàshíhā Sūmù	ᠡᠷᠬᠡᠬᠠᠰᠢᠬ᠎ᠠ ᠰᠤᠮᠤ	Эрх-хаших сум	152921215
Inggen Sum	银根苏木	Yíngēn Sūmù	ᠢᠩᠭᠡᠨ ᠰᠤᠮᠤ	Ингэн сум	152921216
Qogt Hure Sum	超格图呼热苏木	Chāogétúhūrè Sūmù	ᠴᠣᠭᠲᠤᠬᠦ᠋ᠷᠢᠶ᠎ᠡ ᠰᠤᠮᠤ	Цогт-хүрээ сум	152921217

Other: Luanjingtan Ecological Immigration Demonstration Zone (孪井滩生态移民示范区)

== Geography and climate ==
The average elevation is between 800 and 1,500 meters (2,600 and 4,900 ft) above sea level. Most of the banner has a cool arid climate (Köppen BWk), although this approaches a cool semi-arid climate (BSk) at the highest altitudes.

Climate data for Alxa Left Banner, elevation 1,561 m (5,121 ft), (1991–2020 normals, extremes 1991–present)
Month	Jan	Feb	Mar	Apr	May	Jun	Jul	Aug	Sep	Oct	Nov	Dec	Year
Record high °C (°F)	14.7 (58.5)	20.0 (68.0)	25.4 (77.7)	31.0 (87.8)	34.5 (94.1)	35.1 (95.2)	35.0 (95.0)	36.4 (97.5)	33.5 (92.3)	29.1 (84.4)	20.7 (69.3)	14.2 (57.6)	36.4 (97.5)
Mean daily maximum °C (°F)	−1.8 (28.8)	2.8 (37.0)	9.3 (48.7)	16.9 (62.4)	22.5 (72.5)	27.2 (81.0)	29.2 (84.6)	27.3 (81.1)	21.9 (71.4)	14.9 (58.8)	6.9 (44.4)	−0.2 (31.6)	14.7 (58.5)
Daily mean °C (°F)	−7.5 (18.5)	−3.1 (26.4)	3.6 (38.5)	11.1 (52.0)	16.9 (62.4)	21.9 (71.4)	23.8 (74.8)	22.0 (71.6)	16.4 (61.5)	9.0 (48.2)	1.0 (33.8)	−5.9 (21.4)	9.1 (48.4)
Mean daily minimum °C (°F)	−11.5 (11.3)	−7.5 (18.5)	−1.1 (30.0)	5.5 (41.9)	11.1 (52.0)	16.4 (61.5)	18.5 (65.3)	17.0 (62.6)	11.8 (53.2)	4.5 (40.1)	−3.1 (26.4)	−9.9 (14.2)	4.3 (39.8)
Record low °C (°F)	−22.9 (−9.2)	−22.1 (−7.8)	−16.6 (2.1)	−8.0 (17.6)	−3.5 (25.7)	5.5 (41.9)	10.6 (51.1)	6.5 (43.7)	−0.3 (31.5)	−8.6 (16.5)	−19.5 (−3.1)	−25.2 (−13.4)	−25.2 (−13.4)
Average precipitation mm (inches)	1.8 (0.07)	2.5 (0.10)	5.9 (0.23)	11.8 (0.46)	24.8 (0.98)	30.4 (1.20)	50.3 (1.98)	43.7 (1.72)	34.1 (1.34)	13.5 (0.53)	4.9 (0.19)	1.5 (0.06)	225.2 (8.86)
Average precipitation days (≥ 0.1 mm)	2.4	1.8	2.8	3.5	5.0	6.4	8.6	7.9	6.6	3.8	2.6	1.9	53.3
Average snowy days	3.4	2.9	2.9	1.4	0.2	0	0	0	0	1.3	3.3	3.0	18.4
Average relative humidity (%)	43	35	30	27	29	34	43	46	46	41	41	43	38
Mean monthly sunshine hours	223.2	219.1	250.6	268.8	298.6	283.4	279.4	267.2	234.7	243.5	224.1	218.8	3,011.4
Percentage possible sunshine	73	71	67	67	67	64	62	64	64	71	75	75	68
Source: China Meteorological Administration

Climate data for Jia'ergalesaihan Town, Alxa Left Banner, elevation 1,381 m (4,531 ft), (1991–2020 normals)
Month	Jan	Feb	Mar	Apr	May	Jun	Jul	Aug	Sep	Oct	Nov	Dec	Year
Mean daily maximum °C (°F)	−0.9 (30.4)	4.3 (39.7)	11.8 (53.2)	19.3 (66.7)	24.4 (75.9)	29.1 (84.4)	30.5 (86.9)	28.4 (83.1)	22.8 (73.0)	16.5 (61.7)	8.3 (46.9)	0.5 (32.9)	16.3 (61.2)
Daily mean °C (°F)	−8.5 (16.7)	−3.4 (25.9)	4.3 (39.7)	12.0 (53.6)	17.7 (63.9)	22.7 (72.9)	24.1 (75.4)	22.0 (71.6)	16.5 (61.7)	9.4 (48.9)	0.7 (33.3)	−6.9 (19.6)	9.2 (48.6)
Mean daily minimum °C (°F)	−14.4 (6.1)	−9.5 (14.9)	−1.9 (28.6)	5.1 (41.2)	10.9 (51.6)	16.1 (61.0)	18.1 (64.6)	16.5 (61.7)	11.4 (52.5)	3.9 (39.0)	−4.7 (23.5)	−12.4 (9.7)	3.3 (37.9)
Average precipitation mm (inches)	1.7 (0.07)	1.3 (0.05)	3.6 (0.14)	8.2 (0.32)	19.6 (0.77)	28.4 (1.12)	33.4 (1.31)	37.3 (1.47)	29.4 (1.16)	14.4 (0.57)	4.1 (0.16)	0.5 (0.02)	181.9 (7.16)
Average precipitation days (≥ 0.1 mm)	2.2	1.3	2.1	3.3	5.7	6.0	6.9	8.1	7.6	4.2	2.0	1.1	50.5
Average snowy days	3.4	2.4	1.6	1.0	0.1	0	0	0	0	0.9	2.3	2.3	14
Average relative humidity (%)	50	43	34	32	36	40	50	56	59	52	52	51	46
Mean monthly sunshine hours	222.5	221.0	261.6	276.9	293.1	291.9	281.3	254.8	218.0	241.1	224.3	222.8	3,009.3
Percentage possible sunshine	72	72	70	70	66	66	63	61	59	71	75	75	68
Source: China Meteorological Administration

Climate data for Bayannuorigong Sumu (Bayannuoergong), Alxa Left Banner, elevation 1,324 m (4,344 ft), (1991–2020 normals)
Month	Jan	Feb	Mar	Apr	May	Jun	Jul	Aug	Sep	Oct	Nov	Dec	Year
Mean daily maximum °C (°F)	−2.5 (27.5)	2.5 (36.5)	9.7 (49.5)	17.9 (64.2)	24.3 (75.7)	29.4 (84.9)	31.4 (88.5)	29.2 (84.6)	23.4 (74.1)	15.8 (60.4)	6.6 (43.9)	−1.0 (30.2)	15.6 (60.0)
Daily mean °C (°F)	−11.0 (12.2)	−6.0 (21.2)	1.6 (34.9)	10.3 (50.5)	17.2 (63.0)	22.7 (72.9)	24.8 (76.6)	22.5 (72.5)	16.3 (61.3)	7.8 (46.0)	−1.4 (29.5)	−9.1 (15.6)	8.0 (46.4)
Mean daily minimum °C (°F)	−18.2 (−0.8)	−13.4 (7.9)	−5.8 (21.6)	2.4 (36.3)	9.3 (48.7)	15.2 (59.4)	18.0 (64.4)	16.0 (60.8)	9.9 (49.8)	1.0 (33.8)	−7.8 (18.0)	−15.8 (3.6)	0.9 (33.6)
Average precipitation mm (inches)	0.6 (0.02)	0.8 (0.03)	2.0 (0.08)	3.6 (0.14)	11.3 (0.44)	20.5 (0.81)	27.9 (1.10)	29.5 (1.16)	21.1 (0.83)	5.7 (0.22)	1.1 (0.04)	0.5 (0.02)	124.6 (4.89)
Average precipitation days (≥ 0.1 mm)	1.0	0.9	1.6	2.1	3.5	5.4	7.2	6.4	5.1	2.0	1.3	1.0	37.5
Average snowy days	2.8	1.6	1.8	0.8	0.1	0	0	0	0	0.7	1.8	2.0	11.6
Average relative humidity (%)	51	40	30	25	26	32	41	45	45	40	46	51	39
Mean monthly sunshine hours	233.9	232.1	273.6	284.5	320.6	303.7	288.3	282.9	260.4	269.8	234.0	227.2	3,211
Percentage possible sunshine	78	76	73	71	72	68	64	67	71	80	79	79	73
Source: China Meteorological Administration

Climate data for Wusitai Town, Alxa Left Banner, elevation 1,253 m (4,111 ft), (1991–2020 normals)
Month	Jan	Feb	Mar	Apr	May	Jun	Jul	Aug	Sep	Oct	Nov	Dec	Year
Mean daily maximum °C (°F)	−2.1 (28.2)	2.8 (37.0)	11.3 (52.3)	19.1 (66.4)	24.7 (76.5)	29.3 (84.7)	31.4 (88.5)	29.0 (84.2)	23.1 (73.6)	16.3 (61.3)	7.1 (44.8)	−0.5 (31.1)	16.0 (60.7)
Daily mean °C (°F)	−7.5 (18.5)	−3.3 (26.1)	4.9 (40.8)	12.7 (54.9)	18.3 (64.9)	23.3 (73.9)	25.1 (77.2)	23.0 (73.4)	17.2 (63.0)	10.3 (50.5)	1.7 (35.1)	−5.7 (21.7)	10.0 (50.0)
Mean daily minimum °C (°F)	−12.3 (9.9)	−8.5 (16.7)	−1.0 (30.2)	6.1 (43.0)	11.4 (52.5)	16.8 (62.2)	19.0 (66.2)	17.4 (63.3)	11.9 (53.4)	4.8 (40.6)	−2.9 (26.8)	−10.2 (13.6)	4.4 (39.9)
Average precipitation mm (inches)	1.1 (0.04)	1.1 (0.04)	3.6 (0.14)	5.7 (0.22)	14.9 (0.59)	21.4 (0.84)	39.6 (1.56)	35.2 (1.39)	35.4 (1.39)	11.5 (0.45)	4.1 (0.16)	0.8 (0.03)	174.4 (6.85)
Average precipitation days (≥ 0.1 mm)	1.9	1.0	2.2	2.8	3.8	5.2	6.1	6.0	7.1	3.2	2.2	1.5	43
Average snowy days	3.3	2.0	1.8	0.8	0	0	0	0	0.1	0.8	2.2	3.5	14.5
Average relative humidity (%)	44	38	27	27	29	36	46	49	52	43	46	45	40
Mean monthly sunshine hours	223.9	229.9	266.5	283.9	307.0	290.7	281.5	262.4	234.4	253.3	220.8	217.3	3,071.6
Percentage possible sunshine	74	75	71	71	69	65	62	63	64	74	74	75	70
Source: China Meteorological Administration

Climate data for Jilantai Town, Alxa Left Banner, elevation 1,032 m (3,386 ft), (1991–2020 normals)
Month	Jan	Feb	Mar	Apr	May	Jun	Jul	Aug	Sep	Oct	Nov	Dec	Year
Mean daily maximum °C (°F)	−1.5 (29.3)	4.2 (39.6)	11.9 (53.4)	20.3 (68.5)	26.6 (79.9)	31.4 (88.5)	33.5 (92.3)	31.3 (88.3)	25.5 (77.9)	17.7 (63.9)	8.2 (46.8)	0.0 (32.0)	17.4 (63.4)
Daily mean °C (°F)	−9.5 (14.9)	−4.3 (24.3)	3.6 (38.5)	12.3 (54.1)	19.0 (66.2)	24.4 (75.9)	26.5 (79.7)	24.3 (75.7)	18.1 (64.6)	9.6 (49.3)	0.5 (32.9)	−7.4 (18.7)	9.8 (49.6)
Mean daily minimum °C (°F)	−15.7 (3.7)	−11.3 (11.7)	−3.6 (25.5)	4.4 (39.9)	11.0 (51.8)	16.8 (62.2)	19.6 (67.3)	17.7 (63.9)	11.6 (52.9)	3.2 (37.8)	−5.3 (22.5)	−13.0 (8.6)	3.0 (37.3)
Average precipitation mm (inches)	0.5 (0.02)	0.9 (0.04)	2.8 (0.11)	3.9 (0.15)	12.0 (0.47)	13.6 (0.54)	23.2 (0.91)	26.0 (1.02)	17.6 (0.69)	5.0 (0.20)	1.4 (0.06)	0.5 (0.02)	107.4 (4.23)
Average precipitation days (≥ 0.1 mm)	0.8	0.6	1.6	1.8	3.2	4.6	6.1	5.6	4.7	2.1	0.9	0.6	32.6
Average snowy days	1.5	1.0	1.2	0.3	0	0	0	0	0	0.2	1.1	1.3	6.6
Average relative humidity (%)	48	38	31	25	27	33	41	45	46	42	44	48	39
Mean monthly sunshine hours	234.4	233.0	273.5	292.9	324.5	311.1	305.5	294.7	267.1	270.1	234.3	227.9	3,269
Percentage possible sunshine	78	76	73	73	73	70	68	70	73	79	79	79	74
Source: China Meteorological Administration

== Transport ==
Alxa Left Banner is on the route of provincial highway S218, which is accessible via China National Highway 110 via the city of Wuhai. It is also accessible by air via the Alxa Left Banner Bayanhot Airport.
