= Sumu =

Sumu may refer to:

- SUMU, ICAO code for the Carrasco International Airport, Uruguay
- Sum, a type of administrative region in Mongolia, China and some areas of Russia (sometimes known as a sumu in Inner Mongolia).
- Mayangna people, an indigenous people of Central America
- Sumo languages
- Sumu Wildlife Park, in the Sumu forest, Nigeria
- Caesalpinia sappan (苏木; sūmù), a plant used in traditional Chinese medicine
