= Sums of Inner Mongolia =

Administrative division of Inner Mongolia, China

Sum

Mongolian name
- Mongolian Cyrillic: сум
- Mongolian script: ᠰᠤᠮᠤ
Transcriptions
- SASM/GNC: sum

Chinese name
- Simplified Chinese: 苏木
- Traditional Chinese: 蘇木
Transcriptions
Standard Mandarin
- Hanyu Pinyin: sūmù

In Inner Mongolia, China, a sum or sumu is a township-level political/administrative division. The sum division is equivalent to a township but is unique to Inner Mongolia. It is therefore larger than a gaqa (village) and smaller than a banner (the Inner Mongolia equivalent of the county-level division). Examples include Shiwei, Inner Mongolia and Honggor Sum, Siziwang Banner.

Sum whose population is predominated by ethnic minorities are designated ethnic sum – parallel with the ethnic township in the rest of China. As of 2010, there is only one ethnic sum in China, the Evenk Ethnic Sum. The Enhe Russian Ethnic Township of Inner Mongolia is not called sum.

== History ==
The past century saw immense change in the local administrative processes within China, invoked by political movement, civil wars and the changing role of rural regions. This eventually turned in the sum system in 1983.

=== 1961–1982 ===
In the period of 1961–1983, China introduced the commune-brigade system to locally administrate “socio-economic functions” under the rule of Mao Zedong.

The commune is the lowest rank of authority in the Chinese government underneath the “central government, provincial (autonomous region) government and county government.” The commune authority had the responsibility of specific key functions including supplementing reinforcement to the army regime, fluent connections between party members, administration of economic goals and ensuring correct was carried out in response to crime. It helped orchestrate and maintain three integral organisations that overlooked women's role in society, developing the youth generation and fulfilling needs of herdsman.

The brigade authority supplemented the commune role, through the organisations of meetings that enacted the plans and policies defined by the commune. It oversaw grassland protection schemes, preservation of livestock, the family planning programme, taxation processes and financially supported herdsman. Resources such as tractors, storage houses and general equipment required to carry out economic functions were organised by the unit. The brigade provided resources needed to carry out infrastructure projects directed by upper authorities.

=== 1983 ===
The 1980s was the period of decentralisation and mass reformation within the domestic economic, trading systems and finance. This included greater integration of rural government in economic decisions. 1983 was China's first administrative reform, aimed to restructure the government and establish a “retirement and tenure system.” This aimed to reduce individuals in government positions for long periods of time. It meant the dissolvement of commune-brigade system, reforming into the sum-gaca system. This system still retains the political and administrative functions, however, not involved in the agricultural organisation.

The collective livestock was redistricted to households within the gaca (previously called the brigade) based on the capacity of the households, roughly equating to over 50 per person. This determined the territory distributed according to the size and needs of animals. Native herdsmen were given favoured distribution due to their experience and knowledge.

The reform meant some government roles were united, reducing the number of overall positions within the sum. This reduced total number of agencies from 60 to 50 in provinces, 40 to 30 in the autonomous regions and 40 to 25 in counties. In regional provinces within China and Mongolia, “staffing decreased from over 180,000 to about 120,000” This reformation involved a significant time lag in implementation due to the large scope of townships and their cultural differences. The reform was due to the economic needs of China, and increased demand for economic improvement. The restructure of government-based institutions was to redistribute the sum's role in responding to economic shocks and high-level authority requests.

== Impact on population ==
=== Migration ===
Migration saw an increase under the previous commune-brigade system, due to the introduction of collective hard labour tasks requiring migrants with agricultural background. The shift to the sum system meant the removal of work assignments by higher authorities. This saw a spike of migrants moving back out of sums in conquest for stable employment opportunities. The Chinese State Statistical Bureau released a national survey in 1987 showing that between the years 1982 and 1987 there was a net rural-urban migration of 13 million, in comparison to the 35 million in the period of 1978 and 1982. The old system provided work points and residential registration, in exchange for the completion of tasks rejected by the native's herdsman. These tasks included gardening, supply of food chain, use of gardening equipment, construction work and other one-off tasks enforced by the government.

== Impact on agriculture ==
=== Distribution of land ===
Despite the productivity gains land distribution was still skewed under the idea that land was owned by every member of the sum, neglecting the arduous nature of agricultural maintenance. The entirety of the population had claim on land property and the distribution was primarily based on size of household members and villager stater commonly disregarded accumulation of skill and experience. This eligibility system increased the worry in farmers about losing land and investment. This partially stagnated growth and reduced motivation to develop agricultural infrastructure. The irrigation system remained unchanged in the 1980s, due to the technical difficulty and risk induced nature of developing it.

The distribution of land caused disputes amongst livestock keepers, as the natural requirement for certain pasturage was not taken into account in the division of land. Farmland in these areas differed in terms of soil types, access to irrigation resources and the types of plants they can foster. The reformation left unconsidered the “indivisibility of pasture necessary for seasonal pasturage” and how different locations change according to the soil type and exposure to extreme conditions. Cultivated was left to waste seasonally and commonly fragmented as boundaries were formed to separate households and create divisions.

A survey conducted by the Chinese Ministry of Agriculture of 7983 sample villages within the Chinese provinces showed that in 1986, “average cultivated area per household 0.466 ha (7 mu),3 fragmented into 5.85 plots, each plot on average 0.08 ha” This method of division has remained in modern society limiting these areas in using more advanced methods of production that capitalise on technical infrastructures. The constant redistribution of land was embedded with additional costs and time, reducing the efficiency of the implementation process.

Before the introduction of sums, pasture of herdsman would shift from mountains to lowlands, in response to seasonal change. The territorial-administrative division meant that within Mongolia, 60 sums were strictly in high mountain regions and 40 were in forage dense areas. The homogenisation initially restricted gross pasture produced by each sum and overall health of livestock.

The land currently owned by the Ogiinuur Sum, in Mongolia, was previously used for strictly summer and fall pasture due to the seasons. In 1983, the redistribution of land meant the sum allocated to the land had no appropriate pasture for the remaining two seasons. This caused high fatality rates in livestock. In 1983, this Ogiinuur Sum faced the highest percentage of deaths in total livestock within Mongolia.

=== Non-agricultural business ===
The sum administration shift saw an increase in productivity which led to decline in the need for rural workers. However, rural townships that's predominant income was derived from non-agricultural activities had significant growth. The shift to sum administration relaxed restrictions surrounding access to machinery and processing materials, facilitating for growth in production fields. These towns become major contributors to economic growth of China. Their availability to resource allows them to quickly respond to changing demand in the urban areas. Employment in these towns increased from 23 million in 1977 to 52 million in 1984. This heavily benefits farmers who saw an increase in income of 15.7 percent from 1978 to 1984.

== See also ==
- List of township-level divisions of Inner Mongolia
