= Hobor =

Town in Inner Mongolia, China

Coordinates: 41°16′12″N 112°37′01″E

Hobor (simplified Chinese: 科布尔; traditional Chinese: 科布爾; pinyin: Kēbù'ěr) is a town over 40 kilometres (25 mi) northwest of Jining in Inner Mongolia, China. Previously known as T'ao-lin (Chinese: 陶林; pinyin: Taolin), it is now the administrative center of the Chahar Right Middle Banner. Hobor is a crossroads town where roads linking the north of the province pass through the Yin Mountains to Jining and Hohhot (Kweisui) in the Yellow River valley to the southeast.

== Sources ==
- Directory of Cities and Towns in World, China:Nei Mongol Zizhiqu: Hobor
