= Administrative divisions of China =

Since the 15th century, the administrative divisions of China have consisted of several levels due to China's large population and geographical area. The Ministry of Civil Affairs determines that there are four levels of divisions: provincial-level, prefecture-level, county-level, and township-level.

Since the 17th century, provincial-level division boundaries in China have remained largely static. After the establishment of the People's Republic of China in 1949, major changes include the reorganization of provinces in the Northeast and the formation of autonomous regions, based on the subdivisions of the Soviet Union. Provincial-level divisions serve an important cultural role in China, as people tend to identify with their native province.

== Levels ==
The Ministry of Civil Affairs determines that there are four levels of divisions: provincial-level, prefecture-level, county-level, and township-level. Each of the levels, except for the provincial-level special administrative regions, corresponds to a level in the civil service.

=== Summary ===
This table summarizes the divisions of the area administered by the People's Republic of China as of June 2017.

Level	Name	Types
1	33 provincial-level divisions (1 claimed)	22 provinces (1 claimed); 5 autonomous regions; 4 municipalities; 2 special administrative regions
2	333 prefectural-level divisions (6 claimed)	293 prefecture-level cities (6 claimed); 7 prefectures; 30 autonomous prefectures; 3 leagues
3	2,850 county-level divisions (173 claimed)	954 districts (158 claimed); 366 county-level cities (3 claimed); 1,359 counties (12 claimed); 117 autonomous counties; 49 banners; 3 autonomous banners; 1 special district; 1 forestry district
4	39,863 township-level divisions (214 claimed)	8,122 subdistricts (26 claimed); 20,942 towns (41 claimed); 9,659 townships (147 claimed); 985 ethnic townships; 2 county-controlled districts; 152 sums; 1 ethnic sum

=== Table ===
Structural hierarchy of the administrative divisions and basic level autonomies of the People's Republic of China
Provincial level (1st)	Prefectural level (2nd)	County level (3rd)	Township level (4th)	Basic level autonomy (5th)
Autonomous region	Sub-provincial-level autonomous prefecture	District; County-level city County; Autonomous county Banner; Autonomous banners	Subdistrict; Town; Township; Ethnic township County-controlled districts Sum; Ethnic sum	Community (社区 / 社) (Residential committees; 居民委员会); Village / Gaqa (嘎查) (Villager committees; 村民委员会)
Autonomous region	Prefectural-level city	District; County-level city County; Autonomous county Banner; Autonomous banners	Subdistrict; Town; Township; Ethnic township County-controlled districts Sum; Ethnic sum	Community (社区 / 社) (Residential committees; 居民委员会); Village / Gaqa (嘎查) (Villager committees; 村民委员会)
Autonomous region	Autonomous prefecture Prefecture; Leagues	District; County-level city County; Autonomous county Banner; Autonomous banners	Subdistrict; Town; Township; Ethnic township County-controlled districts Sum; Ethnic sum	Community (社区 / 社) (Residential committees; 居民委员会); Village / Gaqa (嘎查) (Villager committees; 村民委员会)
Province			Subdistrict; Town; Township; Ethnic township County-controlled districts Sum; Ethnic sum	Community (社区 / 社) (Residential committees; 居民委员会); Village / Gaqa (嘎查) (Villager committees; 村民委员会)
Province	Sub-provincial-level city	District; Special district County-level city County; Autonomous county	Subdistrict; Town; Township; Ethnic township County-controlled districts Sum; Ethnic sum	Community (社区 / 社) (Residential committees; 居民委员会); Village / Gaqa (嘎查) (Villager committees; 村民委员会)
Province	Prefectural-level city	District; Special district County-level city County; Autonomous county	Subdistrict; Town; Township; Ethnic township County-controlled districts Sum; Ethnic sum	Community (社区 / 社) (Residential committees; 居民委员会); Village / Gaqa (嘎查) (Villager committees; 村民委员会)
Province	Autonomous prefecture Prefecture	District; Special district County-level city County; Autonomous county	Subdistrict; Town; Township; Ethnic township County-controlled districts Sum; Ethnic sum	Community (社区 / 社) (Residential committees; 居民委员会); Village / Gaqa (嘎查) (Villager committees; 村民委员会)
Province	Sub-prefectural-level city		Subdistrict; Town; Township; Ethnic township County-controlled districts Sum; Ethnic sum	Community (社区 / 社) (Residential committees; 居民委员会); Village / Gaqa (嘎查) (Villager committees; 村民委员会)
Province	Forestry district (林区)		Subdistrict; Town; Township; Ethnic township County-controlled districts Sum; Ethnic sum	Community (社区 / 社) (Residential committees; 居民委员会); Village / Gaqa (嘎查) (Villager committees; 村民委员会)
Municipality	Sub-provincial-level new area		Subdistrict; Town; Township; Ethnic township County-controlled districts Sum; Ethnic sum	Community (社区 / 社) (Residential committees; 居民委员会); Village / Gaqa (嘎查) (Villager committees; 村民委员会)
Municipality	District		Subdistrict; Town; Township; Ethnic township County-controlled districts Sum; Ethnic sum	Community (社区 / 社) (Residential committees; 居民委员会); Village / Gaqa (嘎查) (Villager committees; 村民委员会)
Municipality	County		Subdistrict; Town; Township; Ethnic township County-controlled districts Sum; Ethnic sum	Community (社区 / 社) (Residential committees; 居民委员会); Village / Gaqa (嘎查) (Villager committees; 村民委员会)
Special administrative region (Part of the One country, two systems)	see Region (informal)	see District		
Special administrative region (Part of the One country, two systems)	see Civic and Municipal Affairs Bureau	see Freguesia		

=== Provincial level (1st) ===
The People's Republic of China (PRC) lays claims to 34 province-level divisions, including 22 provinces, 5 autonomous regions, 4 municipalities, 2 special administrative regions, and 1 claimed province.

Provinces are theoretically subordinate to the PRC central government, but in practice, provincial officials have considerable discretion over economic policy. Unlike in the United States, the central government's power was (with the exception of the military) not exercised through a parallel set of institutions until the early 1990s. The actual practical power of the provinces has created what some economists call "federalism with Chinese characteristics".

Most of the provinces, with the exception of those in the northeast, have boundaries which were established long ago in the Yuan, Ming, and Qing dynasties. Sometimes provincial borders coincide with cultural or geographic boundaries. This was an attempt by the imperial government to discourage separatism and warlordism through a divide and rule policy. Nevertheless, provinces have come to serve an important cultural role in China. People tend to be identified in terms of their native provinces, and each province has a stereotype associated with its inhabitants.

The most recent administrative changes have included the elevation of Hainan (1988) and Chongqing (1997) to provincial level status, and the designation of Hong Kong (1997) and Macau (1999) as special administrative regions.

Provincial level governments vary in details of organization:

==== Provincial-level (1st) subdivisions ====
22 Provinces: A standard provincial government is nominally led by a provincial committee, headed by a secretary. The committee secretary is first-in-charge of the province, come in second is the governor of the provincial government.
5 Autonomous regions: A minority subject which has a higher population of a particular minority ethnic group along with its own local government, but an autonomous region theoretically has more legislative rights than in actual practice. The governor of the Autonomous Regions is usually appointed from the respective minority ethnic group.
4 Municipalities: A higher level of city that is directly under the Chinese government, with status equal to that of the provinces. In practice, their political status is higher than that of common provinces.
2 Special administrative regions: A highly autonomous and self-governing subnational subject of the People's Republic of China. Each SAR has a chief executive as head of the region and head of government. The SAR's government is not fully independent, as foreign policy and military defence are the responsibility of the central government, according to the Basic Laws of the two SARs.
1 Claimed province: The People's Republic of China claims the island of Taiwan and its surrounding islets, including Penghu, as Taiwan Province. (Kinmen and the Matsu Islands are claimed by the PRC as part of its Fujian Province. Pratas and Itu Aba are claimed by the PRC as part of Guangdong and Hainan provinces respectively.) The territory is controlled by the Republic of China (ROC, commonly called "Taiwan").

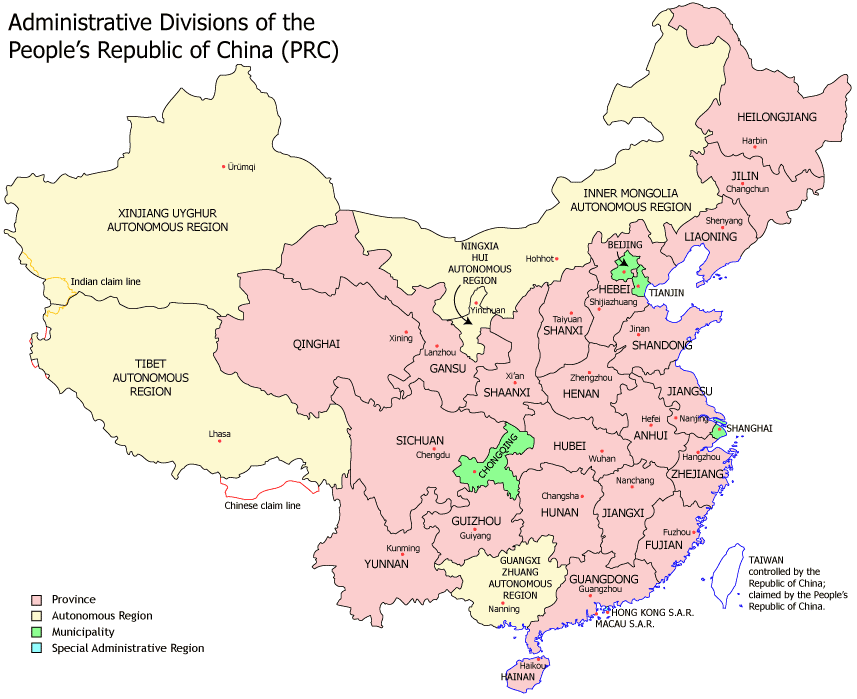

=== Prefectural level (2nd) ===
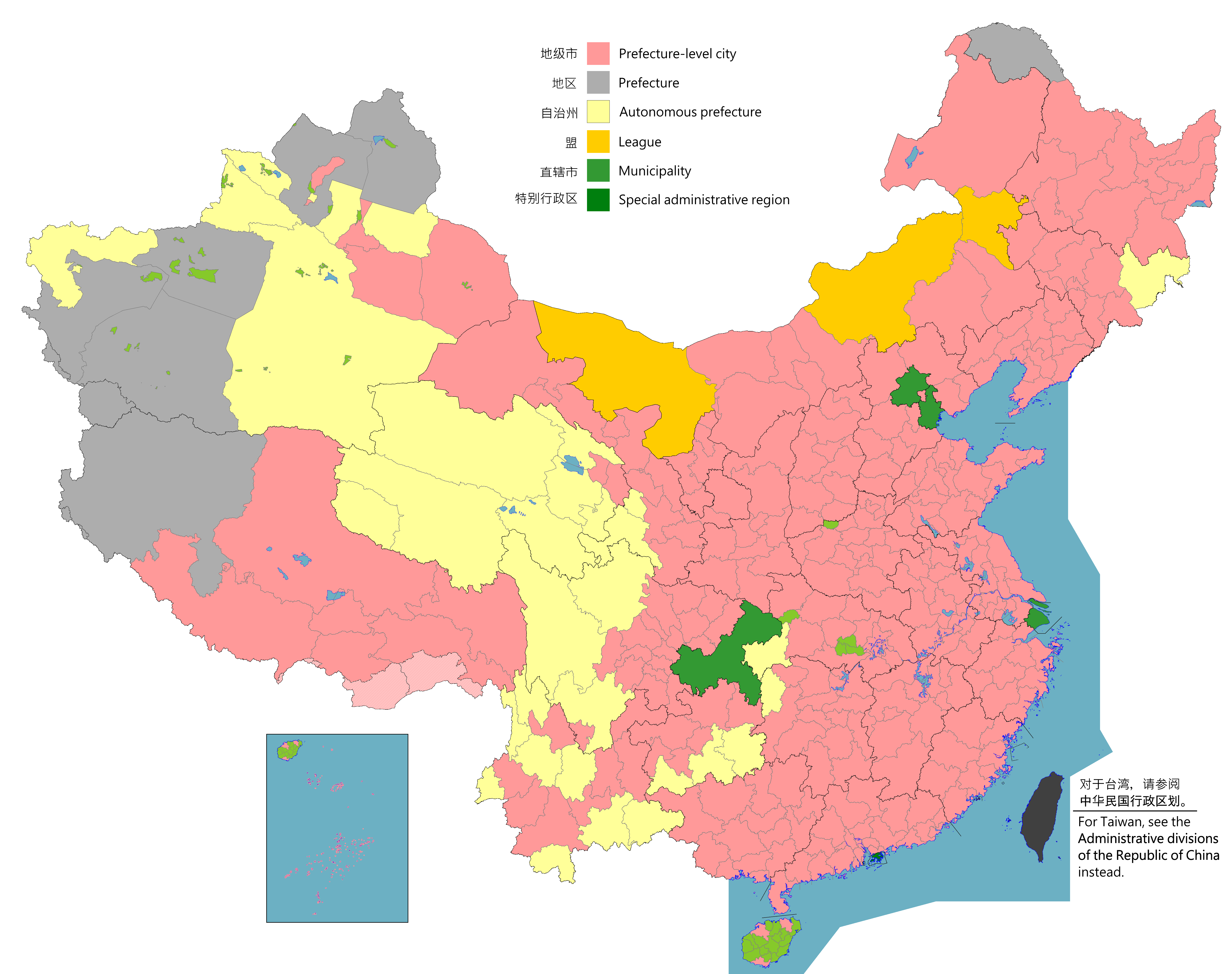
Map of China's prefectural level divisions

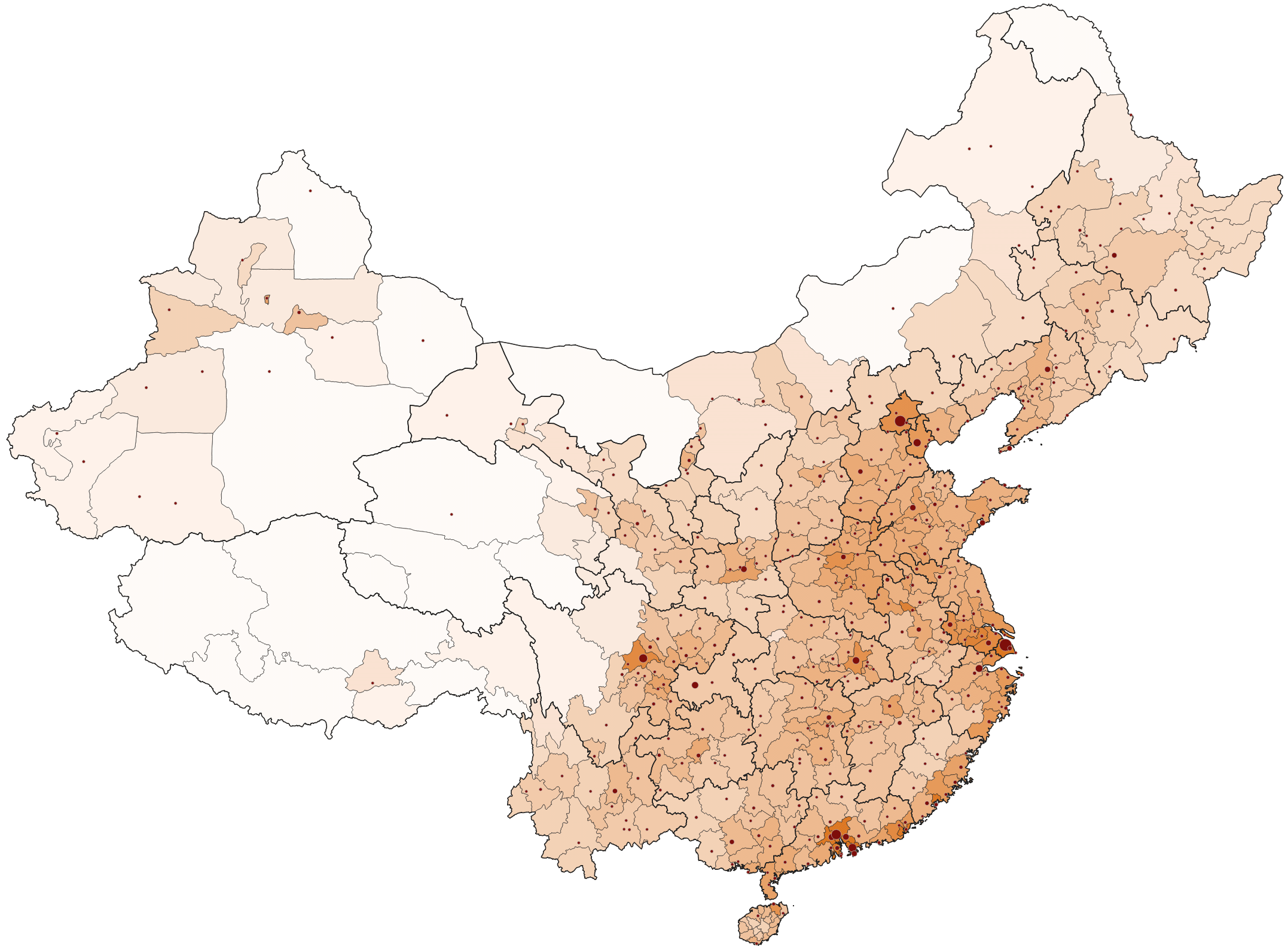
Map of China's population density on prefecture level, based on the official 2022 census

Prefectural level divisions or second-level divisions are the second level of the administrative structure. Most provinces are divided into only prefecture-level cities and contain no other second level administrative units. Of the 22 provinces and 5 autonomous regions, only 3 provinces (Yunnan, Guizhou, Qinghai) and 1 autonomous region (Xinjiang) have more than three second-level or prefectural-level divisions that are not prefecture-level cities. As of June 2020, there were 339 prefectural level divisions:

7 Prefectures: formerly the dominant second level division, thus this administrative level is often called "prefectural level". They were mostly replaced by prefecture-level cities from 1983 to the 1990s. Today, prefectures exist only in Heilongjiang, Tibet and Xinjiang.
30 Autonomous prefectures: prefectures with one or more designated ethnic minorities, mostly in China's western regions.
299 prefecture-level cities: the largest number of prefectural-level divisions, generally composed of an urban center and surrounding rural areas much larger than the urban core and thus not "cities" but municipalities in the strict sense of the term
3 Leagues: effectively the same as prefectures, but found only in Inner Mongolia. Like prefectures, leagues have mostly been replaced with prefecture-level cities. The unique name is a holdover from earlier forms of administration in Mongolia.

=== County level (3rd) ===
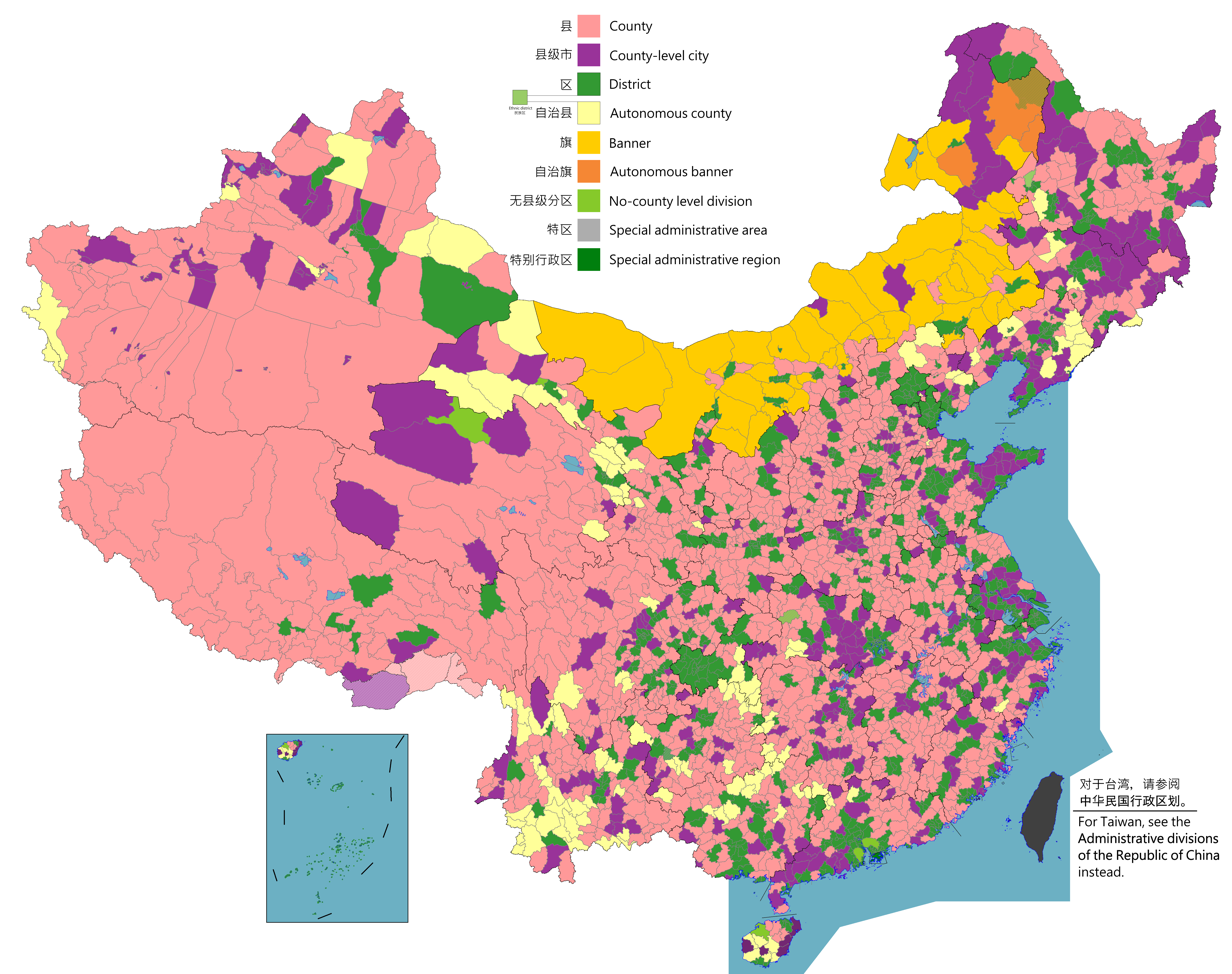
Map of China's county-level divisions

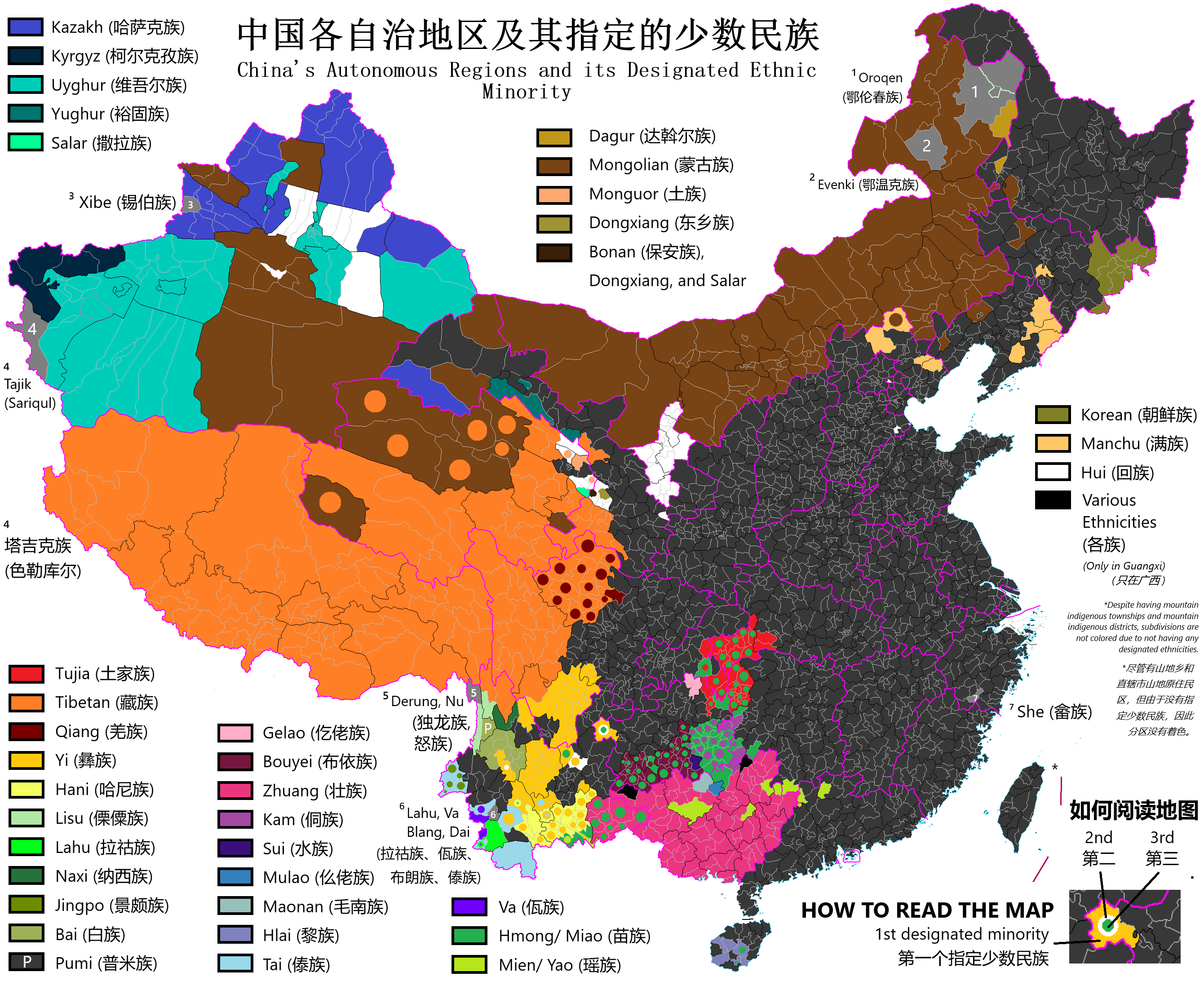
China's Autonomous Regions and their Designated Ethnic Minority

As of 18 August 2015, there were 2,852 county-level divisions:

1,408 Counties: the most common county-level divisions, continuously in existence since the Warring States period, much earlier than any other level of government in China. Xian is often translated as "district" or "prefecture".
117 Autonomous counties: counties with one or more designated ethnic minorities, analogous to autonomous regions and prefectures
360 County-level cities: similar to prefecture-level cities, covering both urban and rural areas. It was popular for counties to become county-level cities in the 1990s, though this has since been halted.
913 Districts: formerly the subdivisions of urban areas, consisting of built-up areas only. Recently many counties have become districts, so that districts are now often just like counties, with towns, villages, and farmland.
49 Banners: the same as counties except in the name, a holdover from earlier forms of administration in Mongolia
3 Autonomous banners: the same as autonomous counties except in the name, a holdover from earlier forms of administration in Mongolia
1 Forestry area (Chinese: 林区; pinyin: línqū): a special county-level forestry district located in Hubei province
1 Special district (Chinese: 特区; pinyin: tèqū): a special county-level division located in Guizhou province

=== Township level (4th) ===
==== Township-level (4th) subdivisions ====
13,749 Townships: in smaller rural areas division they are divided into this subject
1,098 Ethnic townships: small rural areas divisions designated for one or more ethnic minorities are divided into this subject
19,322 Towns: in larger rural areas division they are divided into this subject
6,686 Subdistricts: in a small urban areas division they are divided into this subject
1 County-controlled districts are a vestigial level of government. These once represented an extra level of government between the county- and township levels. Today there are very few of these remaining and they are gradually being phased out.
181 Sums are the same as townships, but are unique to Inner Mongolia.
The 1 Ethnic sum is the same as an ethnic township, but is unique to Inner Mongolia.

=== Basic level autonomy (5th) ===
The basic level autonomy serves as an organizational division (census, mail system) and does not have much importance in political representative power. Basic local divisions such as neighborhoods and communities are not informal, but have defined boundaries and elected heads (one per area):

In urban areas, every subdistrict of a district of a city administers many communities or residential committees. Each of them has a residential committee to administer the dwellers of that neighborhood or community. Rural areas are organized into village committees or villager groups. A "village" in this case can either be a natural village, one that spontaneously and naturally exists, or a virtual village, which is a bureaucratic entity.

==== Village-level (5th) subdivisions ====
80,717 Residential committees (居民委员会; jūmínwěiyuánhuì)
Residential groups (居民小组; jūmínxiǎozǔ)
Communities (社区 / 社; shèqū / shè)
623,669 Village committees (村民委员会; cūnmínwěiyuánhuì)
Village groups (村民小组; cūnmínxiǎozǔ)
Administrative Villages / Villages (行政村 / 村; xíngzhèngcūn / cūn)
Gaqa (嘎查; gāchá)
Ranch (牧委会; mùwěihuì)
Hamlet (屯; tún)

=== Special cases ===
Five cities formally on prefectural level have a special status in regard to planning and budget. They are separately listed in the five-year and annual state plans on the same level as provinces and national ministries, making them economically independent of their provincial government. These cities specifically designated in the state plan (Chinese: 计划单列市) are

- Dalian (Liaoning)
- Ningbo (Zhejiang)
- Qingdao (Shandong)
- Shenzhen (Guangdong)
- Xiamen (Fujian)

In terms of budget authority, their governments have the de facto status of a province, but their legislative organs (National People's Congress and Chinese People's Political Consultative Conference) and other authorities not related to the economy are on the level of a prefecture and under the leadership of the province.

Some other large prefecture-level cities, known as sub-provincial cities, are half a level below a province. The mayors of these cities have the same rank as a vice governor of a province, and their district governments are half a rank higher than those of normal districts. The capitals of some provinces (seat of provincial government) are sub-provincial cities. In addition to the five cities specifically designated in the state plan, sub-provincial cities are:

- Harbin (Heilongjiang)
- Changchun (Jilin)
- Shenyang (Liaoning)
- Jinan (Shandong)
- Nanjing (Jiangsu)
- Hangzhou (Zhejiang)
- Guangzhou (Guangdong)
- Wuhan (Hubei)
- Chengdu (Sichuan)
- Xi'an (Shaanxi)

A similar case exists with some county-level cities. Some county-level cities are given more autonomy. These cities are known as sub-prefecture-level cities, meaning that they are given a level of power higher than a county, but still lower than a prefecture. Such cities are also half a level higher than what they would normally be. Sub-prefecture-level cities are often not put into any prefecture (i.e. they are directly administered by their province). Examples of sub-prefecture-level cities include Jiyuan (Henan province), Xiantao, Qianjiang and Tianmen (Hubei), Golmud (Qinghai), Manzhouli (Inner Mongolia), Shihanza, Tumushuk, Aral, and Wujiaqu (Xinjiang).

Some districts are also placed at half a level higher that what it should be. Examples are Pudong, Shanghai and Binhai, Tianjin. Although its status as a district of a municipality would define it as prefecture-level, the district head of Pudong is given sub-provincial powers. In other words, it is half a level higher than what it would normally be.

==== Special cases subdivisions ====
1 Sub-provincial autonomous prefecture
15 Sub-provincial cities
2 Sub-provincial new areas
8 Sub-prefecture-level cities

== Ambiguity of the word "city" in China ==
The Chinese word "市" (shì) is usually loosely translated into English as "city". However, it has several different meanings due to the complexity of the administrative divisions used in China. Despite being urban or having urban centers, the SARs are almost never referred to as "Hong Kong City"/"Macau City" in contemporary Chinese and thus are not covered by the description below. Urban settlements are better known as Towns (镇, zhèn) but if they grow in size, they get upgraded to a City (市) meaning they can control the surrounding land directly and its name will now be referred as a District (市区, shì qū).

By its political level, when a "city" is referred to, it can be a:

- LV 1 (provincial-level):
  - Municipality of China, literally "direct-controlled city" in Chinese, there being actually four: Beijing, Tianjin, Shanghai and Chongqing
- LV 2 (prefecture-level):
  - Sub-provincial city, for example, Shenzhen in Guangdong Province
  - Prefecture-level city, for example, Shijiazhuang, capital of Hebei Province
- LV 3 (county-level):
  - Sub-prefecture-level city, for example, Jiyuan (directly under the administration of Henan Province)
  - County-level city, for example, Yiwu (under the administration of the prefecture-level city of Jinhua)

By its actual area and population, it can be:

- Province-like, which is the municipality of Chongqing, a merger of 4 former prefectures and similar to the former Eastern-Sichuan province.
- Prefecture-like, which are the other three municipalities and almost all prefectural-level cities, usually 10–1,000 times larger than the urban center and a conglomeration of several counties and county-level cities. Some of them in sparsely populated areas like Hulunbuir are even larger than Chongqing but have a population comparable to that of prefectures.
- County-like, which is all sub-prefecture-level and some county-level cities, and several extremely simple prefecture-level cities (Jiayuguan, Xiamen, Haikou, etc).
- Not substantially larger than urban establishment: some county-level cities, plus some members of the previous category. However, county-level cities converted from counties are unlikely to belong here. Shanghai, despite being prefecture-like in size, belongs here due to its subway already extending beyond municipality limits. Some other economically prosperous prefecture-level cities are also provoking inter-prefecture urban integration, although they still possess (and never intend to eliminate) large swaths of rural area.

When used in the statistical data, the word "city" may have three different meanings:

- The area administrated by the city. For the municipality, the sub-provincial city, or the prefecture-level city, a "city" in this sense includes all of the counties, county-level cities, and city districts that the city governs. For the Sub-prefecture-level city or the County-level city, it includes all of the subdistricts, towns and townships that it has.
- The area comprising its urban city districts and suburb city districts. The difference between the urban district and the suburb districts is that an urban district comprises only the subdistricts, while a suburb district also has towns and townships to govern rural areas. In some sense, this definition is approximately the metropolitan area. This definition is not applied to the sub-prefecture-level city and the county-level city since they do not have city districts under them.
  - Somewhat bizarrely, some districts such as Haidian District also possess towns. They have been treated clearly as urban districts for decades, but not from the inception, some areas are rural but other areas form an inseparable part of the central city.
- The urban area. Sometimes the urban area is referred as Chinese: 市区; pinyin: shìqū. For the municipality, the sub-provincial city, and the prefecture-level city, it comprises the urban city district and the adjacent subdistricts of the suburb city districts. For the sub-prefecture-level city and the county-level city, only central subdistricts are included. This definition is close to the strict meaning of "city" in western countries.

The choice of definition of "city" used for statistical data of Chinese cities can lead to different results. For example, Shanghai is the largest city in China by population in the urban area but is smaller than Chongqing by the population within the administration area.

== History ==
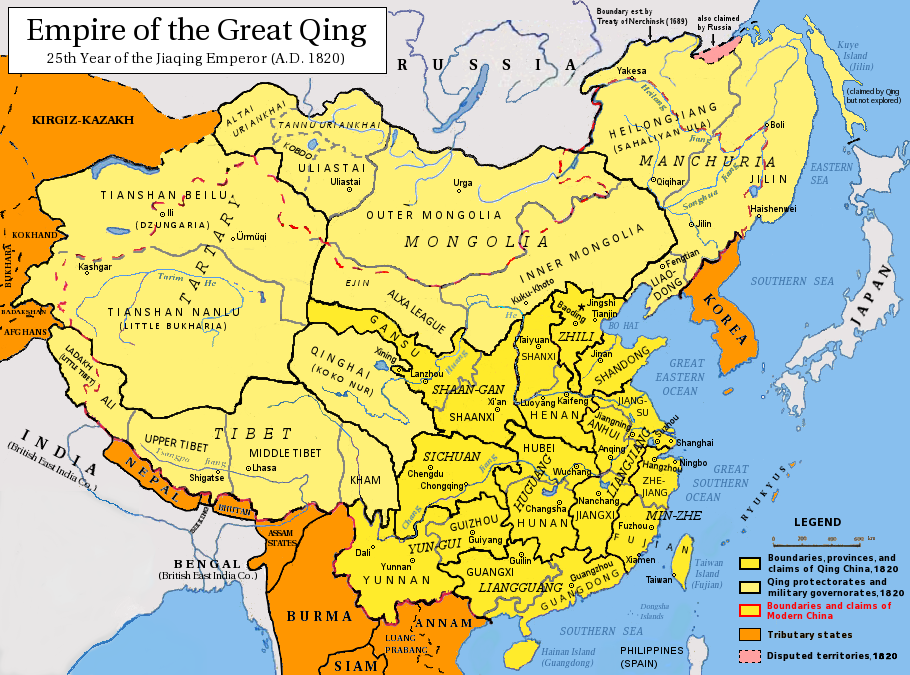
Qing China in 1820, with provinces in yellow, military governorates and protectorates in light yellow, tributary states in orange

Before the establishment of the Qin dynasty, China was ruled by a network of kings, nobles, and tribes. The rivalry of these groups culminated in the Warring States period, and the state of Qin eventually emerged dominant.

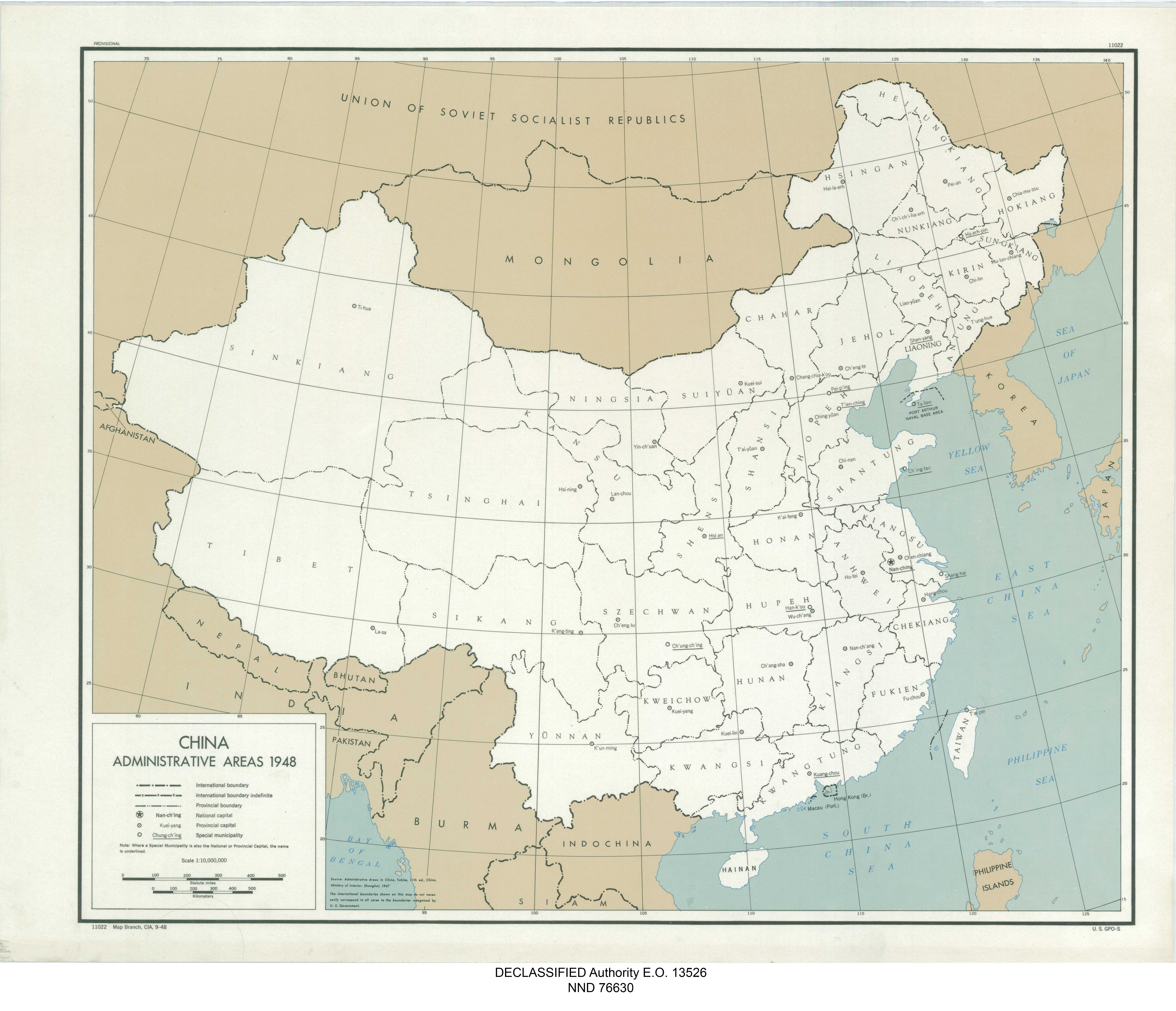
Administrative units of China in 1948 (CIA map)

The Qin dynasty was determined not to allow China to fall back into disunity, and therefore designed the first hierarchical administrative divisions in China, based on two levels: jùn commanderies and xiàn counties. The Han dynasty that came immediately after added zhōu (usually translated as "provinces") as the third level on top, forming a three-tier structure.

The Sui and Tang dynasties abolished commanderies, and added circuits (dào, later lù under the Song and Jin) on top, maintaining a three-tier system that lasted through the 13th century. (As a second-level division, zhou are translated as "prefectures".) The Mongol-established Yuan dynasty introduced the modern precursors to provinces, bringing the number of levels to four. This system was then kept more or less intact until the Qing dynasty, the last imperial dynasty to rule China.

The Republic of China streamlined the levels to just provinces and counties in 1928 and made the first attempt to extend political administration beyond the county level by establishing townships below counties. This was also the system officially adopted by the People's Republic of China in 1949, which defined the administrative divisions of China as three levels: provinces, counties, and townships.

In practice, however, more levels were inserted. The ROC government soon learned that it was not feasible for a province to directly govern tens and sometimes hundreds of counties. Started from Jiangxi province in 1935, prefectures were later inserted between provinces and counties. They continued to be ubiquitously applied by the PRC government to nearly all areas of China until the 1980s. Since then, most of the prefectures were converted into prefecture-level cities. Greater administrative areas were inserted on top of provinces by the PRC government, but they were soon abolished, in 1954. District public offices were inserted between counties and townships; once ubiquitous as well, they are currently being abolished and very few remain.

The most recent major developments have been the establishment of Chongqing as a municipality and the creation of Hong Kong and Macau as special administrative regions.

== Reform ==
In recent years there have been calls to reform the administrative divisions and levels of China. Rumours of an impending major reform have also spread through various online bulletin boards.

The district public offices is an ongoing reform to remove an extra level of administration from between the county and township levels. There have also been calls to abolish the prefecture-level, and some provinces have transferred some of the power prefectures currently hold to the counties they govern. There are also calls to reduce the size of the provinces. The ultimate goal is to reduce the different administration levels from five to three (Provincial level, County level, Village level), reducing the amount of corruption as well as the number of government workers, in order to lower the budget.

== See also ==
- Regions of China
- Metropolitan cities of China
- Secession in China
- Language Atlas of China
- Tiao-kuai
- New areas
