= Qahar Right Middle Banner =

Qahar Right Middle Banner 察哈尔右翼中旗 • ᠴᠠᠬᠠᠷ ᠪᠠᠷᠠᠭᠤᠨ ᠭᠠᠷᠤᠨ ᠳᠤᠮᠳᠠᠳᠤ ᠬᠣᠰᠢᠭᠤ
- County
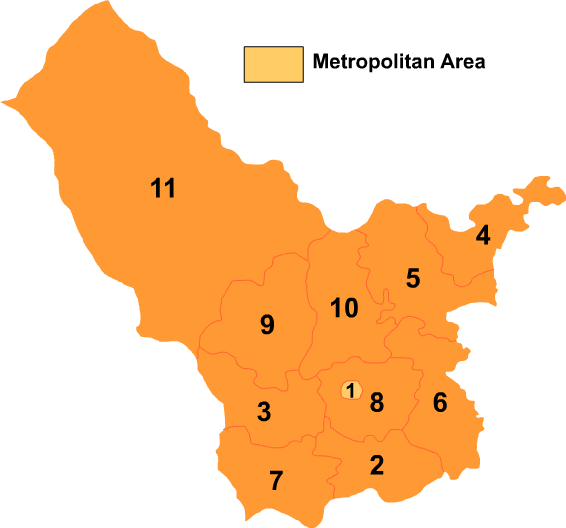
- Ulanqab's divisions: Chahar Right Middle Banner is 9 on this map

- Location in Inner Mongolia Chahar RMB (China)
- Coordinates: 41°17′N 112°38′E
- Country: China
- Autonomous region: Inner Mongolia
- Prefecture-level city: Ulaan Chab
- Banner seat: Hobor

Area
  - Total: 4,178 km^{2} (1,613 sq mi)
- Elevation: 1,734 m (5,689 ft)

Population (2020)
  - Total: 86,108
  - Density: 20.61/km^{2} (53.38/sq mi)
- Time zone: UTC+8 (China Standard)
- Website: www.cyzq.gov.cn

Qahar Right Middle Banner

Chinese name
- Simplified Chinese: 察哈尔右翼中旗
- Traditional Chinese: 察哈爾右翼中旗
Transcriptions
Standard Mandarin
- Hanyu Pinyin: Cháhā'ěr Yòuyì Zhōngqí

Mongolian name
- Mongolian Cyrillic: Цахар баруун гарын дундад хошуу
- Mongolian script: ᠴᠠᠬᠠᠷ ᠪᠠᠷᠠᠭᠤᠨ ᠭᠠᠷᠤᠨ ᠳᠤᠮᠳᠠᠳᠤ ᠬᠣᠰᠢᠭᠤ
Transcriptions
- SASM/GNC: Čaqar Baraɣun Ɣarun Dumdadu qosiɣu

Chahar Right Middle Banner (Mongolian: ᠴᠠᠬᠠᠷ ᠪᠠᠷᠠᠭᠤᠨ ᠭᠠᠷᠤᠨ ᠳᠤᠮᠳᠠᠳᠤ ᠬᠣᠰᠢᠭᠤ; Chinese: 察哈尔右翼中旗) is a banner (county equivalent) of Inner Mongolia, China, bordered by Chahar Right Back Banner to the east, Zhuozi County to the south, and Siziwang Banner to the northwest. It is under the administration of Ulaan Chab City.

== Administrative divisions ==
Chahar Right Middle Banner is made up of 5 towns, 4 townships, and 2 sums.

Name	Simplified Chinese	Hanyu Pinyin	Mongolian (Hudum Script)	Mongolian (Cyrillic)	Administrative division code
Towns
Hobor Town	科布尔镇	Kēbù'ěr Zhèn	ᠬᠥᠭᠡᠪᠥᠷ ᠪᠠᠯᠭᠠᠰᠤ	Хөөвөр балгас	150927103
Teseg Town	铁沙盖镇	Tiěshāgài Zhèn	ᠲᠡᠰᠬᠢ ᠪᠠᠯᠭᠠᠰᠤ	Тасхий балгас	150927104
Huangyangcheng Town	黄羊城镇	Huángyángchéng Zhèn	ᠬᠤᠸᠠᠩ ᠶᠠᠩ ᠴᠧᠩ ᠪᠠᠯᠭᠠᠰᠤ	Хуан ян цэн балгас	150927105
Guangyilong Town	广益隆镇	Guǎngyìlóng Zhèn	ᠭᠤᠸᠠᠩ ᠢ ᠯᠦᠩ ᠪᠠᠯᠭᠠᠰᠤ	Гуан И лүн балгас	150927106
Ust Town	乌素图镇	Wūsùtú Zhèn	ᠤᠰᠤᠲᠤ ᠪᠠᠯᠭᠠᠰᠤ	Уст балгас	150927107
Townships
Datan Township	大滩乡	Dàtān Xiāng	ᠳ᠋ᠠ ᠲᠠᠨ ᠰᠢᠶᠠᠩ	Да дан шиян	150927216
Hongpan Township	宏盘乡	Hóngpán Xiāng	ᠬᠤᠩ ᠫᠠᠨ ᠰᠢᠶᠠᠩ	Хон пан шиян	150927217
Bayan Township	巴音乡	Bāyīn Xiāng	ᠪᠠᠶᠠᠨ ᠰᠢᠶᠠᠩ	Баян шиян	150927218
Tuchengzi Township	土城子乡	Tǔchéngzi Xiāng	ᠲᠤ ᠴᠧᠩ ᠽᠢ ᠰᠢᠶᠠᠩ	Ад цэн зи шиян	150927221
Sums
Hure Sum	库伦苏木	Kùlún Sūmù	ᠬᠦᠷᠢᠶ᠎ᠡ ᠰᠤᠮᠤ	Хүрээ сум	150927219
Ulan Haya Sum	乌兰哈页苏木	Wūlánhāyè Sūmù	ᠤᠯᠠᠭᠠᠨᠬᠠᠶᠠᠭ᠎ᠠ ᠰᠤᠮᠤ	Улаанухаяа сум	150927220

Other: Huiten Xil Park Management Committee (辉腾锡勒园区管理委员会)

== Climate ==
Climate data for Chahar Right Middle Banner, elevation 1,737 m (5,699 ft), (1991–2020 normals, extremes 1991–present)
Month	Jan	Feb	Mar	Apr	May	Jun	Jul	Aug	Sep	Oct	Nov	Dec	Year
Record high °C (°F)	10.1 (50.2)	11.5 (52.7)	18.3 (64.9)	26.9 (80.4)	30.3 (86.5)	34.1 (93.4)	33.5 (92.3)	30.2 (86.4)	29.4 (84.9)	21.7 (71.1)	13.3 (55.9)	7.9 (46.2)	34.1 (93.4)
Mean daily maximum °C (°F)	−8.3 (17.1)	−4.1 (24.6)	2.6 (36.7)	10.9 (51.6)	17.5 (63.5)	22.0 (71.6)	24.1 (75.4)	22.5 (72.5)	17.2 (63.0)	9.4 (48.9)	0.2 (32.4)	−6.9 (19.6)	8.9 (48.1)
Daily mean °C (°F)	−15.0 (5.0)	−11.1 (12.0)	−4.1 (24.6)	4.2 (39.6)	11.0 (51.8)	16.0 (60.8)	18.3 (64.9)	16.4 (61.5)	10.8 (51.4)	3.0 (37.4)	−5.9 (21.4)	−12.9 (8.8)	2.6 (36.6)
Mean daily minimum °C (°F)	−20.0 (−4.0)	−16.7 (1.9)	−10.1 (13.8)	−2.4 (27.7)	4.1 (39.4)	9.3 (48.7)	12.2 (54.0)	10.4 (50.7)	4.9 (40.8)	−2.4 (27.7)	−10.8 (12.6)	−17.7 (0.1)	−3.3 (26.1)
Record low °C (°F)	−33.0 (−27.4)	−33.5 (−28.3)	−27.6 (−17.7)	−17.5 (0.5)	−9.8 (14.4)	−1.2 (29.8)	2.5 (36.5)	0.2 (32.4)	−7.2 (19.0)	−21.0 (−5.8)	−34.6 (−30.3)	−32.2 (−26.0)	−34.6 (−30.3)
Average precipitation mm (inches)	1.9 (0.07)	2.9 (0.11)	7.4 (0.29)	16.2 (0.64)	30.4 (1.20)	51.4 (2.02)	94.6 (3.72)	64.7 (2.55)	42.6 (1.68)	20.2 (0.80)	6.8 (0.27)	2.5 (0.10)	341.6 (13.45)
Average precipitation days (≥ 0.1 mm)	4.2	4.8	6.4	6.1	8.1	12.0	13.9	12.4	9.5	6.2	5.9	5.1	94.6
Average snowy days	7.5	7.5	8.7	5.4	1.7	0	0	0	0.6	4.4	7.7	8.8	52.3
Average relative humidity (%)	63	56	48	41	42	52	64	66	61	59	61	63	56
Mean monthly sunshine hours	221.7	222.4	263.5	278.5	309.9	287.5	285.8	276.3	246.3	246.7	212.3	209.6	3,060.5
Percentage possible sunshine	74	73	71	69	69	64	63	65	67	73	73	74	70
Source: China Meteorological Administration
