= Dorbod Banner =

Dorbod Banner 四子王旗 · ᠳᠥᠷᠪᠡᠳ ᠬᠣᠰᠢᠭᠤ Siziwang
- Banner
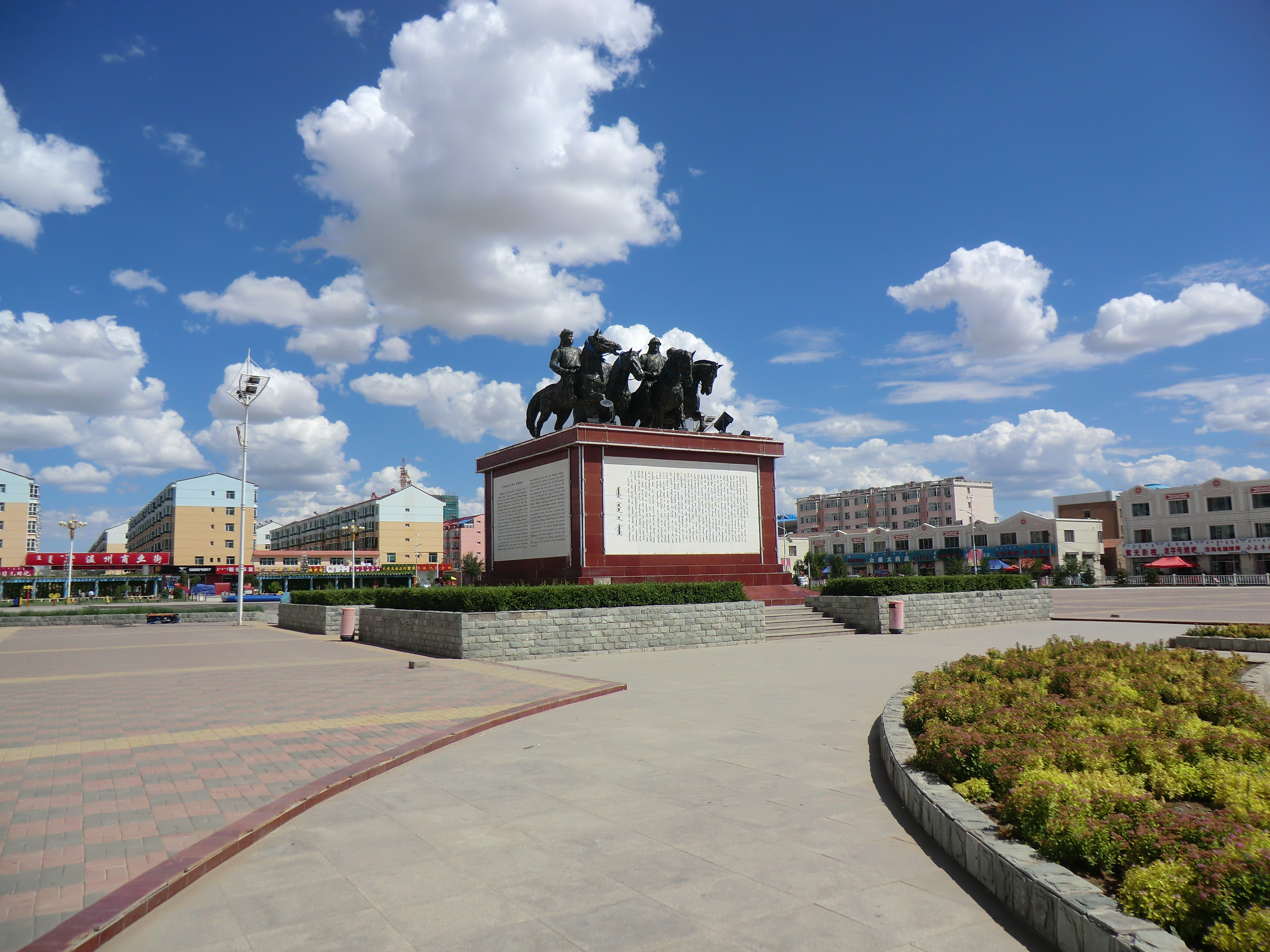

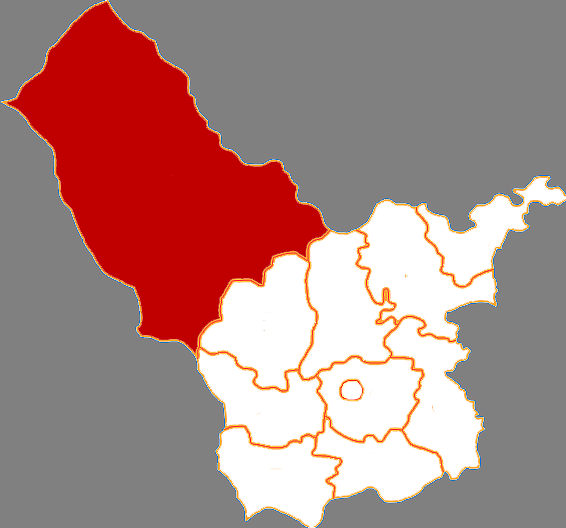
- Dorbod in Ulanqab

- Ulanqab in Inner Mongolia

- Location in Inner Mongolia Dorbod (China)
- Coordinates: 41°31′59″N 111°42′24″E
- Country: China
- Autonomous region: Inner Mongolia
- Prefecture-level city: Ulanqab
- Banner seat: Ulan Hua

Area
  - Total: 25,513 km^{2} (9,851 sq mi)

Population (2020)
  - Total: 129,372
  - Density: 5.0708/km^{2} (13.133/sq mi)
- Time zone: UTC+8 (China Standard)
- Website: www.szwq.gov.cn

Dorbod Banner

Chinese name
- Chinese: 四子王旗
Transcriptions
Standard Mandarin
- Hanyu Pinyin: Sìzǐwáng Qí

Mongolian name
- Mongolian Cyrillic: Дөрвөд хошуу
- Mongolian script: ᠳᠥᠷᠪᠡᠳ ᠬᠣᠰᠢᠭᠤ
Transcriptions
- SASM/GNC: Dörbed qosiɣu

Dorbod Banner or Siziwang Banner (Mongolian: ᠳᠥᠷᠪᠡᠳ ᠬᠣᠰᠢᠭᠤ; Chinese: 四子王旗) is a banner (county equivalent) in Ulanqab, Inner Mongolia, China, bordering Mongolia's Dornogovi Province to the northwest. It is located about 80 km (50 mi) north of Hohhot, the capital of Inner Mongolia.

The banner spans 25,513 square kilometres (9,851 mi^{2}), and has a population of 129,372 as of 2020. Its seat of government is located in Wulanhua.

== Toponymy ==
The Chinese name for the banner siziwang, literally "four princes", derives from the area's historic rule by four brothers. The Mongolian name for the banner dorbed means "of four".

== History ==
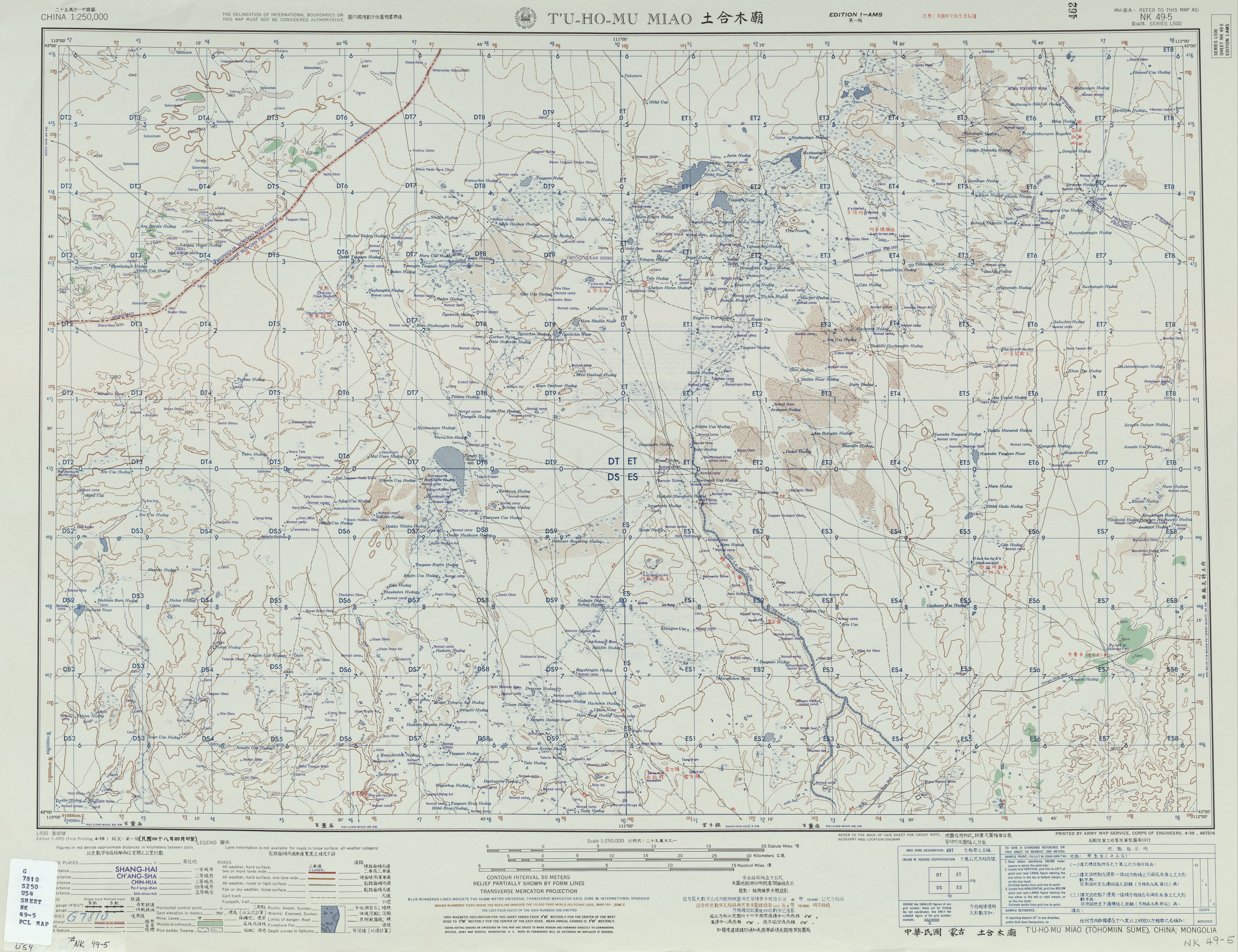
T'u-ho-mu Miao (土合木庙) / Töhömiin Süme (1959)

The area of Dorbod Banner was ruled by four Mongol brothers, Sengge (Сэнгэ, Chinese: 僧格), Suonuobu (Chinese: 索諾布), Bonpo (Бумба, Chinese: 鄂木布) and Yi'erzhamu (Chinese: 伊爾扎木), who were descendants of Hasar, a brother of Genghis Khan. They led their tribe in participating in the Manchu Qing Dynasty's conquest of Ming China in the early 17th century. In recognition of their service, the Qing court made Emubu the Duoluo Commandery Prince (Chinese: 多羅郡王) in 1649 and settled their tribe in the area of modern Siziwang Banner. The title was hereditary and passed through fourteen of his descendants before the Chinese Communist Party abolished all hereditary titles in Inner Mongolia in 1949. The last prince, Sudanamuchaogeji (Chinese: 蘇達那木朝格吉), died as a private citizen in 1957. There is a sculpture of the four original princes in Wulanhua, erected in 2003.

== Geography ==
To its east lies Sonid Right Banner, Qahar Right Rear Banner, and Qahar Right Middle Banner. To its south lies Wuchuan County and Zhuozi County. To its west lies Darhan Muminggan United Banner. Its north is formed by a 104 kilometres (65 mi) border with Mongolia.

Its seat of government, the town of Wulanhua, is located 105 kilometres (65 mi) away from Hohhot, and 270 kilometres (170 mi) away from Erlianhot.

The banner is located along the northern foothills of the Yin Mountains, and has an average elevation of 1,400 metres (4,600 ft). Most of the banner's area is grassland.

=== Climate ===
The banner experiences an average of 250 millimetres (9.8 in) to 300 millimetres (12 in) of precipitation annually. Its average annual temperature is 3 °C (37 °F).

Climate data for Dorbod Banner, elevation 1,445 m (4,741 ft), (1991–2020 normals, extremes 1981–2010)
Month	Jan	Feb	Mar	Apr	May	Jun	Jul	Aug	Sep	Oct	Nov	Dec	Year
Record high °C (°F)	8.8 (47.8)	14.9 (58.8)	20.9 (69.6)	28.7 (83.7)	32.3 (90.1)	36.5 (97.7)	36.9 (98.4)	33.5 (92.3)	32.2 (90.0)	24.3 (75.7)	17.9 (64.2)	12.4 (54.3)	36.9 (98.4)
Mean daily maximum °C (°F)	−6.7 (19.9)	−2.3 (27.9)	4.9 (40.8)	13.5 (56.3)	20.0 (68.0)	24.8 (76.6)	26.9 (80.4)	24.9 (76.8)	19.7 (67.5)	12.0 (53.6)	2.6 (36.7)	−5.0 (23.0)	11.3 (52.3)
Daily mean °C (°F)	−14.3 (6.3)	−9.9 (14.2)	−2.2 (28.0)	6.3 (43.3)	13.2 (55.8)	18.3 (64.9)	20.7 (69.3)	18.5 (65.3)	12.8 (55.0)	5.0 (41.0)	−4.2 (24.4)	−11.8 (10.8)	4.4 (39.9)
Mean daily minimum °C (°F)	−19.9 (−3.8)	−15.7 (3.7)	−8.2 (17.2)	−0.4 (31.3)	6.2 (43.2)	11.7 (53.1)	14.7 (58.5)	12.6 (54.7)	7.0 (44.6)	−0.4 (31.3)	−9.1 (15.6)	−16.9 (1.6)	−1.5 (29.3)
Record low °C (°F)	−34.2 (−29.6)	−30.8 (−23.4)	−27.7 (−17.9)	−15.0 (5.0)	−7.4 (18.7)	0.5 (32.9)	6.4 (43.5)	1.9 (35.4)	−5.4 (22.3)	−14.1 (6.6)	−27.1 (−16.8)	−32.7 (−26.9)	−34.2 (−29.6)
Average precipitation mm (inches)	3.5 (0.14)	4.5 (0.18)	7.9 (0.31)	13.0 (0.51)	29.9 (1.18)	44.5 (1.75)	81.8 (3.22)	63.6 (2.50)	43.7 (1.72)	18.7 (0.74)	7.7 (0.30)	4.3 (0.17)	323.1 (12.72)
Average precipitation days (≥ 0.1 mm)	5.4	4.9	5.7	5.0	6.8	11.1	11.4	11.1	9.0	5.4	5.8	6.1	87.7
Average snowy days	8.7	7.2	7.3	3.7	1.0	0	0	0	0.3	3.1	7.4	9.0	47.7
Average relative humidity (%)	59	53	43	35	37	46	57	60	56	52	55	58	51
Mean monthly sunshine hours	212.9	213.6	260.0	275.4	304.1	284.7	298.9	288.0	255.4	250.6	209.1	197.9	3,050.6
Percentage possible sunshine	72	71	70	69	67	63	66	68	69	74	72	70	69
Source: China Meteorological Administration

== Administrative divisions ==
Dorbod Banner is divided into 5 towns, 3 townships, and 5 sums.

Name	Simplified Chinese	Hanyu Pinyin	Mongolian (Hudum Script)	Mongolian (Cyrillic)	Administrative division code
Towns
Ulan Hua Town	乌兰花镇	Wūlánhuā Zhèn	ᠤᠯᠠᠭᠠᠨᠬᠤᠸᠠ ᠪᠠᠯᠭᠠᠰᠤ	Улаанухаа балгас	150929100
Jishengtai Town	吉生太镇	Jíshēngtài Zhèn	ᠵᠢᠢ ᠱᠧᠩ ᠲᠠᠢ ᠪᠠᠯᠭᠠᠰᠤ	Жий шинтэй балгас	150929101
Huret Town	库伦图镇	Kùlúntú Zhèn	ᠬᠦᠷᠢᠶᠡᠲᠦ ᠪᠠᠯᠭᠠᠰᠤ	Хүрээт балгас	150929102
Gongjitang Town	供济堂镇	Gōngjìtáng Zhèn	ᠭᠦᠩ ᠵᠢᠢ ᠲᠠᠩ ᠪᠠᠯᠭᠠᠰᠤ	Хүн жий даан балгас	150929103
Bayan Qogt Town	白音朝克图镇	Báiyīncháokètú Zhèn	ᠪᠠᠶᠠᠨᠴᠣᠭᠲᠤ ᠪᠠᠯᠭᠠᠰᠤ	Баянцогт балгас	150929104
Townships
Dongbahao Township	东八号乡	Dōngbāhào Xiāng	ᠳ᠋ᠦᠩ ᠪᠠ ᠬᠣᠤ ᠰᠢᠶᠠᠩ	Дүн ба хоо шиян	150929204
Hujirt Township	忽鸡图乡	Hūjītú Xiāng	ᠬᠤᠵᠢᠷᠲᠤ ᠰᠢᠶᠠᠩ	Хужирт шиян	150929205
Daheihe Township	大黑河乡	Dàhēihé Xiāng	ᠳ᠋ᠠ ᠾᠧᠢ ᠾᠧ ᠰᠢᠶᠠᠩ	Да гей ге шиян	150929206
Sums
Honggor Sum	红格尔苏木	Hónggé'ěr Sūmù	ᠬᠣᠩᠭᠣᠷ ᠰᠤᠮᠤ	Хонгор сум	150929200
Janggan Sum	江岸苏木	Jiāng'àn Sūmù	ᠵᠠᠩᠭᠠᠨ ᠰᠤᠮᠤ	Зангаа сум	150929201
Qagan Bulag Sum	查干补力格苏木	Chágànbǔlìgé Sūmù	ᠴᠠᠭᠠᠨᠪᠤᠯᠠᠭ ᠰᠤᠮᠤ	Цагаанбулаг сум	150929202
Nomgan Sum	脑木更苏木	Nǎomùgèng Sūmù	ᠨᠣᠮᠣᠭᠠᠨ ᠰᠤᠮᠤ	Номгон сум	150929203
Bayan Obo Sum	巴音敖包苏木	Bāyīn'áobāo Sūmù	ᠪᠠᠶᠠᠨᠣ᠋ᠪᠣᠭ᠎ᠠ ᠰᠤᠮᠤ	Баянөваа сум	150929207

Other: Ulan Pasture (乌兰牧场)

== Demographics ==
As of 2009, the banner is home to 216,990 people, up from the 180,568 reported in the 2000 Census.

The banner's ethnic minorities include 18,902 Mongols (8.71% of the total population), 1,086 Manchus (0.50%), and 837 Hui people (0.39%).

== Economy ==
Mineral deposits in the banner include gold, copper, nickel, manganese, fluorite, gypsum, coal, and thenardite.

== Spacecraft landing site ==
The banner served as the landing sites for China's Shenzhou program.

A pasture known as Amugulang, located in Honggor Sum, about 60 km (37 mi) north of Wulanhua, served as the landing site for the Shenzhou-6 spacecraft. A specially constructed 64.69 km (40.20 mi) road runs from Wulanhua to Honggor to aid the recovery of the Shenzhou spacecraft, and to boost the local economy. This road shortened the journey between the two towns from two hours to just 40 minutes.

Chinese space program recovery teams (with SUV and recovery trucks) track the progress of re-entry near the landing site and arrive shortly after landing.

A small recovery trucks fitted with a crane lifts the capsule and places it on the rear of the truck for transportation back to the space centre.

Since the final landing of Shenzhou 11 in Dorbod Banner in 2016, new facilities have been built to hasten the retrieval process for various spacecraft.

In December 2020, the Chang'e 5 spacecraft landed in Dorbod Banner following a successful collection of Moon rocks.

== See also ==
- Chinese space program

== Notes ==
1. — All of the names presented here are transcribed from Chinese language sources using Hanyu Pinyin into the Roman alphabet. However, as these names are Mongolian and/or Manchu in origin, it would be much more accurate to transcribe them directly from those languages. These transcriptions are, however, unavailable as of now.
