= Evenk Ethnic Sum =

Evenk Ethnic Sum 鄂温克民族苏木
- Ethnic sum
- Location within Inner Mongolia
- Coordinates: 49°47′28″N 120°05′21″E
- Country: China
- Province-level division: Inner Mongolia
- Prefecture-level city: Hulunbuir
- Banner: Old Barag Banner

Area
  - Total: 6,037 km^{2} (2,331 sq mi)
- Elevation: 660 m (2,170 ft)

Population (2010)
  - Total: 2,665
  - Density: 0.4414/km^{2} (1.143/sq mi)
- Time zone: UTC+8 (China Standard)
- Postal code: 021512
- Area code: 0470

The Evenk Ethnic Sum (simplified Chinese: 鄂温克民族苏木; traditional Chinese: 鄂溫克民族蘇木; pinyin: Èwēnkè Mínzúsūmù) is an administrative subdivision in the northeastern part of Old Barag Banner in Hulunbuir, Inner Mongolia. It has an area of 6,037 km^{2} (2,331 sq mi) and, as of 2010, a population of 2665 of which 1560 (54.4%) are ethnic Evenks.

As of 2010, it is the only ethnic sum in China; the sum is a type of administrative unit in China at the township (fourth) level only found in Inner Mongolia, equivalent to ethnic townships in other parts of China.

It is located on grassland 68 kilometres (42 mi) north-northeast of the urban area of Hulunbuir.

== See also ==
- Evenks
- Sum (administrative division)
- Administrative divisions of the People's Republic of China
