= Wulanhua =

- Town
- Ulan Hua Town · ᠤᠯᠠᠭᠠᠨᠬᠤᠸᠠᠷ ᠪᠠᠯᠭᠠᠰᠤ · 乌兰花镇
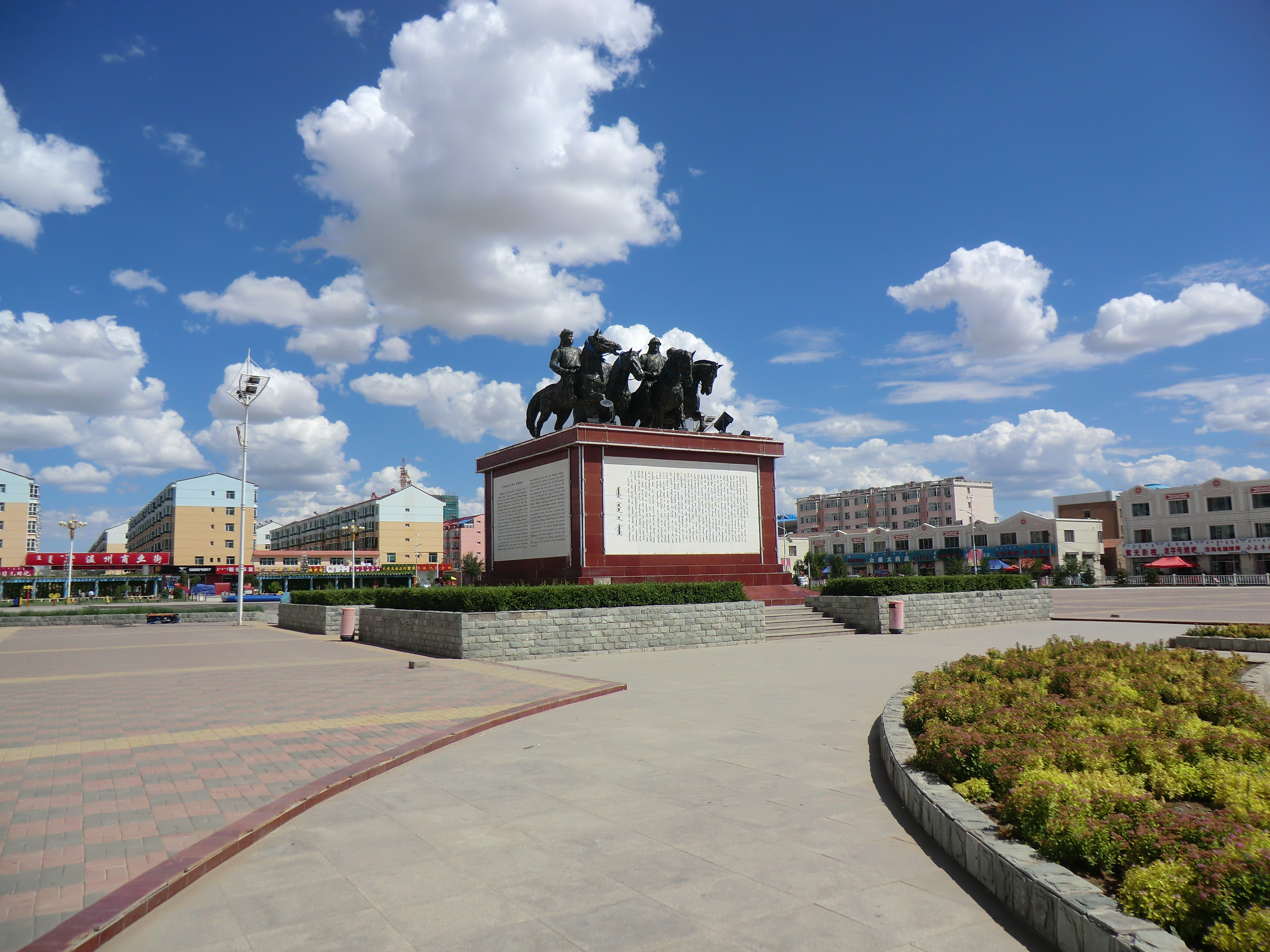
- Town square

- Location in Inner Mongolia
- Coordinates: 41.53°N 111.7°E
- Country: China
- Region: Inner Mongolia

Population (2000 Census)
  - Total: 36,645
- Time zone: UTC+8 (China Standard Time)

Wulanhua
- Chinese: 乌兰花
Transcriptions
Standard Mandarin
- Hanyu Pinyin: wūlánhuā

Ulan Hua or Wulanhua (ᠤᠯᠠᠭᠠᠨᠬᠤᠸᠠᠷ ᠪᠠᠯᠭᠠᠰᠤ Улан Хуа Chinese: 乌兰花; pinyin: Wūlán Huā) is the county seat of the Siziwang Banner (Dorbod Banner) in Inner Mongolia, China. The town is often incorrectly referred to as Siziwang, but Wulanhua is the correct name, Siziwang being the name of county it is in. It is the main transport hub for the region, and a necessary stop for independent travelling by public transport further north to the Gegentala area.

Wulanhua has a population of 36,645 according to the 5th census, carried out in the year 2000.
