= Old Barag Banner =

Old Barag Banner 陈巴尔虎旗 • ᠬᠠᠭᠤᠴᠢᠨ ᠪᠠᠷᠭᠤ ᠬᠣᠰᠢᠭᠤ
- Banner
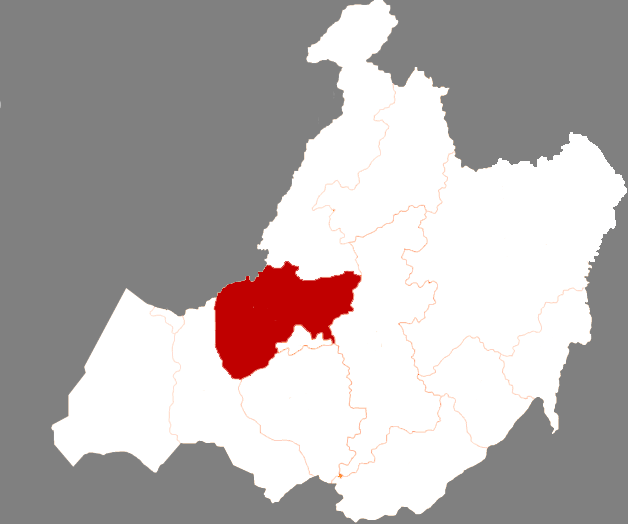
- Location of Old Barag Banner within Hulunbuir

- Location in Inner Mongolia Old Barag (China)
- Coordinates (Old Barag Banner government): 49°19′44″N 119°25′26″E
- Country: China
- Autonomous region: Inner Mongolia
- Prefecture-level city: Hulunbuir
- Banner seat: Bayan Hure

Area
  - Total: 17,457.63 km^{2} (6,740.43 sq mi)
- Elevation: 616 m (2,021 ft)

Population (2020)
  - Total: 50,556
  - Density: 2.8959/km^{2} (7.5004/sq mi)
- Time zone: UTC+8 (China Standard)
- Website: www.cbrhq.gov.cn

Old Barag Banner

Chinese name
- Simplified Chinese: 陈巴尔虎旗
- Traditional Chinese: 陳巴爾虎旗
Transcriptions
Standard Mandarin
- Hanyu Pinyin: Chén Bā'ěrhǔ Qí

Mongolian name
- Mongolian Cyrillic: Хуучин Барга хошуу
- Mongolian script: ᠬᠠᠭᠤᠴᠢᠨ ᠪᠠᠷᠭᠤ ᠬᠣᠰᠢᠭᠤ
Transcriptions
- SASM/GNC: Qaɣučin Barɣu qosiɣu

Old Barag Banner (Mongolian: ᠬᠠᠭᠤᠴᠢᠨ ᠪᠠᠷᠭᠤ ᠬᠣᠰᠢᠭᠤ; Chinese: 陈巴尔虎旗) is a banner of northeastern Inner Mongolia, China. It is located 28 kilometres (17 mi) from Hailar District, the administrative centre of Hulunbuir City, which administers this banner.

== History ==
The area was part of the Han dynasty, Tang dynasty, Liao Dynasty, and Yuan dynasty, and is still home to historical ruins from these eras.

The Old Barag Banner is named after the Barga Mongols, who inhabited the area prior its official organization.

The area of the present-day Old Barag Banner was organized by the Qing Dynasty in 1732.

The current iteration of the Old Barag Banner was organized in 1919, but has undergone numerous administrative and boundary changes since then.

== Economy ==
The banner is home to vast grasslands, which host a number of tourist attractions. The area is also home to various mineral deposits, which include coal, iron, copper, and zinc.

== Transportation ==
National Highway 301 and Inner Mongolia Provincial Highway 201 both pass through the banner. Additionally, the Binzhou Railway also passes through the banner.

== Administrative divisions ==
The Old Barag Banner has maintained jurisdiction over 3 towns, 3 sums, and 1 ethnic sum.

Name	Simplified Chinese	Hanyu Pinyin	Mongolian (Hudum Script)	Mongolian (Cyrillic)	Administrative division code
Towns
Bayan Hure Town	巴彦库仁镇	Bāyànkùrén Zhèn	ᠪᠠᠶᠠᠨᠬᠦᠷᠢᠶ᠎ᠡ ᠪᠠᠯᠭᠠᠰᠤ	Баянхүрээ балгас	150725100
Bor Xil Town	宝日希勒镇	Bǎorìxīlè Zhèn	ᠪᠣᠷᠣᠰᠢᠯᠢ ᠪᠠᠯᠭᠠᠰᠤ	Боршил балгас	150725101
Hoh Nur Town	呼和诺尔镇	Hūhénuò'ěr Zhèn	ᠬᠥᠬᠡᠨᠠᠭᠤᠷ ᠪᠠᠯᠭᠠᠰᠤ	Хөхнуур балгас	150725102
Sums
West Ujur Sum	西乌珠尔苏木	Xīwūzhū'ěr Sūmù	ᠪᠠᠷᠠᠭᠤᠨ ᠦᠵᠦᠭᠦᠷ ᠰᠤᠮᠤ	Баруун үзүүр сум	150725200
East Ujur Sum	东乌珠尔苏木	Dōngwūzhū'ěr Sūmù	ᠵᠡᠭᠦᠨ ᠦᠵᠦᠭᠦᠷ ᠰᠤᠮᠤ	Зүүн үзүүр сум	150725202
Bayan Had Sum	巴彦哈达苏木	Bāyànhādá Sūmù	ᠪᠠᠶᠠᠨᠬᠠᠳᠠ ᠰᠤᠮᠤ	Баянхад сум	150725203
Ethnic sum
Evenk Ethnic Sum	鄂温克民族苏木	Èwēnkè Mínzú Sūmù	ᠡᠸᠡᠩᠬᠢ ᠦᠨᠳᠦᠰᠦᠲᠡᠨ ᠦ ᠰᠤᠮᠤ	Эвэнк үндэстэний сум	150725201

- Others:
  - Hadat State-owned Ranch, Old Barag Banner (陈巴尔虎旗哈达图国营农牧场)
  - State-owned Hot Tohoi Ranch, Inner Mongolia (内蒙古自治区国有浩特陶海牧场)
  - Tenihe Ranch, Old Barag Banner (陈巴尔虎旗特泥河农牧场)

== Climate ==
Old Barag has a humid continental climate (Köppen Dwb).

Climate data for Old Barag Banner, elevation 597 m (1,959 ft), (1991–2020 normals, extremes 1981–2010)
Month	Jan	Feb	Mar	Apr	May	Jun	Jul	Aug	Sep	Oct	Nov	Dec	Year
Record high °C (°F)	0.0 (32.0)	4.6 (40.3)	17.2 (63.0)	29.4 (84.9)	35.2 (95.4)	39.9 (103.8)	40.6 (105.1)	37.5 (99.5)	33.6 (92.5)	27.3 (81.1)	12.1 (53.8)	1.5 (34.7)	40.6 (105.1)
Mean daily maximum °C (°F)	−19.8 (−3.6)	−13.3 (8.1)	−2.7 (27.1)	10.2 (50.4)	19.3 (66.7)	25.4 (77.7)	27.2 (81.0)	25.0 (77.0)	18.6 (65.5)	8.2 (46.8)	−5.8 (21.6)	−17.1 (1.2)	6.3 (43.3)
Daily mean °C (°F)	−26.0 (−14.8)	−20.9 (−5.6)	−9.9 (14.2)	3.2 (37.8)	12.1 (53.8)	18.6 (65.5)	21.1 (70.0)	18.7 (65.7)	11.3 (52.3)	1.2 (34.2)	−12.0 (10.4)	−22.7 (−8.9)	−0.4 (31.2)
Mean daily minimum °C (°F)	−30.8 (−23.4)	−26.9 (−16.4)	−16.5 (2.3)	−3.4 (25.9)	4.6 (40.3)	11.6 (52.9)	15.3 (59.5)	12.9 (55.2)	5.1 (41.2)	−4.3 (24.3)	−17.0 (1.4)	−27.4 (−17.3)	−6.4 (20.5)
Record low °C (°F)	−45.0 (−49.0)	−43.0 (−45.4)	−35.3 (−31.5)	−23.0 (−9.4)	−8.6 (16.5)	−1.3 (29.7)	4.6 (40.3)	1.3 (34.3)	−9.7 (14.5)	−21.8 (−7.2)	−39.7 (−39.5)	−42.9 (−45.2)	−45.0 (−49.0)
Average precipitation mm (inches)	4.1 (0.16)	3.4 (0.13)	5.4 (0.21)	10.6 (0.42)	21.2 (0.83)	48.8 (1.92)	92.3 (3.63)	74.3 (2.93)	33.7 (1.33)	13.5 (0.53)	6.6 (0.26)	6.1 (0.24)	320 (12.59)
Average precipitation days (≥ 0.1 mm)	9.1	6.5	5.2	5.6	7.7	11.5	13.8	12.5	9.2	6.5	7.7	10.1	105.4
Average snowy days	12.9	10.2	8.9	6.1	1.1	0.1	0	0	0.7	6.0	10.7	14.0	70.7
Average relative humidity (%)	73	72	65	50	46	57	67	69	64	62	71	75	64
Mean monthly sunshine hours	174.6	212.1	274.7	270.1	290.1	289.5	275.5	265.2	242.2	217.8	173.1	150.9	2,835.8
Percentage possible sunshine	64	73	74	65	61	60	57	60	65	66	64	60	64
Source: China Meteorological Administration
