= Honggor Sum, Siziwang Banner =

Honggor Sum 红格尔苏木
- Ethnic sum
- Location within Inner Mongolia
- Coordinates: 42°02′30″N 111°32′14″E
- Country: China
- Region: Inner Mongolia
- Prefecture-level city: Ulanqab
- Banner: Siziwang Banner
- Elevation: 1,267 m (4,157 ft)

Population (2000)
  - Total: 2,594
- Time zone: UTC+8 (China Standard)
- Postal code: 150929
- Area code: 0474

Honggor Sum (Mongolian: Хонгор, Mongolian: soft, or sweetheart; simplified Chinese: 红格尔苏木; traditional Chinese: 紅格爾蘇木; pinyin: Hónggé'ěr Sūmù) is a sum in the Siziwang Banner of Ulanqab, Inner Mongolia, China. In 2000, it had 2594 inhabitants. It is about 134 kilometres (83 mi) north-northwest of Hohhot, the capital of Inner Mongolia.
