= Sumu Wildlife Park =

National park in Nigeria

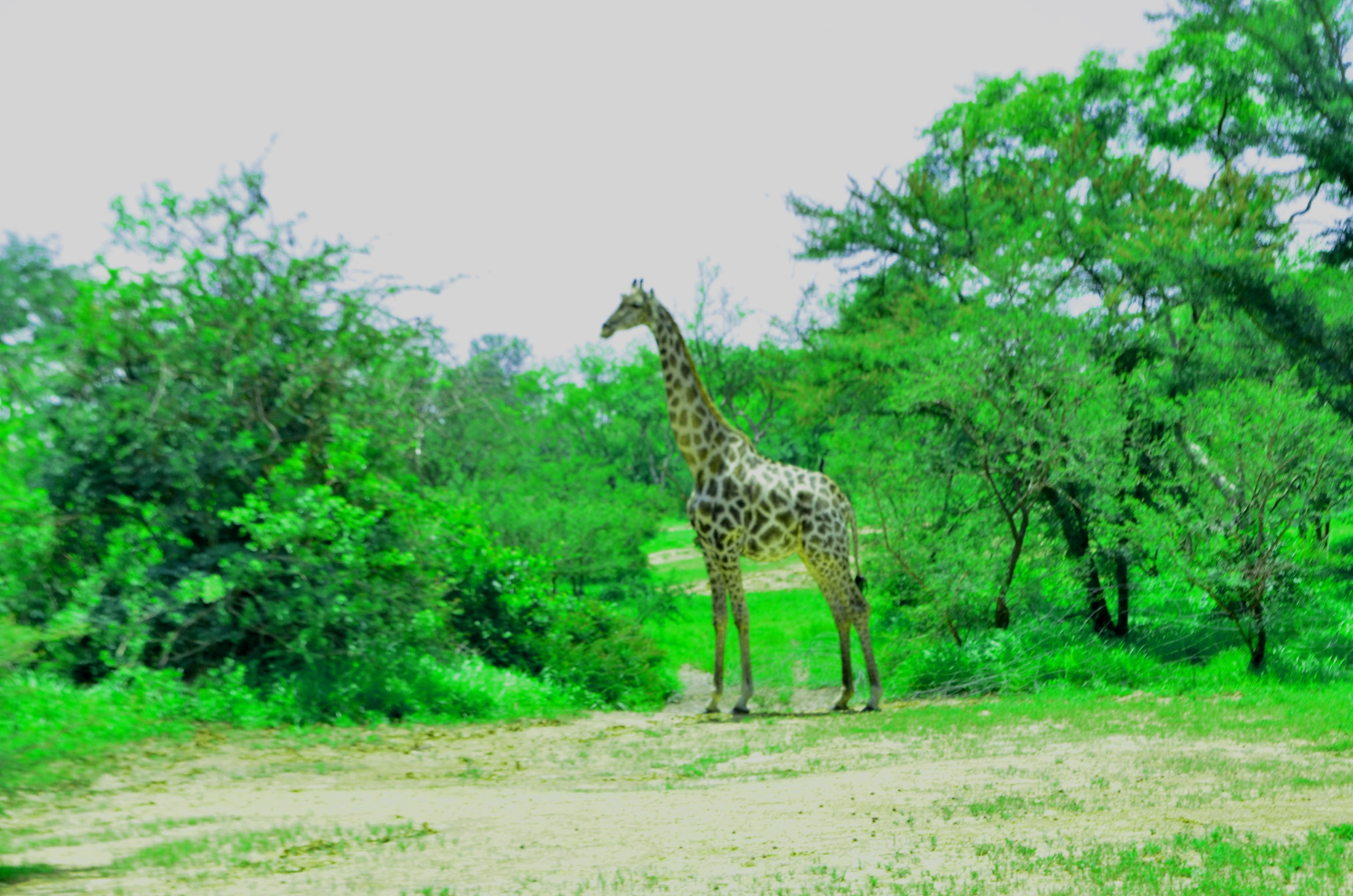
- A Giraffe in Sumu Wildlife Park

- Location within Nigeria
- Interactive map of Sumu Wildlife Park
- Location: Bauchi State, Nigeria
- Nearest city: Ganjuwa
- Coordinates: 9°50′48″N 10°18′30″E
- Governing body: National Park Service

Sumu Wildlife Park is a small game reserve located in the Sumu forest, Ganjuwa Local Government Area, Bauchi State, Nigeria. It was opened for operation in 2006. The Sumu forest reserve is located to the north from Bauchi. It is one of the three wildlife parks in Bauchi

== Donations ==
After opening the park, Namibian government donated a total number of 279 wildlife species to the Bauchi State Government comprising 10 Giraffes, 53 Burchell’s Zebras, 14 Elands, 23 blue Wildebeests, 21 red Hartebeests, 24 Oryxs, 26 Kudus, 52 Springboks and 56 common Impalas. The animals were gotten from different game reserves in Namibia. They made sure that Sumu was safe for them, it is a fenced and game friendly forest reserve so it’s very suitable for the animals. Game guards and rangers watch over the animals.

== Environment and Climate ==
The Sumu widelife park is set up to help protect the environment from the effect of climate change. Apart being a tourist attraction, the Park also have the goal of protecting the environment, conserve fauna and flora through the planting of trees in the Wild Life Park.

== Gallery ==
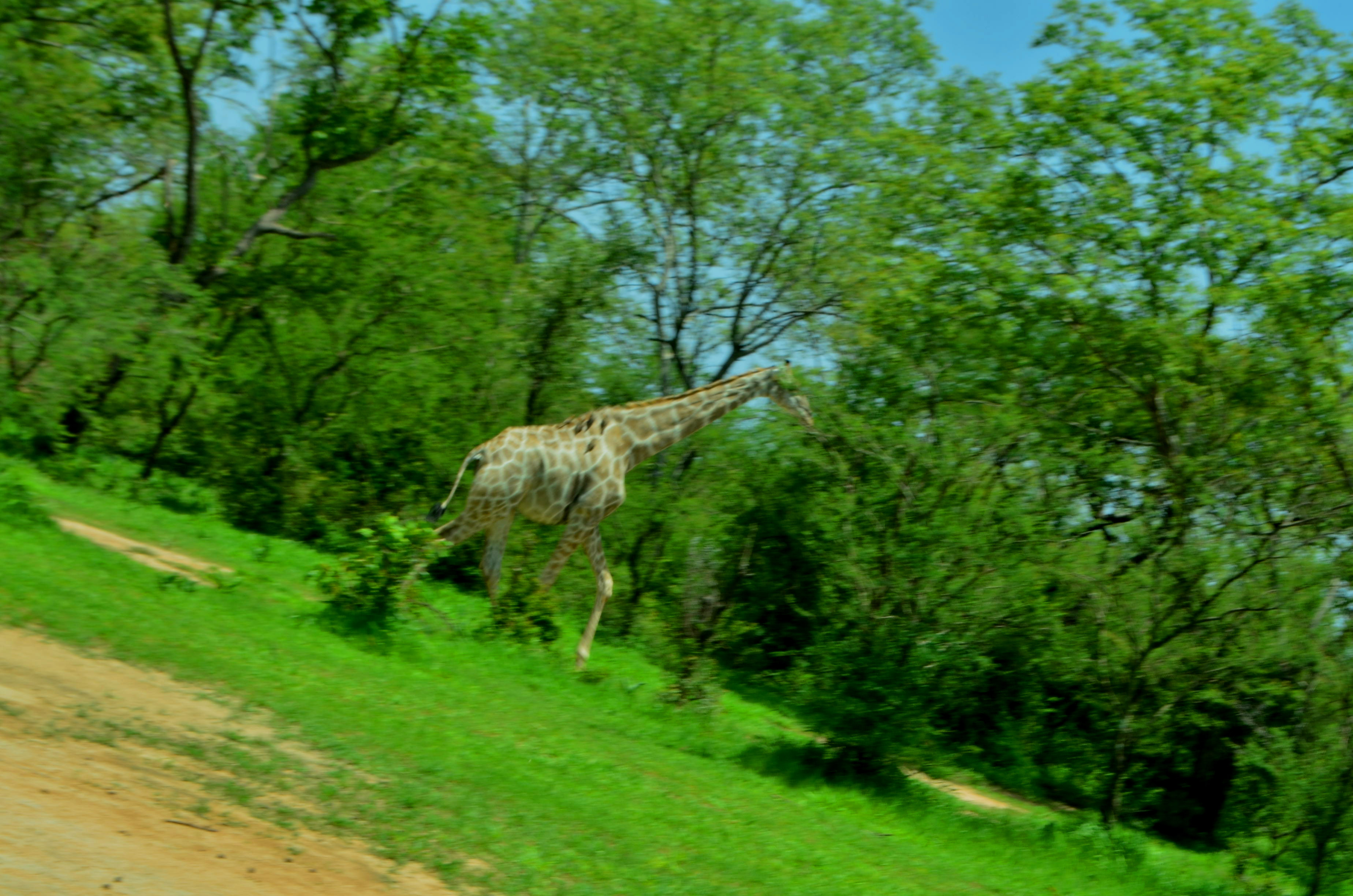
A Giraffe in Sumu Wildlife Park

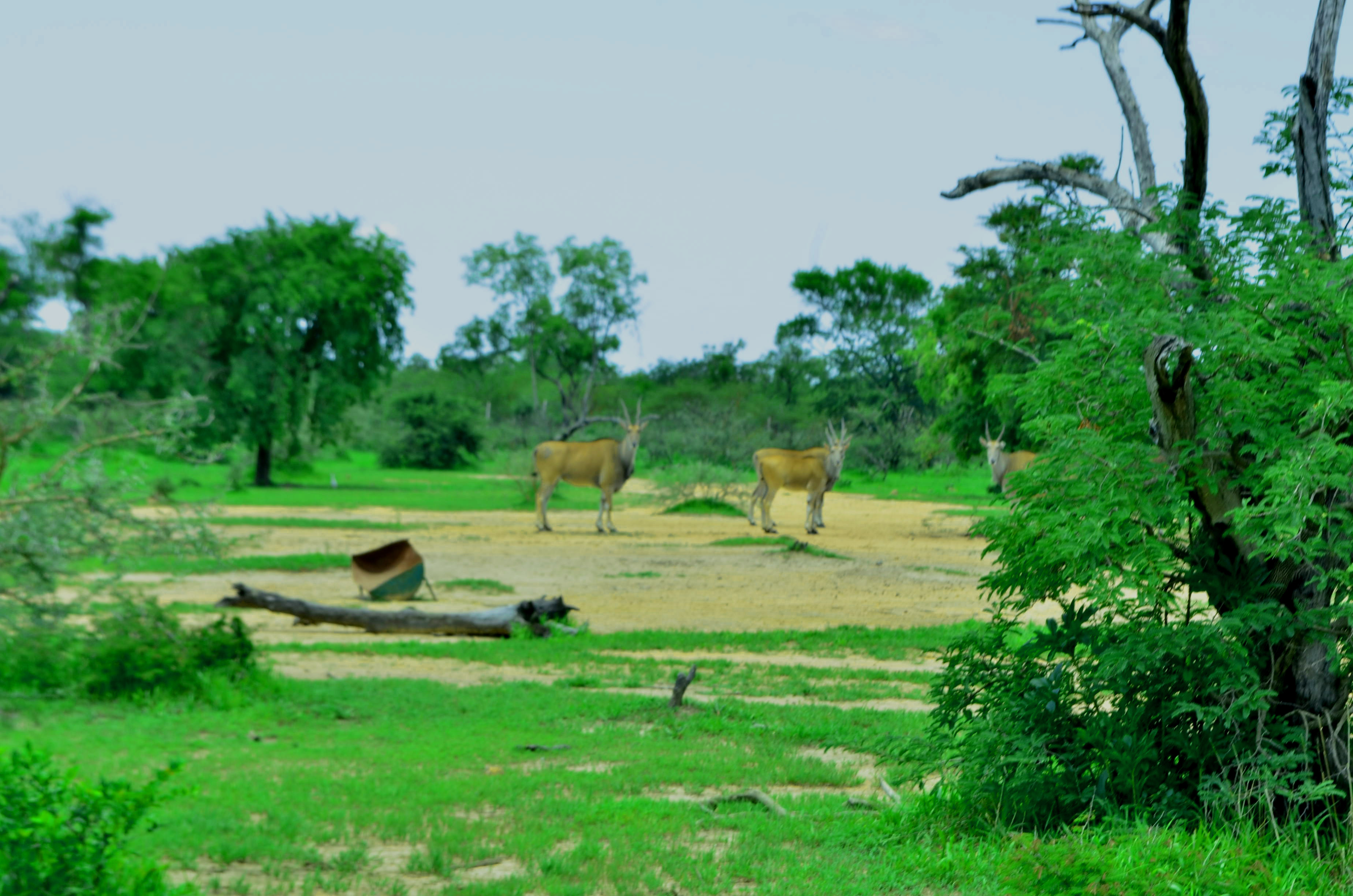
Some red Hartebeests in Sumu Wildlife Park

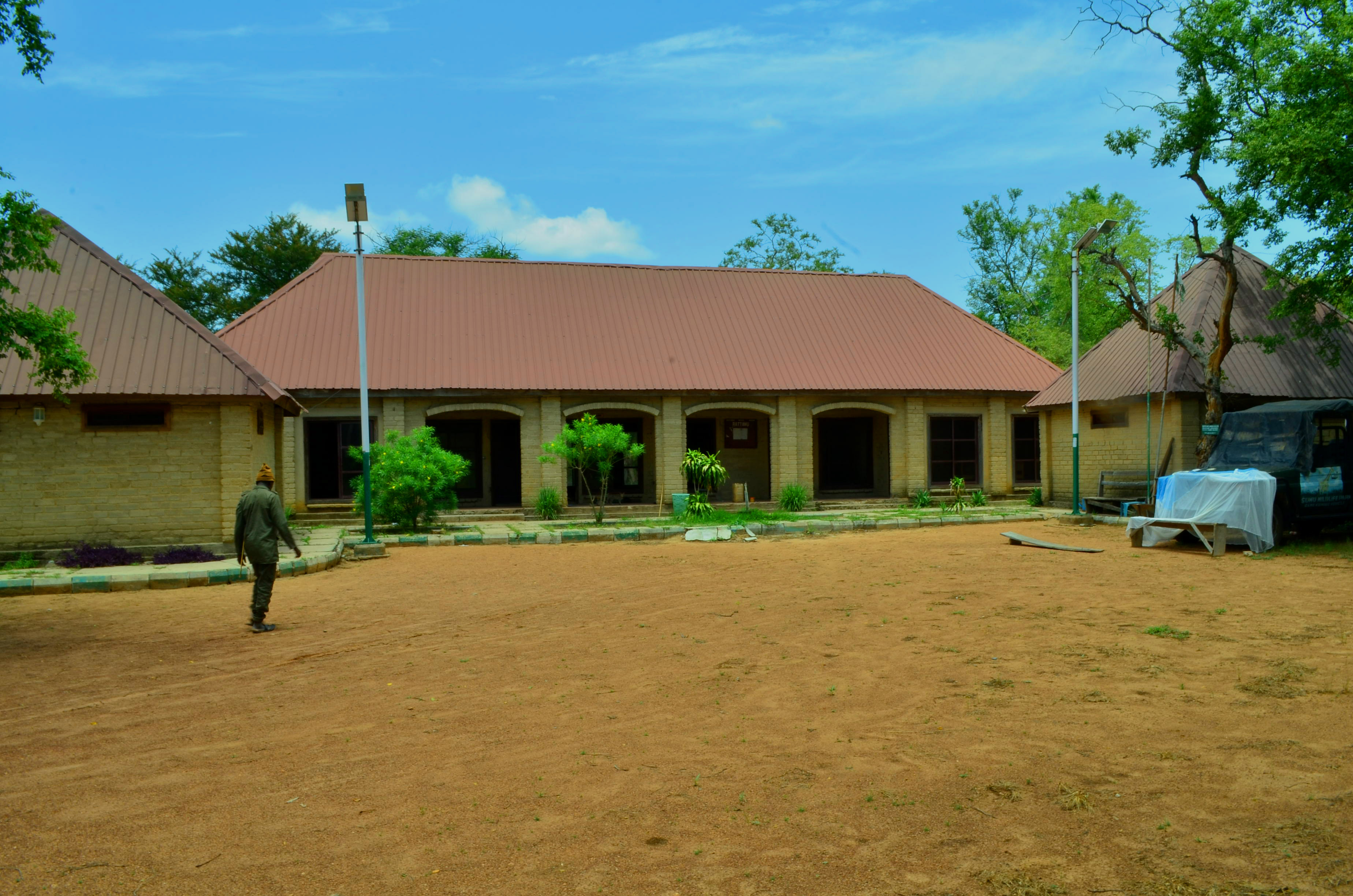
Sumu Wildlife Park Ranger walking towards the visitor's reception building

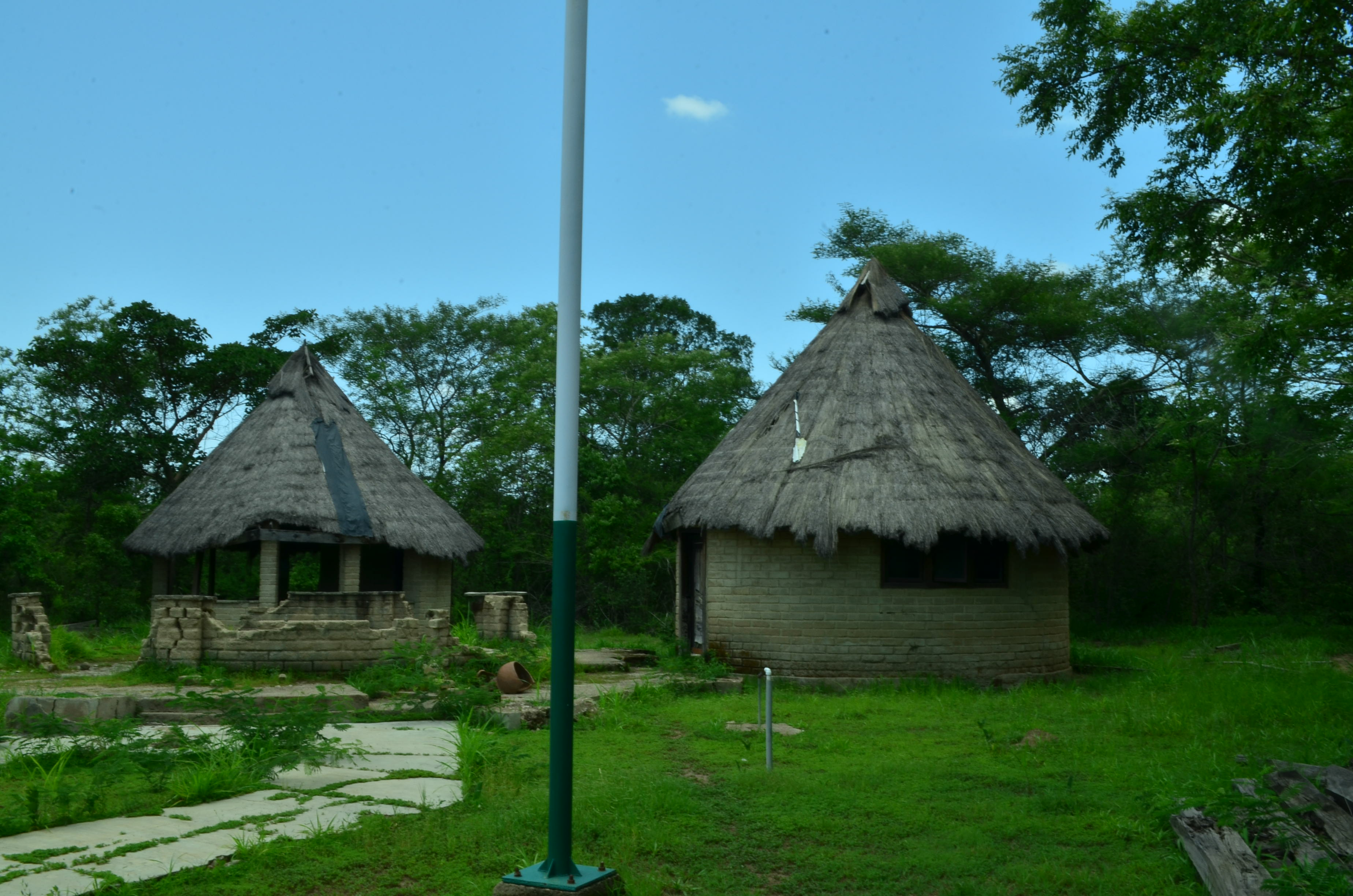
Huts in Sumu Wildlife Park

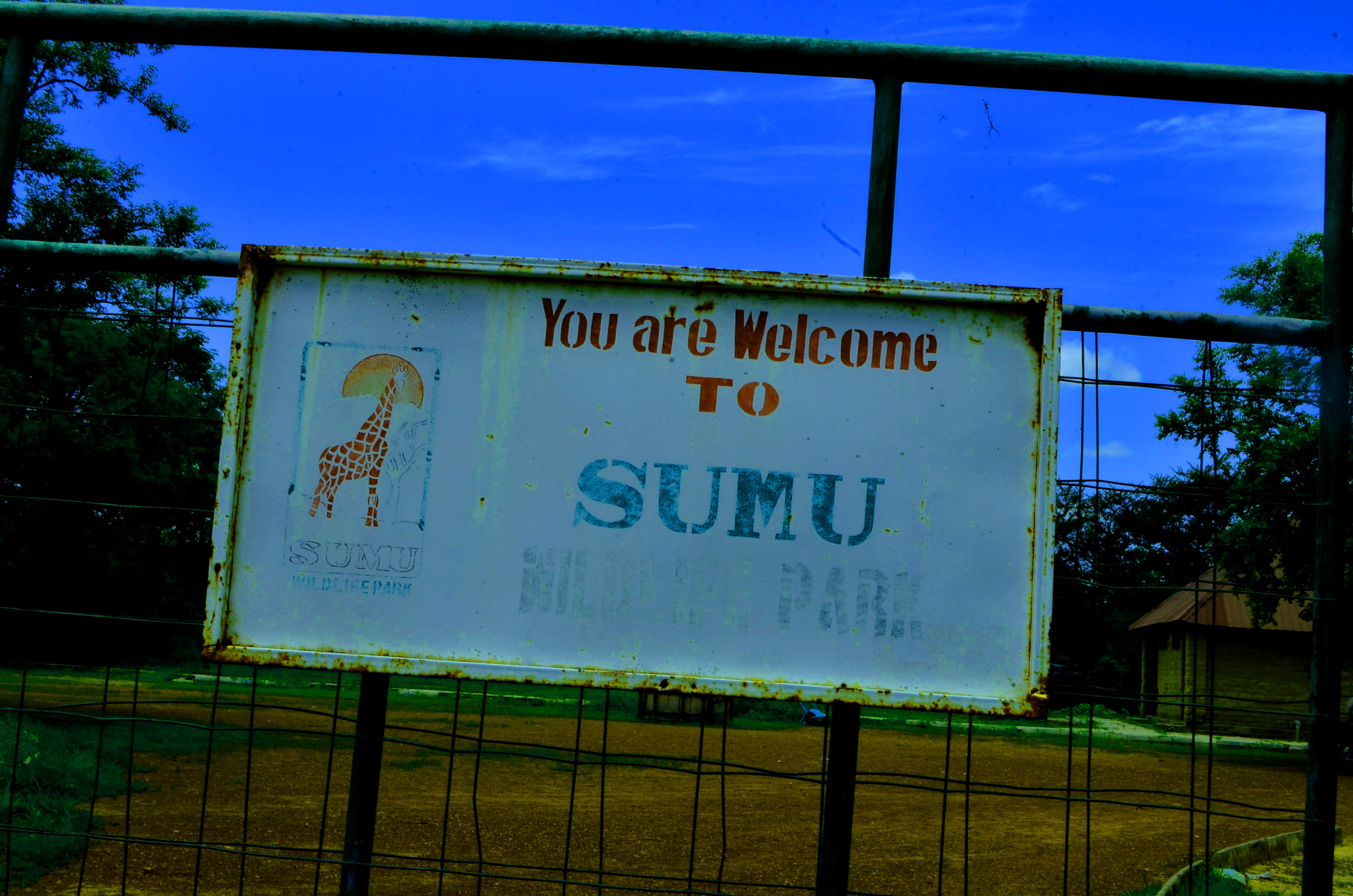
Sumu Wildlife Park Entrance Sign
