= Salt pond =

Salt pond or Saltpond may refer to:

== Types of salt ponds ==
- Salt evaporation pond, an artificial salt pond
- Tropical salt pond ecosystem, a natural salt pond ecosystem
- Salt pan (geology), desert feature with occasional salt ponds
- Small salt lake, a saline pond

== Places ==
- Salt Pond Cay, Bahamas; see List of islands of the Bahamas
- Salt Pond Power Station, Burin Bay Arm, Newfoundland Island, Newfoundland and Labrador, Canada; see List of generating stations in Newfoundland and Labrador
- Saltpond, Central Region, South Ghana, Ghana, West Africa; a town
  - Saltpond Girls' Secondary School
- Saltpond Oil Field, Central Region, South Ghana, Ghana; an offshore field just off the coast in the Gulf of Guinea
- Salt Pond, Chacachacare, Chaguaramas, Trinidad and Tobago; a pond
- Salt Pond Beach, Salt Pond Beach Park, Port Allen, West Shore, Kauai, Hawaii, USA; see List of beaches in Hawaii
- Salt Pond Township, Saline County, Missouri, USA
- Salt Pond, Narragansett, Rhode Island, USA; a village
- Salt Pond Mountain, Giles County, Virginia, USA; a mountain
- Salt Pond Bay, Virgin Islands National Park, Saint John, U.S. Virgin Islands; a bay on Saint John Island

== Other uses ==
- Salt Pond (Korean: 수전지대, romanized: Sujeonjidae), a 1968 South Korean film directed by Kim Soo-yong, and starring Nam Jeong-im, Lee Soon-jae, Do Kum-bong

== See also ==
- Great Salt Pond (disambiguation)
- Salt Lake (disambiguation)
- Salt (disambiguation)
- Pond (disambiguation)
