= Salt Lake =

A salt lake is a lake containing a high concentration of salt.

Salt Lake may also refer to:

== Places ==
=== Landforms ===
- Salt pan (geology), desert feature, a dry lake that may become a salty lake in wet weather

=== Lakes ===
- North America:
  - Salt Lake (Arkansas), in Clark County
  - Salt Lake (Brown County, South Dakota)
  - Salt Lake (Minnesota–South Dakota), (U.S.) bi-state lake, in counties of Lac qui Parle (MN) and Deuel (SD)
  - Salt Lake (Campbell County, South Dakota)
  - Salt Lake (Florida), a lake in Pinellas County, Florida, United States
  - Little Salt Lake, small salt lake in Utah
  - Great Salt Lake, the largest salt lake in the Western Hemisphere, located in northern Utah, U.S.
  - Great Salt Lake Desert, a large playa in northern Utah
  - Zuñi Salt Lake, a rare, high desert lake (a classic maar) south of the Zuni Pueblo, New Mexico
  - Salt Lake (Saskatchewan), a lake in Saskatchewan, Canada
- Oceania:
  - Salt Lake (New Zealand), in the Northland Region
- Europe:
  - Salt Lake (Poland), a lake in Pomeranian Voivodeship
  - Larnaca Salt Lake, Cyprus
- Asia:
  - Lake Tuz, whose Turkish name 'Tuz Gölü' means 'salt lake', found in central Anatolia, Turkey
  - Dead Sea, west of Jordan, east of Israel, east of Palestinian Authorities
  - Sambhar Salt Lake, India’s largest salt lake, west of Jaipur

=== Facilities and structures ===
- Salt Lake City International Airport, an airport in Utah
- Salt Lake Stadium, the world's second largest stadium, formally named Yuva Bharati Krirangan, located in Kolkata, India
- Salt Lake Temple, a temple of The Church of Jesus Christ of Latter-day Saints

=== Jurisdictions ===
- India
  - Salt Lake City, Kolkata, popular nickname for Bidhannagar, Kolkata, India
- United States
  - Salt Lake, Hawaii, neighborhood on the island of Oahu
  - In Utah:
    - Salt Lake City, capital of Utah and county seat of Salt Lake County
    - Salt Lake County, Utah
    - Salt Lake Valley
    - North Salt Lake, Utah
    - South Salt Lake, Utah

== Salt Lake City sport teams ==
- Real Salt Lake, in Major League Soccer
- Salt Lake Bees, in minor league baseball

== Other uses ==
- USS Salt Lake City, two United States Navy vessels

== See also ==
- Salt Lake City (disambiguation)
- Great Salt Lake (disambiguation)
- Dabasun Nor (disambiguation), Mongolian for 'Salt Lake'
- Salt River (disambiguation)
- Saltpond (disambiguation) including 'Salt Pond'
- Salt (disambiguation)
- Lake (disambiguation)
