= Naparima =

Naparima may refer to:

- Naparima Plain, the peneplain which occupies part of western south Trinidad
- Naparima (ward), one of the wards in County Victoria
- Naparima (parliamentary constituency), a seat in the Parliament of Trinidad and Tobago, east of San Fernando
- Naparima Hill, the proper name for San Fernando Hill
- Naparima College, an all-male secondary school in San Fernando
- Naparima Girls' High School, an all-female secondary school in San Fernando
- Naparima College, Tunapuna, the original name of Hillview College
- Naparima College, Siparia, the original name of Iere High School
