= Dabasun Nor =

Dabasun Nor, Noor, &c. (Mongolian for "Salt Lake") may refer to

- Dabusun Lake, a salt lake in Haixi Prefecture, Qinghai, China
- Dabasun Nor, Inner Mongolia, a former lake in northern China

== See also ==
- Salt Lake (disambiguation)
