= Kirton Huggins =

Trinidad and Tobago Coast Guard officer

Kirton Huggins, ED, psc
- Captain Kirton Huggins
- Military career
- Allegiance: Trinidad and Tobago
- Branch: Trinidad and Tobago Coast Guard
- Service years: 1981—present
- Rank: Captain, Trinidad and Tobago Coast Guard
- Awards: Meritorious Service Medal (4 awards); Coast Guard Commendation Medal (4 awards)

Captain Kirton Huggins, ED, psc is director of the Strategic Project Management Office.

Huggins is a former Commanding Officer of the Trinidad and Tobago Coast Guard (COTTCG). Prior to that he was Executive Officer of the Trinidad and Tobago Coast Guard (XOTTCG), assuming the position from XOTTCG J Ramoutar on June 14, 2005. Huggins was once assigned as the Procurement Officer of the Coast Guard.

== Coast Guard career ==
After attending basic training at Staubles Bay in Chaguaramas in 1978, his first duty station was to a patrol boat.

== Academic degrees ==
Commander Huggins' educational accomplishments include a Bachelor of Science Degree magna cum laude from University of the West Indies.

== Personal ==
Commander Huggins is married and has three children. He has been installed as Vice President, Lions Club of Port of Spain Central for the fiscal year 2009/2010.

Military offices
Preceded by J Ramoutar	Executive Officer of the Trinidad and Tobago Coast Guard; 2005–present	Incumbent

== Sources ==
This article incorporates text in the public domain from various sites.

- "Trinidad & Tobago - $M drug bust at sea" (PDF). Trinidad Newday.
- "Multinational exercise prepares nations for natural, man-made disasters" (PDF). U.S. Army South Public Affairs. Archived from the original (PDF) on December 20, 2005.
- "TT COAST GUARD COMMISSIONING CEREMONY". Airguns Trinidad and Tobago.
- "PoS Central Lions install new leaders". Trinidad Newday.
