= Kweku Budu-Acquah =

Ghanaian diplomat (born 1932)

Ghana Ambassador to Somalia
- In office 1961–1962
- Appointed by: Kwame Nkrumah
- Preceded by: New
- Succeeded by: Embassy closed

Ghana's Resident Minister to Guinea
- In office 1962–1964
- Appointed by: Kwame Nkrumah
- Preceded by: Stephen Allen Dzirasa
- Succeeded by: D. K. Kulevome

Personal details
- Born: 3 June 1932 Akobima near Saltpond, Gold Coast
- Party: Convention People's Party
- Education: Adisadel College
- Alma mater: Hull University; London School of Economics
- Occupation: Diplomat

Kweku Budu-Acquah (born 3 June 1932) was a Ghanaian politician and diplomat. He served as Ghana's first ambassador to Somalia and Ghana's resident Minister in Guinea from 1962 to 1964. He served as Ambassador Extra Ordinary and Minister Plenipontentary from 1964 until 1966 when the Nkrumah government was overthrown.

== Early life and education ==
Budu-Acquah was born on 3 June 1932 at Akobima, a town near Saltpond. He had his early education at the Bekwai Methodist in the Ashanti Region, and his secondary education at Adisadel College, Cape Coast. He then proceeded to the United Kingdom where he studied Sociology, Political Science and Anthropology at Hull University, and Development of Sociological Theory under Professor Ginsberg at the London School of Economics and Political Science. He also studied International Relations under Professor Manning for a year at the London School of Economic and Political Science.

== Career and politics ==
Prior to moving to the United Kingdom for further studies, Budu-Acquah worked as an editor at the Ashanti Sentinel, the Accra Evening News and the African Spokesman. As a member of the Convention People's Party, he served as the party's propaganda secretary as well.

Following his return to the Gold Coast, Budu-Acquah joined the Kwame Nkrumah Ideological Institute as a teaching staff. There, he taught Economics and Political Science, and later worked with the Ghana Foreign Service. In 1961, he was appointed Ghana's first ambassador to Somalia, where he also oversaw other colonies in Eastern Africa until they gained their independence. These countries were; Kenya, Uganda and Tanzania. Over the years, the relationship between Ghana and Somalia grew weak, and in 1962, the Somalian government asked that the Ghanaian ambassador to Somalia be recalled back to Ghana. Budu-Acquah was then moved to Guinea as Ghana's resident Minister in Guinea, succeeding Stephen Allen Dzirasa who had been moved to the Ministry of Foreign Affairs as the second in command (Deputy Minister). After two years serving in Guinea, Budu-Acquah was returned to the Ministry of Foreign Affairs as the Ambassador Extra Ordinary and Minister Plenipontentary. He was succeeded by D. K. Kulevome.
