= Great Salt Pond (disambiguation) =

Great Salt Pond may refer to:

- Great Salt Pond, a lake in Saint Kitts and Nevis, in the Caribbean
- Great Salt Pond, Sint Maarten, in the Caribbean
- Great Salt Pond Archeological District, Rhode Island, USA

== See also ==
- Great Salt Lake (disambiguation)
- Salt pond (disambiguation)
