= Mr. Louie =

Oil drilling platform

Coordinates: 5.093°N 1.069°W

Mr. Louie is a former self-elevating drilling barge (jackup rig) converted into an oil platform. It was the first self-elevating drilling barge classed by the American Bureau of Shipping. As an oil platform, it operates at the Saltpond Oil Field, offshore Ghana.

== Description ==
Mr. Louie weighs 6200 tons. Its minimal operational water depth is 40 metres (130 ft). It has five tugs which pulled her around, and twelve legs for standing on the seabed. It has rings welded onto its cylindrical legs to provide a positive jack connection. Its footing equivalent diameter is 6.7 metres (22 ft), and approximate footing load is 10 meganewtons (2,200,000 lb_{f}).

== History ==
Mr Louie was designed by Emile Brinkmann between 1956 and 1958. The drilling barge was built by Universal Drilling Co. It was launched in 1958 and delivered in 1959. In 1958, Mr. Louie became the first self-elevating drilling barge classed by the American Bureau of Shipping.

In 1959, it was leased to Reading & Bates (now part of Transocean). The rig was valued by the leasing contract at US$4.75 million. This transaction was later challenged by the United States tax authorities as a sale agreement. In 1965, the barge was sold pursuant to contractual option to Reading & Bates.

Mr. Louie first drilled at the Gulf of Mexico, where it drilled more than 40 wells. Later it was transferred to the North Sea. In 1963, while drilling on the German Bight, a pocket of very high pressure carbon dioxide struck the well, causing a blowout. The blowout created a 400-metre (1,300 ft) wide and 31-metre (102 ft) deep crater called Figge-Maar.

In May 1964, Mr. Louie drilled the first offshore hole in the North Sea, 30 miles (48 km) off of Juist island. In June, it made the first North Sea gas discovery. Later it was used for natural gas exploration in the UK section of the North Sea. In 1967, Mr. Louie was a part of the unique action for that time when for the first time in the North Sea, it went to dock for reparations and maintenance and was replaced by another rig (Orion) during the drilling. After the structural repairs and maintenance work at Bremerhaven, Mr. Louie continued drilling at the North Sea for the Gas Council – Amoco group.

After the North Sea, Mr. Louie was moved to West Africa. In 1969, it passed through Gibraltar. Temporary moorings were needed and their setting into the rocky floor of Gibraltar Bay required the use of the Edwardian air lock diving-bell plant to work at depth. Between 1977 and 1978 it drilled six appraisal wells at the Saltpond Oil Field in offshore Ghana. After completing the drilling in 1978, Mr. Louie was converted into an oil platform at this field. It was officially renamed APG-1.

== See also ==
- Sea Gem
- Sea Quest
