= Kwamena Bentsi-Enchill =

Supreme Court Judge

Supreme Court Judge
- In office 1971–1972
- Appointed by: Kofi Abrefa Busia

Personal details
- Born: Kwamena Bentsi-Enchill; 22 September 1919 Saltpond
- Died: October 21, 1974 (aged 55)
- Education: Achimota College; Oxford University; Harvard University; Chicago University
- Profession: Judge

Kwamena Bentsi-Enchill (1919-1974) was a Ghanaian judge and academic. He was a justice of the Supreme Court of Ghana from 1971 to 1972. He was also a professor of law at the University of Zambia and the University of Ghana. He was a fellow of the Ghana Academy of Arts and Sciences.

== Early life ==
Bentsi-Enchill was born on 22 September 1919 to Kofi Bentsi-Enchill, an agent of the United African Company, and Madam Christiana Obu at Saltpond in the Central Region of Ghana. He studied at Achimota College from 1927 to 1941. After leaving Achimota College he joined the Mfantsipim School teaching staff and taught there until 1943 when he left for the United Kingdom to study at Oriel College, Oxford University, there, he read Philosophy, Politics, and Economics. Upon graduating in 1947, he returned to the Gold Coast for a brief while before going to London to read law at the Middle Temple. In 1950, he was called to the Bar and subsequently returned to the Gold Coast to serve under Edward Akufo-Addo's pupillage in Kwakwaduam Chambers, Accra. After serving his pupillage he established his own Chambers in Accra, Naoferg Chambers.

== Politics ==
Bentsi-Enchill ventured politics in the early 1950s and joined the Convention People's Party. He later resigned from the party to stand for the Saltpond seat as an independent candidate in 1954.

== Ghana Bar and International Commission of Jurists ==
After the leaving politics, he decided to focus more on the advancement of law in the country. He subsequently joined the Ghana Bar Association and served as its secretary from 1958 to 1960. Within that period he was made an Honorary Secretary of Freedom and Justice, the Ghana Section of the International Commission of Jurists, he served as its Vice-President from 1958 to 1960. In 1959, he was appointed by the International Commission of Jurists, acommittee that was responsible for the investigation of charges of genocide against the Chinese after they occupied Tibet.

== Academia, judiciary and public appointments ==
Bentsi-Enchill abandoned a lucrative legal practice to join the teaching staff of the Ghana School of Law that had been established in 1958. In 1961, he joined the University of Ghana law faculty as a senior lecturer in law but left that same year for the United States to pursue his LL.M. degree at Harvard University and his doctorate in juridical science at the Chicago University. He became an associate professor at the Northwestern University teaching political science prior to leaving the US to found the then newly established University of Zambia's law faculty in 1966. He served as professor and dean of the faculty from 1966 to 1970. While at the University of Zambia, he was the founder and first editor of the Zambia Law Journal. He also founded the Juristic Studies Association of Zambia in 1968 under the patronage of the then President of Zambia, Kenneth Kaunda. He also pressed for the establishment of the Council of Law Reporting in Zambia which was to be mandated to report decisions of the higher courts of judicature of Zambia and urged the Zambian Ministry of Legal Affairs to prepare an estimate of the country's need for qualified lawyers for the decade 1969 to 1978. He established the Law Practice Institute of Zambia which was to give practical training to lawyers, and served as its first director. On 16 April 1970 he was elected fellow of the Ghana Academy of Arts and Sciences. The following year, he was appointed justice of the Supreme Court of Ghana, he served in that capacity until 1972 when the Supreme Court was abolished by the military junta that ousted the Busia government. In the National Redemption Council government (which was in power from 1972 until 1975 when it evolved into the Supreme Military Council), he was the a member of the executive council of the Ghana Academy of Arts and Sciences, the Commissioner for Stool Lands and Boundaries Settlement, and the Chairman of the Volta River Authority until his untimely death in 1974.

== Publications ==
Bentsi-Enchill wrote numerous articles in law journals in Ghana and abroad. In 1964, he authored Land Law in Ghana which was published by Sweet and Maxwell, London. At the time of his death, he was working on a book that focused on the problems of Legal integration.

== Death and tribute ==
Bentsi-Enchill died on Monday 21 October 1974 at the age of 55 at the 37 Military Hospital, Accra. This was as a result of injuries he had sustained in a motor accident he was involved in on his return from Aburi to Accra on the evening of 14 October 1974. The car run into a heap of sand on the Aburi-Accra road and somersaulted. He left behind his wife and five children.

The then head of state and chairman of the National Redemption Council, Ignatius Kutu Acheampong said he had received the news of his death in great shock. He paid him tribute saying;

"by his death, Ghana has lost an eminent scholar and citizen who brought great distinction on himself and his country and who gave good counsel and dedicated service to his nation on many assignments including the; chairmanship of the Stool Lands Boundary Commission and the Volta River Authority.

== See also ==
- List of judges of the Supreme Court of Ghana
- Supreme Court of Ghana
