= Gibdock =

Dockyard in Gibraltar

Coordinates: 36.126412°N 5.353567°W

- Company type: Private company
- Industry: Shipbuilding; Marine engineering
- Genre: Shipyard services
- Predecessor: Cammell Laird
- Founded: Main Wharf Road, Gibraltar Dockyard, Gibraltar (1904)
- Founder: Royal Navy
- Headquarters: Main Wharf Road, Gibraltar Dockyard, Gibraltar
- Area served: Gibraltar
- Key people: Simon Gillett (Chief Executive Officer); John Furmston (Chief Operating Officer); Richard Beards (Managing Director); John Taylor (Operations Director)
- Services: Ship repair
- Website: Gibdock.com

Gibdock is a shipyard in the British overseas territory of Gibraltar. It formerly operated as a Royal Navy Dockyard.

== Royal Navy Dockyard ==
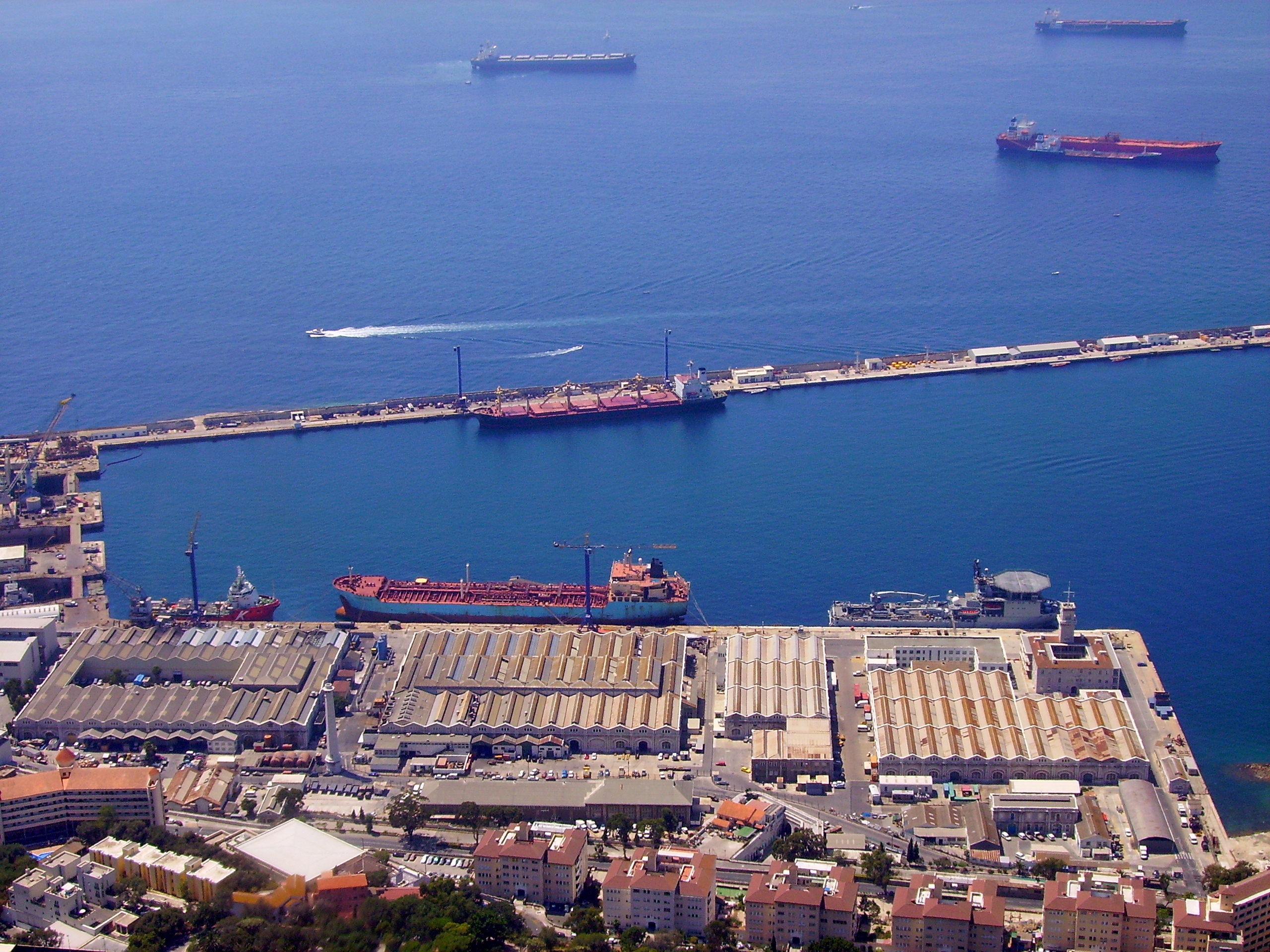
Dockyard buildings, including separate workshops for timber and metal works (either side of the chimney), electrical workshop, naval storehouse and the dockyard offices (far right, with tower)

HM Dockyard, Gibraltar was first developed in the 18th century. After the Capture of Gibraltar, victualling facilities were provided from a small quay around what is now the North Mole, but a lack of berths prevented further development. In the 1720s, however, the building of the South Mole was accompanied by the establishment of a small dockyard facility consisting of a careening wharf, mast house, and various workshops. The yard remained relatively small in scale for a century and a half, although coaling facilities were added in the 1840s.

In 1871, Captain Augustus Phillimore made the proposal that a new naval dockyard should be constructed in Gibraltar. Phillimore's scheme lay dormant in the Admiralty for 22 years before it was put to Parliament in 1895. The idea was to take five years and just under £1.5m pounds. In 1896, the scheme was further extended with the creation of new moles and three dry docks and a new budget of £4.5m pounds. The transformation was large and the government were still passing enabling legislation in 1905.

To take pressure off the harbour facilities the British Admiralty, decided to lay in heavy moorings off the harbour for its battleships, and to facilitate that, they imported from Britain an air lock diving-bell plant, a purpose-built barge in 1902. Local conditions at Gibraltar dictated the need for such a craft. Most harbours have a soft seabed, and it is usual to lay down moorings by settling anchors in the mud, clay or sand but this could not be done in Gibraltar harbour, where the seabed is hard rock, requiring permanent moorings in place.

=== The dry docks ===
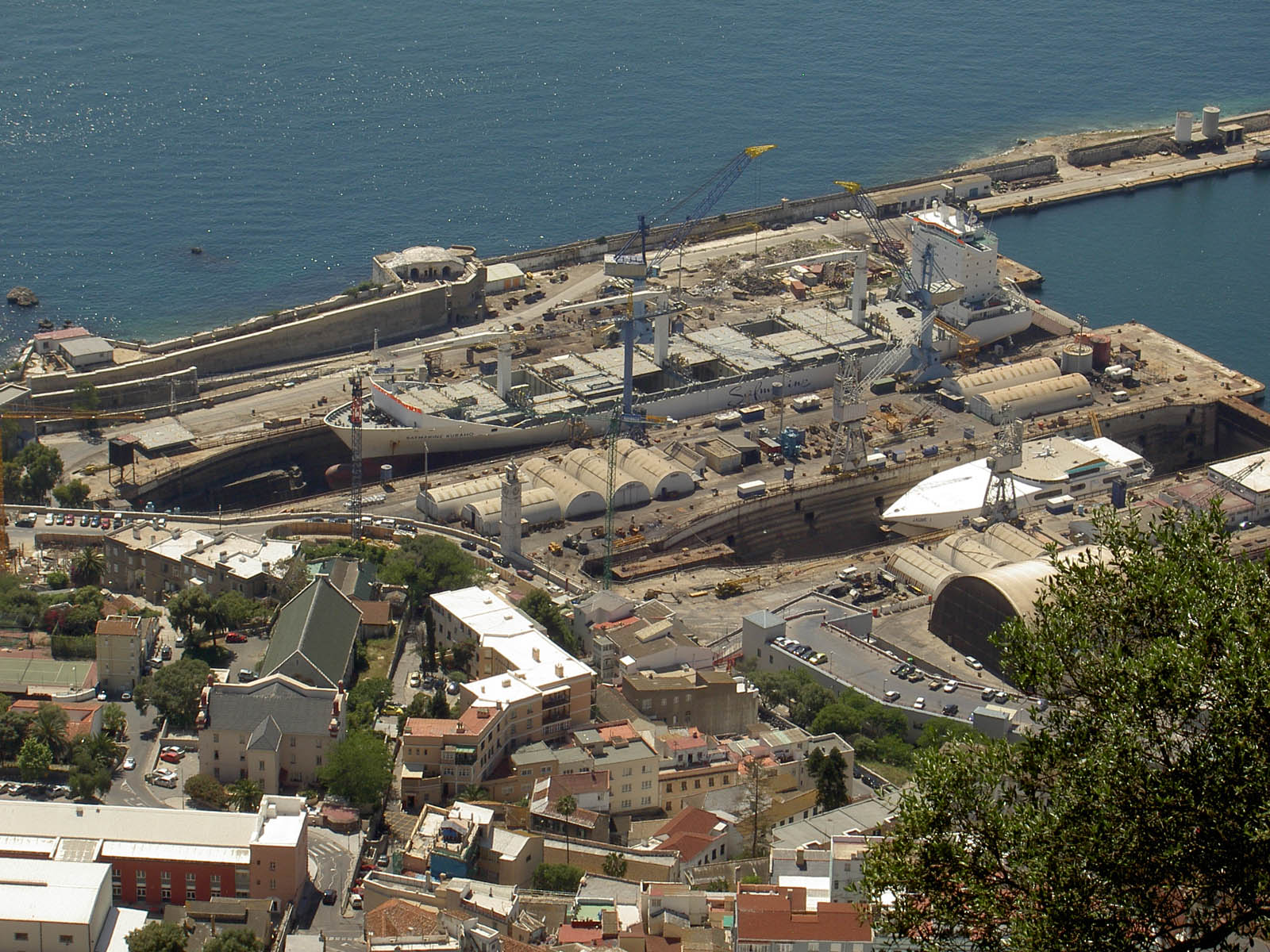
Dry docks at Gibdock as seen from the Rock of Gibraltar.

The three large graving docks initially known as docks Number 1, 2 and 3, were excavated on what had been the site of the old naval yard. Number 3 dock, the smallest at just over 50,000 tons of water capacity, was the first to be named in 1903 and was named King Edward VII; Queen Alexandra named the 60,000 ton Number 2 dock after herself in 1906; and the largest, Number 1 dock, which could hold over 100,000 tons of water, was called the Prince and Princess of Wales (later King George V and Queen Mary) dock, having been named by them in 1907.

In 1937 the warning of the Chiefs of Staff gave way to rearmament. The danger of a war being settled in the Mediterranean meant that No. 1 and No. 2 dock were extended so that Gibraltar could handle aircraft carriers and the new larger battleships.

== Civilian ownership ==
The dockyard was used extensively by the Royal Navy, docking many of the Navy’s most prestigious ships. In the early 1980s, a decision by the United Kingdom's Ministry of Defence to cut back the Royal Navy surface fleet meant that the dockyard was no longer financially viable.

In 1984, the dockyard passed into the hands of the UK ship repair and conversion company, A&P Group. A government grant and a prospect of lucrative Royal Fleet Auxiliary refit contracts did not help A&P Group, however, and they passed the yard into the hands of the Government of Gibraltar.

A company was set up to run the yard and it became known as Gibraltar Ship Repair. In the early 1990s, the dockyard was taken over by Norway-based engineering and construction services company, Kværner, who ran the yard until 1996, the yard then closed for a period of approximately 18 months.

=== Cammell Laird ===
In 1997, the British shipbuilding company Cammell Laird based in Merseyside, were looking to expand their operations outside the UK and in early 1998 a management team arrived at Gibraltar. The yard was reopened and the first ship docked within a few weeks. The dockyard's future was again put at risk when in early 2001, Cammell Laird Group PLC ran into difficulties, which eventually led to its closure.

When it became inevitable that Cammell Laird Group PLC was to close, senior management in Gibraltar, with the backing of the Government of Gibraltar, were successful in their quest to source the necessary financial assistance to keep the company's Gibraltar operations running.

=== Renaming to Gibdock ===
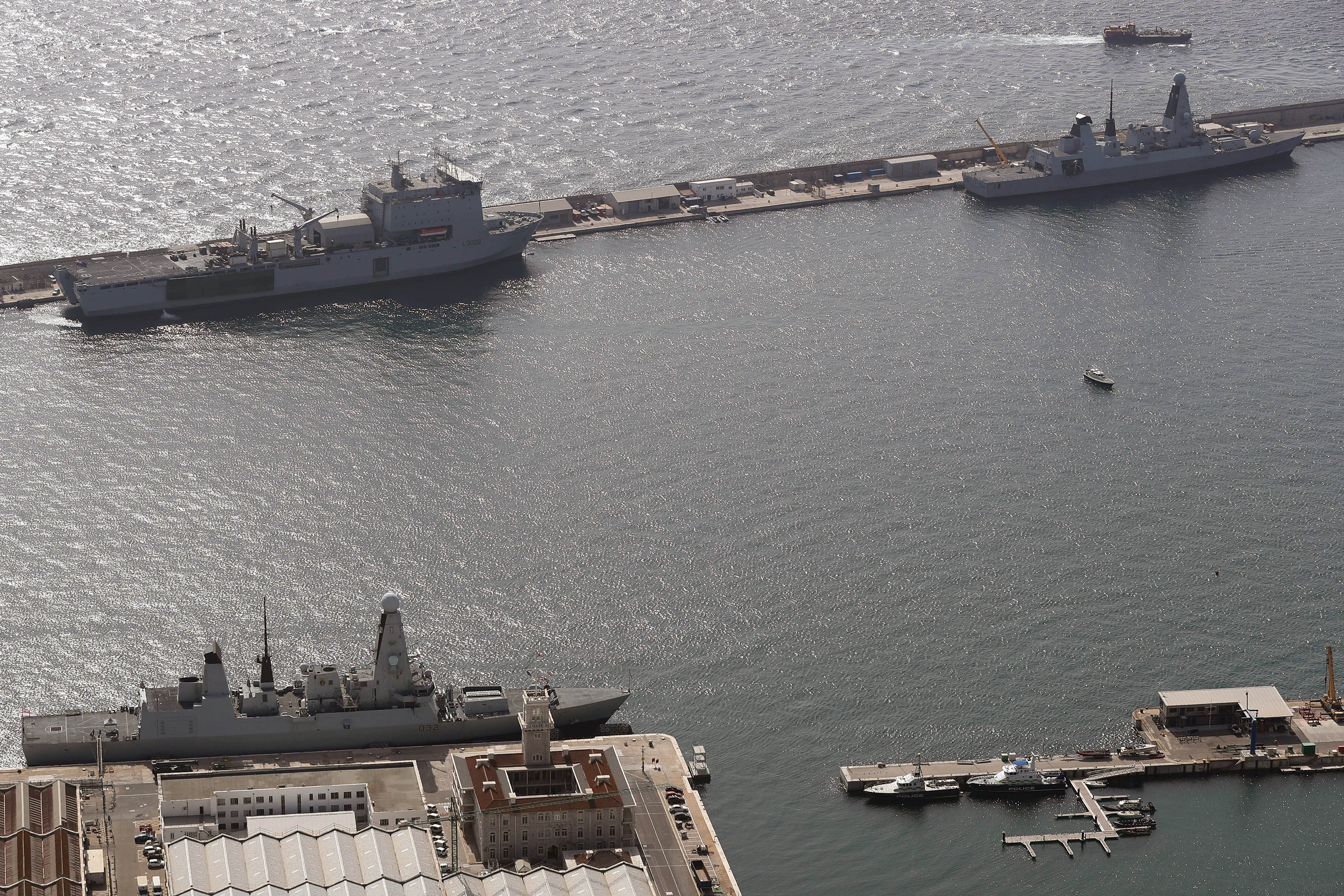
Three Royal Navy ships at Gibdock on 7 September 2016.

During the first quarter of 2006, Cammell Laird Group was sold in its entirety to private investors. The new owner's intention was to continue with the existing business. The company continued to trade as Cammell Laird Gibraltar Ltd until 7 December 2009 when it was renamed Gibdock following the sale of the rights in the historic brand to Northwestern Shiprepairers & Shipbuilders in the UK for an undisclosed sum.

Balaena Ltd

In May 2022, Gibdock Ltd was wholly acquired by a UK company, Balaena Ltd for an undisclosed sum. This acquisition saw the start of a revival of the yards military history, with a significant upswing in usage by the Royal Navy. Balaena Ltd's intention is to use the yard for the fabrication of their own design offshore utility platforms alongside its traditional ship repair usage.

== At present ==
Gibdock currently remains a ship repair and conversion facility, providing repair services to all sectors of the maritime industry.

== See also ==
- Air lock diving-bell plant, a one-of-a-kind mobile barge-mounted engineering caisson used in the Port of Gibraltar
