= Salt City =

Salt City may refer to:

- Salt City (TV series), an Indian television show
- Salt City SC, an American soccer team
- Salt City Roller Derby, a women's flat track roller derby league based in Syracuse, New York
- Salt City Derby Girls, a women's banked track roller derby league based in Salt Lake City, Utah

== See also ==
- Salt Lake City (disambiguation)
- Yancheng, a Chinese city in Jiangsu, literally means "Salt City"
