= D. K. Kulevome =

Ghanaian diplomat

Dziewoanu Kwaku Kulevome

Ghana's Resident Minister to Guinea
- In office 1964–1966
- Appointed by: Kwame Nkrumah
- Preceded by: Kweku Budu-Acquah
- Succeeded by: Legation closed

Personal details
- Occupation: diplomat

Dziewoanu Kwaku Kulevome was a Ghanaian educationist and diplomat. He served as Ghana's Resident Minister to Guinea from 1964 to April 1966, following the overthrow of the Nkrumah government. Upon his return to the Ghana International Airport, his briefcase was snatched and his documents scattered. He was then asked to run barefooted until his feet bled. According to diplomatic sources, this punishment was meted out to him by the military junta for greeting Nkrumah when he arrived at the Conakry Airport after his overthrow. Kulevome was the only Resident Minister to Guinea who was not affiliated with the Convention People's Party. The basis for his appointment being approved was his adequate proficiency in the French language.

Following the overthrow of the erstwhile government, he was appointed Ghana's Consul General in Osaka, Japan in August 1966.

Prior to his appointment, he was an officer at the African Affairs Secretariat. Before entering the Ghanaian Foreign Service, Kulevome was a teacher. He had taught for a period of about twelve years.
