= Salt Lake City (disambiguation) =

Salt Lake City is the capital of the US state of Utah, and the county seat of Salt Lake County.

Salt Lake City may also refer to:

== Places ==
- Downtown Salt Lake City, a district of Salt Lake City
- Salt Lake City metropolitan area, the city and its suburbs
- Bidhannagar, Kolkata, a neighborhood popularly known as Salt Lake City

== Music ==
- "Salt Lake City" (song), a 1965 song by The Beach Boys from their album Summer Days (And Summer Nights!!)

== Transportation ==
- Salt Lake City Intermodal Hub, a multi-modal transportation hub in Salt Lake City
- Salt Lake City International Airport, an airport in western Salt Lake City
- USS Salt Lake City, the name of two ships of the United States Navy
  - USS Salt Lake City (CA-25), a Pensacola-class cruiser, later reclassified as a heavy cruiser (launched in 1927 and decommissioned in 1946)
  - USS Salt Lake City (SSN-716), a Los Angeles-class submarine (launched in 1982 and decommissioned in 2006)

== See also ==
- Salt Lake (disambiguation)
- Salt City (disambiguation)
