= Great Salt Lake (disambiguation) =

Great Salt Lake is a saline lake in Utah, USA; the largest inland saltwater lake in the Western Hemisphere.

Great Salt Lake may also refer to:

== Places ==
- Great Salt Lake State Park, Salt Lake County, Utah, USA
- Great Salt Lake Legacy Parkway Scenic Byway, Davis County, Utah, USA
- Great Salt Lake Desert, Utah, USA; a desert in northern Utah, a dry lake between the Great Salt Lake and Nevada

=== Formerly named ===
- Great Salt Lake City, Utah Territory, USA; former name of Salt Lake City, Utah
- Great Salt Lake County, Utah Territory, USA; former name of Salt Lake County, Utah
- Great Salt Lake Valley, Utah Territory, USA; former name of Salt Lake Valley, Salt Lake County, Utah

== Other uses ==
- "The Great Salt Lake", a 2006 song and single by Band of Horses from the album Everything All the Time
- Great Salt Lake Council, Boy Scouts of America (BSA), a BSA regional administrative council located in Utah, USA

== See also ==
- Great Salt Lake wreck, a 1944 train wreck in Bagley, Utah, USA
- Great Salt Lake effect, a climatological and meteorological lake effect from the Great Salt Lake in Utah, USA
- Great Salt Lake Meridian
- Great Salt Pond (disambiguation)
- Salt Lake (disambiguation)
