= Edward Benjamin Kwesi Ampah Jnr =

Ghanaian author and politician

Member of the Ghana Parliament for Asebu
- In office 1965–1966
- Preceded by: New
- Succeeded by: Constituency abolished

Personal details
- Born: Edward Benjamin Kwesi Ampah Jnr; 6 March 1925 Saltpond, Central Region, Gold Coast
- Party: Convention People's Party
- Education: Accra Academy
- Profession: Author; Politician

Edward Benjamin Kwesi Ampah Jnr, also known by the name Eddie Ampah, was a Ghanaian author and politician. He was the member of parliament for the Asebu constituency from 1965 to 1966.

== Early life and education ==
Ampah was born on 6 March 1925 at Saltpond in the Central Region. He had his secondary education at the Accra Academy from 1941 to 1945.

== Politics ==
Ampah was a Councillor of the Cape Coast Town Council. He was elected chairman of the Cape Coast Municipal Council in 1954. He remained in this position until 1958.

In 1956, he was one of the candidates nominated by the Convention People's Party to represent the Cape Coast electoral area for the 1956 Legislative Assembly elections however, Nathaniel Azarco Welbeck was ultimately selected to contest for the seat. On 1 July 1959 he was appointed district commissioner for Cape Coast and the regional secretary of the Convention People's Party in the Central Region. In 1965 he became the member of parliament for the Asebu constituency. He served in this capacity until 1966 when the Nkrumah government was overthrown.

== Death ==
Ampah Jnr died in the late 1960s.

== Publications ==
- The tears of Dr. Kwame Nkrumah: the Rise of the Convention People's party (1951)
- The Gold Coast Tomorrow (1955)
- Osagyefo in the Central Region (1960)

== See also ==
- List of MPs elected in the 1965 Ghanaian parliamentary election
