= Ayerye Festival =

Festival in Ghana by the people of Saltpond

Ayerye Festival is an annual festival celebrated by the chiefs and people of Akyemfo Nankesedo of the Nkusukum Traditional Area in Saltpond in the Central Region of Ghana. It is usually celebrated in the month of November. The people of Ekumfi Narkwa also celebrate this festival. The people of Enyam-Maim also celebrate this festival.

== Celebrations ==
During the festival, visitors are welcomed to share food and drinks. The people put on traditional clothes, and there is a durbar — a public reception — of chiefs. There is also dancing and drumming.

== Significance ==
This festival is celebrated to mark an event that took place in the past. It is also celebrated to honor their ancestors who fought their way from the Ghana Empire to Techiman and later to their current settlement after going through toils and tribulations. It is also to remind the people of their community it is safe from wicked intruders and the need for them to be vigilant.
