= Trinidad and Tobago dry forests =

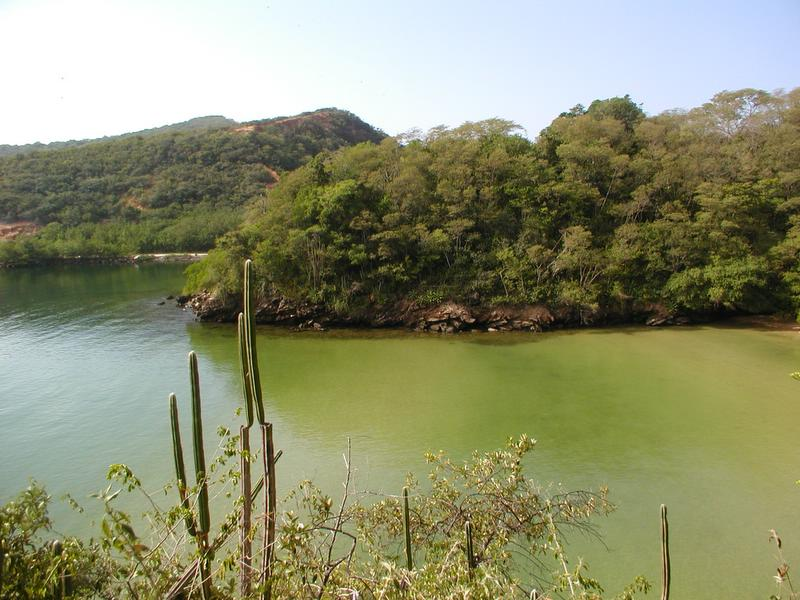
- Tropical dry forest in Chacachacare

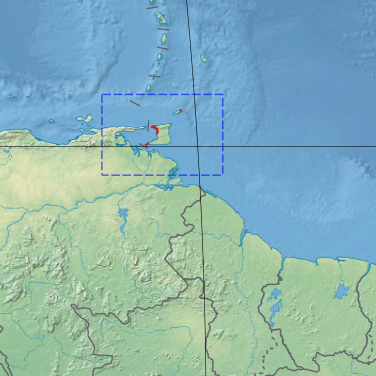
- Ecoregion territory (in red)

Ecology
- Realm: Neotropical
- Biome: tropical and subtropical dry broadleaf forests
- Borders: Trinidad and Tobago moist forests; Trinidad mangroves

Geography
- Country: Trinidad and Tobago

Conservation
- Conservation status: Critical/Endangered

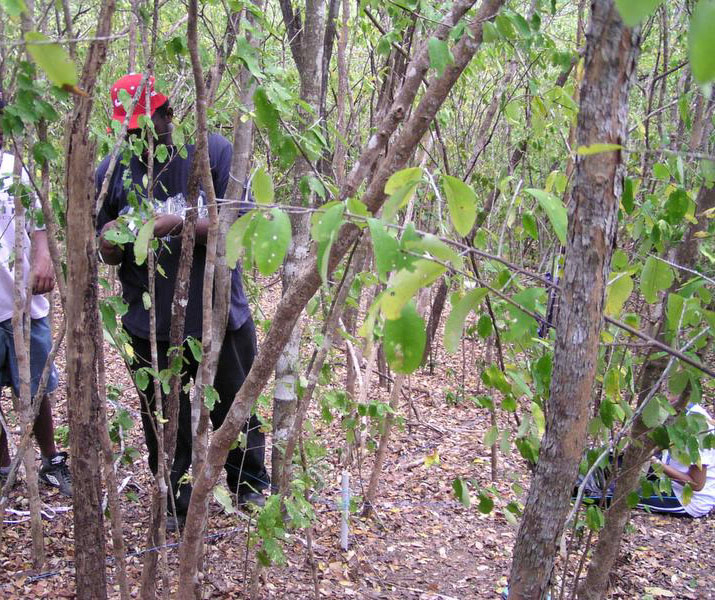
Dry forest on Chacachacare, showing the short, shrubby growth-form of the forest.

Trinidad and Tobago dry forests are tropical dry forests located primarily in western and southern parts of the island of Trinidad, in southern parts of the island of Tobago and on smaller offshore islands including Chacachacare, Monos, Huevos, Gaspar Grande, Little Tobago and Saint Giles Island.

Tropical dry forests in Trinidad and Tobago include both deciduous and semi-evergreen forests. A recent work by Howard Nelson suggests that areas which were formerly classified as evergreen forest also fit the criteria for dry forests. The major areas of dry forest in Trinidad include the Chaguaramas peninsula in the northwest, areas along the south coast of the island, from Cedros to Morne Diablo, and areas along the east coast including parts of the Guayaguayare, Mayaro and Manzanilla coastline. In addition, areas along the west coast including San Fernando Hill and much of the former Sugar Belt also would have originally supported dry forest. In Tobago much of the southwest of the island originally supported dry forests.

The dominant paradigm in phytosociology in Trinidad and Tobago has been the work of John Stanley Beard carried out in the 1940s. His description of forest associations was physiognomically based. Many of his forest associations overlap modern ideas of dry and moist forests. Most work which seeks to classify dry forest in this country, e.g., WWF classification, underestimate the extent of dry forest in Trinidad and Tobago by restricting it to the driest category of forests that Beard came up with for Trinidad.
