= MT Bonsu =

History
- Name: Bonsu (2008–2015); Ditas (1982–2008)
- Port of registry: Georgia
- Launched: 12 June 1982
- Acquired: 1982
- Identification: Call sign: 4LGD2; IMO number: 7726225; MMSI number: 213797000
- Fate: Scrapped

General characteristics
- Type: Oil tanker
- Tonnage: 8,763 GT; 14,805 DWT
- Length: 143 m (469 ft 2 in)
- Beam: 22 m (72 ft 2 in)
- Draught: 8 m (26 ft 3 in)
- Speed: 14.8 knots (27.4 km/h; 17.0 mph)
- Capacity: 16,000 t (16,000 long tons; 18,000 short tons) of oil

MT Bonsu was a 16,000-tonne oil storage vessel that operated off the coast of Ghana in the Saltpond Oil Field. She was commissioned for operations in the field in 2008. Beached and scrapped at Aliağa, Turkey beginning 21 October 2015.
