= Trinidad and Tobago moist forests =

Ecoregion in Trinidad and Tobago

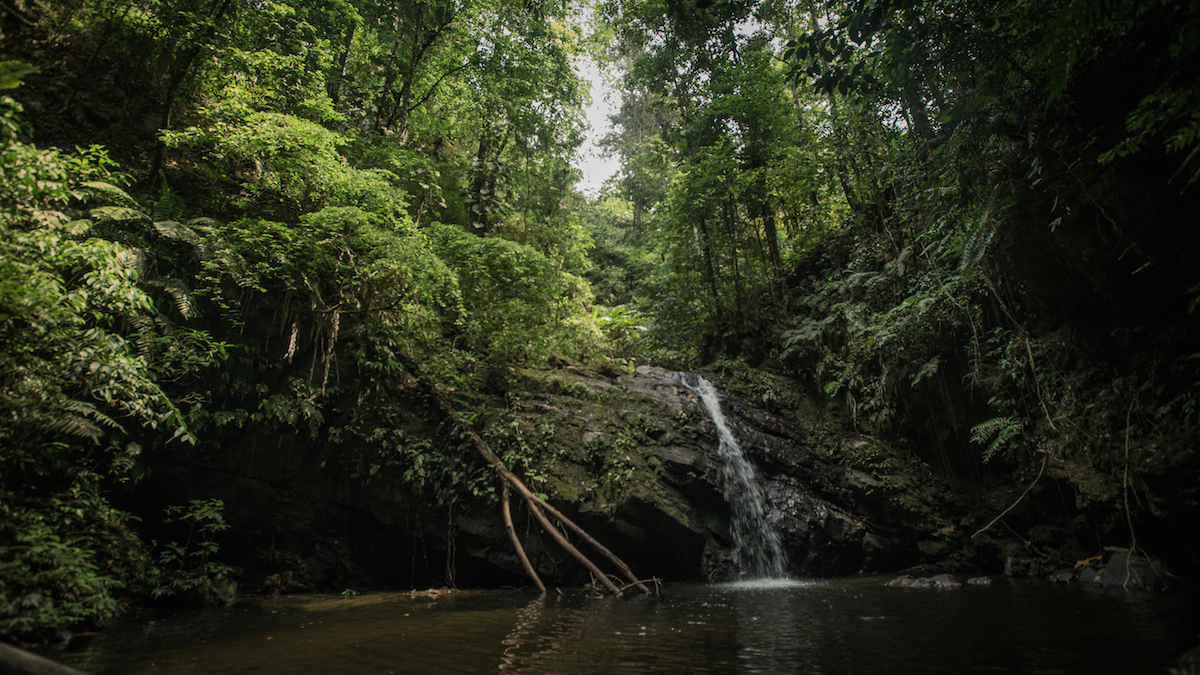
- Waterfall in Waterfall in Grande Riviere, Trinidad

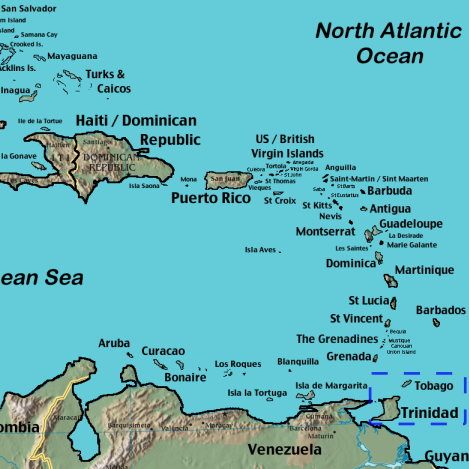
- Ecoregion territory (in blue dashed box)

Ecology
- Realm: Neotropic
- Biome: Tropical and subtropical moist broadleaf forests
- Borders: Trinidad and Tobago dry forests; Trinidad mangroves

Geography
- Area: 4,662 km^{2} (1,800 mi^{2})
- Country: Trinidad and Tobago
- Coordinates: 10.45°N 61.25°W

The Trinidad and Tobago moist forests ecoregion (WWF ID: NT0171) covers most of the islands of Trinidad and Tobago near the coast of South America where the southeastern Caribbean Sea meets the Atlantic Ocean. Small portions of the islands around river estuaries and coastal lowlands are mangroves or dry forests. Species diversity is very high, in particular for plants (over 2,500 species) and birds (over 400 species). Tobago, being much smaller, has fewer species.

== Location and description ==
Approximately 90% of the islands are in this ecoregion. There are a few scattered mangroves of the Trinidad mangroves ecoregion at the main river estuaries, a ring of dry forest of the Trinidad and Tobago dry forests ecoregion around the Caroni Swamp, just south of the capital city of Port of Spain, and a small section of dry forest at the northeast end of Tobago. The islands are affected by the South Equatorial Current from the southeast and the outflow from the Orinoco River to the south. Elevations in the islands are 841 metres (2,759 ft).

== Climate ==
The climate of the ecoregion is Tropical monsoon climate (Köppen climate classification (Am)). This climate is characterized by relatively even temperatures throughout the year (all months being greater than 18 °C (64 °F) average temperature), and a pronounced dry season. The driest month has less than 60 mm of precipitation, but more than (100-(average/25) mm. This climate is mid-way between a tropical rainforest and a tropical savannah. The drier months are in the winter.

== Flora and fauna ==
The island of Trinidad is only 20 km from the mainland of South America, and a land bridge existed as late as 1,500 years ago, making the flora and fauna most similar to those of the continent. The island of Tobago is a further 40 km from the northern edge of Trinidad, and its land bridge disappeared 11,500 years ago, but its species mix is similar to the larger island. Over 60% of the island is still covered with closed broadleaf evergreen forest.

The islands have high species diversity, with over 2,500 species of plants identified, of which up to 110 are endemic to the island. Also reported 100 species of mammals (bats and rodents predominate), 400 of birds, 85 of reptiles, and 30 of amphibians. Characteristic tree species are andiroba (Carapa guianensis), andiroba (Ceiba pentandra), yellow mombin (Spondias mombin), Pentaclethra macroloba, and Brownea latifolia. A notable tree species in eastern Trinidad is the Mora tree.

== Protected areas ==
Officially protected areas in the ecoregion include:

- Main Ridge, Tobago
- Aripo Savannas
