= Air lock diving-bell plant =

Underwater work support barge used at Gibraltar

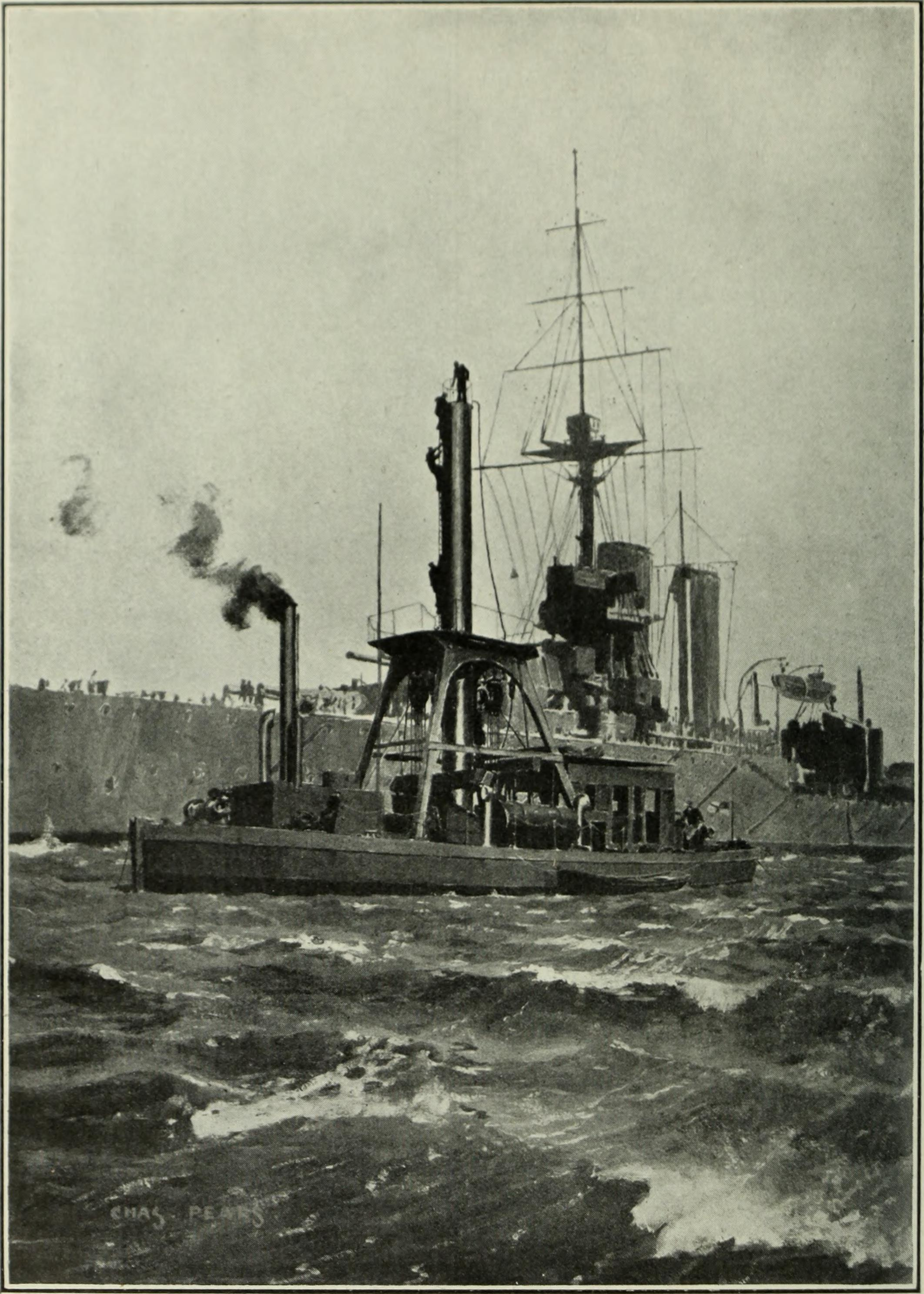
The barge as depicted in a painting by Charles Pears

Gibraltar Harbour's air lock diving-bell plant, or caisson diving bell barge, was a purpose-built barge for the laying, examination and repair of moorings for battleships. It was designed by Siebe Gorman & Company of Lambeth and Forrestt & Co. Ltd of Wivenhoe in Essex, who built and supplied it in 1902 for the British Admiralty.

Local conditions at Gibraltar dictated the need for such a craft. The heavy harbour moorings have three chains extending out radially along the seabed from a central ring, each terminating in a large anchor. Most harbours have a soft seabed, and it is usual to lay down moorings by settling anchors in the mud, clay or sand, but this could not be done in Gibraltar harbour where the seabed is hard rock.

For Gibraltar the seabed needed to be dug out sufficiently for an anchor point to hold. The barge would be towed over the work site, moored in place with anchors, and the bell would be lowered to the seabed. Air pumped into the bell would displace the water, and workers accessed the bell through the airlock in the central access shaft. This system allowed continuous work with changes of workmen in four-hour shifts, and allowed men to work on the seabed in normal work clothing.

In 1969 the Gibraltar Chronicle reported the plant as still working in the harbour; it was believed to be the only vessel of its type in the world.

== Description ==
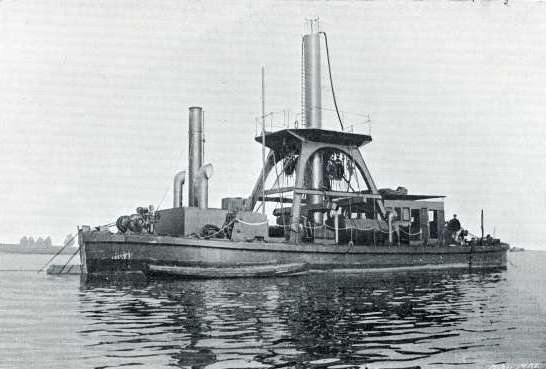
Pictured on trials at Wivenhoe 1902

The specially commissioned steel barge weighing 346 tons was 85 feet (26 m) long, with a beam of 38 feet 6 inches (11.73 m); a draught of 7 feet 3 inches (2.21 m), and moulded depth 7 feet 9 inches (2.36 m). The plant was fitted out with an air lock diving-bell system, a decompression chamber and other rescue equipment.

The bell had a working chamber measuring 15 ft (4.6 m) long, by 10 feet 6 inches (3.20 m) wide by 7 feet 6 inches (2.29 m) high. The central access shaft was 37 feet 6 inches (11.43 m) high and 3 ft (0.91 m) in diameter. The bell was built by Siebe Gorman at their factory in Lambeth of steel plates, with cast-iron ballast, and its total weight was about 46 tons. It was electrically lit and fitted with a telephone for communicating with the air-compressor and lifting-winch rooms on the barge, and a compressed air rock drill. The air-lock bell was effectively a mobile engineering caisson, and the barge was its launch and recovery system.

The wire ropes for lowering and raising the bell worked over pulleys mounted on a lifting frame superstructure erected over a well through the centre of the hull. Two sets of air compressors were fitted on the deck, one set for supplying air to the bell, the other for powering the pneumatic rock drill. The greatest depth at which the bell could work was 40 ft (12 m).

The bell commonly worked at a little lower than 15 psi (100 kPa) roughly one atmosphere more than sea level atmospheric pressure; equal to a depth of approximately 35 feet (11 m) of water.

== Construction ==
The Admiralty ordered the vessel for His Majesty's Dockyard in early 1902. It was designed by Siebe Gorman of Lambeth and Forrestt & Co. Ltd of Wivenhoe in Essex, who built and supplied it in 1902 The plant was also trialled by Forrestt at their yard on the upstream side of the River Colne in Wivenhoe. This company, established in 1788, had a long track record in the construction of specialized vessels and naval equipment for the Admiralty, as well as the War Office, Crown Agents, and the Royal National Lifeboat Institution.

The yard's Loft book confirms the vessel was completed in 1902 and its yard number as 463. Forrestt's boilermakers constructed the bell at Wivenhoe to Siebe Gorman's design. Her trials took place on the River Colne before September, and she was the "subject of great interest to the fish, numbers of which attracted by the light (from within the bell), swarmed around it". The completed diving-bell barge was towed direct from Wivenhoe to Gibraltar. Shortly after its delivery, back home in England, the Essex Newsman reported: "Henry Turner, mariner, was charged with being drunk and disorderly at Wivenhoe, on 1 September 1902. It was stated the defendant had gone to Gibraltar in the diving-bell barge recently built at Wivenhoe for the Admiralty. PC Hailstone said the defendant used the worst language he ever heard in his twenty years service. Fined 10s and 4s costs".

The cost to the Admiralty of the entire plant, including the barge, was about £14,000. An illustration of the plant was included in the influential 1909 Diving Manual by Sir Robert Davis, who was head of design at Siebe Gorman at the time.

== Operations ==
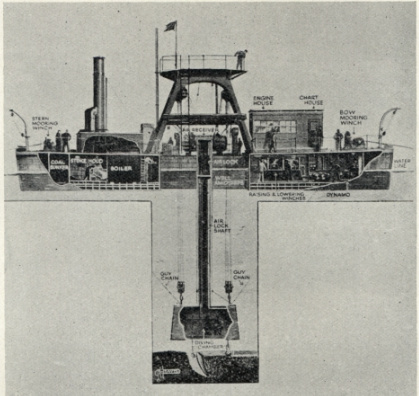
A cross section of the mobile air lock diving bell

Working inside the bell on the sea floor

The Plant's task was to bury each of three anchors for a mooring deep into the seabed.

A mooring vessel (in the 1960s, HMS Moorland) would first lay out the mooring components in position.

Good weather was required for operation of the bell, and the barge would be moored with six or eight anchors to keep it in place. The barge had no means of propulsion, and was towed into place over each mooring anchor by tugs which also laid out the barge's anchors. Once anchored, the barge was capable of making fine adjustments to its position by using the winches to haul on the anchors.

The access tube on the bell was sealed at the top, making it airtight, and the bell lowered through a moon pool to the seabed over the position where the anchor was to be bedded. A compressor was used to equalize the air pressure inside the bell and access tube with the water pressure at the bottom opening of the bell, this would displace the water in the bell and leave an air-filled space above the level of the rim in which workers could operate. The working chamber of the bell was bottomless, allowing workmen to stand and work directly on the seabed within an air filled space.

Men would climb down into the entry tube and through an airlock and then go down a vertical ladder into the working chamber. Once the anchor's position was marked, a winch (mounted on the deck's lifting frame, its wires passing through the chamber) would lift the anchor and the barge would move, placing the anchor to one side. The barge would then return to its original position and four men in the chamber would commence digging a hole big enough for placement of the anchor.

Working in dank, dingy, pressurized conditions, the men would skim off a thin layer of mud and attack the rock, first with pickaxes; as the hole deepened, one man would hold a crowbar for another to swing a sledgehammer. The rock, chipped out into boulders, would then be passed up by hands from the hole. Digging the hole would take two or three days until it was shoulder-high and deep enough for the anchor.

Once the anchors were embedded in the holes, the mooring tender vessel would take the place of the barge to complete the mooring system, using her two 10-ton winches for the job in hand. The completed moorings would then be left in place, with buoys for markers, as permanent installations.

== The 1960s ==
The plant showing a modified funnel after a boiler refit

At some point the barge had a new boiler installed, its cabin enlarged to suit, and a new, larger funnel fitted. In 1969 the Gibraltar Chronicle reported the plant as still working in the harbour; it was believed to be the only vessel of its type in the world. The system described was used for providing moorings in the late 1960s for the Mr. Louie oil rig when it visited the Bay.

== Moorland ==
Mooring vessel Moorland

The mooring vessel HMS Moorland was built in 1938 on the Clyde by William Simons & Co of Renfrew. She initially served at Scapa, and then in the late 1940s on the Clyde and Rosyth, before being transferred to Gibraltar in 1961. She was to end her days sunk as target practice for HMS Juno on 26 January 1971 in the western Mediterranean. Moorland was fitted with two 10-ton winches capable of heavy lifts from the seabed, and carried all the cables and anchors required for laying the moorings. The vessel was crewed by a Master, two engineers, and ten ratings — five for the deck and five for the engine room. In addition, when on mooring duty, she also carried a chargeman (supervisory worker) and twelve deckhands.
