= Hanggin Banner =

Hanggin Banner 杭锦旗 • ᠬᠠᠩᠭᠢᠨ ᠬᠣᠰᠢᠭᠤ
- Banner
- Location of the seat in Inner Mongolia Hanggin (China)
- Coordinates: 39°50′N 108°44′E
- Country: China
- Autonomous region: Inner Mongolia
- Prefecture-level city: Ordos
- Banner seat: Xin Town

Area
  - Total: 19,000 km^{2} (7,300 sq mi)
- Elevation: 1,391 m (4,564 ft)

Population (2020)
  - Total: 110,824
  - Density: 5.8/km^{2} (15/sq mi)
- Time zone: UTC+8 (China Standard)
- Website: www.hjq.gov.cn

Hanggin Banner

Chinese name
- Traditional Chinese: 杭錦旗
- Simplified Chinese: 杭锦旗
- Postal: Hangkin
Transcriptions
Standard Mandarin
- Hanyu Pinyin: Hángjǐn Qí
- Wade–Giles: Hang-chin Ch‘i

Mongolian name
- Mongolian Cyrillic: Хангин хошуу
- Mongolian script: ᠬᠠᠩᠭᠢᠨ ᠬᠣᠰᠢᠭᠤ
Transcriptions
- SASM/GNC: Qaŋɣin Qosiɣu

Hanggin Banner or Hangjin Banner is a banner in southwest Inner Mongolia, China. Occupying the northwest corner of the Ordos Loop, it is under the administration of Ordos Prefecture and is bordered by Dalad Banner to the east, Otog Banner to the southwest, and Bayan Nur to the north.

== Geography ==
Most of Hanggin Banner is occupied by the northern half of the Ordos Desert. Its central basin formerly held the salt lake Dabasun Nor, whose salt was harvested and sold throughout the neighboring provinces during the Qing Dynasty.

== Administrative divisions ==
Hanggin Banner is made up of 5 towns, and 1 sum.

Name	Simplified Chinese	Hanyu Pinyin	Mongolian (Hudum Script)	Mongolian (Cyrillic)	Administrative division code
Towns
Xin Town	锡尼镇	Xīní Zhèn	ᠰᠢᠨᠡ ᠪᠠᠯᠭᠠᠰᠤ	Шанаа балгас	150625100
Balgan Town	巴拉贡镇	Bālāgòng Zhèn	ᠪᠠᠯᠭᠤᠨ ᠪᠠᠯᠭᠠᠰᠤ	Балган балгас	150625101
Jargalangt Town	吉日嘎朗图镇	Jírìgālǎngtú Zhèn	ᠵᠢᠷᠭᠠᠯᠠᠩᠲᠤ ᠪᠠᠯᠭᠠᠰᠤ	Жаргалант балгас	150625102
Dugui Tal Town	独贵塔拉镇	Dúguìtǎlā Zhèn	ᠳᠤᠭᠤᠢᠲᠠᠯ᠎ᠠ ᠪᠠᠯᠭᠠᠰᠤ	Дугуйдлаа балгас	150625103
Hoh Mod Town	呼和木独镇	Hūhémùdú Zhèn	ᠬᠥᠬᠡᠮᠣᠳᠣ ᠪᠠᠯᠭᠠᠰᠤ	Хээмт балгас	150625104
Sum
Ih Us Sum	伊和乌素苏木	Yīhéwūsù Sūmù	ᠶᠡᠬᠡᠤ᠋ᠰᠤ ᠰᠤᠮᠤ	Ихүүс сум	150625200

Other: Hanggin Economic Development Zone, Ordos, Inner Mongolia (内蒙古鄂尔多斯杭锦经济开发区)

== Climate ==
Climate data for Hanggin Banner, elevation 1,414 m (4,639 ft), (1991–2020 normals, extremes 1981–2010)
Month	Jan	Feb	Mar	Apr	May	Jun	Jul	Aug	Sep	Oct	Nov	Dec	Year
Record high °C (°F)	11.8 (53.2)	17.5 (63.5)	24.4 (75.9)	34.5 (94.1)	33.2 (91.8)	37.4 (99.3)	38.1 (100.6)	36.1 (97.0)	35.2 (95.4)	26.3 (79.3)	20.4 (68.7)	14.5 (58.1)	38.1 (100.6)
Mean daily maximum °C (°F)	−3.4 (25.9)	1.4 (34.5)	8.4 (47.1)	16.4 (61.5)	22.5 (72.5)	27.1 (80.8)	29.1 (84.4)	26.8 (80.2)	21.5 (70.7)	14.4 (57.9)	5.6 (42.1)	−1.9 (28.6)	14.0 (57.2)
Daily mean °C (°F)	−10.8 (12.6)	−6.2 (20.8)	1.1 (34.0)	9.3 (48.7)	15.8 (60.4)	20.7 (69.3)	22.7 (72.9)	20.5 (68.9)	14.9 (58.8)	7.3 (45.1)	−1.4 (29.5)	−8.8 (16.2)	7.1 (44.8)
Mean daily minimum °C (°F)	−16.2 (2.8)	−12.0 (10.4)	−4.9 (23.2)	2.4 (36.3)	8.6 (47.5)	13.9 (57.0)	16.4 (61.5)	14.9 (58.8)	9.4 (48.9)	1.8 (35.2)	−6.3 (20.7)	−13.8 (7.2)	1.2 (34.1)
Record low °C (°F)	−29.7 (−21.5)	−29.5 (−21.1)	−25.5 (−13.9)	−13.5 (7.7)	−5.5 (22.1)	0.4 (32.7)	5.7 (42.3)	4.7 (40.5)	−3.2 (26.2)	−13.3 (8.1)	−23.8 (−10.8)	−32.3 (−26.1)	−32.3 (−26.1)
Average precipitation mm (inches)	1.2 (0.05)	2.1 (0.08)	5.3 (0.21)	10.7 (0.42)	23.2 (0.91)	38.1 (1.50)	76.1 (3.00)	71.3 (2.81)	43.2 (1.70)	16.9 (0.67)	5.7 (0.22)	1.4 (0.06)	295.2 (11.63)
Average precipitation days (≥ 0.1 mm)	1.7	2.0	3.0	3.0	5.5	8.3	10.6	10.1	7.5	4.1	2.5	1.7	60
Average snowy days	3.5	3.7	3.5	1.3	0.2	0	0	0	0	1.1	2.5	3.8	19.6
Average relative humidity (%)	54	46	38	33	35	43	54	59	57	51	51	53	48
Mean monthly sunshine hours	223.7	218.8	255.0	272.1	300.2	290.7	285.3	267.4	245.1	249.0	218.1	212.1	3,037.5
Percentage possible sunshine	74	72	68	68	67	65	63	64	67	73	74	73	69
Source: China Meteorological Administration

Climate data for Yihewusu Sumu (Yikewusu), Hanggin Banner, elevation 1,180 m (3,870 ft), (1991–2020 normals)
Month	Jan	Feb	Mar	Apr	May	Jun	Jul	Aug	Sep	Oct	Nov	Dec	Year
Mean daily maximum °C (°F)	−2.2 (28.0)	2.9 (37.2)	10.1 (50.2)	18.3 (64.9)	24.6 (76.3)	29.4 (84.9)	31.3 (88.3)	29.0 (84.2)	23.7 (74.7)	16.3 (61.3)	7.2 (45.0)	−0.5 (31.1)	15.8 (60.5)
Daily mean °C (°F)	−10.7 (12.7)	−5.8 (21.6)	2.1 (35.8)	10.7 (51.3)	17.5 (63.5)	22.6 (72.7)	24.6 (76.3)	22.3 (72.1)	16.4 (61.5)	8.3 (46.9)	−0.6 (30.9)	−8.2 (17.2)	8.3 (46.9)
Mean daily minimum °C (°F)	−17.0 (1.4)	−12.5 (9.5)	−4.9 (23.2)	3.2 (37.8)	9.9 (49.8)	15.2 (59.4)	18.0 (64.4)	16.0 (60.8)	10.1 (50.2)	2.0 (35.6)	−6.2 (20.8)	−14.0 (6.8)	1.6 (35.0)
Average precipitation mm (inches)	0.9 (0.04)	1.3 (0.05)	3.6 (0.14)	7.5 (0.30)	13.5 (0.53)	26.4 (1.04)	52.0 (2.05)	42.1 (1.66)	24.8 (0.98)	9.2 (0.36)	4.0 (0.16)	0.8 (0.03)	186.1 (7.34)
Average precipitation days (≥ 0.1 mm)	0.9	1.0	2.1	2.1	3.8	5.7	8.4	7.2	5.3	3.0	1.8	1.2	42.5
Average snowy days	1.4	1.6	1.4	0.6	0	0	0	0	0	0.3	1.4	1.5	8.2
Average relative humidity (%)	52	42	34	28	30	38	48	53	52	46	48	51	44
Mean monthly sunshine hours	230.6	227.9	264.7	281.3	314.4	301.4	296.1	286.9	253.7	264.1	228.9	220.0	3,170
Percentage possible sunshine	76	75	71	70	70	67	66	68	69	78	78	76	72
Source: China Meteorological Administration
