= Trinidad mangroves =

Ecoregion in Trinidad

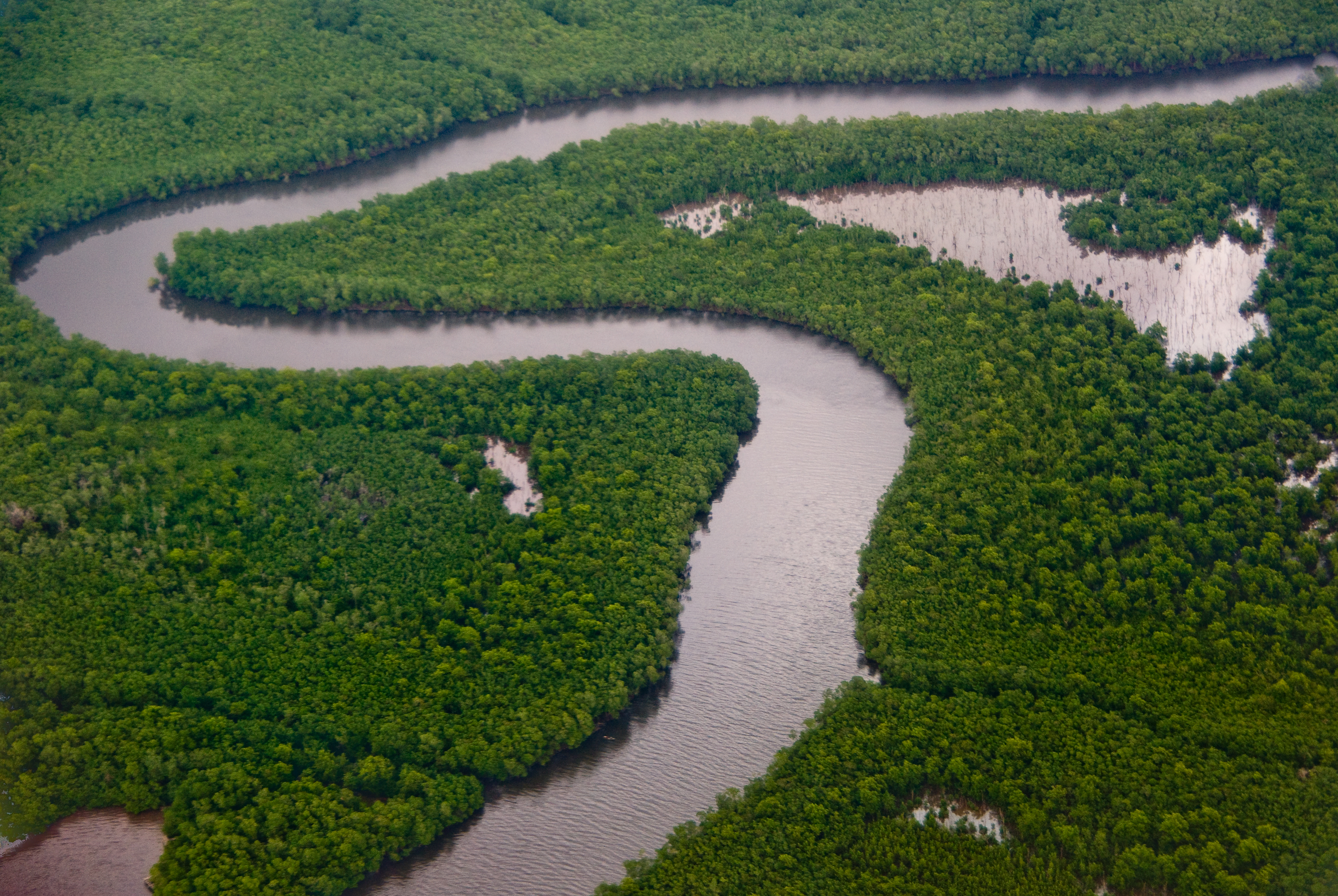
- Caroni Swamp, Trinidad and Tobago

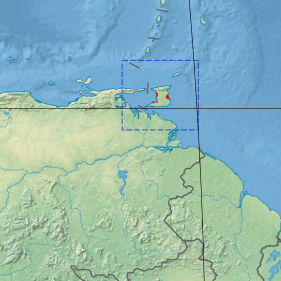
- Ecoregion territory (in red)

Ecology
- Realm: Neotropic
- Biome: Mangroves

Geography
- Area: 259 km^{2} (100 sq mi)
- Country: Trinidad and Tobago
- Coordinates: 10.42°N 61.05°W

The Trinidad mangroves ecoregion (WWF ID: NT1436) covers the separate mangrove forest areas on the coast of the island of Trinidad, in the country of Trinidad and Tobago. The character of the mangroves is affected by the large amount of fresh water flowing out of the Orinoco River and Amazon River to the south, which flow northwest around the island. The mangroves of Trinidad are found on all coasts, and are usually in the estuaries of rivers, but also found in coastal lagoons.

== Location and description ==
The largest wetland on Trinidad is the Nariva Swamp, a permanent brackish lagoon, on the east coast. It is separated from the sea by a sand bar, and has a salinity of 18-25 ‰. The water level typically fluctuates by 0.6 - 1.9 meters. The second largest is the Caroni Swamp, formed where the Caroni River enters Gulf of Paria just south of Port of Spain in the northwest of the island. The ecoregion surrounding the mangroves on the inland side is Trinidad and Tobago moist forests, except for the Caroni Swamp, which is surrounded by a thin band of Trinidad and Tobago dry forests.

== Climate ==
The climate of the ecoregion is Tropical rainforest climate (Köppen climate classification (Af)). This climate is characterized as hot, humid, and having at least 60 mm of precipitation every month. Precipitation in the ecoregion averages 1,556 mm/year. The wet season is June to November.

== Flora and fauna ==
The most common mangrove tree species is red mangrove (Rhizophora mangle), which can reach 17 meters in height and is typically found along the margins of channels with other Rhizophora species. These include Rhizophora harrisonii and Rhizophora racemosa, especially on the east coast swamps. Black mangrove (Avicennia germinans) generally grow in stands by themselves and may reach 23 meters in height. Other species, such as Avicennia schaueriana, white mangrove (Laguncularia racemosa), and button mangrove (Conocarpus erectus) are found in small stands.

== Protected areas ==
There are officially protected areas in the two largest mangrove areas:

- Nariva Swamp, a patchwork of mangrove swamp forest, palm forest, swamp, and freshwater marsh.
- Caroni Swamp, a mangrove forest wetland where the Caroni River goes through it.
- Bon Accord Lagoon
