= Saltpond =

Town in Central Region, Ghana

- Town
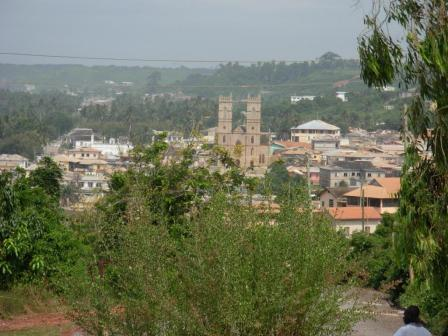
- View of Saltpond's skyline and town centre

- Location of Saltpond in Central region
- Coordinates: 5°12′N 1°4′W
- Country: Ghana
- Region: Central Region
- District: Mfantsiman Municipal
- Elevation: 1 m (3.3 ft)

Population (2013)
  - Total: 24,689
  - Ethnicities: Akan; Ga; Ewe; Ashanti; Akuapem
- Time zone: GMT
  - Summer (DST): GMT
- Postal code: CM
- Area code: 033
- Climate: Aw
- Website: mfantsemanma.gov.gh

Saltpond is a town in, and the capital of, the Mfantsiman Municipal District in the Central Region of Ghana. As of 2013, Saltpond has a population of 24,689 people.

Major ethnic groups who lived in the town are the Akan, Ga, Ewe, Ashanti, and Akuapem. Major economic sectors in the town are petroleum, agriculture, fishing, trade, commerce, and industry.

== Economy ==
Ever since oil was discovered of the shore of Saltpond in 1970, the town is noted for offshore crude oil resources. Saltpond Offshore Producing Company Limited, and two joint venture partners operate the Saltpond Oil Field.

Another important economic sector is agriculture. Due to its proximity to the coast, fishing is popular among the population. Beach resorts can also be found all along the coast. Other major economic sectors in Saltpond are trade, commerce, and industry.

== Demographics ==
93.8% of the population is religious, while the other 6.2% are not affiliated with any religion. The most largest religion in the town is Christianity (84%); of these, 26.9% are Pentecostal/Charismatic, 23.7% are Protestant, 13% are Catholic, and 21.3% practice other forms of Christianity. Next are Islam (6.9%), traditional religions (0.8%), and other religions (1.4%).

Major ethnic groups who live in the town are the Akan, Ga, Ewe, Ashanti, and Akuapem.

== Geography ==
Saltpond is located in the Mfantseman Municipal District, which has an area of 300.662 square kilometres (116.086 sq mi). The district is bordered by the Abura-Asebu-Kwamankese District to the west, Ajumako-Enyan-Essiam District to the northeast, Ekumfi District to the east, and the Gulf of Guinea to the south.

=== Climate ===
Saltpond has a relatively dry tropical savanna climate (Köppen Aw) with two rainy seasons: a heavier one from March to July and a secondary wetter period in October and November. Despite the modest rainfall, humidity is high, notably in the shorter dry season centred on August and September when the cold Benguela Current extends into the Northern Hemisphere. The mean maximum temperatures on a monthly bases ranges around 29.65 °C (85.37 °F) while the mean minimum temperatures are around 23.45 °C (74.21 °F).

Climate data for Saltpond (1991-2020)
Month	Jan	Feb	Mar	Apr	May	Jun	Jul	Aug	Sep	Oct	Nov	Dec	Year
Record high °C (°F)	35.6 (96.1)	35.5 (95.9)	35.5 (95.9)	35.0 (95.0)	34.4 (93.9)	32.2 (90.0)	31.9 (89.4)	29.7 (85.5)	30.6 (87.1)	32.8 (91.0)	35.0 (95.0)	35.0 (95.0)	35.0 (95.0)
Mean daily maximum °C (°F)	31.0 (87.8)	31.6 (88.9)	31.6 (88.9)	31.3 (88.3)	30.5 (86.9)	28.8 (83.8)	27.5 (81.5)	27.0 (80.6)	28.0 (82.4)	29.6 (85.3)	30.9 (87.6)	31.1 (88.0)	29.9 (85.8)
Daily mean °C (°F)	27.2 (81.0)	28.0 (82.4)	28.1 (82.6)	27.9 (82.2)	27.4 (81.3)	26.2 (79.2)	25.3 (77.5)	24.8 (76.6)	25.6 (78.1)	26.5 (79.7)	27.2 (81.0)	27.4 (81.3)	26.8 (80.2)
Mean daily minimum °C (°F)	23.3 (73.9)	24.5 (76.1)	24.6 (76.3)	24.6 (76.3)	24.2 (75.6)	23.7 (74.7)	23.1 (73.6)	22.6 (72.7)	23.2 (73.8)	23.4 (74.1)	23.6 (74.5)	23.7 (74.7)	23.7 (74.7)
Record low °C (°F)	16.5 (61.7)	18.2 (64.8)	19.3 (66.7)	20.4 (68.7)	20.5 (68.9)	19.0 (66.2)	18.0 (64.4)	18.5 (65.3)	20.0 (68.0)	19.8 (67.6)	20.4 (68.7)	18.0 (64.4)	16.5 (61.7)
Average precipitation mm (inches)	16.9 (0.67)	23.2 (0.91)	72.1 (2.84)	98.3 (3.87)	212.7 (8.37)	226.6 (8.92)	66.8 (2.63)	26.7 (1.05)	43.8 (1.72)	108.3 (4.26)	54.3 (2.14)	24.8 (0.98)	974.5 (38.36)
Average precipitation days (≥ 1.0 mm)	1.5	1.9	4.0	6.5	10.2	11.4	6.0	4.3	6.1	8.1	4.2	2.0	66.2
Average relative humidity (%) (at 15:00)	74	73	72	73	77	82	81	81	80	77	73	72	76
Mean monthly sunshine hours	202.6	207.7	224.4	225.2	213.2	157.7	163.0	143.3	168.0	232.9	242.3	231.7	2,412
Mean daily sunshine hours	7.1	7.7	7.5	7.3	6.5	3.9	5.5	6.1	5.5	7.9	8.4	8.1	6.8
Source 1: NOAA
Source 2: Deutscher Wetterdienst (humidity 1973-1994, daily sun 1958-1962)

== Human resources ==
=== Health ===
The primary hospital in the town is the Saltpond Municipal Government Hospital. It was established in 1920 by Sir Gordon Guggisberg with the purpose of serving officers from the Ghana Navy until it was renovated and transferred to the government in 1951.

=== Education ===
One notable educational institution in Saltpond is the Mfantsiman Girls' Senior High School, an all-girls second cycle institution and founded by Kwame Nkrumah in 1960.

== Notable people ==
- Nana Akua Owusu Afriyie, politician, deputy minister for Information; member of Parliament for Ablekuma North constituency
- Ama Ata Aidoo, writer and former minister of Education
- Francis Allotey, mathematical physicist
- Edward Benjamin Kwesi Ampah Jnr, author and politician, former member of parliament
- Kofi Baako, politician, minister of State in the first republic
- Kwamena Bentsi-Enchill, academic and judge, justice of the Supreme Court of Ghana (1971–1972)
- Kweku Budu-Acquah, diplomat
- Kwesi Dickson, theologian, seventh president of the Methodist Church Ghana
- Kobina Hagan, politician, former member of parliament
- Kobina Arku Korsah, jurist, first chief justice of Ghana
- J. N. K. Taylor, judge, justice of the Supreme Court of Ghana (1980–1990)

== Gallery ==
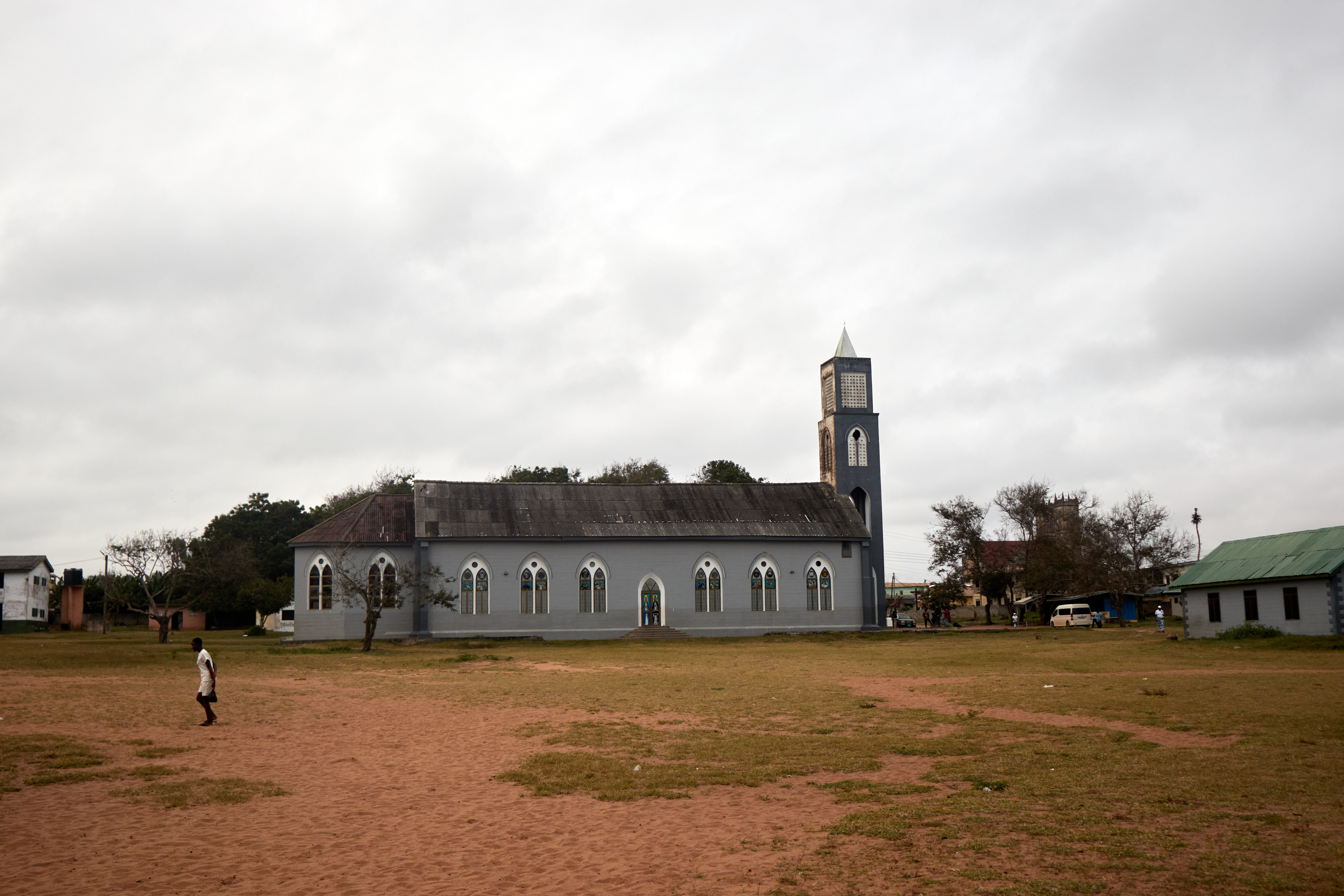
St.John_the_Baptist_Catholic_church,_Saltpond_5

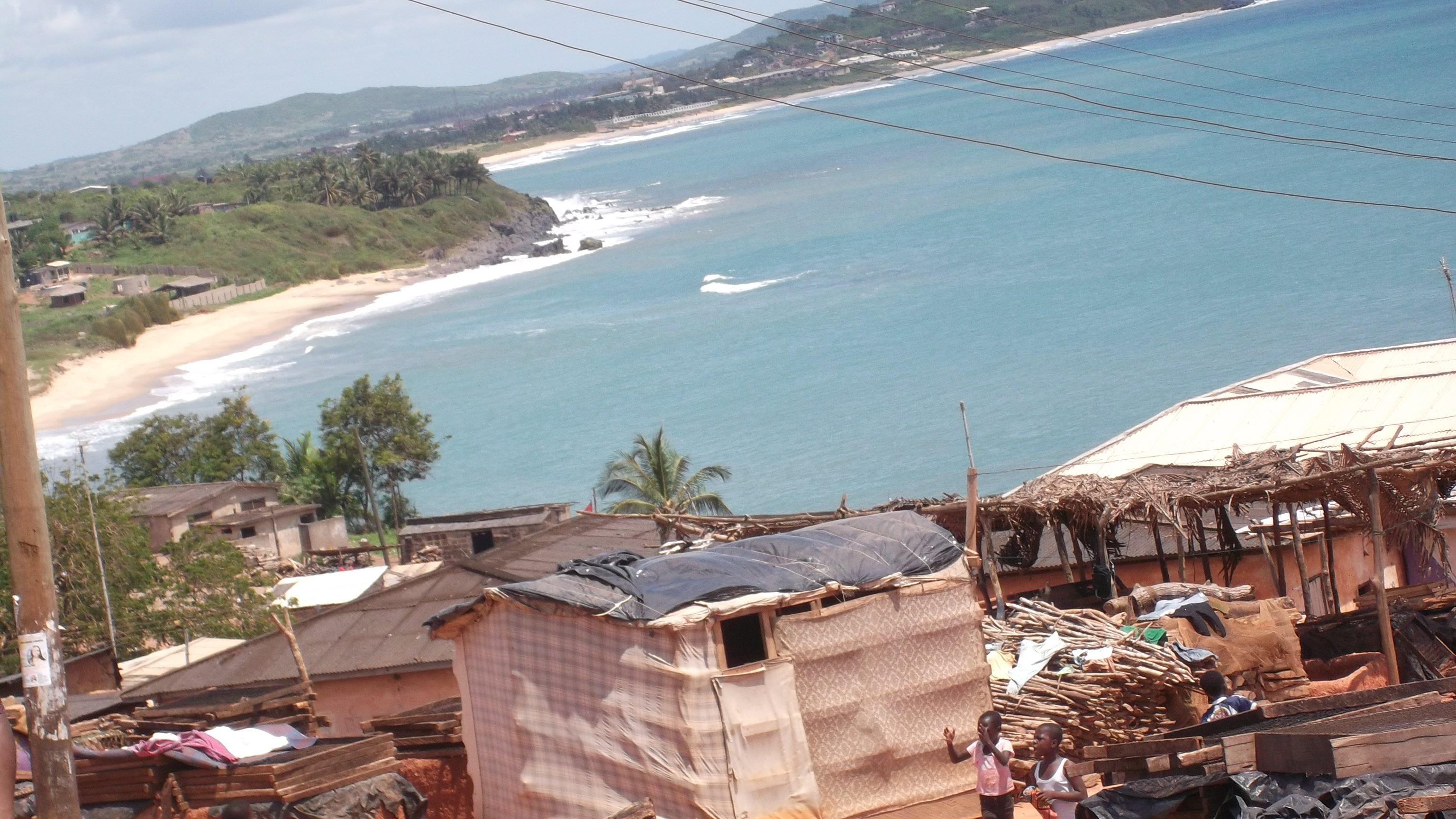
saltpond beach

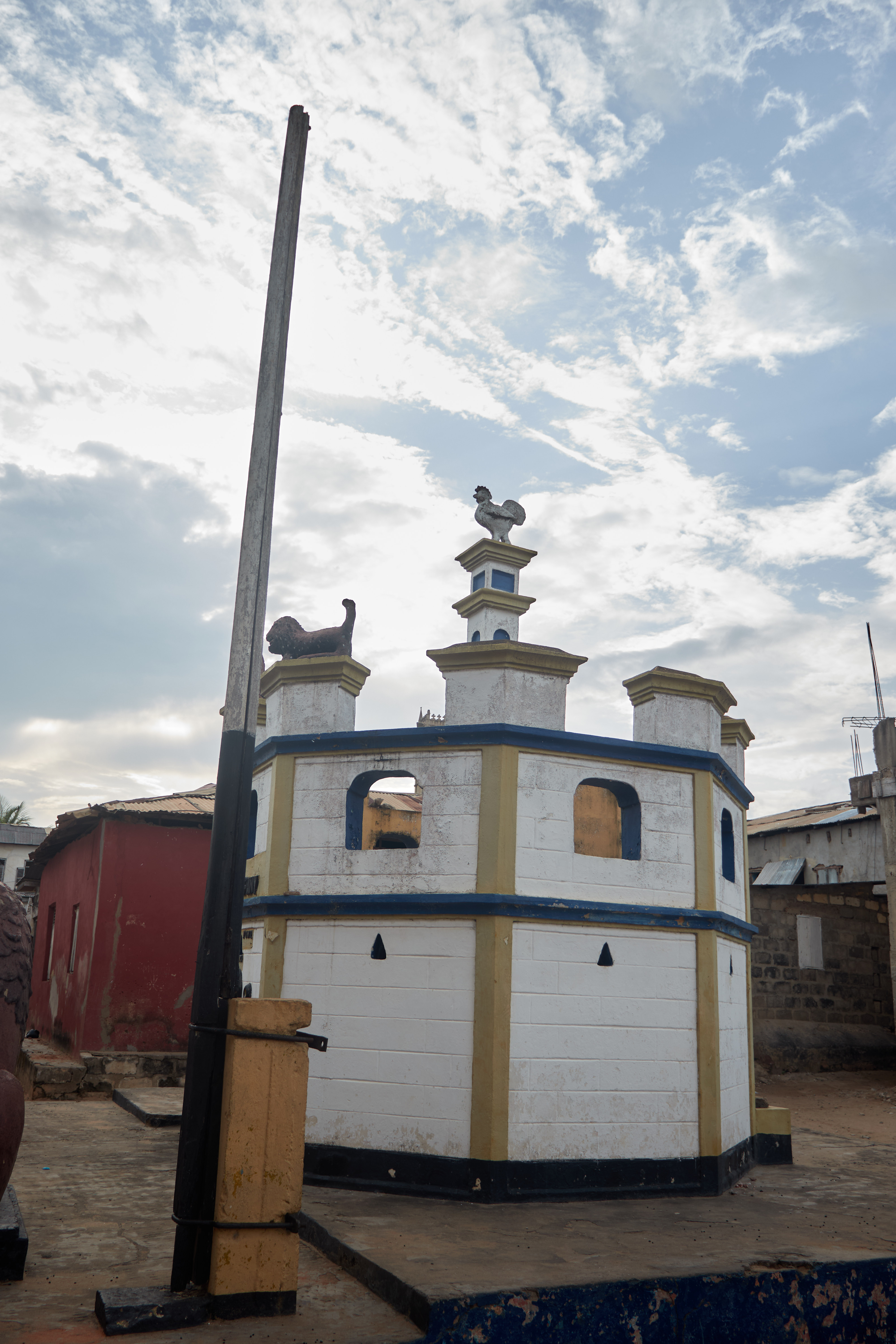
pusuban in saltpond

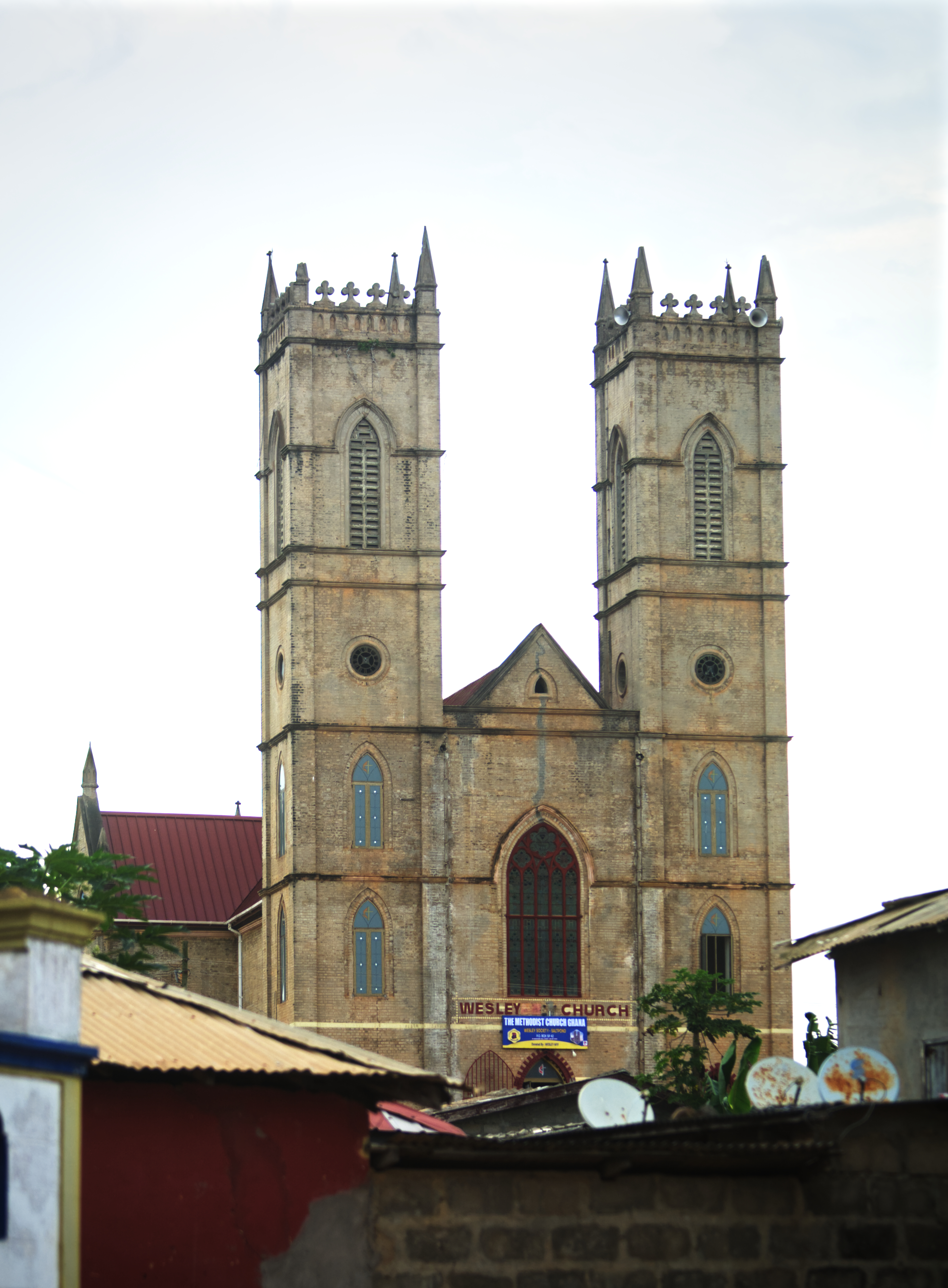
methodist church

== See also ==
- Ayerye Festival
