= Dabasun Nor, Inner Mongolia =

Former salt lake in Inner Mongolia

Coordinates: 36°58′N 95°07′E

Dabasun Nor

Mongolian name
- Mongolian script: ᠳᠠᠪᠤᠰᠤᠨ ᠨᠠᠭᠤᠷ
Transcriptions
- SASM/GNC: Dabusun Naɣur

Dayan Haizi
- Traditional Chinese: 大鹽海子
- Simplified Chinese: 大盐海子
- Postal: Charamannai Nor
- Literal meaning: Great Salt Lake
Transcriptions
Standard Mandarin
- Hanyu Pinyin: Dàyán Hǎizi
- Wade–Giles: Ta-yen Hai-tzu

Dalay Dabasun

Mongolian name
- Mongolian script: ᠳᠠᠯᠠᠢ ᠳᠠᠪᠤᠰᠤᠨ
Transcriptions
- SASM/GNC: Dalai Dabusun

Dabasun Nor was a former salt lake in the northwest corner of the Ordos Loop in what is now the Hanggin Banner of Ordos Prefecture, Inner Mongolia, China.

== Names ==
Dabasun Nor is a romanization of the lake's Mongolian name, which means simply "Salt Lake". The same name also appears as Da-ba-sun Nor, Dabasun-Nor, Dabsoun Nor, and Dabsoun-Noor. The name was calqued into Chinese as 大鹽海子 (Dàyán Hǎizi), "the Great Salt Lake".

It was also known to foreign geographers as Charamannai Nor, Kara-Mannaï-Omo, Karamanni Omo, Hara Manlay Nuur, and Dalay Dabasun, the last meaning "Sea" or "Ocean of Salt", although these names were unknown to locals by the 20th century.

== Geography ==
In the 1840s, the lake was reckoned as about 20 lis (about 13 km or 8.1 mi) in circumference. As late as the mid-1950s, Dabasun Nor was reckoned as usually 13 km (8 mi) long and 2.4–3.2 km (1.5–2 mi) wide, with an expansive salt marsh to its east. After a rain, its depth could reach as much as 1.8 m (6 ft). Its former bed lies about 1,300 m (4,300 ft) above sea level.

The area surrounding the lake was once so saturated with salt and natron as to glow white and was scattered with thorn-covered yardangs. The aridity and salinity precluded almost any trees from growing.

== History ==
Przhevalsky recorded the local tradition that the burial place of Genghis Khan was found by traveling about 200 km (120 mi) south of Dabasun Nor.

In the 1840s, Huc and Gabet followed a caravan route south of the lake. The few freshwater springs that occurred were marked at the time by long poles, each topped with a small flag. Their journey came just a decade after Tao Zhu's liberalization of the imperial salt monopoly, and Huc reported that the lake's salt trade had become so extensive as to supply several nearby provinces. This made the area economically important for trade and popular as a destination along caravan routes, but did little to help locals for whom the salt was nearly worthless. The salinity of the ground also kept them from growing any crops or keeping cattle, although camels and sheep were able to thrive on the local thorny vegetation. Wild lizards, deer, and rabbits were also abundant into the 20th century.

The lake was still exporting large quantities of salt into the 1930s, but by the early 20th century the revenue was being kept by the local Mongol lord at Hanggin and its reduced economic importance meant that most trade followed the Yellow River around the curve of the Ordos, only bothering with crossing directly across the desert when summer flooding made the river valley impractical.

== See also ==
- Salt in Chinese history
- List of lakes and saltwater lakes of China
