= San Fernando Hill =

Hill and religious site in Trinidad and Tobago

Coordinates: 63.9478°S 58.2964°W

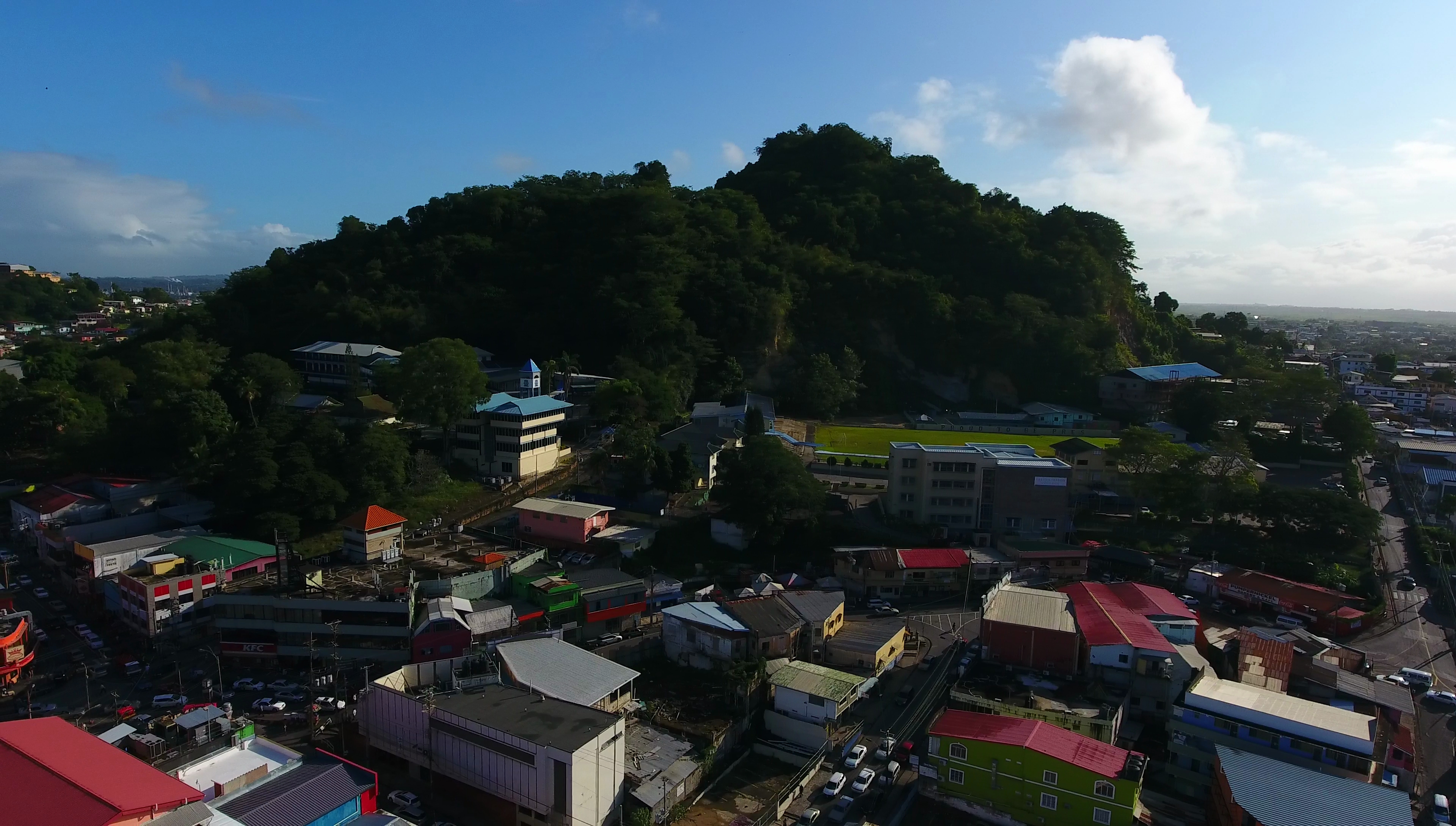
San Fernando Hill, looking east

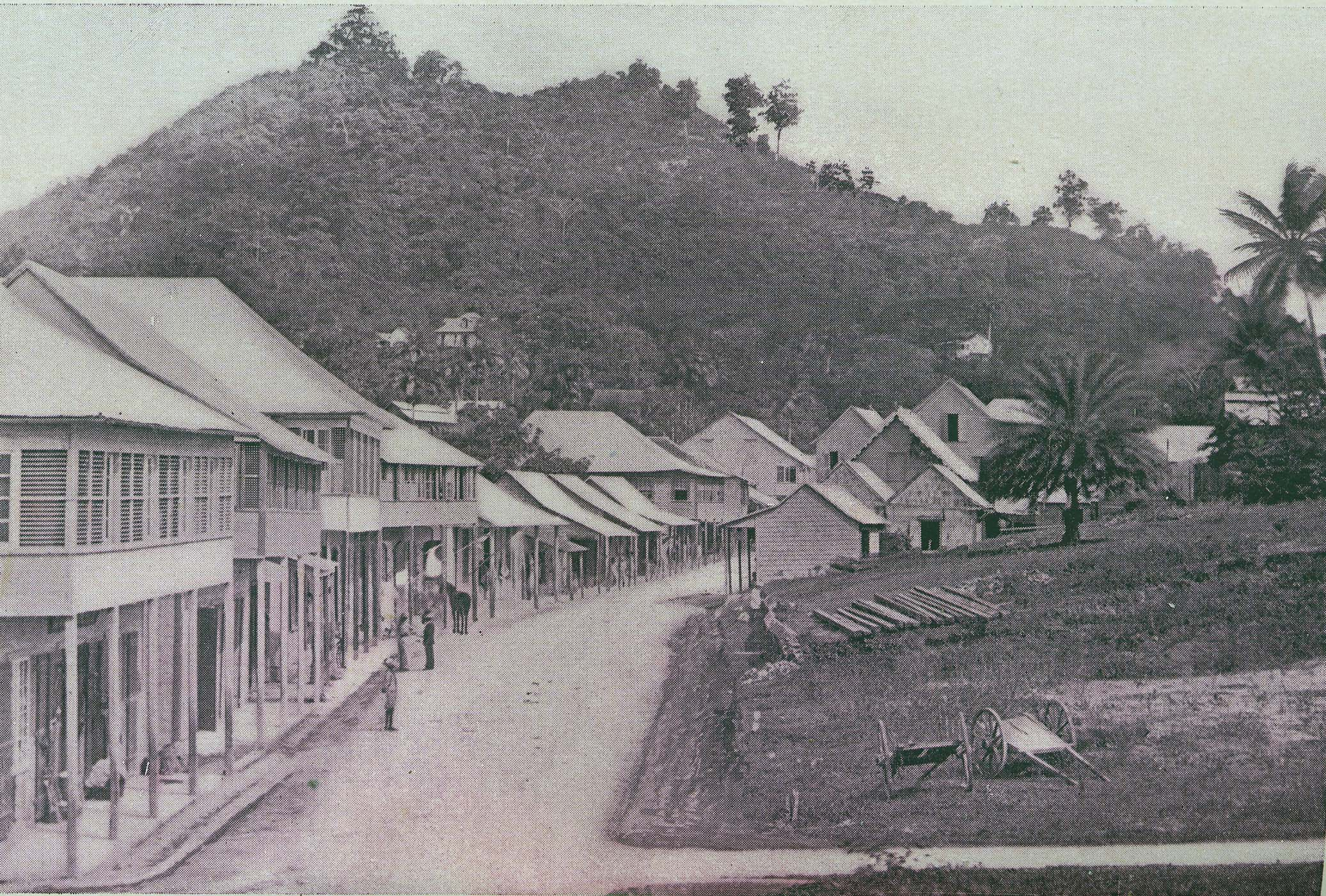
San Fernando Hill prior to quarrying - looking east along High Street in the 1890s

San Fernando Hill (officially known as Naparima Hill, and frequently referred to by the locals as simply The Hill) is a 192-m hill which lies at the centre of the city of San Fernando in Trinidad and Tobago. The hill, an outcrop of Argillite is the highest point in the Naparima Plains. Originally nearly dome-shaped with a flattened top, the size was reduced by more than a third as a result of unrestricted quarrying in the 1970s. The Hill originally supported semi-evergreen forest, but this was largely replaced by cultivated species prior to the devastation of the Hill by quarrying.

Quarrying on the Hill was not a new phenomenon, but the increase in demand for Argillite aggregate (for construction) during the oil boom of the 1970s led to an expansion of quarrying to the point where it appeared that the entire Hill would be removed. Protests by citizens' groups led to a halt to quarrying and the Hill was included in the National Parks and Protected Areas plan of 1980. The Forestry Division of Trinidad and Tobago Forestry Division took over management of the Hill and have since constructed a visitor centre and recreation area on the Hill. When visiting the centre, one can look out over a commanding view of south and central Trinidad, the Gulf Of Paria, and on a clear day, the coast of nearby Venezuela. Several World War II-era bunkers also exist on the Hill, but they are not readily accessible to the public.

During the late 1980s the then mayor of San Fernando, Dr. Romesh Mootoo suggested that the City Hall be removed to the Hill, calling it the Acropolis of the Caribbean. Nothing came of these plans, however. With the development of the Hill as a recreation area, the burgess of San Fernando and surrounding have re-connected with the Hill. During the Christmas season, a large star, lit electrically, can be seen all over the surrounding area, from its place on the San Fernando Hill.

Based on the Masters research of Tyrone Kalpee, (now of BP), an innovative plan for the restoration of the bare-rock surface of the formerly quarried areas (which make up about 3/4 of the Hill) was developed based on Leucaena leucocephala, a fast-growing leguminous tree species. The Forestry Division incorporated Kalpee's plans into its restoration plan for the Hill, and as a result many areas support relatively lush vegetation.
