= USS Salt Lake City =

Two ships of the United States Navy have borne the name USS Salt Lake City, in honor of the city in Utah which has served successively as the capital of the Provisional State of Deseret, the Utah Territory, and the 45th state. See Salt Lake City, Utah.

- The first USS Salt Lake City (CA-25) was a Pensacola-class treaty cruiser, a heavy cruiser commissioned in 1929, and saw much action in World War II before being used in atomic bomb tests in 1946.
- The second USS Salt Lake City (SSN-716) was a Los Angeles-class attack submarine, decommissioned in November 2006 at Portsmouth Naval Shipyard.

== See also ==
- Salt Lake City (disambiguation)
