= Salt Lake (New Zealand) =

Lake in Northland, New Zealand

Salt Lake, New Zealand
- Location within Northland Region
- Location: Northland Region, North Island
- Coordinates: 34.705866°S 173.024892°E
- Basin countries: New Zealand

Salt Lake is a lake in the north part of New Zealand's Northland Region, just off the 1F Far North Road.

== See also ==
- List of lakes in New Zealand
