= Saltpond Oil Field =

Oil field in Ghana

- Location within Ghana
- Country: Ghana
- Region: Central region
- Location: Takoradi Arch
- Offshore/onshore: Offshore
- Coordinates: 5.093°N 1.069°W
- Operators: Saltpond Offshore Producing Company
- Partners: Lushann-Eternit Energy Ltd. (55%); GNPC (45%)

Field history
- Discovery: 1970
- Start of production: October 1978

Production
- Current production of oil: 550 barrels per day (~27,000 t/a)
- Peak of production (oil): 4,800 barrels per day (~2.4×10^{5} t/a)
- Estimated oil in place: 1.2 million barrels (~1.6×10^{5} t)
- Estimated gas in place: 20,000×10^{9} cu ft (570×10^{9} m^{3})
- Producing formations: Devonian Takoradi Formation

Saltpond Oil Field is an oil field off the coast of Ghana. The field was discovered in 1970 by Signal-Amoco Consortium. The field is currently managed by the Saltpond Offshore Producing Company (SOPCL), Ghana's oldest producer of crude oil.

== Location ==
The oil field is located 65 miles (105 km) west of Ghana's capital, Accra, in the Central region of Ghana. It is located about 13 kilometres (8.1 mi) off the coast of Saltpond in the northern-central area of the Takoradi Arch, in water depth of 80 feet (24 m). It extends over an area of 5 square kilometres (1.9 sq mi).

== History ==
=== Original development ===
Saltpond Oil Field was discovered in 1970 after the Ghana National Petroleum Corporation (GNPC) licensed Signal-Amoco Consortium to operate in Ghana's territorial waters. The initial appraisal of the field showed that the well would produce 3,600 barrels per day (570 m^{3}/d) of oil.

In 1976 Amoco relinquished the concession, citing the field as non-commercial. The concession was reassigned to Offshore Hydrocarbons Ltd., which later entered into a development farmout with Agri-Petco of the United States. In 1977–1978 Agri-Petco drilled six appraisal wells from a centrally located jackup rig called Mr. Louie. After the drilling, the jack-up was converted into a production unit and the field was put onstream in October 1978.

In 1984, the field was reassigned to Primary Fuels Inc., which took over the operation for a year. In July 1985 GNPC took over the operation of the field.

From 1978 to 1985 the maximum oil production was 4,800 barrels per day (760 m^{3}/d) of oil. When operation stopped in 1985, the volume of production was 580 barrels per day (92 m^{3}/d). The estimated percentages of oil and gas that had been obtained from the field at the time of shutdown were 10.4% and 25%, respectively, with three of the six wells unable to produce oil.

=== Operation resumption ===
On 18 January 2000, GNPC entered into an agreement with Lushann International of Houston, Texas, for the rehabilitation of the Saltpond Oil Field and the implementation of the rig-less workover proposal. Lushann International contracted Eternit Universal Ltd. of Nigeria for the financing of the rehabilitation works. In August 2000, rehabilitation works commenced with the repair of the Mr. Louie platform. In 2002, Oildata's programme of rig-less workover discovered obstructions in the wells which prevented workers from reaching the bottom of most of the wells. When the workover was completed, only two wells were able to produce between 480–600 barrels per day (76–95 m^{3}/d) of oil. Lushann International was also granted the right to develop up to 400 MW of power generation facilities to commercialize natural gas from the Saltpond Field.

In 2002, the Government of Ghana began re-negotiating the agreement between GNPC and Lushann-Eternit Energy Ltd. The negotiations ended in 2004 with a new agreement in which GNPC's stake was increased from 40% to 45%, with Lushann-Eternit Energy Ltd. having 55%. The new agreement led to the creation of the Saltpond Offshore Producing Company, which markets the oil from the fields on the world market.

The rig-less workover could not sustain high production, resulting in a drop of about 450 barrels per day (72 m^{3}/d). In 2005, operations were suspended so the rig-less workover could be replaced. Operations resumed in April 2006 with an increase in production to 700 barrels per day (110 m^{3}/d) from two wells.

In 2008, the diesel-fired generating plant was replaced by a natural gas-fired plant for utilization of natural gas from the field. This reduced production cost on the fields. A new storage vessel, MT Bonsu, was purchased for storage of oil from the field. It replaced the previously leased storage vessel MT African Wave, which had become dangerous to operate. By other sources, the reason for termination of the leasing contract was the inability of SOPCL to pay its outstanding bills.

On 10 June 2010, GNPC announced that it pulls out of the Saltpond Offshore Producing Company.

== Reserves and production ==
The estimated initially resource in place was 34.4 million barrels (5.47×10^{6} m^{3}) of oil, 34.3 billion cubic feet (970×10^{6} m^{3}) of gas condensate, and 21.9 billion cubic feet (620×10^{6} m^{3}) of natural gas. After the field's operations were shut down in 1985, GNPC commissioned various geological and engineering studies to improve its knowledge of the nature of the field and to ascertain if long-term redevelopment was feasible. In 1986, Braspetro conducted a study in which an estimated 1.2 million barrels (190×10^{3} m^{3}) and 20 billion cubic feet (570×10^{6} m^{3}) of natural gas was reported still in the field. Another study by Oil-data Wireline Services of Nigeria in 1999 recommended a rig-less workover for the redevelopment of the field.

The cumulative production from beginning of operations to the shut-in in 1985 was 3.752 million barrels (596.5×10^{3} m^{3}) of oil and 14.086 billion cubic feet (398.9×10^{6} m^{3}) of natural gas. The field currently produces about 550 barrels per day (87 m^{3}/d) of oil.

== Incidents ==
In April 2003, the storage vessel MT Asterias, operating at the Saltpond Oil Field, was alleged to have gone missing with 73,701 barrels (11,717.5 m^{3}) of oil. It was seized by its owner, the Nigerian company Ocean & Oil Limited, due to non-payment of freight charges by Lushann International. According to authorities of Ghana, Lushann International was not paid any royalties, carried interests, training allowances and annual surface rentals which were mandatory under the petroleum laws of Ghana.
