= Chaguaramas, Trinidad and Tobago =

Chaguaramas
- Town
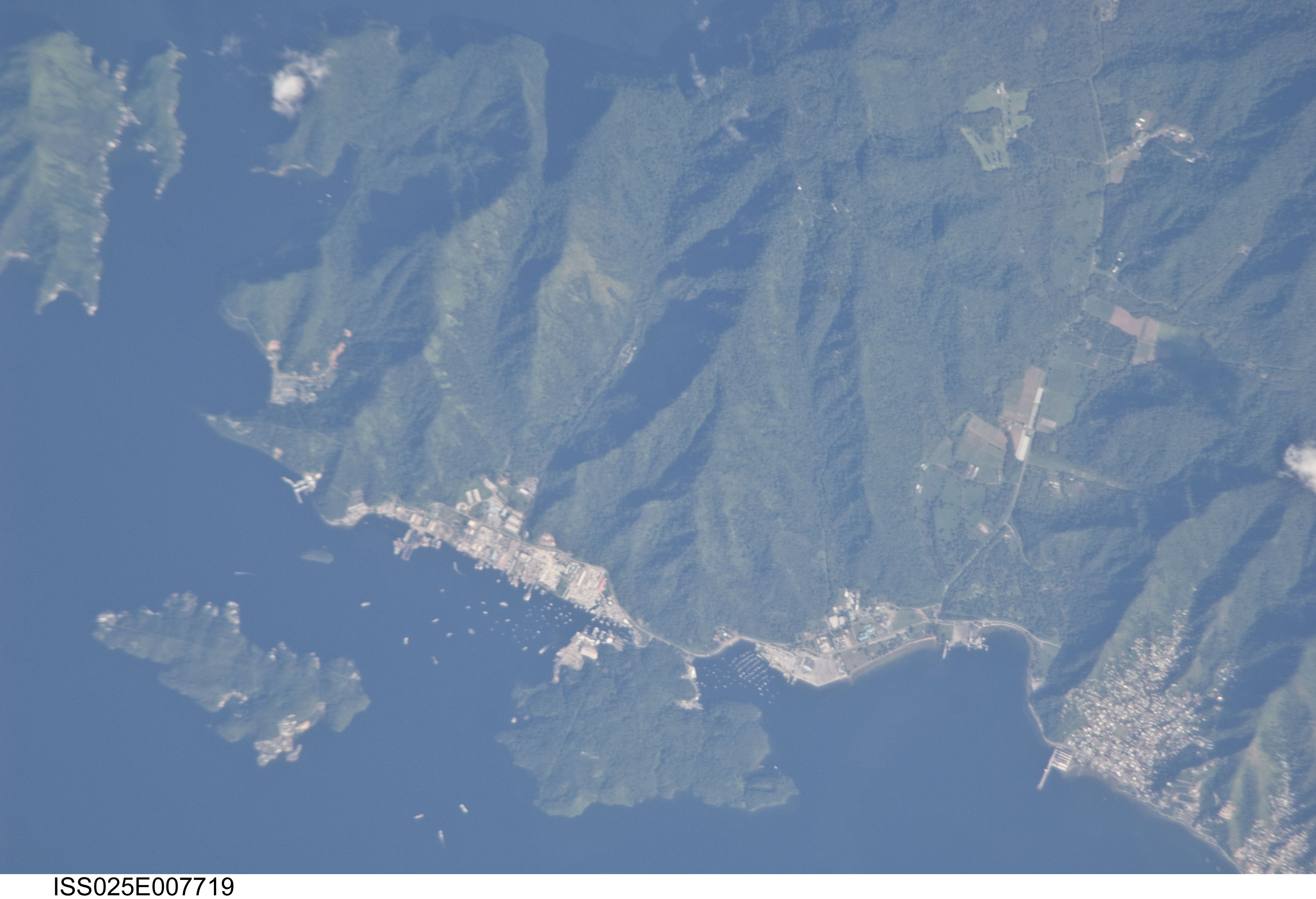
- Chaguaramas seen from space

- Location in Trinidad and Tobago
- Coordinates: 10°41′N 61°38′W
- Country: Trinidad and Tobago
- Corporation: Diego Martin Regional Corporation
- Time zone: UTC−4 (AST)
- Area code: +1 (868) 634

Chaguaramas (/ˌʃɑːɡəˈrɑːməs/, lies in the Northwest Peninsula of Trinidad west of Port of Spain; the name is often applied to the entire peninsula, but is sometimes used to refer to its most developed area. The developed area in Chaguaramas starts at an Alcoa aluminum manufacturing plant and dock, and ends at the Army and Coast Guard camps on the mainland. Offshore, a group known as The Five Islands are in various stages of development or redevelopment, as of 2016.

Most of the roadway in Chaguaramas lies close to the coastline and one can view the sea from the winding road. It is about 14 km from Port of Spain.

== Leasing of Chaguaramas to the United States ==
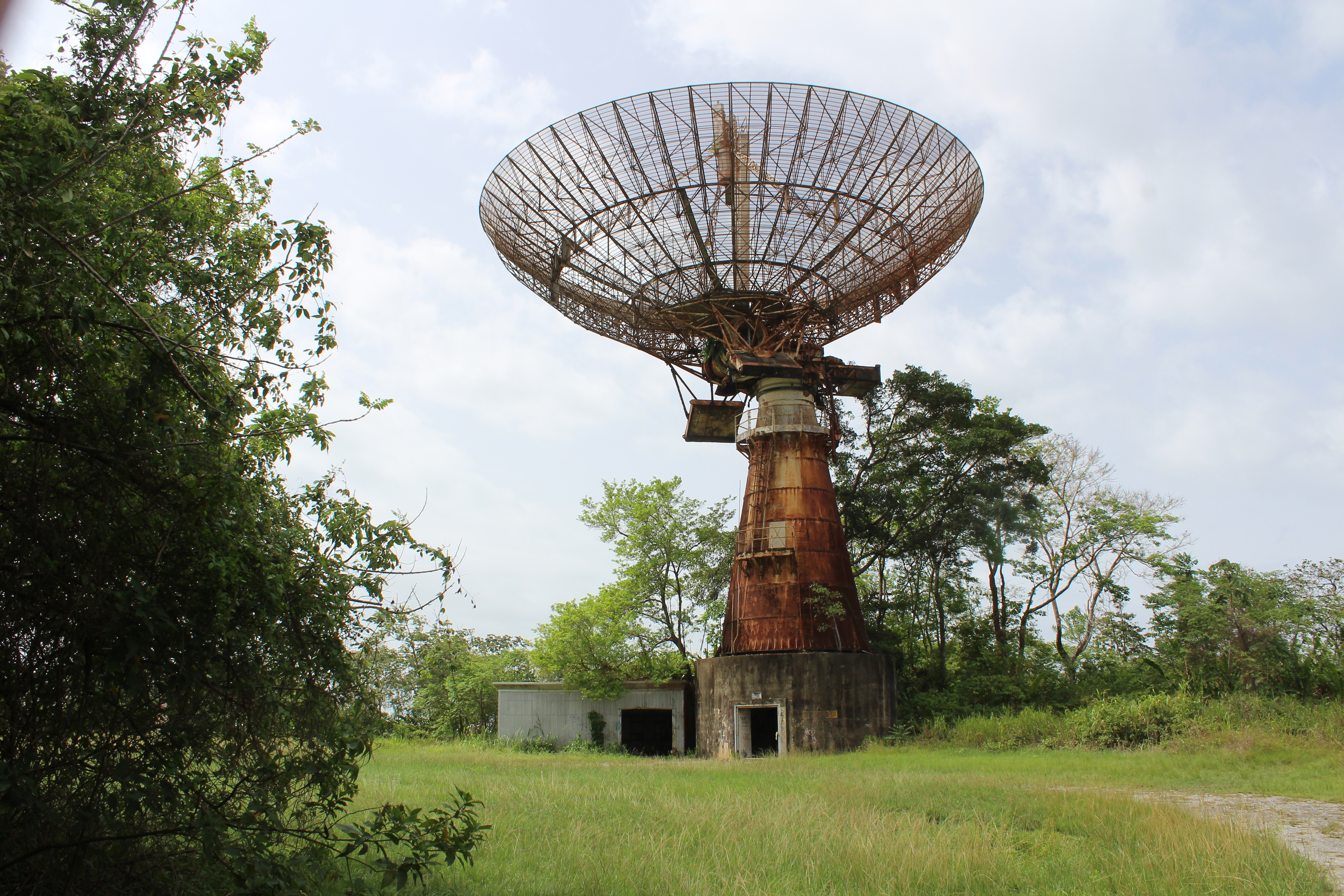
U.S. Air Force Eastern Test Range

The entire peninsula was leased to the United States in 1940 for the construction of a naval base, Naval Base Trinidad, under the Destroyers for Bases Agreement.

The base was also used during the early 1960s as a BMEWS early warning radar site, as well as a missile tracking site on the U.S. Air Force Eastern Test Range. The base was scaled back in 1956 and the area was returned to Trinidad and Tobago control in 1963.

== West Indies Federation,Treaty of Chaguaramas, and CARICOM ==
Chaguaramas was the location slated for the construction of the capital of the short-lived West Indies Federation. It is also the place where the Treaty of Chaguaramas was signed, establishing CARICOM, the Caribbean Community and Common Market, in 1973.

== Activities and places of interest ==
=== Dry forests ===
The Chaguaramas Peninsula supports one of the few remaining areas of dry forest in western Trinidad.

=== Cycling and kayaking ===
On weekends groups of persons enter Chaguaramas to cycle on or kayak in rented equipment. During the week, the roadway is used as a training ground for persons who cycle in groups either for sport or as a part of a training session for a triathalon. Mountain biking has grown in popularity and an extensive trail network has been developed in Tucker Valley. These trails are created and maintained by the local Mountain Bike community.

=== Boardwalk area ===
The Chaguaramas Boardwalk was developed by the Chaguaramas Development Authority (CDA) as part of its tourism developmental thrust. The Boardwalk stretches for approximately 1300 feet along the shore of one of the Bays. The Boardwalk can be used as an exercise route for pedestrians or for young families who stroll or as a stepping stone to get to the water to swim for leisure or as part of a training regimen.

Available in close proximity to the Boardwalk are Gazebos and Pedal Boats which are available for rent. There is also the Dancing Water Fountain, the Trees Vendor Plaza and Miniature Off Road Activities according to the CDA's website.

=== Chaguaramas Golf Course ===
The Chaguaramas Golf Course is "a 9-hole course" and the only "public" golf course in the twin-island Republic. The Golf Course at Chaguaramas has been in existence for over forty years and is one of the older golf courses, if not the oldest in the island.

=== Pier 1 ===
Pier 1 was designed to host functions for large numbers of persons. The venue was designed to host events in small areas within a larger setting, thus it can serve a large number of persons with different tastes through the use of the smaller areas as niche spots.

=== Yachting ===
Chaguaramas has been the center of yachting activity in Trinidad. There are several marinas within the Chaguaramas area which provide repair services or on-land boarding services for yachts. There is also the option to refuel and stock supplies or just moor the yacht at a pier or in a sheltered bay facility and visit the island.

=== Heritage parks, Macqueripe and Edith Falls ===
According to the CDA, the Gasparee Cave on Gasparee Island, along with the Salt Pond on Chacachacare and the Bellerand Heritage Park fall within the boundaries of Chaguaramas. Although Gasparee has been developed with housing facilities, to a large extent efforts have been made to preserve the birds on the island, through the "upkeep" of the large trees which provide shelter at great heights for them.

"Conveniently located just off the Macqueripe Road, Bellerand Heritage Park is surrounded by various areas offering recreational activities such as golfing, swimming and is a 'stone's throw' away from the Magnificent Edith Falls". Another heritage park which is located within the Macqueripe area in Chaguaramas is Samaan Park.

At Macqueripe, one is allowed to swim in the sea as the area is located in an inlet. However great care should be exercised in entering and exiting the water as due to dredging of the seabed many years ago, there is a sharp descent of several feet close to the shore. The drop/ or descent can make the area perilous for newly trained swimmers and the extremely short person entering or exiting the water.

=== Tucker Valley ===
Tucker Valley is known for several points of interest such as: The Bamboo Cathedral, The UPick Farm and Restaurant, The World War Bunker, and The Nutmeg Grove, among other things. The Bamboo Cathedral is well known by photographers who capture images of the wide lane of the roadway with the bamboos intertwining overhead. The UPick Farm "sells a wide range of fruits and vegetables (grown off-site) both local and imported". Also available at the UPick Farm are guided tours and field trips for primary and secondary school children.

=== Dockside facilities ===
The Chaguaramas area also contains some dockside facilities, mostly for the transfer of bauxite ore between ship and shore, or from smaller boats to ocean-going vessels. The function of such docks is easily recognizable as the docks and buildings are colored pink from the bauxite dust.

=== Hunting and fishing ===
After the Trinidad and Tobago government passed the Conservation and Wildlife Act in 1960, hunting is strictly prohibited. This law is upheld by the Chaguaramas Development Authority. Chaguaramas is however one of the country's most popular spots for tarpon fishing. In 2010, Sportsfishing Magazine named Chaguaramas waters one of their top locations for fishing tarpon.

== Gallery ==
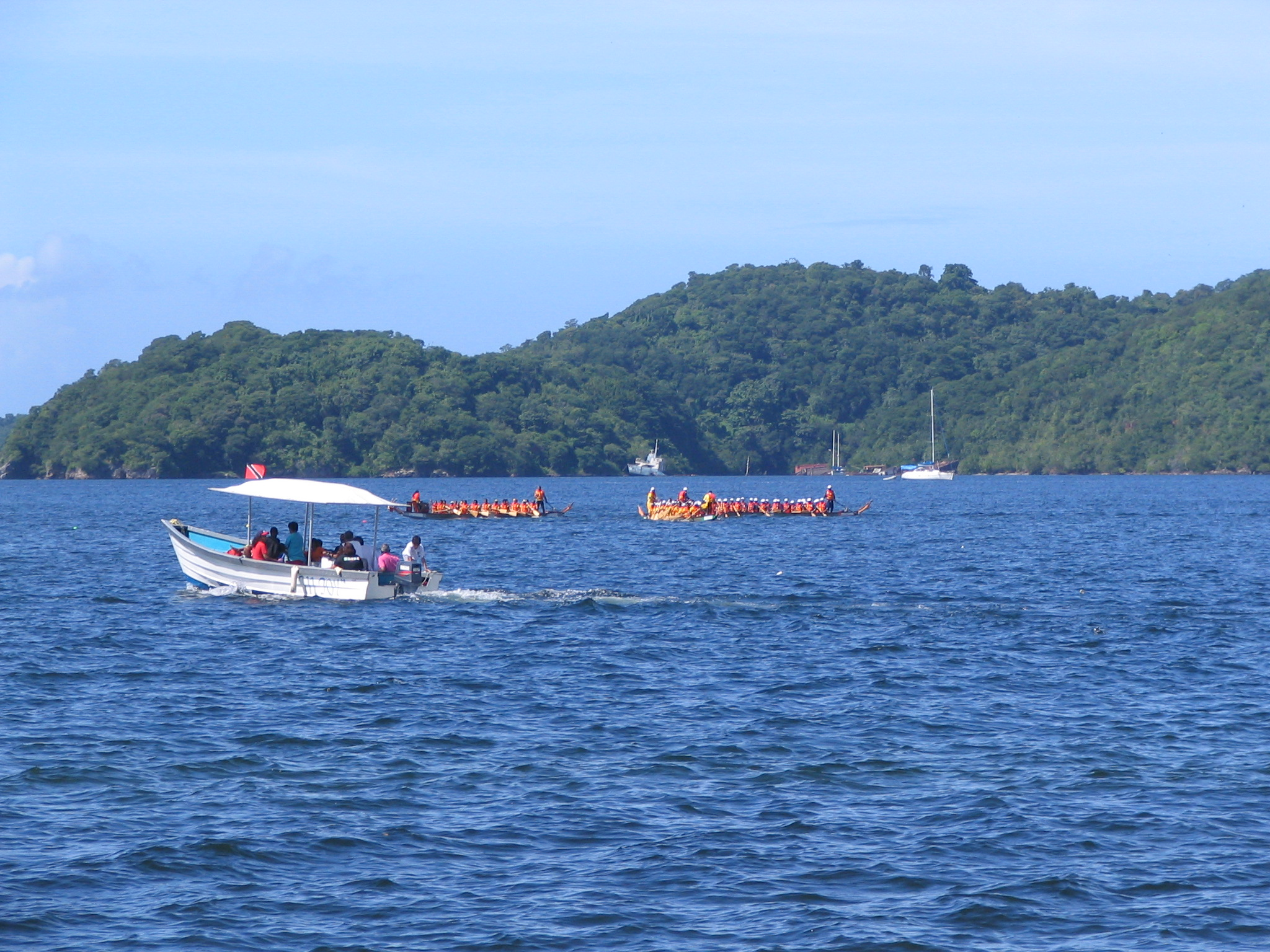
Looking West across Williams Bay during Dragon Boat racing in Chaguaramas, Trinidad and Tobago

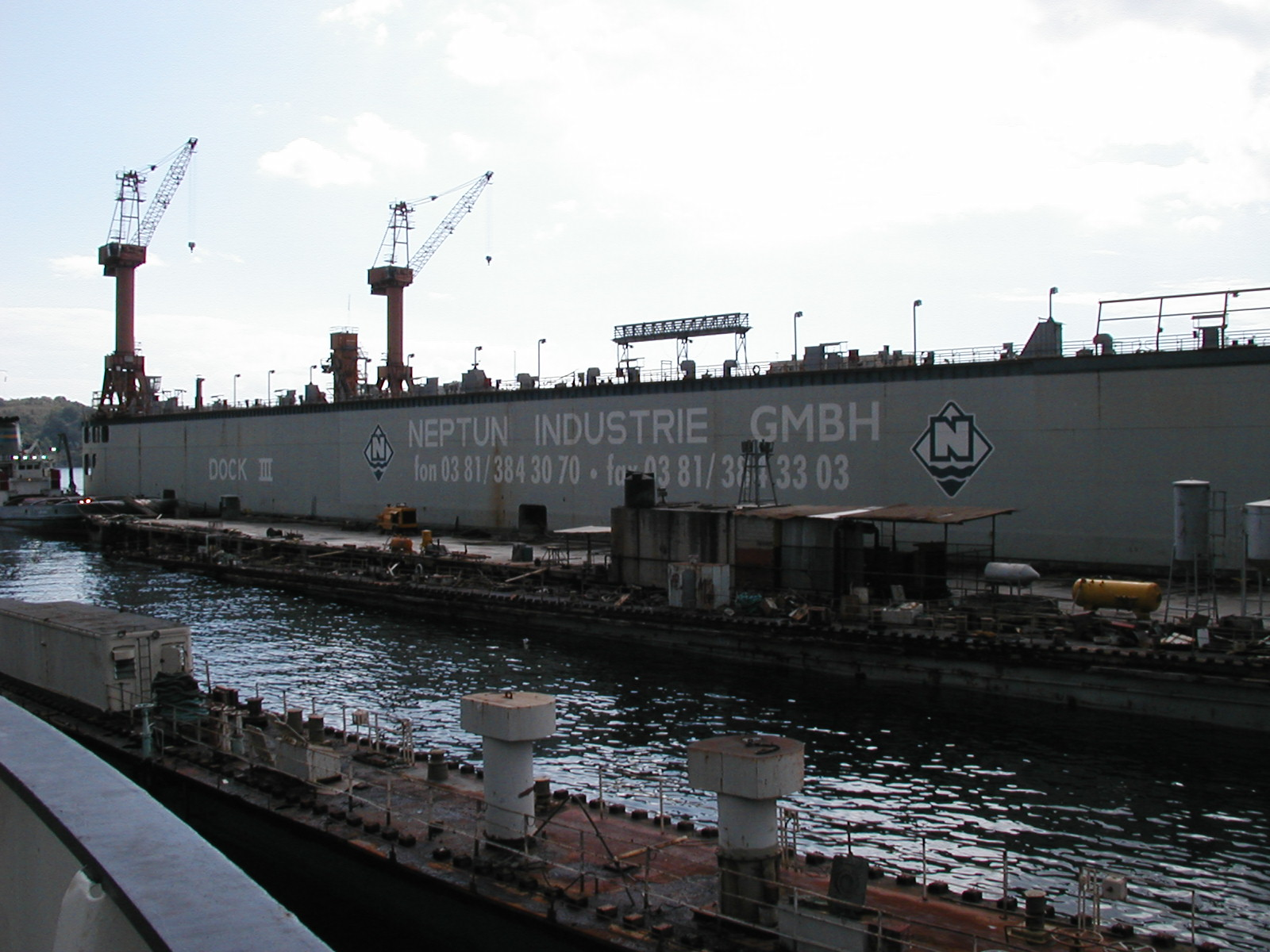
A Drydock in Chaguaramas

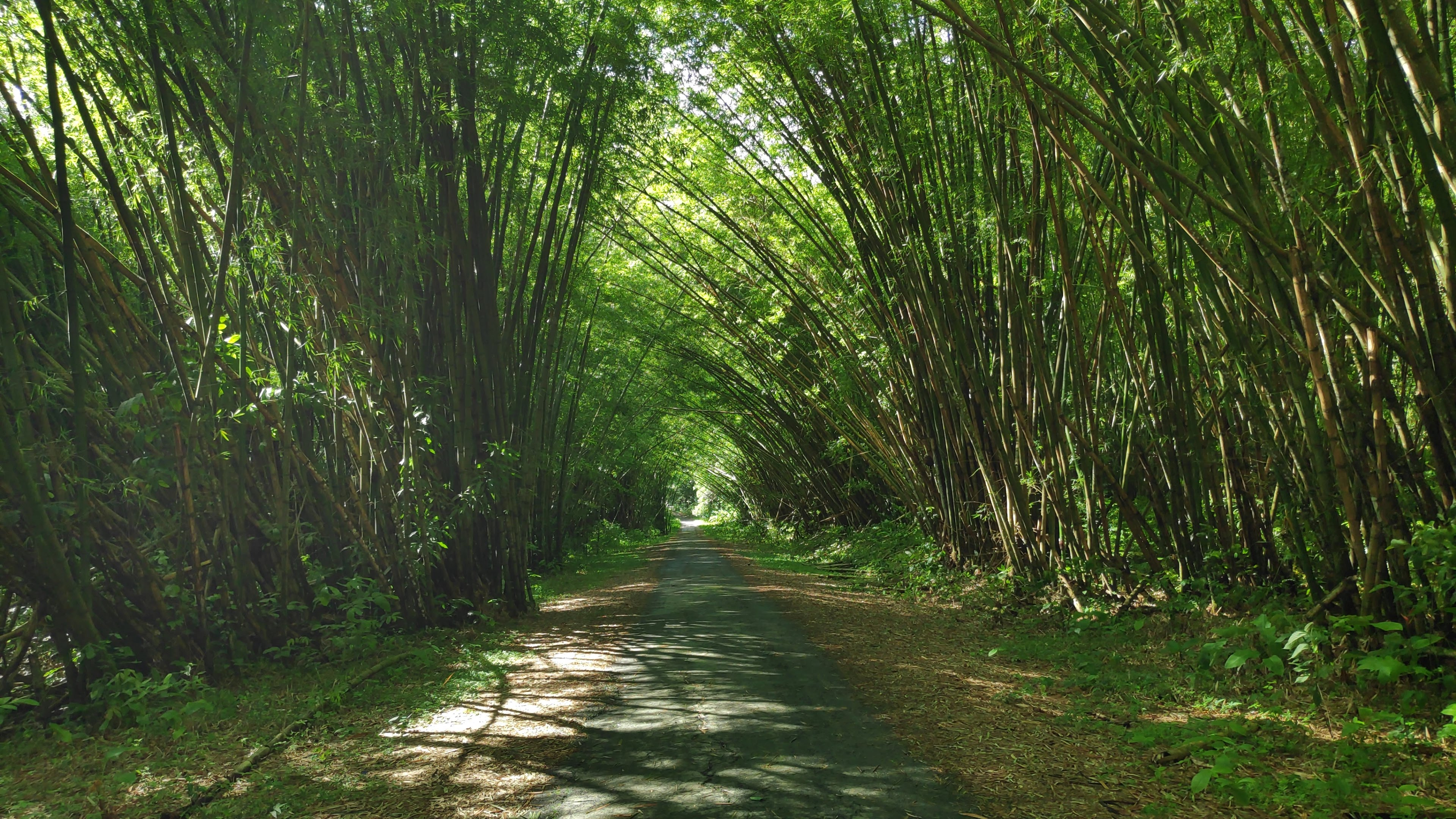
The "Bamboo Cathedral" on the road to the Tracking Station in Chaguaramas

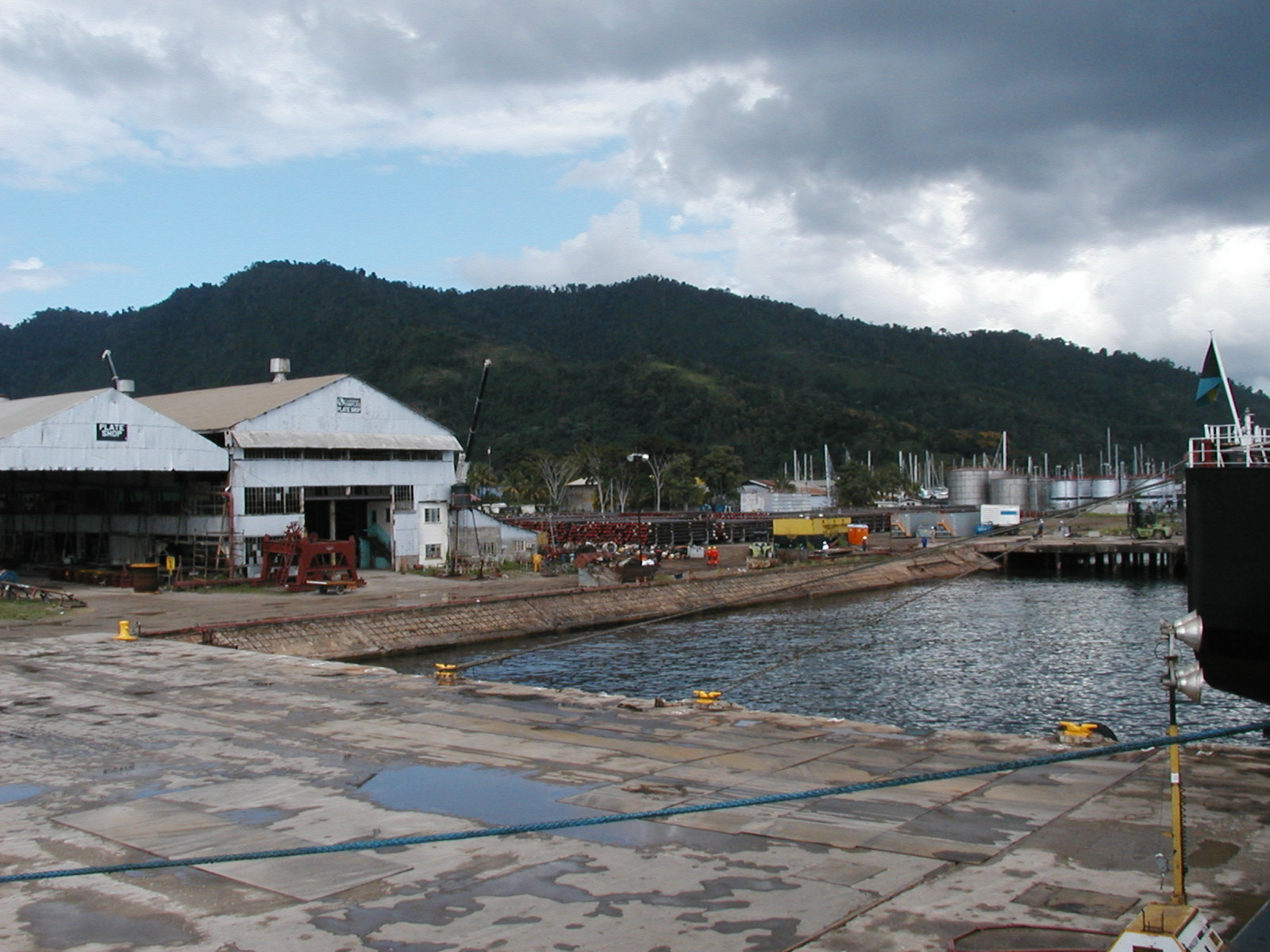
A warehouse harbour in Chaguaramas

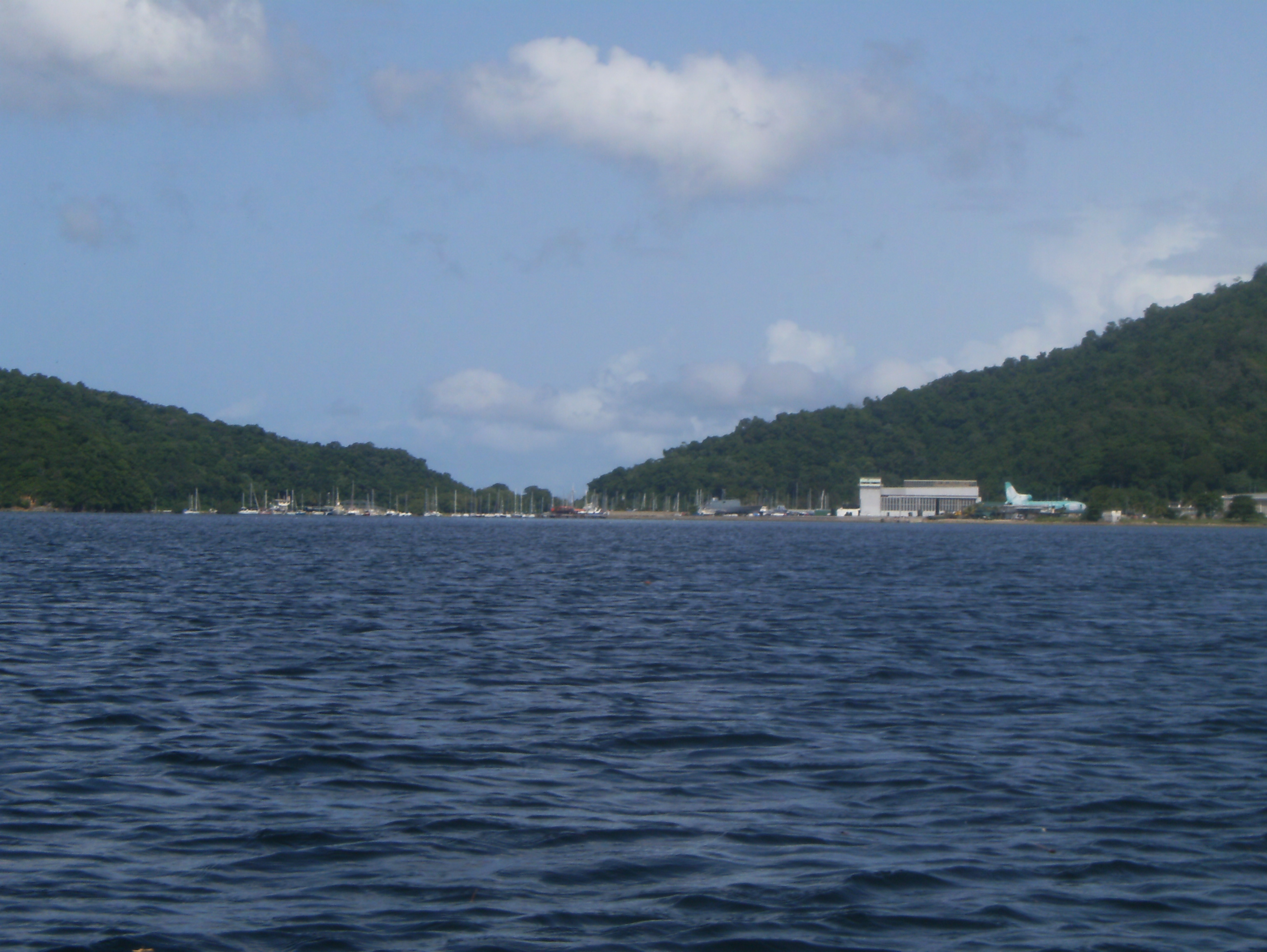
Hart's Cut Bay in Chaguaramas
