= RBI Thiruvananthapuram =

Seal of the Reserve Bank of India

RBI Thiruvananthapuram is a branch office of the Reserve Bank of India, with its jurisdiction covering the State of Kerala and the Union Territory of Lakshadweep. This regional office contains nearly all of the major departments of Reserve Bank of India. The only exceptions are the departments of Foreign Exchange (FED) and Economic Policy & Research (DEPR), both of which are housed at the bank's sub-office at Kochi. The office is headed by Praveen Kumar Vasantha Ramachandran, regional director.

== History ==
RBI Thiruvananthapuram started operating on 2 January 1954, from a rented building with just one department, viz. Department of Banking Operations (DBO). In 1960 the Agricultural Credit Department (ACD) started operating in another location of the city. In 1968 both of the departments were shifted to the Belhaven Palace building in Kowdiar. This building was purchased from the royal family of the erstwhile State of Travancore. In 1981 the Sub-office of Issue Department started operating from the building of the Union Bank of India. In 1982 the office shifted to its current location at Bakery Junction, Thiruvananthapuram.

The office of the Banking Ombudsman for the State of Kerala and UT of Lakshadweep is also situated at RBI Thiruvananthapuram. It has been operating since 1997.

== Departments and functions ==
The Issue Department of RBI Thiruvananthapuram looks after the currency requirement of 229 currency chests and 226 small coin depots in the state of Kerala and UT of Lakshadweep. The Urban Banks Department (UBD) supervises 60 Urban Cooperative Banks. The Rural Planning and Credit Department (RPCD) has jurisdiction over more than 1,600 Primary Agricultural Credit Societies, besides two Regional Rural Banks and 14 central cooperative banks, and the Department of Banking Supervision (DBS) conducts the supervision and monitoring of approximately 2500 branches of public sector banks and more than 1400 branches of private sector banks, besides five foreign bank branches.

== Achievements ==
RBI Thiruvananthapuram was instrumental in ensuring 100 per cent Meaningful Financial Inclusion in the Ernakulam district of Kerala.

== People ==
Shri G. Padmanabhan of the office, who became executive director of RBI in 2011, and the non-executive chairman of Bank of India in 2015 was also gold medalist of University of Kerala. Salim Gangadharan, director of South Indian Bank, became the first-ever principal chief general manager of the office in 2013.

The hockey player and sports administrator Ramesh Kolappa is an employee of RBI Thiruvananthapuram. Ramesh Kolappa was the manager of the Indian National Hockey Team which won the Asian Hockey Champions Trophy at Ordos in China in 2012. The poet Gopi Kottoor, whose real name is R. G. Nair, is a deputy general manager at RBI Thiruvananthapuram. The poet Tapan Kumar Pradhan is also an employee of this office.
