= Ordos railway station =

Railway station in Ordos City, China

Ordos 鄂尔多斯站
- ᠣᠷᠳᠣᠰ ᠥᠷᠲᠡᠭᠡ

General information
- Location: Altan Xire, Ejin Horo Banner, Ordos City, Inner Mongolia; China
- Coordinates: 39.559751°N 109.837159°E
- Operated by: China Railway Hohhot Group
- Line(s): Baoxi Railway

History
- Opened: May 2016

Ordos railway station (Chinese: 鄂尔多斯站) is a railway station of the Baotou–Xi'an railway, and is the terminus of the Hohhot–Jungar–Ordos railway. It opened in May 2016.

The station is located around 8 km from the urban core of the city, and 10 km from Ordos Ejin Horo Airport. As of 2020, the station currently receives 15 daily services.

In 2021, the first Fuxing service to Xi'an was introduced, shortening the journey time between the two cities.
