= Erdos Bronzeware Museum =

Museum in Inner Mongolia, China

- Established: May 2006
- Location: No.2, Xingsheng Road, Dongsheng District, Dongsheng District

The Erdos Bronzeware Museum (simplified Chinese: 鄂尔多斯青铜器博物馆; traditional Chinese: 鄂爾多斯青銅器博物館), also known as Ordos Bronze Museum, is a thematic museum integrating collection, display and research of "Erdos Bronzewares" (鄂尔多斯青铜器), located in the downtown center of Dongsheng District, Ordos City, Inner Mongolia.

Erdos Bronzeware Museum was opened in May 2006, with an exhibition hall area of more than 7000 square meters, and

Erdos Bronzeware Museum is the first museum in China dedicated to displaying the bronzes of ancient northern grassland nomads. It is a second-class national museum in China.
