= Ordos Sports Center Stadium =

Sports complex in Inner Mongolia, China

- Address: Kangbashi District; Ordos City, Inner Mongolia; China
- Capacity: 60,000

Construction
- Opened: 2015
- Construction cost: 7 billion CNY

The Ordos Sports Center is a sports complex with a multi-purpose stadium in Ordos, China. The complex features the 60,000-seat main stadium known as the Ordos Sports Center Stadium that's currently mostly used for football matches as well as an indoor arena with a capacity of 12,000. Construction of Ordos Sports Center launched on the 15/03/2012 and was completed by June 2015 just in time for the 10th National Traditional Games Of Ethnic Minorities that were held in Ordos.
