= Banking Ombudsman =

Banking Ombudsman may refer to:

- Banking Ombudsman Scheme (India)
- Financial Ombudsman Service (United Kingdom)
- Financial Ombudsman Service (Australia)
