= Uxin Banner =

Uxin Banner 乌审旗 • ᠦᠦᠰᠢᠨ ᠬᠣᠰᠢᠭᠤ Wushen
- Banner
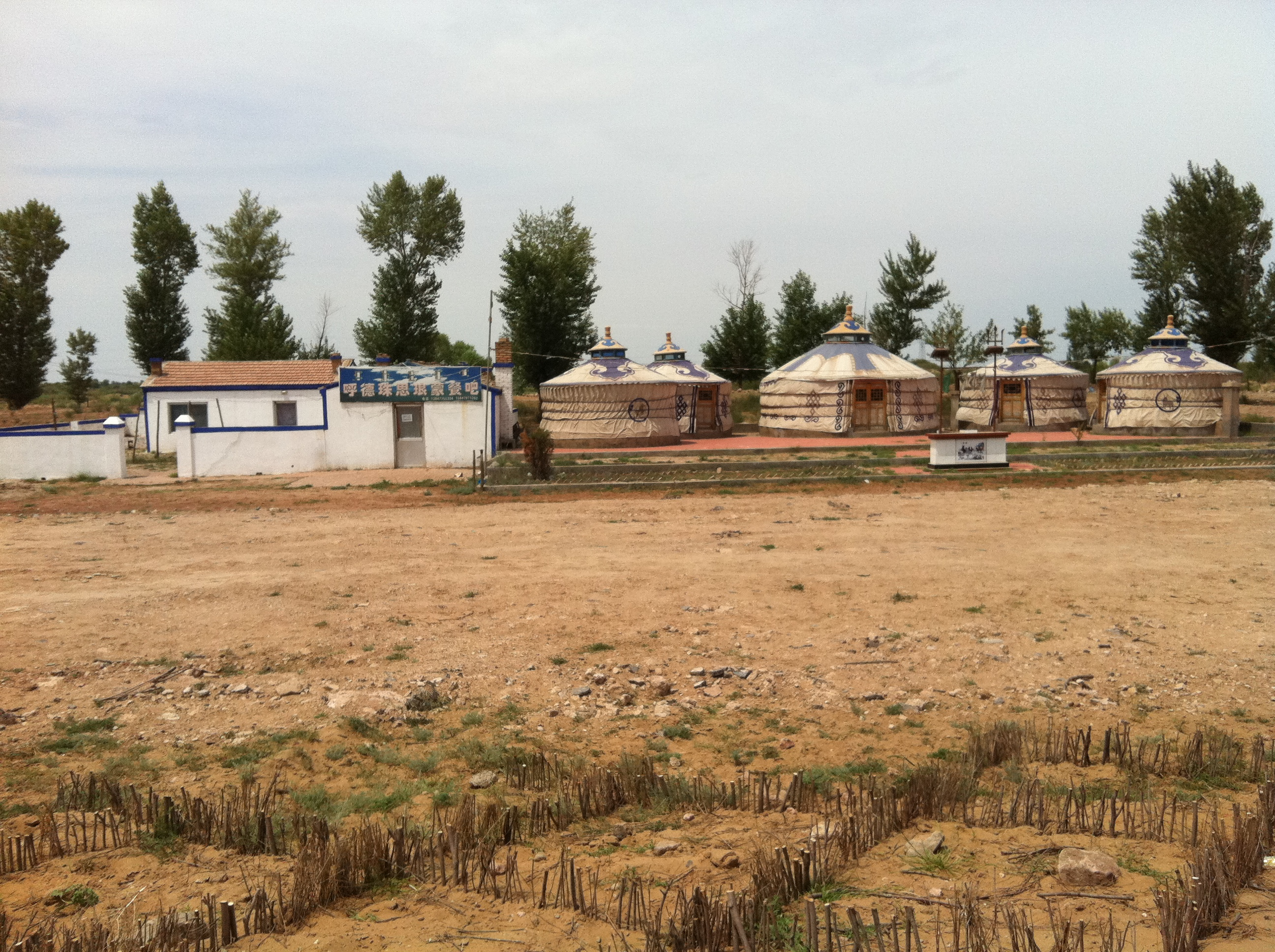

- Location in Inner Mongolia Uxin (China)
- Coordinates: 38°35′N 108°51′E
- Country: China
- Autonomous region: Inner Mongolia
- Prefecture-level city: Ordos
- Banner seat: Galut

Area
  - Total: 11,650 km^{2} (4,500 sq mi)
- Elevation: 1,299 m (4,262 ft)

Population (2020)
  - Total: 158,566
  - Density: 13.61/km^{2} (35.25/sq mi)
- Time zone: UTC+8 (China Standard)
- Website: www.wsq.gov.cn

Uxin Banner

Chinese name
- Simplified Chinese: 乌审旗
- Traditional Chinese: 烏審旗
Transcriptions
Standard Mandarin
- Hanyu Pinyin: Wūshěn Qí

Mongolian name
- Mongolian Cyrillic: Үүшин Хошуу
- Mongolian script: ᠦᠦᠰᠢᠨ ᠬᠣᠰᠢᠭᠤ
Transcriptions
- SASM/GNC: Üüsin qosiɣu

Uxin Banner (also Wushen; Mongolian: ᠦᠦᠰᠢᠨ ᠬᠣᠰᠢᠭᠤ Üüsin qosiɣu; Chinese: 乌审旗) is a banner in the southwest of Inner Mongolia, China, bounded to the south by Shaanxi province. It borders the banners of Ejin Horo to the northeast, Hanggin to the north, Otog to the northwest, and Otog Front to the southwest. It is under the administration of Ordos City.

== Administrative divisions ==
Uxin Banner is made up of 5 towns and 1 sum.

Name	Simplified Chinese	Hanyu Pinyin	Mongolian (Hudum Script)	Mongolian (Cyrillic)	Administrative division code
Towns
Galut Town	嘎鲁图镇	Gālǔtú Zhèn	ᠭᠠᠯᠠᠭᠤᠲᠤ ᠪᠠᠯᠭᠠᠰᠤ	Галуут балгас	150626100
Uxin Ju Town	乌审召镇	Wūshěnzhào Zhèn	ᠦᠦᠰᠢᠨᠵᠤᠤ ᠪᠠᠯᠭᠠᠰᠤ	Үүшинжүү балгас	150626101
Tug Town	图克镇	Túkè Zhèn	ᠲᠤᠭ ᠪᠠᠯᠭᠠᠰᠤ	Дог балгас	150626102
Ulan Tolgoi Town	乌兰陶勒盖镇	Wūlántáolègài Zhèn	ᠤᠯᠠᠭᠠᠨᠲᠣᠯᠣᠭᠠᠢ ᠪᠠᠯᠭᠠᠰᠤ	Улаантолгой балгас	150626103
Wudinghe Town	无定河镇	Wúdìnghé Zhèn	ᠰᠢᠷᠠᠤ᠋ᠰᠤᠨ ᠪᠠᠯᠭᠠᠰᠤ	Шараосон балгас	150626104
Sum
Suld Sum	苏力德苏木	Sūlìdé Sūmù	ᠰᠦᠯᠳᠡ ᠰᠤᠮᠤ	Сүлд сум	150626200

Other: Subrag Economic Development Zone (苏里格经济开发区)

== Climate ==
Climate data for Uxin Banner, elevation 1,307 m (4,288 ft), (1991–2020 normals, extremes 1981–2010)
Month	Jan	Feb	Mar	Apr	May	Jun	Jul	Aug	Sep	Oct	Nov	Dec	Year
Record high °C (°F)	14.5 (58.1)	18.4 (65.1)	26.8 (80.2)	33.6 (92.5)	34.7 (94.5)	37.6 (99.7)	37.9 (100.2)	34.7 (94.5)	35.6 (96.1)	28.4 (83.1)	22.7 (72.9)	14.3 (57.7)	37.9 (100.2)
Mean daily maximum °C (°F)	−1.2 (29.8)	3.4 (38.1)	10.1 (50.2)	17.9 (64.2)	23.5 (74.3)	27.9 (82.2)	29.3 (84.7)	27.2 (81.0)	22.1 (71.8)	15.6 (60.1)	7.5 (45.5)	0.4 (32.7)	15.3 (59.6)
Daily mean °C (°F)	−8.4 (16.9)	−3.9 (25.0)	3.0 (37.4)	10.7 (51.3)	16.7 (62.1)	21.3 (70.3)	23.0 (73.4)	21.0 (69.8)	15.6 (60.1)	8.6 (47.5)	0.6 (33.1)	−6.5 (20.3)	8.5 (47.3)
Mean daily minimum °C (°F)	−14.0 (6.8)	−9.7 (14.5)	−3.0 (26.6)	3.9 (39.0)	9.8 (49.6)	14.7 (58.5)	17.3 (63.1)	15.7 (60.3)	10.2 (50.4)	3.0 (37.4)	−4.7 (23.5)	−11.9 (10.6)	2.6 (36.7)
Record low °C (°F)	−28.0 (−18.4)	−24.8 (−12.6)	−21.3 (−6.3)	−10.3 (13.5)	−2.4 (27.7)	2.8 (37.0)	9.7 (49.5)	6.2 (43.2)	−1.6 (29.1)	−11.2 (11.8)	−20.6 (−5.1)	−27.1 (−16.8)	−28.0 (−18.4)
Average precipitation mm (inches)	2.1 (0.08)	3.3 (0.13)	8.2 (0.32)	16.7 (0.66)	31.8 (1.25)	44.1 (1.74)	85.2 (3.35)	84.8 (3.34)	52.2 (2.06)	20.9 (0.82)	9.2 (0.36)	1.4 (0.06)	359.9 (14.17)
Average precipitation days (≥ 0.1 mm)	1.9	2.2	3.3	3.7	5.9	8.5	10.5	10.2	8.8	4.9	2.7	1.4	64
Average snowy days	3.2	3.3	2.7	0.9	0.1	0	0	0	0	0.5	2.2	2.5	15.4
Average relative humidity (%)	51	45	39	35	38	46	58	63	62	55	52	50	50
Mean monthly sunshine hours	217.6	210.2	246.3	262.4	291.7	284.4	274.2	250.6	221.7	238.4	217.3	210.8	2,925.6
Percentage possible sunshine	71	69	66	66	66	64	61	60	60	70	73	72	67
Source: China Meteorological Administration

Climate data for Wushenzhao Town, Uxin Banner, elevation 1,312 m (4,304 ft), (1991–2020 normals)
Month	Jan	Feb	Mar	Apr	May	Jun	Jul	Aug	Sep	Oct	Nov	Dec	Year
Mean daily maximum °C (°F)	−2.0 (28.4)	2.7 (36.9)	9.5 (49.1)	17.4 (63.3)	23.1 (73.6)	27.5 (81.5)	29.0 (84.2)	26.9 (80.4)	21.8 (71.2)	15.2 (59.4)	6.9 (44.4)	−0.4 (31.3)	14.8 (58.6)
Daily mean °C (°F)	−11.0 (12.2)	−6.0 (21.2)	1.5 (34.7)	9.6 (49.3)	15.9 (60.6)	20.6 (69.1)	22.4 (72.3)	20.2 (68.4)	14.6 (58.3)	7.2 (45.0)	−1.3 (29.7)	−8.8 (16.2)	7.1 (44.8)
Mean daily minimum °C (°F)	−18.1 (−0.6)	−13.3 (8.1)	−5.7 (21.7)	1.7 (35.1)	7.9 (46.2)	12.9 (55.2)	15.8 (60.4)	14.2 (57.6)	8.4 (47.1)	0.6 (33.1)	−7.6 (18.3)	−15.5 (4.1)	0.1 (32.2)
Average precipitation mm (inches)	2.1 (0.08)	3.1 (0.12)	8.3 (0.33)	14.9 (0.59)	28.9 (1.14)	40.3 (1.59)	87.8 (3.46)	88.6 (3.49)	43.6 (1.72)	18.5 (0.73)	7.8 (0.31)	1.8 (0.07)	345.7 (13.63)
Average precipitation days (≥ 0.1 mm)	1.7	2.1	3.2	3.4	5.9	8.0	11.1	10.2	9.0	4.7	2.5	1.5	63.3
Average snowy days	2.3	3.0	2.7	1.0	0	0	0	0	0	0.6	1.8	2.2	13.6
Average relative humidity (%)	56	49	41	36	39	48	60	66	65	58	56	55	52
Mean monthly sunshine hours	227.8	220.5	259.2	279.0	308.7	301.3	293.9	270.5	240.7	247.1	225.3	220.8	3,094.8
Percentage possible sunshine	75	72	69	70	69	68	65	65	65	72	76	76	70
Source: China Meteorological Administration

Climate data for Henan Township, Uxin Banner, elevation 1,210 m (3,970 ft), (1991–2020 normals)
Month	Jan	Feb	Mar	Apr	May	Jun	Jul	Aug	Sep	Oct	Nov	Dec	Year
Mean daily maximum °C (°F)	−0.2 (31.6)	4.7 (40.5)	11.5 (52.7)	19.0 (66.2)	24.3 (75.7)	28.3 (82.9)	29.5 (85.1)	27.4 (81.3)	22.8 (73.0)	16.7 (62.1)	9.1 (48.4)	1.7 (35.1)	16.2 (61.2)
Daily mean °C (°F)	−10.1 (13.8)	−4.7 (23.5)	2.9 (37.2)	10.7 (51.3)	16.7 (62.1)	21.1 (70.0)	22.6 (72.7)	20.6 (69.1)	15.2 (59.4)	8.0 (46.4)	−0.1 (31.8)	−7.8 (18.0)	7.9 (46.3)
Mean daily minimum °C (°F)	−17.7 (0.1)	−12.3 (9.9)	−4.8 (23.4)	2.2 (36.0)	8.2 (46.8)	13.0 (55.4)	15.9 (60.6)	14.4 (57.9)	8.7 (47.7)	1.1 (34.0)	−6.7 (19.9)	−14.8 (5.4)	0.6 (33.1)
Average precipitation mm (inches)	2.5 (0.10)	3.1 (0.12)	8.6 (0.34)	19.4 (0.76)	28.6 (1.13)	41.1 (1.62)	72.3 (2.85)	79.7 (3.14)	54.9 (2.16)	22.7 (0.89)	10.0 (0.39)	1.7 (0.07)	344.6 (13.57)
Average precipitation days (≥ 0.1 mm)	2.2	2.1	3.3	4.4	5.6	7.8	10.0	9.8	8.9	5.8	2.8	1.5	64.2
Average snowy days	3.2	2.8	2.0	0.7	0	0	0	0	0	0.6	1.9	2.1	13.3
Average relative humidity (%)	59	52	46	43	45	52	64	71	71	65	62	59	57
Mean monthly sunshine hours	214.5	199.9	234.9	252.9	275.1	272.9	265.5	247.1	214.2	225.1	212.9	207.9	2,822.9
Percentage possible sunshine	70	65	63	64	62	62	60	59	58	66	71	70	64
Source: China Meteorological Administration
