= Dalad Banner =

Dalad Banner 达拉特旗 • ᠳᠠᠯᠠᠳ ᠬᠣᠰᠢᠭᠤ
- Banner
- Location in Inner Mongolia Dalad (China)
- Coordinates: 40°24′N 110°02′E
- Country: China
- Autonomous region: Inner Mongolia
- Prefecture-level city: Ordos
- Banner seat: Shulinzhao

Area
  - Total: 8,241.07 km^{2} (3,181.89 sq mi)
- Elevation: 1,009 m (3,310 ft)

Population (2020)
  - Total: 328,593
  - Density: 39.8726/km^{2} (103.270/sq mi)
- Time zone: UTC+8 (China Standard)
- Website: www.dlt.gov.cn

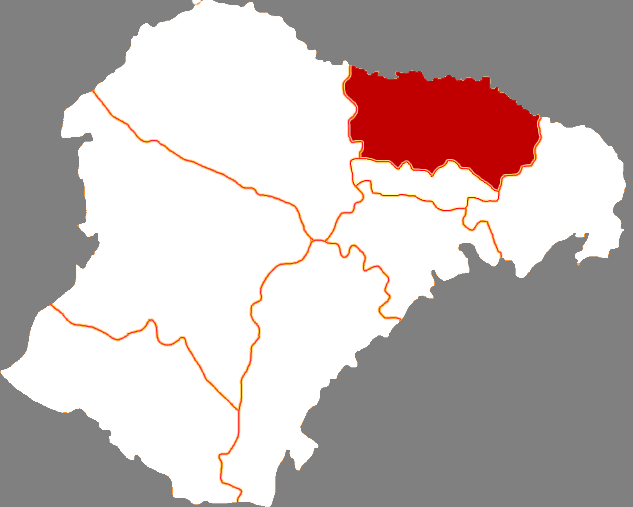
Map

Dalad Banner

Chinese name
- Simplified Chinese: 达拉特旗
- Traditional Chinese: 達拉特旗
Transcriptions
Standard Mandarin
- Hanyu Pinyin: Dálātè Qí

Mongolian name
- Mongolian Cyrillic: Далад хошуу
- Mongolian script: ᠳᠠᠯᠠᠳ ᠬᠣᠰᠢᠭᠤ
Transcriptions
- SASM/GNC: Dalad qosiɣu

Dalad Banner (Mongolian: ᠳᠠᠯᠠᠳ ᠬᠣᠰᠢᠭᠤ; Chinese: 达拉特旗) is a banner of western Inner Mongolia, China, lying on the southern (right) bank of the Yellow River. It is under the administration of Ordos City, although it is closer to the city of Baotou, 33 kilometres (21 mi) to the north-northwest.

== Administrative divisions ==
Dalad Banner is made up of 6 subdistrict, 8 towns, and 1 sum.

Name	Simplified Chinese	Hanyu Pinyin	Mongolian (Hudum Script)	Mongolian (Cyrillic)	Administrative division code
Subdistricts
Gongye Subdistrict	工业街道	Gōngyè Jiēdào	ᠠᠵᠤ ᠦᠢᠯᠡᠳᠪᠦᠷᠢ ᠶᠢᠨ ᠵᠡᠭᠡᠯᠢ ᠭᠤᠳᠤᠮᠵᠢ	Аж үйлдвэрийн зээл гудамж	150621001
Zhaojun Subdistrict	昭君街道	Zhāojūn Jiēdào	ᠵᠣᠤ ᠵᠢᠶᠦᠨ ᠵᠡᠭᠡᠯᠢ ᠭᠤᠳᠤᠮᠵᠢ	Жуу жион зээл гудамж	150621002
Xin Subdistrict	锡尼街道	Xīní Jiēdào	ᠰᠢᠨ᠎ᠡ ᠵᠡᠭᠡᠯᠢ ᠭᠤᠳᠤᠮᠵᠢ	Шинэ зээл гудамж	150621003
Baita Subdistrict	白塔街道	Báitǎ Jiēdào	ᠴᠠᠭᠠᠨ ᠰᠤᠪᠤᠷᠭ᠎ᠠ ᠵᠡᠭᠡᠯᠢ ᠭᠤᠳᠤᠮᠵᠢ	Цагаан суварга зээл гудамж	150621004
Xiyuan Subdistrict	西园街道	Xīyuán Jiēdào	ᠰᠢ ᠶᠤᠸᠠᠨ ᠵᠡᠭᠡᠯᠢ ᠭᠤᠳᠤᠮᠵᠢ	Ший юан зээл гудамж	150621005
Pingyuan Subdistrict	平原街道	Píngyuán Jiēdào	ᠫᠢᠩ ᠶᠤᠸᠠᠨ ᠵᠡᠭᠡᠯᠢ ᠭᠤᠳᠤᠮᠵᠢ	Пин юан зээл гудамж	150621006
Towns
Shulinzhao Town	树林召镇	Shùlínzhào Zhèn	ᠱᠠᠭᠵᠠᠮᠤᠨᠢ ᠪᠠᠯᠭᠠᠰᠤ	Шагжамуни балгас	150621100
Jegstai Town	吉格斯太镇	Jígésītài Zhèn	ᠵᠡᠭᠡᠰᠦᠲᠠᠢ ᠪᠠᠯᠭᠠᠰᠤ	Зээстэй балгас	150621101
Bainijing Town	白泥井镇	Báiníjǐng Zhèn	ᠪᠠᠢ ᠨᠢ ᠵᠢᠩ ᠪᠠᠯᠭᠠᠰᠤ	Бай нь жин балгас	150621102
Wanggin Ju Town	王爱召镇	Wáng'àizhào Zhèn	ᠸᠠᠩ ᠤᠨ ᠵᠤᠤ ᠪᠠᠯᠭᠠᠰᠤ	Вангийн жуу балгас	150621103
Zhaojun Town	昭君镇	Zhāojūn Zhèn	ᠵᠣᠤ ᠵᠢᠶᠦ᠋ᠨ ᠪᠠᠯᠭᠠᠰᠤ	Жуу жион балгас	150621104
Enghebei Town	恩格贝镇	Ēngébèi Zhèn	ᠡᠩᠬᠡᠪᠡᠢ ᠪᠠᠯᠭᠠᠰᠤ	Энхбай балгас	150621105
Zhonghexi Town	中和西镇	Zhōnghéxī Zhèn	ᠵᠦᠩ ᠾᠧ ᠰᠢ ᠪᠠᠯᠭᠠᠰᠤ	Жүн ге ший балгас	150621106
Fengshuiliang Town	风水梁镇	Fēngshuǐliáng Zhèn	ᠹᠧᠩ ᠱᠦᠢ ᠯᠢᠶᠠᠩ ᠪᠠᠯᠭᠠᠰᠤ	Фен шүй лан балгас	150621107
Sum
Zandan Ju Sum	展旦召苏木	Zhǎndànzhào Sūmù	ᠽᠠᠨᠳᠠᠨᠵᠤᠤ ᠰᠤᠮᠤ	Занданжуу сум	150621200

Others:

  - Dalad Economic Development Zone (达拉特经济开发区)
  - Ordos City Ecological Demonstration Zone Management Committee (鄂尔多斯市生态示范区管理委员会)

== Climate ==
Climate data for Dalad Banner, elevation 1,011 m (3,317 ft), (1991–2020 normals, extremes 1981–2010)
Month	Jan	Feb	Mar	Apr	May	Jun	Jul	Aug	Sep	Oct	Nov	Dec	Year
Record high °C (°F)	7.3 (45.1)	16.0 (60.8)	25.3 (77.5)	33.6 (92.5)	36.4 (97.5)	39.8 (103.6)	39.3 (102.7)	36.7 (98.1)	34.8 (94.6)	27.6 (81.7)	19.3 (66.7)	9.9 (49.8)	39.8 (103.6)
Mean daily maximum °C (°F)	−3.9 (25.0)	1.8 (35.2)	9.6 (49.3)	18.5 (65.3)	24.6 (76.3)	29.0 (84.2)	30.3 (86.5)	28.0 (82.4)	23.1 (73.6)	15.8 (60.4)	5.9 (42.6)	−2.1 (28.2)	15.1 (59.1)
Daily mean °C (°F)	−10.9 (12.4)	−5.6 (21.9)	2.4 (36.3)	11.0 (51.8)	17.5 (63.5)	22.1 (71.8)	23.7 (74.7)	21.5 (70.7)	15.8 (60.4)	8.2 (46.8)	−0.8 (30.6)	−8.5 (16.7)	8.0 (46.5)
Mean daily minimum °C (°F)	−16.4 (2.5)	−11.6 (11.1)	−3.9 (25.0)	3.6 (38.5)	10.0 (50.0)	15.0 (59.0)	17.6 (63.7)	15.8 (60.4)	9.8 (49.6)	2.2 (36.0)	−5.9 (21.4)	−13.5 (7.7)	1.9 (35.4)
Record low °C (°F)	−29.7 (−21.5)	−30.3 (−22.5)	−20.7 (−5.3)	−10.5 (13.1)	−2.8 (27.0)	1.4 (34.5)	9.8 (49.6)	5.9 (42.6)	−2.7 (27.1)	−10.0 (14.0)	−22.1 (−7.8)	−30.3 (−22.5)	−30.3 (−22.5)
Average precipitation mm (inches)	1.8 (0.07)	4.0 (0.16)	8.6 (0.34)	12.8 (0.50)	27.4 (1.08)	36.0 (1.42)	78.9 (3.11)	83.8 (3.30)	46.5 (1.83)	17.8 (0.70)	7.3 (0.29)	2.1 (0.08)	327 (12.88)
Average precipitation days (≥ 0.1 mm)	1.4	2.1	3.3	3.0	5.4	7.6	9.9	9.9	7.9	4.3	2.4	1.9	59.1
Average snowy days	2.6	3.6	2.3	0.7	0.1	0	0	0	0	0.1	2.4	3.2	15
Average relative humidity (%)	57	49	41	34	37	46	60	65	63	56	56	56	52
Mean monthly sunshine hours	210.4	215.1	257.7	280.8	306.0	298.8	291.3	279.6	248.3	249.3	208.0	199.2	3,044.5
Percentage possible sunshine	70	71	69	70	68	67	64	66	67	73	71	69	69
Source: China Meteorological Administration

== Economy ==
The local industrial zone Dalad Economic Development Zone is home to chemical plants, aluminum smelters, and one of the world's largest bitcoin mining operations. The operator of the zone's bitcoin mine Bitmain produced in 2017 about 5% of the world's daily production of Bitcoin in a facility with 25,000 computers tended to by about 50 employees.

However, Inner Mongolia plans to ban cryptocurrency mining from April 2021.
