= Kangbashi District =

Kangbashi District 康巴什区 • ᠬᠢᠶ᠎ᠠ ᠪᠠᠭᠰᠢ ᠳᠤᠭᠤᠷᠢᠭ
- District
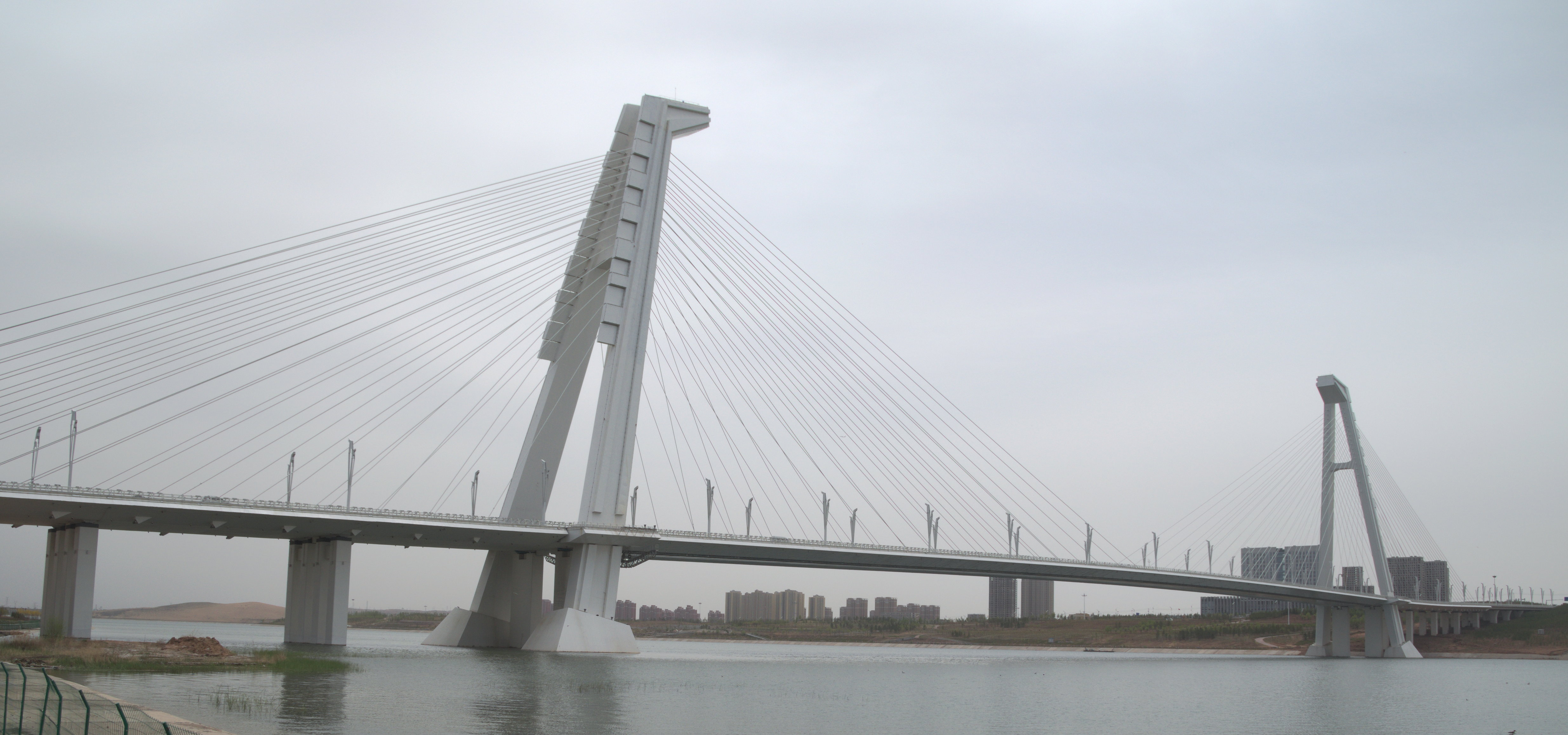
- Kangbashi Bridge

- Location in Inner Mongolia Kangbashi (China)
- Coordinates: 39°35′49″N 109°47′28″E
- Country: China
- Autonomous region: Inner Mongolia
- Prefecture-level city: Ordos
- District seat: Binhe Subdistrict

Area
  - District: 352 km^{2} (136 sq mi)
  - Urban (2018): 233 km^{2} (90 sq mi)

Population (2020)
  - District: 118,796
  - Density: 337/km^{2} (874/sq mi)
  - Urban (2018; including Ejin Horo): 200,000
  - Urban density: 860/km^{2} (2,200/sq mi)
- Time zone: UTC+8 (China Standard)
- Website: www.kbs.gov.cn

Kangbashi District

Chinese name
- Simplified Chinese: 康巴什区
- Traditional Chinese: 康巴什區
- Hanyu Pinyin: Kāngbāshí Qū
Transcriptions
Standard Mandarin
- Hanyu Pinyin: Kāngbāshí Qū
- Bopomofo: ㄎㄤ ㄅㄚ ㄕˊ ㄑㄩ
- Gwoyeu Romatzyh: Kangbashyr Chiu
- Wade–Giles: K‘ang^{1}-pa^{1}-shih^{2} Ch‘ü^{1}
- Yale Romanization: Kāngbāshŕ Chyū
- IPA: [kʰáŋ.pá.ʂɻ̩̌ tɕʰý]

Mongolian name
- Mongolian Cyrillic: Хиа багш дугариг
- Mongolian script: ᠬᠢᠶ᠎ᠠ ᠪᠠᠭᠰᠢ ᠳᠤᠭᠤᠷᠢᠭ
Transcriptions
- SASM/GNC: Kiy-a Baγsi Dugarag, Hiya Bagsi dûgûrig

Kangbashi District (Chinese: 康巴什区; Mongolian: ᠬᠢᠶ᠎ᠠ ᠪᠠᠭᠰᠢ ᠳᠤᠭᠤᠷᠢᠭ, Hiya Bagsi dûgûrig) is an urban district of the prefecture-level city of Ordos in Inner Mongolia, China.

The district is internationally known for its opulent civic square and monuments and in 2009, made global headlines for having a population of around 30,000 people, which was considered small relative to the grandeur of the built-up space, and was deemed as a "ghost city". However the district's population has grown since in the years afterwards, and had reached a size of almost 120,000 people in 2021.

== Geography ==
Within the Ordos prefecture, the district is located southwest of Dongsheng, the prior urban center of Ordos, and north of Ejin Horo Banner. Together with Dongsheng District and Ejin Horo Banner, it forms the city's urban core and is also the political and cultural center of Ordos City. Adjacent to the south is Altan Xire, the highly urbanized county seat of Ejin Horo Banner, separated from the district by the Wulan Mulun River.

== History ==
Kangbashi District's predecessor was Qingchunshan Development Zone, an autonomous region level development zone, approved to be established in December 2000. In 2003, the Inner Mongolia Autonomous Region agreed to transfer the administrative area of Qingchunshan Development Zone from Yiqi to Dongsheng District; in June of the same year, the fourth session of the People's Congress of Ordos City considered and passed the resolution of relocating the municipal government to Qingchunshan Development Zone; in May 2004, the municipal people's government approved the detailed control plan and renamed it as Kangbashi New District. In 2006, the urban planning of the new area was approved by the regional government as an important part of the overall urban planning of Ordos, and in July of the same year, the city government moved to the new area as a whole. After the preliminary work of planning, demonstration and approval, the construction of the new district officially started and was mainly carried out in three stages: from 2004 to 2007, the infrastructure construction stage; from 2007 to 2011, the above-ground project construction stage; from 2011 to 2015, the project construction perfection stage.

With an expanding district due to economic exploitation of the local natural resources, but dwindling water supplies due to the continual expansion of the Ordos Desert, Ordos officials were faced with a local infrastructure planning problem. Hence in 2003, Ordos city officials launched the creation of a new 1 million person city district. Located on a 355-square-kilometre (137 mi^{2}) site 25 kilometres (16 mi) from the existing city of Dongsheng, the new city is located next to three existing reservoirs on the site of two former villages.

In 2006, the municipal government moved its operations from Dongsheng to Kangbashi. Afterwards, some of the area's best schools moved to Kangbashi.

By 2010, the current city on a site of 35 square kilometres (14 mi^{2}) had capacity for at least 300,000 people, created with an estimated investment of around 1.1 trillion yuan ($161 billion).

In 2016, the State Council agreed to approve the establishment of county-level Kangbashi District, which is the same administrative division as the original Kangbashi New District.

In 2021, Nikkei Asia reported that after Ordos No. 1 High School and other locally prestigious schools had relocated to the district, property prices in the area increased significantly.

== Administrative divisions ==
Kangbashi District is made up of 4 subdistricts.

Name	Simplified Chinese	Hanyu Pinyin	Mongolian (Hudum Script)	Mongolian (Cyrillic)	Administrative division code
Subdistricts
Hia Bagx Subdistrict	哈巴格希街道	Hǎbāgéxī Jiēdào	ᠬᠢᠶ᠎ᠠ ᠪᠠᠭᠰᠢ ᠵᠡᠭᠡᠯᠢ ᠭᠤᠳᠤᠮᠵᠢ	Хиа багш зээл гудамж	150603001
Qingchunshan Subdistrict	青春山街道	Qīngchūnshān Jiēdào	ᠴᠢᠩ ᠴᠦᠨ ᠱᠠᠨ ᠵᠡᠭᠡᠯᠢ ᠭᠤᠳᠤᠮᠵᠢ	Чин цүн шин зээл гудамж	150603002
Binhe Subdistrict	滨河街道	Bīnhé Jiēdào	ᠪᠢᠨ ᠾᠧ ᠵᠡᠭᠡᠯᠢ ᠭᠤᠳᠤᠮᠵᠢ	Бин ге зээл гудамж	150603003
Kangxin Subdistrict	康新街道	Kāngxīn Jiēdào	ᠺᠠᠩ ᠰᠢᠨ ᠵᠡᠭᠡᠯᠢ ᠭᠤᠳᠤᠮᠵᠢ	Кан шин зээл гудамж	150603008

Other: Ordos City High tech Industrial Park (鄂尔多斯市高新技术产业园区)

== Economy ==
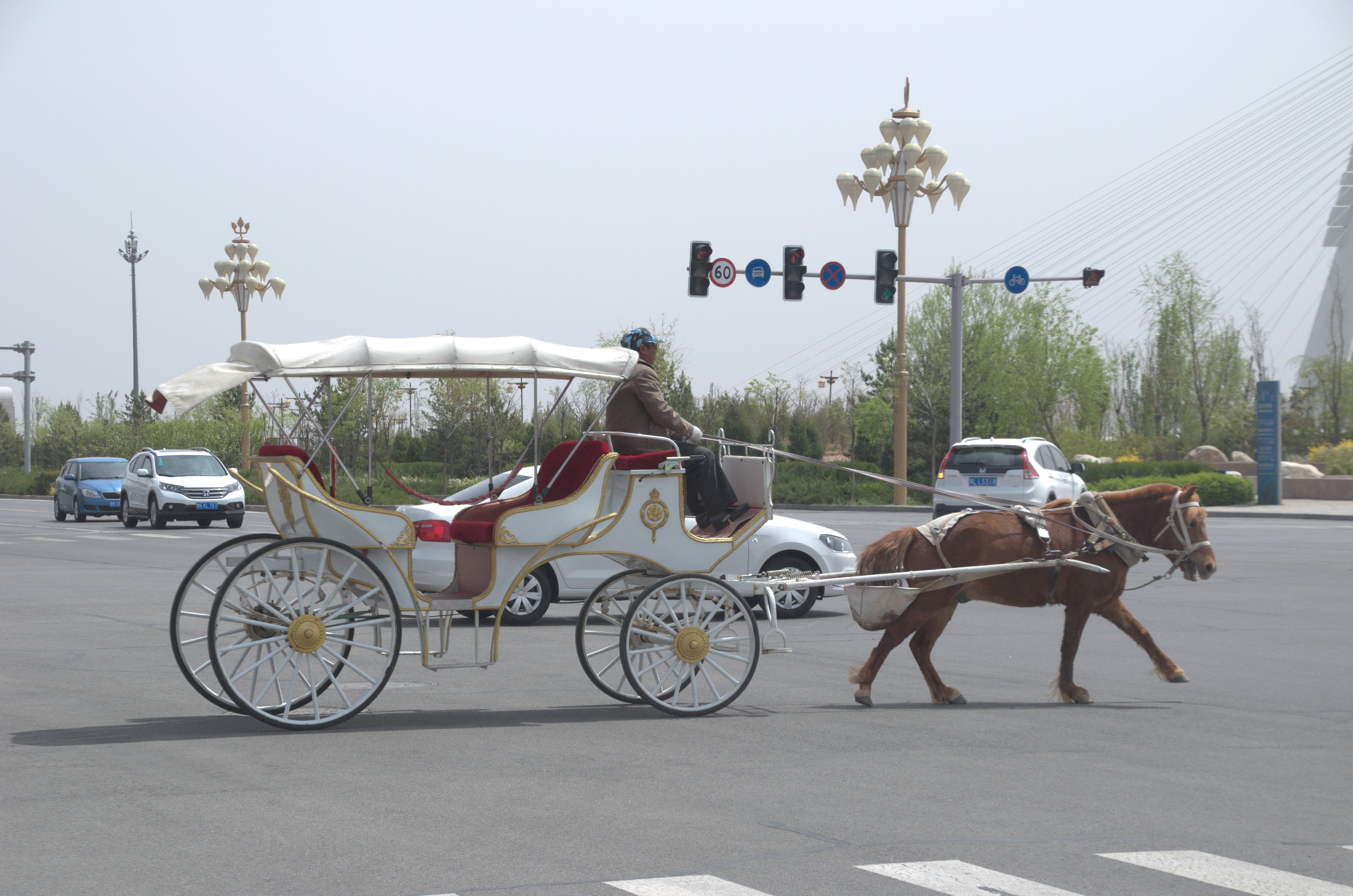
Street of Kangbashi

There is a campus of Beijing Normal University and a municipal library. A five-story shopping mall offers a food court and other shopping. A large "fountain show" provides evening entertainment. Economic activity is gradually picking up with the help of the local government which has relocated its administrative center and high quality high schools here. A documentary has been produced by outside filmmakers which documents the facilities of the city and its gradual growth.

=== Apartment and office capacity ===
Characterized as a ghost town, Kangbashi was made world-famous by a news report in November 2009 from Al Jazeera, later picked up and expanded through an April 2010 article in Time magazine, for having few residents but massive amounts of empty residential housing and high-tech public works projects. Subsequent reports have supported the claims that Kangbashi housed around 20,000 to 30,000 people as of 2010. In 2014, the vacancy rate of new homes was 70%.

Writing in Forbes in 2017, Wade Shepard had questioned the justification for the label of "ghost city" and argued that it was being judged too quickly, as it was too soon to be speculating whether a new city will end up being largely uninhabited in the long run. Shepard noted that when Al Jazeera had visited Kangbashi, the city back then was only five years old, and had around 30,000 people, and that it really should have "impressed the world" for having an entirely new city and partially populating it in just five years' time. Shepard also pointed out that by the end of 2015, housing prices have risen by approximately 50% on average and that in 2017, the population has grown to 153,000 people, and there were around 4,750 businesses in operation in the city, as well as having just 500 apartments still left on the market, out of the 40,000 apartments that had been built since 2004.

== Transportation ==
- China National Highway 210
- Ordos Airport

== See also ==
- Yujiapu Financial District, another Chinese city built from scratch
- Kilamba, an initially empty Chinese-built city in Angola
- Spatial mismatch
