= Belhaven Palace =

Mansion in India

Coordinates: 8°30′56″N 76°57′24″E

Belhaven Palace is a mansion of historic importance located in Thiruvananthapuram, Kerala, India. It currently houses Reserve Bank of India's Visiting Officers' Quarters.

== History ==
The mansion was originally owned by Theodore Lawrence Gomez, a wealthy businessman of Portuguese descent. T.L. Gomez maintained a racecourse around the elevated area around the property. In the late-1880s, the palace became the venue for a club where Europeans in the city socialized. In 1902, the mansion was bought by Sree Moolam Thirunal Rama Varma for his Royal Consort Vadasseri Ammachi Panapillai Amma Srimathi Lakshmi Pillai Karthiani Pillai Kochamma. RBI purchased the bungalow from the descendants of the erstwhile Travancore Royal Family in 1968. The regional office of RBI operated out of this building from 1968 to 1982. In 1984, when Southern Air Command was set up, Belhaven Palace housed the headquarters of the command. It continued to be so till 1996 when the headquarters was moved to Akkulam.
