= Altan Xire =

Altan Xire 阿勒腾席热镇
- Town
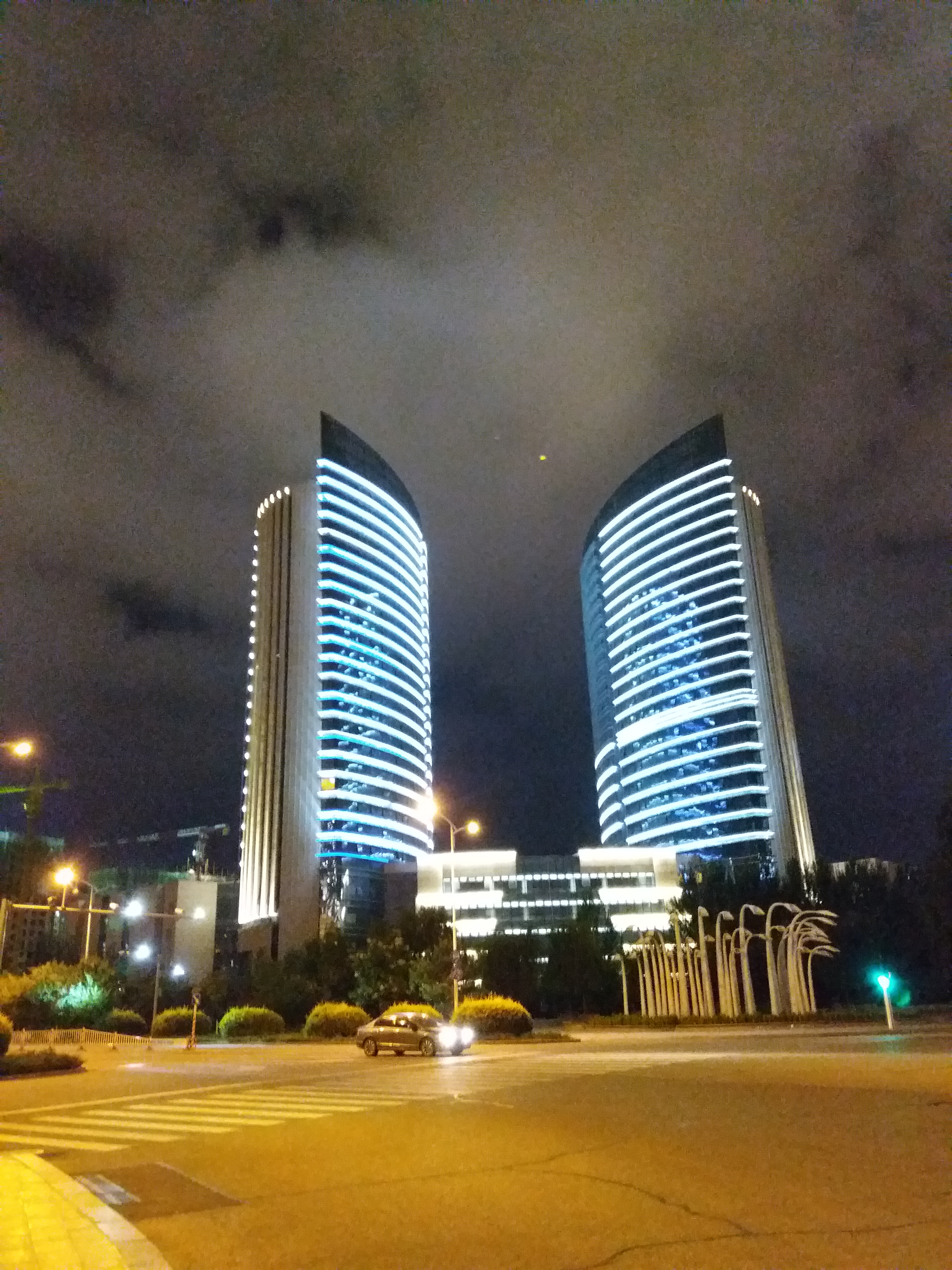
- Newly constructed office buildings in 2017

- Location in Inner Mongolia
- Coordinates (Town government): 39°33′53″N 109°45′12″E
- Country: People's Republic of China
- Region: Inner Mongolia
- Prefecture-level city: Ordos
- Banner: Ejin Horo Banner
- Time zone: UTC+8 (China Standard)

Altan Xire (sometimes rendered as Altanshiree, Atengxilian or Aletengxire; simplified Chinese: 阿勒腾席热镇; traditional Chinese: 阿勒騰席熱鎮; pinyin: Ālèténgxírè zhèn, Mongolian: Алтанширээ) is a town in and the county seat of Ejin Horo Banner, Inner Mongolia. Although administratively the chief town of a rural county, Altan Xire is highly urbanized with a skyscraper-filled central business district worthy of a large metropolis.

== History ==
Starting in the early 2000s, a coal boom in the region provided the local government with ample tax revenue, propelling forward lavish development projects. The government of Ejin Horo Banner utilized its windfall to rebuild its main township of Altan Xire. The build up area of the township was expanded from 4.5 to 32 square kilometres (1.7 to 12.4 sq mi) on the back of 48 billion RMB in spending by 2011. The most lavish of these developments was the construction of 100 high rises for housing for civil servants. In commercial development, an entire skyline was added with the construction of the Cathay Pacific Plaza complex of office towers in 2014.

== Geography ==
The town sits on the south bank of the Wulan Mulun River, a tributary of the Yellow River. On the north bank of the same river is Kangbashi District, known worldwide as a "ghost city" due to the large ceremonial mall area replete with huge monuments and civic buildings but not much human activity. As an adjacent urban area with much of area's housing stock, Altan Xire can be considered an extension of Kangbashi that has organically grown into a bustling city while Kangbashi still lacks liveliness.

== Economy ==
The town skyline includes Cathay Pacific Plaza, an office complex with six office towers taller than 100 metres (330 ft). The tallest two towers are Cathay Pacific Plaza 1 and Cathay Pacific Plaza 2, both 189 metres (620 ft) tall. According to the Council on Tall Buildings and Urban Habitat, the town ranks 172nd among all cities in number of buildings taller than 150 metres (490 ft).
