= Banking Ombudsman Scheme (India) =

Quasi-judicial authority

Banking Ombudsman is a quasi-judicial authority created in 2006, and the authority was created pursuant to a decision made by the Government of India to enable resolution of complaints of customers of banks relating to certain services rendered by the banks. The Banking Ombudsman Scheme was first introduced in India in 1995 and was revised in 2002. The current scheme became operative from 1 January 2006, and replaced and superseded the banking Ombudsman Scheme 2002. Presently the Banking Ombudsman Scheme 2006 (As amended up to 1 July 2017) is in operation.

From 2002 until 2006, around 36,000 complaints have been dealt by the Banking Ombudsmen. There are 22 regional offices of Banking Ombudsmen in India. The latest offices are opened in Jammu, Raipur, Mumbai-II & New Delhi-III.

The type and scope of the complaints which may be considered by a Banking Ombudsman is very comprehensive, and it has been empowered to receive and consider complaints pertaining to the following;

- Non-payment or inordinate delay in the payment or collection of cheques, drafts, bills, etc.;
- Non-acceptance, without sufficient cause, of small denomination notes tendered for any purpose, and for charging of commission for this service;
- Non-acceptance, without sufficient cause, of coins tendered and for charging of commission for this service;
- Non-payment or delay in payment of inward remittances;
- Failure to issue or delay in issue, of drafts, pay orders or bankers’ cheques;
- Non-adherence to prescribed working hours;
- Failure to honour guarantee or letter of credit commitments;
- Failure to provide or delay in providing a banking facility (other than loans and advances) promised in writing by a bank or its direct selling agents;
- Delays, non-credit of proceeds to parties' accounts, non-payment of deposit or non-observance of the Reserve Bank directives, if any, applicable to rate of interest on deposits in any savings, current or other account maintained with a bank;
- Delays in receipt of export proceeds, handling of export bills, collection of bills etc., for exporters provided the said complaints pertain to the bank's operations in India;
- Refusal to open deposit accounts without any valid reason for refusal;
- Levying of charges without adequate prior notice to the customer;
- Non-adherence by the bank or its subsidiaries to the instructions of Reserve Bank on ATM/debit card operations or credit card operations;
- Non-disbursement or delay in disbursement of pension to the extent the grievance can be attributed to the action on the part of the bank concerned, (but not with regard to its employees);
- Refusal to accept or delay in accepting payment towards taxes, as required by Reserve Bank/Government;
- Refusal to issue or delay in issuing, or failure to service or delay in servicing or redemption of Government securities;
- Forced closure of deposit accounts without due notice or without sufficient reason;
- Closure of account without customer concern.
- Refusal to close or delay in closing the accounts;
- Non-adherence to the fair practices code as adopted by the bank; and
- Financial loss incurred to customer due to wrong information given by bank official.
- Any other matter relating to the violation of the directives issued by the Reserve Bank in relation to banking or other services.
- complaints from Non-Resident Indians having accounts in India in relation to their remittances from abroad, deposits and other bank-related matters;

Vide their Circular No.CSD.BOS.4638/13.01.01/2006-07 dated 24 May 2007, the Reserve Bank of India has amended their Banking Ombudsman Scheme, 2006 and the scheme shall be operative with amended effect.

Update: Vide their Notification Ref. CEPD. PRD. No.S873/13.01.001/2021-22, the Reserve Bank of India has introduced a new Integrated Ombudsman Scheme on 12 November 2021.
