= Ejin Horo Banner =

Ejin Horo Banner 伊金霍洛旗 • ᠡᠵᠢᠨ ᠬᠣᠷᠣᠭ᠎ᠠ ᠬᠣᠰᠢᠭᠤ
- Banner
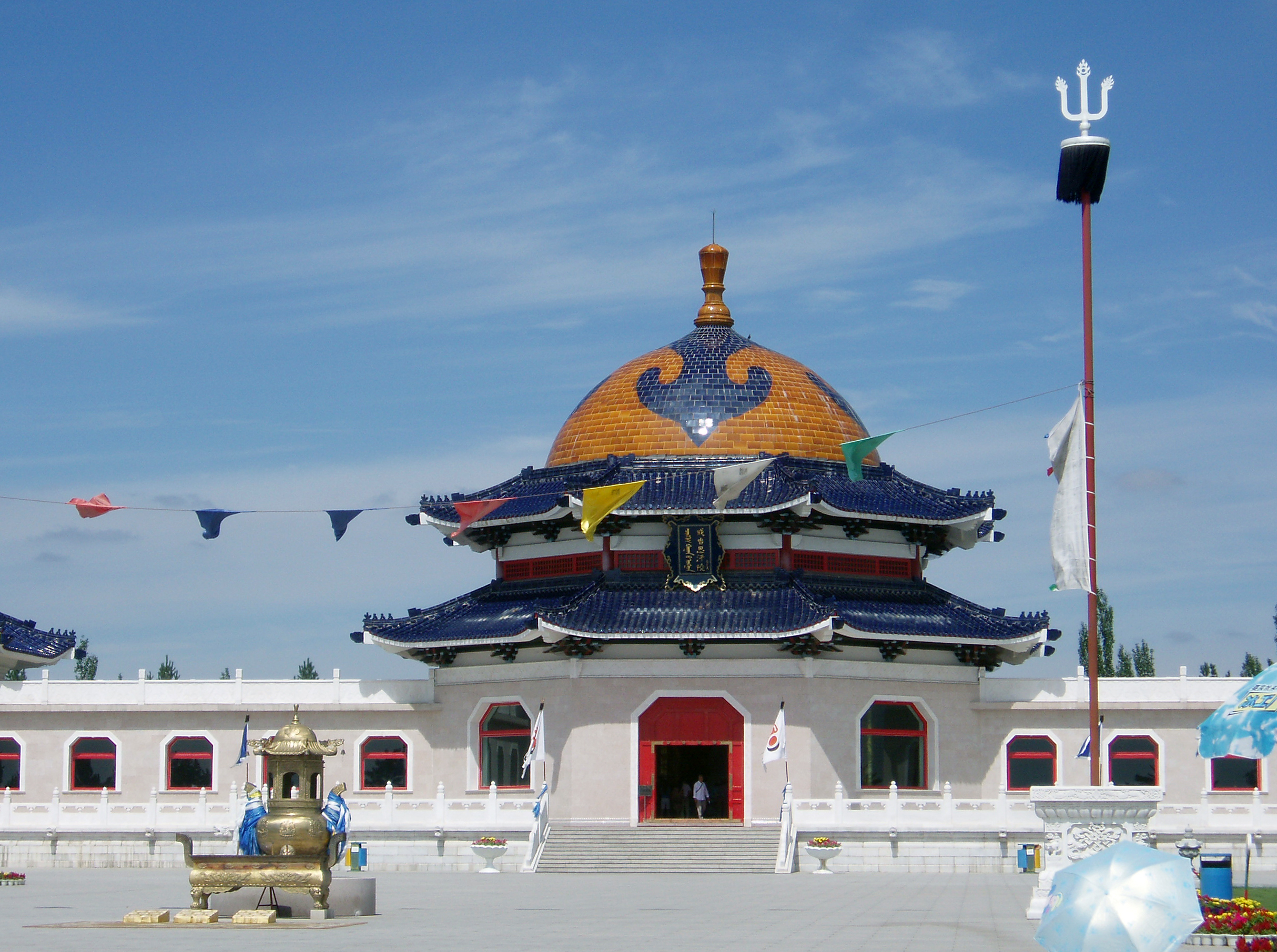
- Mausoleum of Genghis Khan

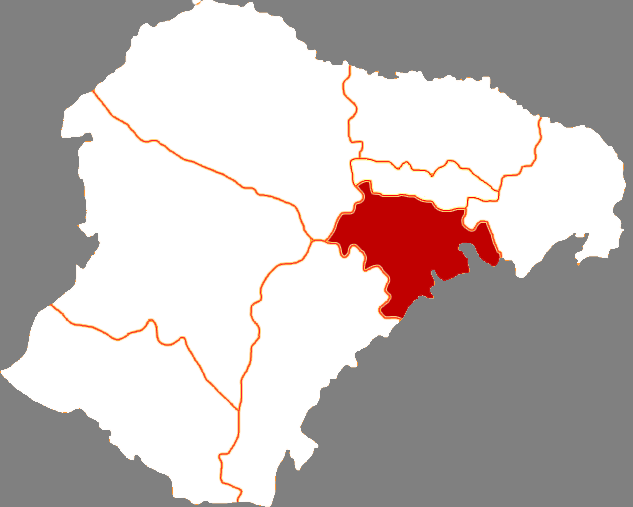
- Ejin Horo in Ordos City

- Location in Inner Mongolia Ejin Horo (China)
- Coordinates: 39°33′53″N 109°44′52″E
- Country: China
- Region: Inner Mongolia
- Prefecture-level city: Ordos City
- Banner seat: Altan Xire

Area
  - Total: 5,958 km^{2} (2,300 sq mi)

Population (2020)
  - Total: 247,983
  - Density: 41.62/km^{2} (107.8/sq mi)
- Time zone: UTC+8 (China Standard)
- Postal code: 017200
- Area code: 0477
- Tourism: Mausoleum of Genghis Khan; Tourist ger camps
- Website: www.yjhl.gov.cn

Ejin Horo Banner

Chinese name
- Chinese: 伊金霍洛旗
- Literal meaning: Ejin Horo Banner
Transcriptions
Standard Mandarin
- Hanyu Pinyin: Yījīnhuòluò qí
- Wade–Giles: I-chin-huo-lo Ch‘i

Mongolian name
- Mongolian Cyrillic: Эзэн Хороо хошуу
- Mongolian script: ᠡᠵᠢᠨ ᠬᠣᠷᠣᠭ᠎ᠠ ᠬᠣᠰᠢᠭᠤ
Transcriptions
- SASM/GNC: Ejin Qoroɣ-a Qosiɣu

The Ejin Horo Banner, also known as Ejin Horo Qi or Yijinhuoluo County, is a banner in Ordos City in southwestern Inner Mongolia, China. It borders Shaanxi Province to the southeast. As of 2009, the Ejin Horo Banner covers an area of almost 5,600 square kilometres (2,200 sq mi), with a population of nearly 160,000, the majority of whom are ethnically Han Chinese.

China's growing economy has led, in recent years, to increased development in the area of the Ejin Horo Banner, with the construction or improvement of roads, transportation centers, and accommodation for travelers and tourists. It is the site of the Mausoleum of Genghis Khan, a AAAAA-rated tourist attraction that does not contain the body of Genghis Khan (Note: For various reasons, the actual tomb of Genghis Khan remains undiscovered.) or, since the Cultural Revolution, any authentic artifacts from his life but which remains important as a cult site in Mongolian religion.

== Name ==
The banner is named for the Mausoleum of Genghis Khan, whose Mongolian name Ejin Horo translates as "the Lord's Enclosure".

== Geography ==
The Ejin Horo Banner, as part of Ordos City, lies on a plateau in the southern portion of the Ordos Desert. The land surface consists primarily of arid grassland or sandy dunes. A tributary of the Yellow River flows through the banner.

== Administrative divisions ==
Ejin Horo Banner is made up of 7 towns.

Name	Simplified Chinese	Hanyu Pinyin	Mongolian (Hudum Script)	Mongolian (Cyrillic)	Administrative division code
Towns
Altan Xire Town	阿勒腾席热镇	Ālèténgxírè Zhèn	ᠠᠯᠲᠠᠨᠰᠢᠷᠡᠭᠡ ᠪᠠᠯᠭᠠᠰᠤ	Алтанширээ балгас	150627100
Jasag Town	札萨克镇	Zhásàkè Zhèn	ᠵᠠᠰᠠᠭ ᠪᠠᠯᠭᠠᠰᠤ	Засаг балгас	150627101
Ulan Moron Town	乌兰木伦镇	Wūlánmùlún Zhèn	ᠤᠯᠠᠭᠠᠨᠮᠥ᠋ᠷᠡᠨ ᠪᠠᠯᠭᠠᠰᠤ	Улаанумран балгас	150627102
Narin Tohoi Town	纳林陶亥镇	Nàlíntáohài Zhèn	ᠨᠠᠷᠢᠨ ᠲᠣᠬᠣᠢ ᠪᠠᠯᠭᠠᠰᠤ	Нарийн духай балгас	150627103
Subrag Town	苏布尔嘎镇	Sūbù'ěrgā Zhèn	ᠰᠤᠪᠤᠷᠭ᠎ᠠ ᠪᠠᠯᠭᠠᠰᠤ	Суварга балгас	150627104
Honqinghe Town	红庆河镇	Hóngqìnghé Zhèn	ᠬᠣᠨᠢᠴᠢᠨ ᠭᠣᠣᠯ ᠪᠠᠯᠭᠠᠰᠤ	Хоньчин гол балгас	150627105
Ejin Horo Town	伊金霍洛镇	Yījīnhuòluò Zhèn	ᠡᠵᠡᠨ ᠬᠣᠷᠣᠭ᠎ᠠ ᠪᠠᠯᠭᠠᠰᠤ	Эзэн хороо балгас	150627106

Others:

  - Mengsu Economic Development Zone, Ordos (鄂尔多斯蒙苏经济开发区)
  - Ordos Airport Logistics Park (鄂尔多斯空港物流园区)

=== Environmental issues ===
Pasture degradation, soil erosion, and desertification were ongoing problems during the late 20th century. From the 1950s through the 1970s, the use of fuel wood and overgrazing from sheep and goats caused up to an estimated annual loss of 1,000 km^{2} (390 sq mi) of arable land. During the 1980s, the rate decreased substantially due to government programs and the availability of coal as a household fuel.

== Climate ==
Climate data for Ejin Horo Banner, elevation 1,367 m (4,485 ft), (1991–2020 normals, extremes 1981–2010)
Month	Jan	Feb	Mar	Apr	May	Jun	Jul	Aug	Sep	Oct	Nov	Dec	Year
Record high °C (°F)	12.7 (54.9)	16.9 (62.4)	25.6 (78.1)	33.2 (91.8)	34.0 (93.2)	37.3 (99.1)	37.4 (99.3)	34.3 (93.7)	34.6 (94.3)	25.9 (78.6)	20.0 (68.0)	13.8 (56.8)	37.4 (99.3)
Mean daily maximum °C (°F)	−2.6 (27.3)	2.0 (35.6)	8.7 (47.7)	16.7 (62.1)	22.6 (72.7)	27.0 (80.6)	28.6 (83.5)	26.4 (79.5)	21.4 (70.5)	14.5 (58.1)	6.2 (43.2)	−1.1 (30.0)	14.2 (57.6)
Daily mean °C (°F)	−10.2 (13.6)	−5.6 (21.9)	1.6 (34.9)	9.7 (49.5)	16.0 (60.8)	20.7 (69.3)	22.5 (72.5)	20.4 (68.7)	14.9 (58.8)	7.6 (45.7)	−0.8 (30.6)	−8.1 (17.4)	7.4 (45.3)
Mean daily minimum °C (°F)	−15.9 (3.4)	−11.5 (11.3)	−4.4 (24.1)	2.9 (37.2)	9.0 (48.2)	14.1 (57.4)	16.7 (62.1)	15.0 (59.0)	9.3 (48.7)	2.0 (35.6)	−5.9 (21.4)	−13.3 (8.1)	1.5 (34.7)
Record low °C (°F)	−29.4 (−20.9)	−28.1 (−18.6)	−23.3 (−9.9)	−10.9 (12.4)	−3.3 (26.1)	2.1 (35.8)	8.9 (48.0)	5.4 (41.7)	−1.9 (28.6)	−10.5 (13.1)	−20.6 (−5.1)	−29.7 (−21.5)	−29.7 (−21.5)
Average precipitation mm (inches)	2.0 (0.08)	2.9 (0.11)	7.8 (0.31)	15.3 (0.60)	27.0 (1.06)	44.7 (1.76)	99.5 (3.92)	86.5 (3.41)	48.5 (1.91)	18.2 (0.72)	7.5 (0.30)	1.8 (0.07)	361.7 (14.25)
Average precipitation days (≥ 0.1 mm)	1.6	2.1	3.3	3.5	5.9	8.8	11.4	11.3	9.0	5.1	2.6	1.5	66.1
Average snowy days	3.3	3.7	3.4	1.2	0	0	0	0	0	1.0	2.7	3.3	18.6
Average relative humidity (%)	53	46	39	34	36	45	57	63	60	54	53	52	49
Mean monthly sunshine hours	221.2	217.1	253.7	277.2	302.3	286.3	279.8	259.8	237.0	241.6	218.5	213.9	3,008.4
Percentage possible sunshine	73	71	68	69	68	64	62	62	64	71	74	74	68
Source: China Meteorological Administration

== Economy ==
The top industries are coal mining and extraction, mineral extraction, chemical engineering, sheep and goat herding, and cashmere production. Total fossil fuel reserves beneath the Ejin Horo Banner are estimated to be about 27.8 billion tons, which includes coal and natural gas. Although coal mining is of paramount importance to the regional economy, the poorly regulated industry has undermined parts of the area so badly that the ground surface has become unstable in places. Because of the relentless coal extraction, parts of one village began caving in; the residents were re-located starting in 2008 to a planned community called Ulanmulun New Village, and has a capacity of 936 families. Because of ground instability, coal mines producing less than 300,000 were shut down in 2000; those producing less than 600,000 tons annually were closed in 2007, drastically reducing the total number of mines in the area.

An industrial park that will focus on the manufacture of equipment for coal mining and fossil fuel extraction is under construction in the banner. The total cost is expected to be around 10 billion yuan (US$1.46 billion), but is expected to produce 8,000 new jobs, and a potential 40,000 secondary jobs.

== Mausoleum of Genghis Khan ==
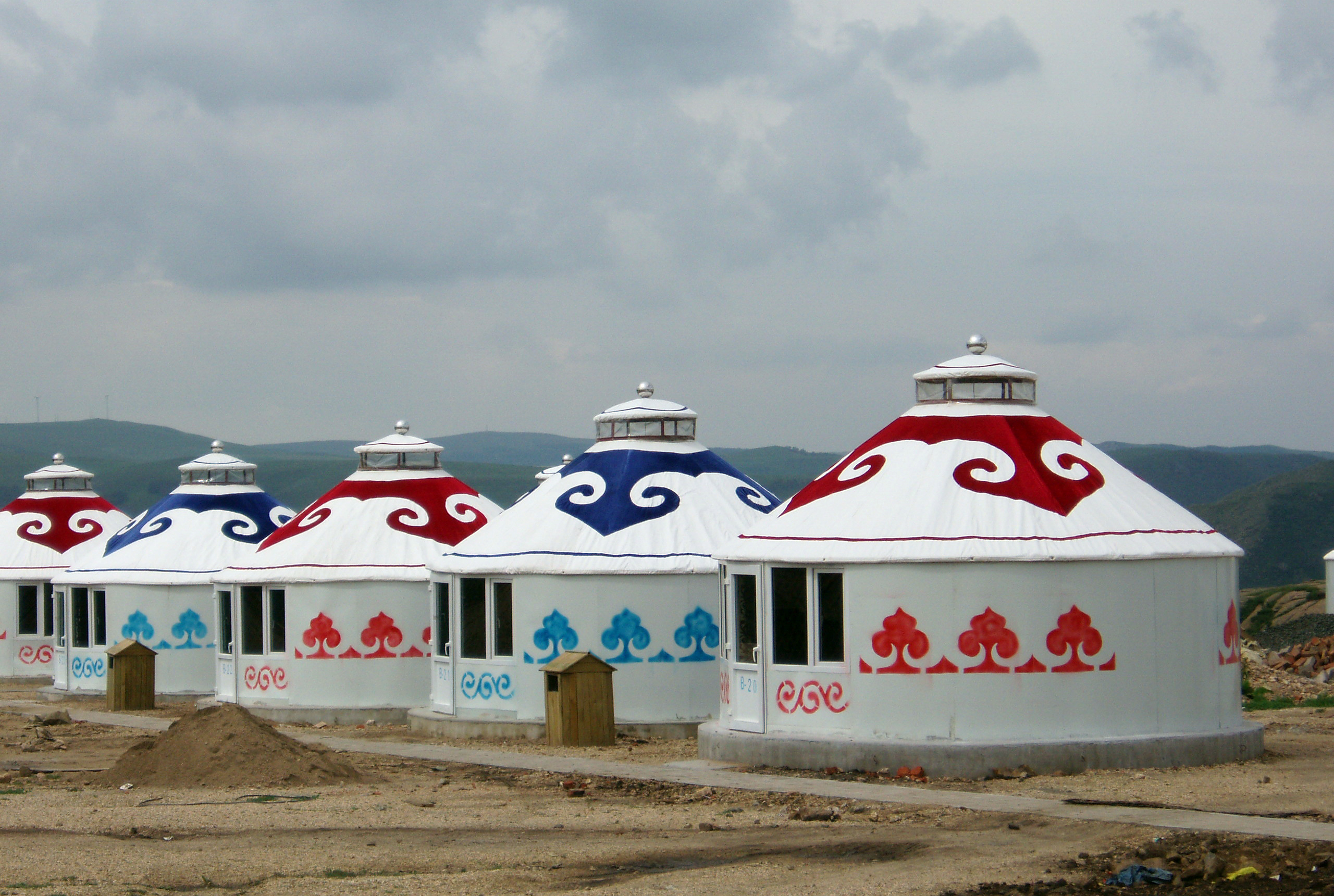
Tourist ger camp in Inner Mongolia

The Ejin Horo Banner is also known as the location of the Mausoleum of Genghis Khan. Ethnic Mongolians in China have made pilgrimages to the mausoleum for decades, especially during the annual Naadam Festival every summer. In recent years, there has been an increase in the number of tourists visiting the site, often wealthy urban Chinese on domestic excursions. Local entrepreneurs are attempting to accommodate these visitors, and capitalize on the new situation; government subsidies reflect an attempt to stimulate the improvement of tourist facilities, which have held a AAAAA rating from China's National Tourism Administration since 2011. The mausoleum does not claim to contain the remains of Genghis Khan. A 17th-century source asserts that only the shirt, shoes, and tent of the great khan were buried at the Ejin Horo Banner, and even the few artifacts at the site were destroyed by Red Guards during the Cultural Revolution. There are other locations in Outer Mongolia that lay claim to the final resting place of Genghis Khan.

Near the official Mausoleum, there is a large, privately owned museum and park dedicated to Genghis Khan. There is also a hotel and there are many tourist ger camps in the area, some of which have horses and offer short trail rides.

== Transportation ==
Buses make regular stops in the Ejin Horo Banner when traveling along China National Highway 210.

The nearest train station is about 33 km (21 mi) away in Dongsheng.

Ordos Airport is in the area.

== See also ==
- Tomb of Genghis Khan
- Altan Tobchi
