= Dongsheng District =

District in Inner Mongolia, People's Republic of China

Dongsheng 东胜区 • ᠳ᠋ᠦᠩᠱᠧᠩ ᠲᠣᠭᠣᠷᠢᠭ Tungsheng
- District
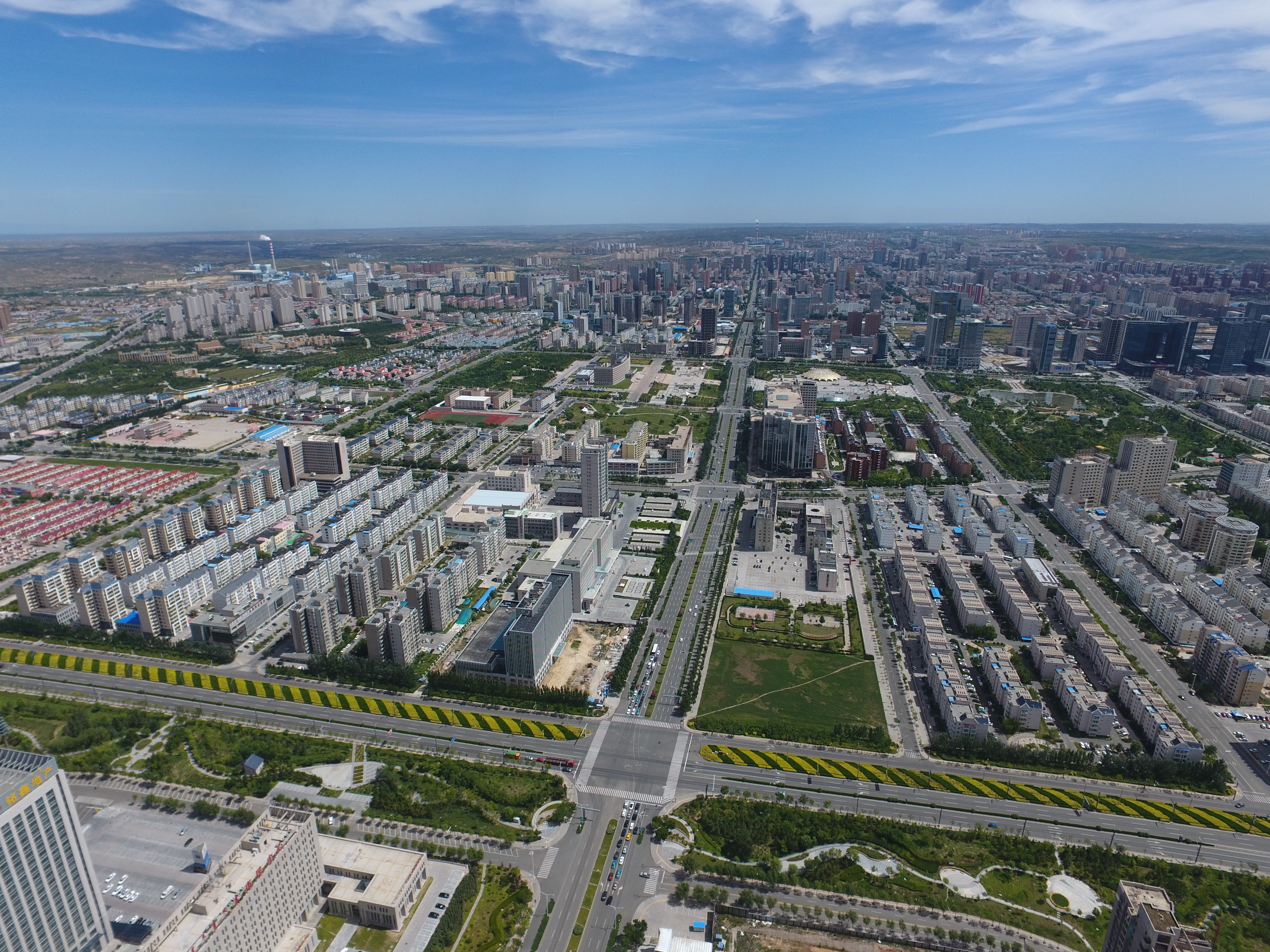
- Skyline of Dongsheng

- Location in Inner Mongolia Dongsheng (China)
- Coordinates: 39°46′N 109°55′E
- Country: China
- Autonomous region: Inner Mongolia
- Prefecture-level city: Ordos
- District seat: Tianjiao Subdistrict

Area
  - District: 2,160 km^{2} (830 sq mi)
  - Urban (2018): 130 km^{2} (50 sq mi)
- Elevation: 1,299 m (4,262 ft)

Population (2020)
  - District: 574,242
  - Density: 266/km^{2} (689/sq mi)
  - Urban (2018): 745,000
  - Urban density: 5,700/km^{2} (15,000/sq mi)
- Time zone: UTC+8 (China Standard)
- Website: www.ds.gov.cn

Dongsheng District

Chinese name
- Simplified Chinese: 东胜区
- Traditional Chinese: 東勝區
Transcriptions
Standard Mandarin
- Hanyu Pinyin: Dōngshèng Qū

Mongolian name
- Mongolian Cyrillic: Донгшенг дүүрэг
- Mongolian script: ᠳ᠋ᠦᠩᠱᠧᠩ ᠲᠣᠭᠣᠷᠢᠭ
Transcriptions
- SASM/GNC: Düŋšėŋ toɣoriɣ

Dongsheng District (Mongolian: ᠳ᠋ᠦᠩᠱᠧᠩ ᠲᠣᠭᠣᠷᠢᠭ; Chinese: 东胜区; alternate spelling English: Koshang; Turkic: Košang) is a district and former seat of Ordos City, Inner Mongolia, China. It has a population of 574,242. The district is predominantly Han Chinese, but has a significant Mongol minority.

== History ==
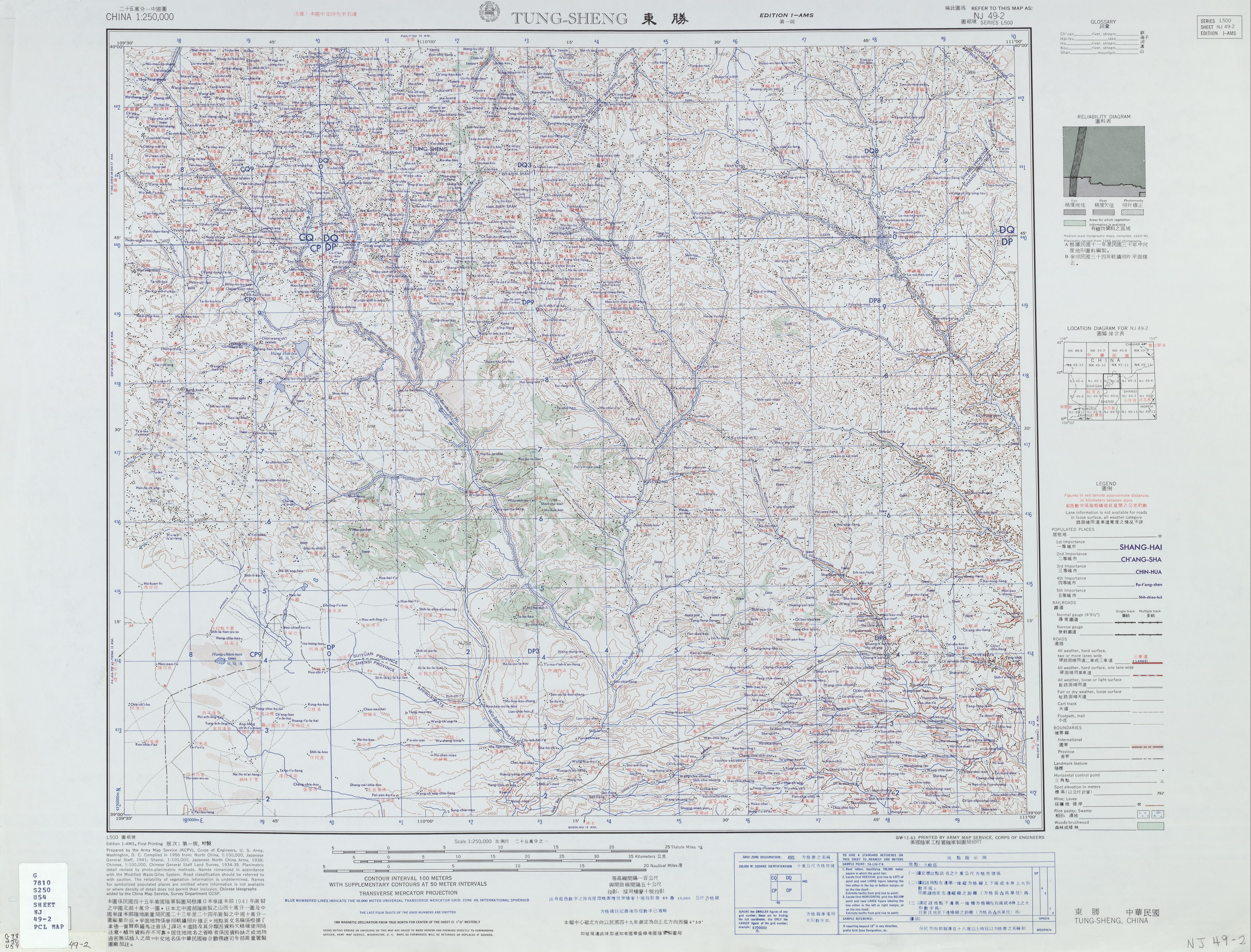
Map including Dongsheng (labeled as 東勝 TUNG-SHENG (walled)) (AMS, 1956)

Dongsheng is also the fastest growing district of Ordos City, half of the district being under construction. To enable further expansion, officials in 2003 planned the nearby district of Kangbashi, a brand new (city) 25 kilometres (16 mi) from Dongsheng.

In 2006, the municipal government moved its operations from Dongsheng to Kangbashi.

== Administrative divisions ==
Dongsheng District is made up of 12 subdistricts and 3 towns.

Name	Simplified Chinese	Hanyu Pinyin	Mongolian (Hudum Script)	Mongolian (Cyrillic)	Administrative division code
Subdistricts
Jiaotong Subdistrict	交通街道	Jiāotōng Jiēdào	ᠵᠠᠮ ᠬᠠᠷᠢᠯᠴᠠᠭ᠎ᠠ ᠵᠡᠭᠡᠯᠢ ᠭᠤᠳᠤᠮᠵᠢ	Зам харилцаа зээл гудамж	150602001
Gongyuan Subdistrict	公园街道	Gōngyuán Jiēdào	ᠴᠡᠴᠡᠷᠯᠢᠭ ᠵᠡᠭᠡᠯᠢ ᠭᠤᠳᠤᠮᠵᠢ	Цэцэрлэг зээл гудамж	150602002
Linyin Subdistrict	林荫街道	Línyīn Jiēdào	ᠯᠢᠨ ᠶᠢᠨ ᠵᠡᠭᠡᠯᠢ ᠭᠤᠳᠤᠮᠵᠢ	Лин ин зээл гудамж	150602003
Jianshe Subdistrict	建设街道	Jiànshè Jiēdào	ᠵᠢᠶᠠᠨ ᠱᠧ ᠵᠡᠭᠡᠯᠢ ᠭᠤᠳᠤᠮᠵᠢ	Жаан ше зээл гудамж	150602004
Fuxing Subdistrict	富兴街道	Fùxīng Jiēdào	ᠹᠦ᠋ ᠰᠢᠩ ᠵᠡᠭᠡᠯᠢ ᠭᠤᠳᠤᠮᠵᠢ	Фү шин зээл гудамж	150602005
Tianjiao Subdistrict	天骄街道	Tiānjiāo Jiēdào	ᠲᠢᠶᠠᠨ ᠵᠢᠶᠣᠤ ᠵᠡᠭᠡᠯᠢ ᠭᠤᠳᠤᠮᠵᠢ	Даяан жяо зээл гудамж	150602006
Olon Subdistrict	诃额伦街道	Hē'élún Jiēdào	ᠥᠭᠡᠯᠥᠨ ᠵᠡᠭᠡᠯᠢ ᠭᠤᠳᠤᠮᠵᠢ	Өэлүн зээл гудамж	150602007
Bayan Mongh Subdistrict	巴音门克街道	Bāyīnménkè Jiēdào	ᠪᠠᠶᠠᠨᠮᠥᠩᠭᠡ ᠵᠡᠭᠡᠯᠢ ᠭᠤᠳᠤᠮᠵᠢ	Баянөмөнх зээл гудамж	150602008
Xingfu Subdistrict	幸福街道	Xìngfú Jiēdào	ᠵᠢᠷᠭᠠᠯ ᠵᠡᠭᠡᠯᠢ ᠭᠤᠳᠤᠮᠵᠢ	Жаргал зээл гудамж	150602010
Fangzhi Subdistrict	纺织街道	Fǎngzhī Jiēdào	ᠨᠡᠬᠡᠮᠡᠯ ᠵᠡᠭᠡᠯᠢ ᠭᠤᠳᠤᠮᠵᠢ	Нэхмэл зээл гудамж	150602011
Xingsheng Subdistrict	兴胜街道	Xīngshèng Jiēdào	ᠰᠢᠩ ᠱᠧᠩ ᠵᠡᠭᠡᠯᠢ ᠭᠤᠳᠤᠮᠵᠢ	Шин шен зээл гудамж	150602012
Minzu Subdistrict	民族街道	Mínzú Jiēdào	ᠦᠨᠳᠦᠰᠦᠲᠡᠨ ᠵᠡᠭᠡᠯᠢ ᠭᠤᠳᠤᠮᠵᠢ	Үндэстэн зээл гудамж	150602012
Towns
Burjang Nur Town	泊尔江海子镇	Bó'ěrjiānghǎizi Zhèn	ᠪᠤᠷᠵᠠᠩ ᠨᠠᠭᠤᠷ ᠪᠠᠯᠭᠠᠰᠤ	Бурзан нуур балгас	150602100
Hantai Town	罕台镇	Hǎntái Zhèn	ᠬᠠᠨᠲᠠᠢ ᠪᠠᠯᠭᠠᠰᠤ	Хантай балгас	150602101
Tongchuan Town	铜川镇	Tóngchuān Zhèn	ᠲᠦᠩ ᠴᠤᠸᠠᠨ ᠪᠠᠯᠭᠠᠰᠤ	Дүн цюан балгас	150602102

- Other:
  - Ordos High-Tech Industrial Development Zone (鄂尔多斯高新技术产业开发区)

== Geography ==
Ordos's prefectural administrative region occupies 86,752 square kilometres (33,495 sq mi) and covers the bigger part of the Ordos Desert, although the urban area itself is relatively small. The region borders the prefectures of Hohhot to the east, Baotou to the northeast, Bayan Nur to the north, Alxa League to the northwest, Wuhai to the west, the Ningxia Hui Autonomous Region to its southwest, and the provinces of Shaanxi and Shanxi to the south.

== Transportation ==
- China National Highway 210
