= Ordos City =

Ordos 鄂尔多斯市 (Chinese) ᠣᠷᠳᠣᠰᠬᠣᠲᠠ (Mongolian)
- Prefecture-level city
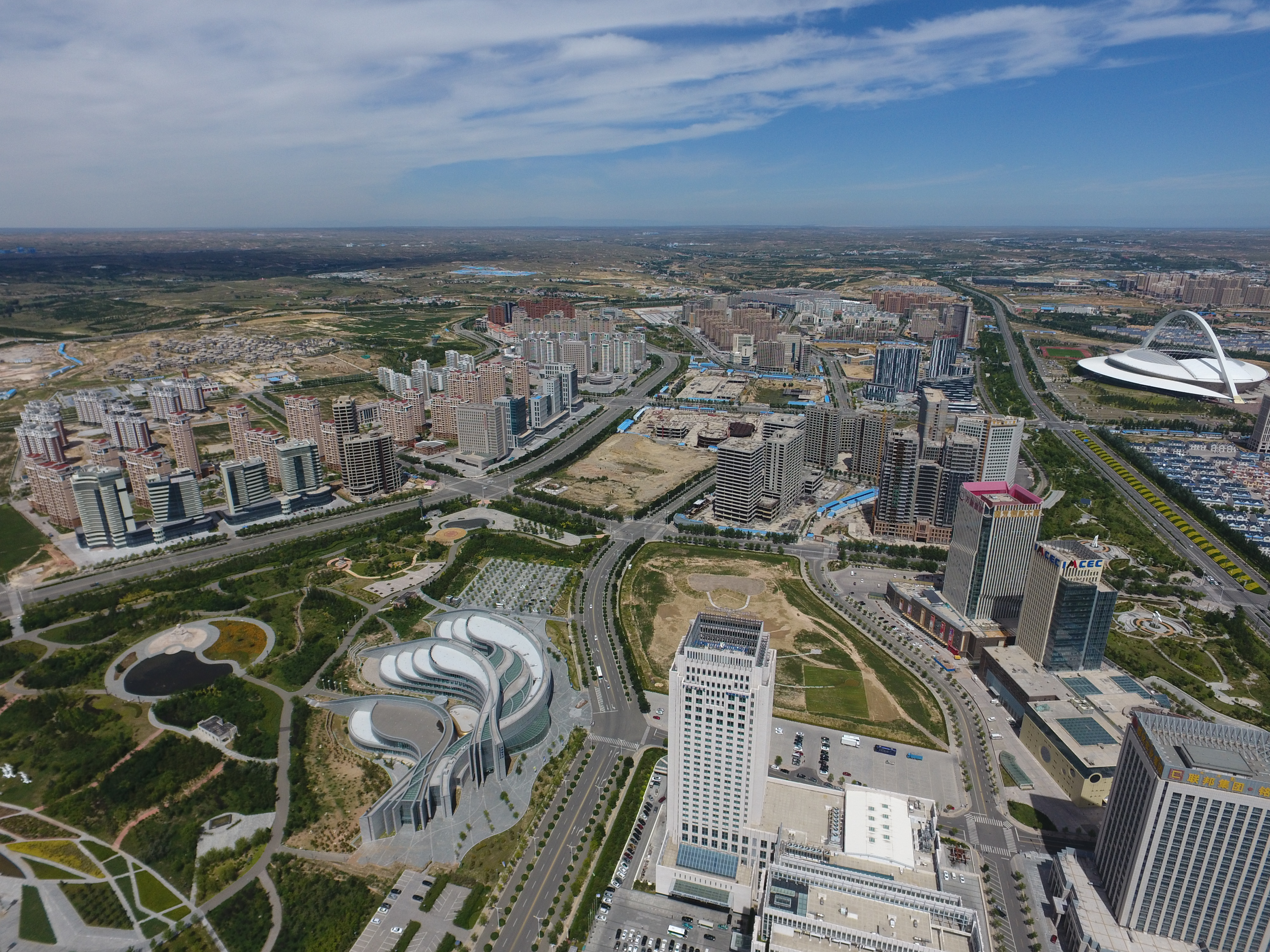
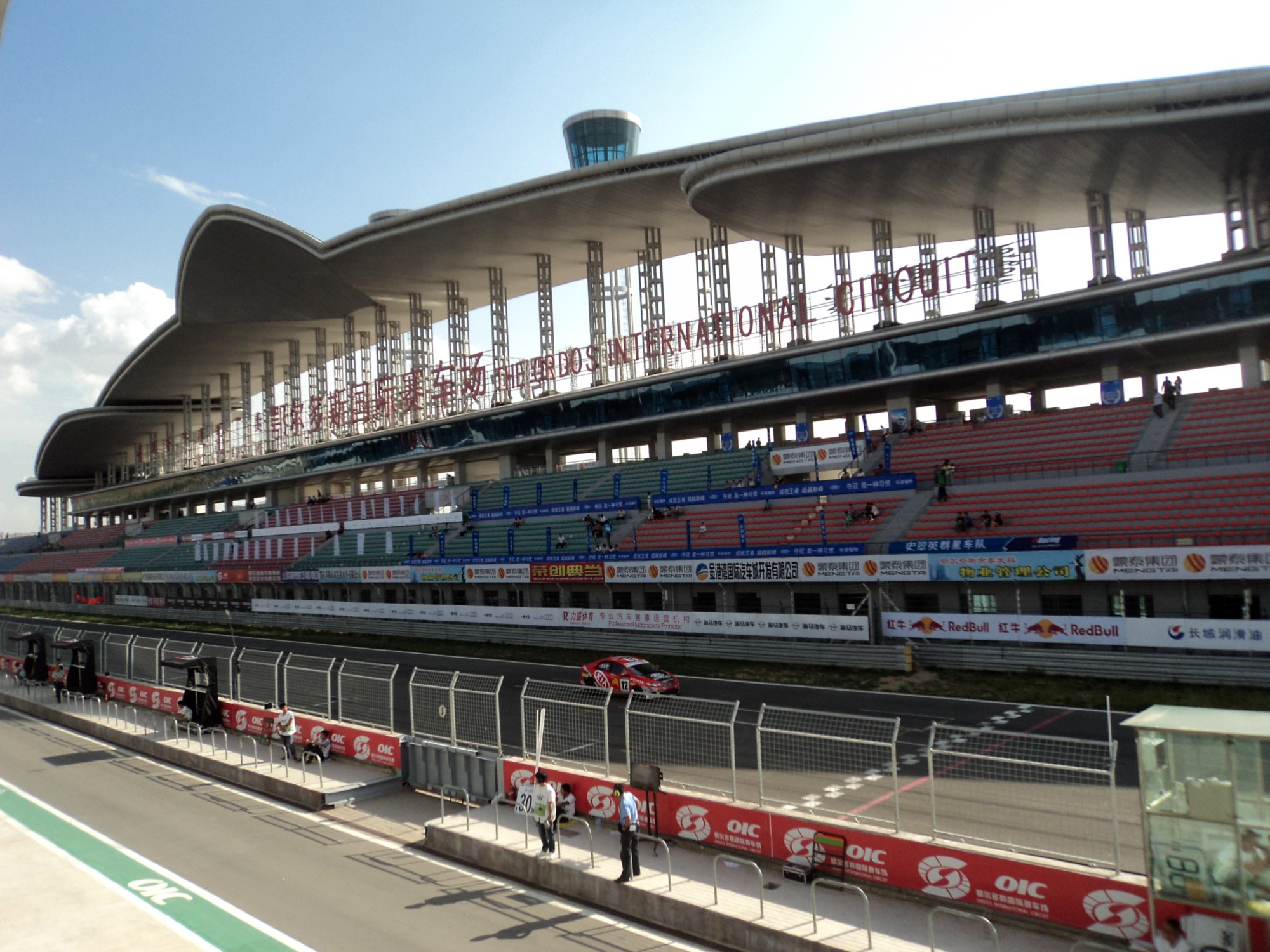
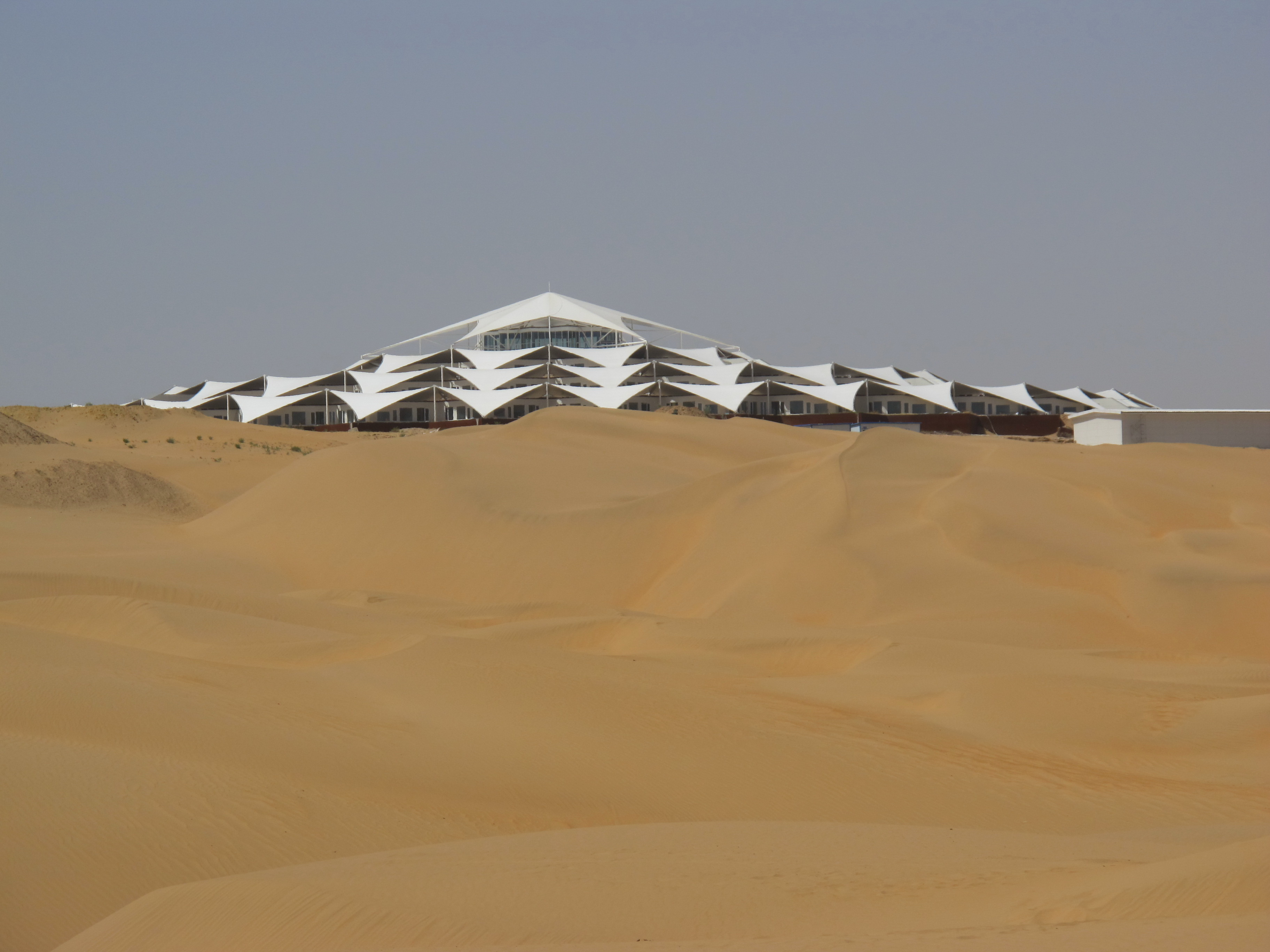
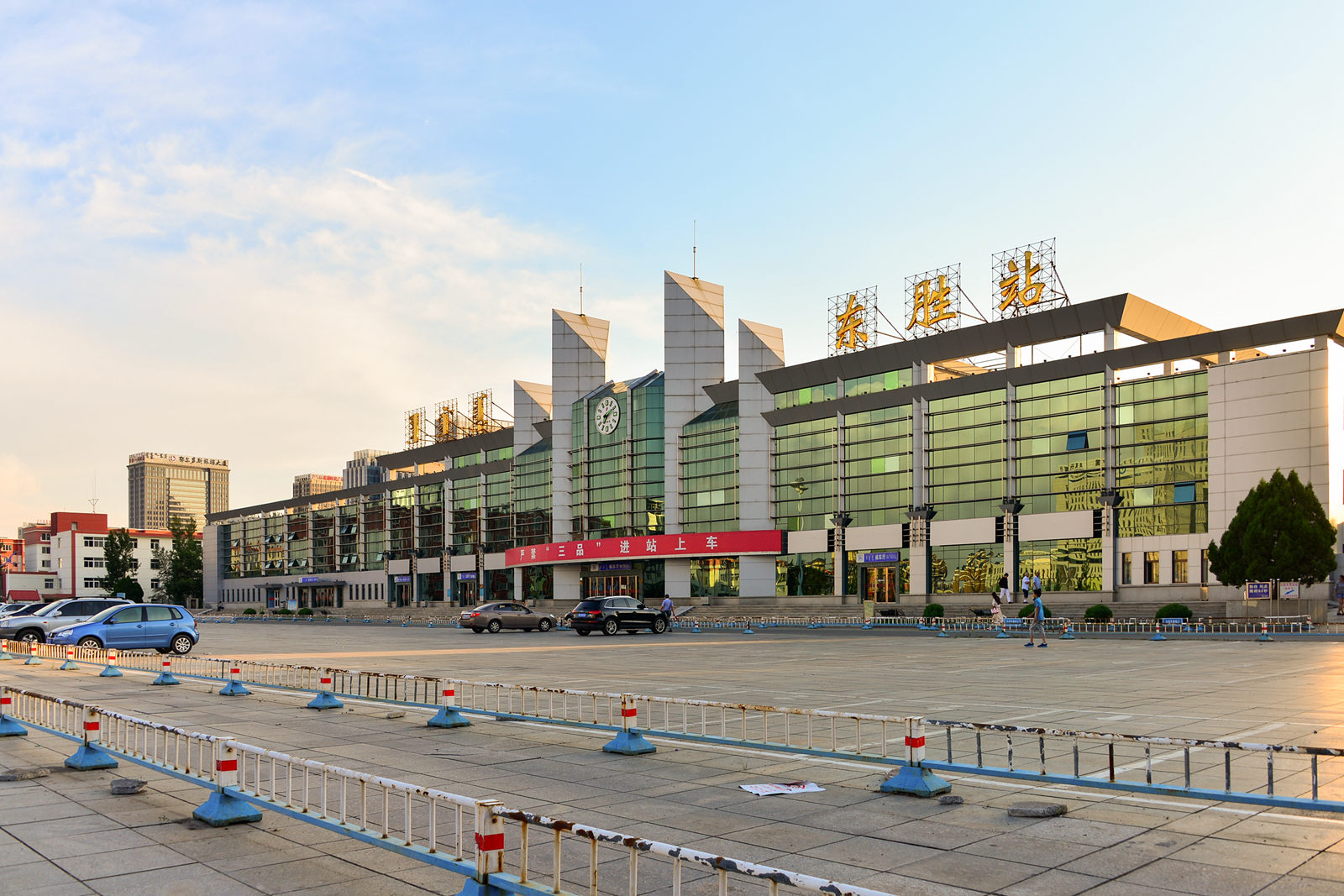
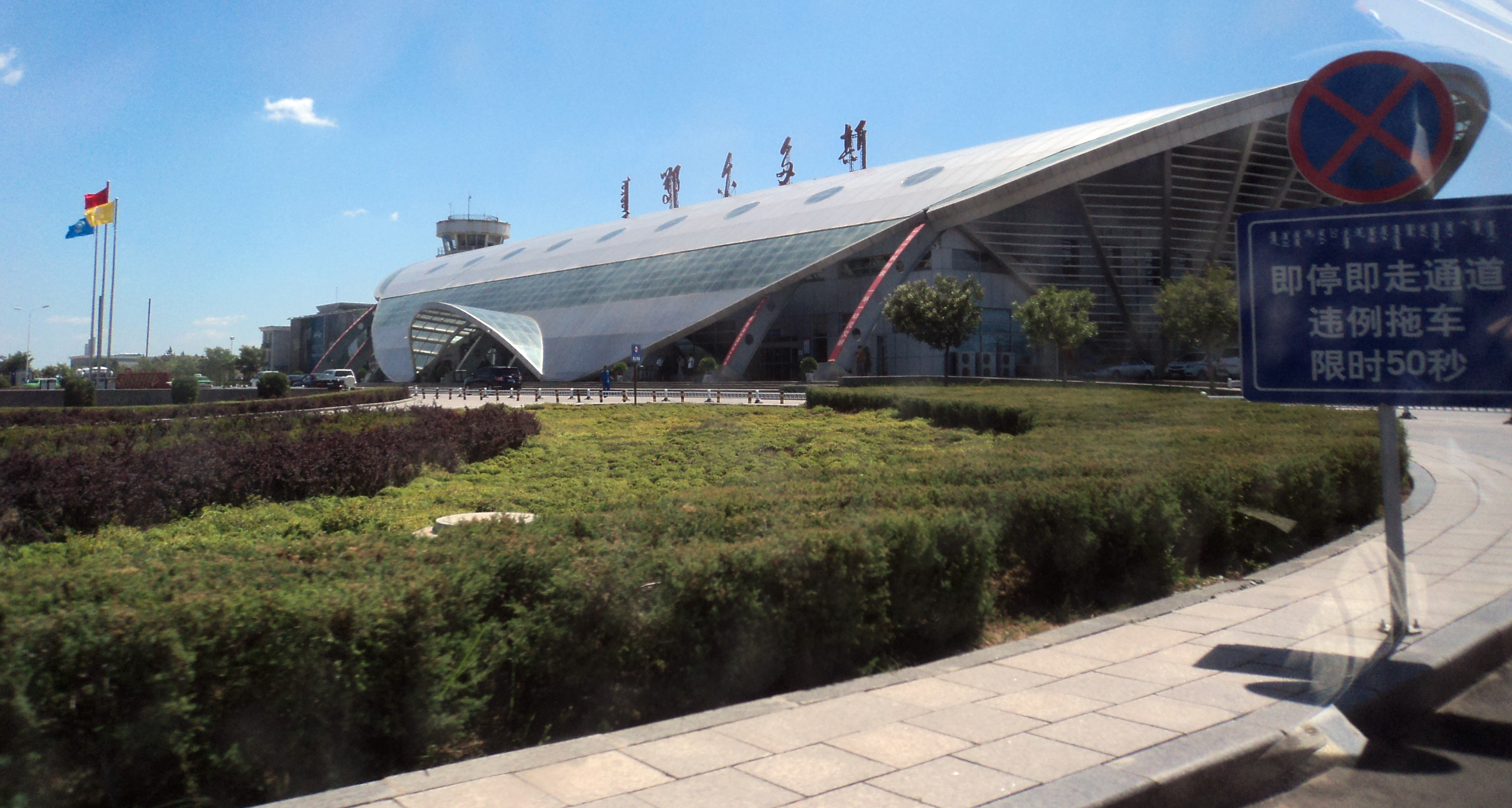
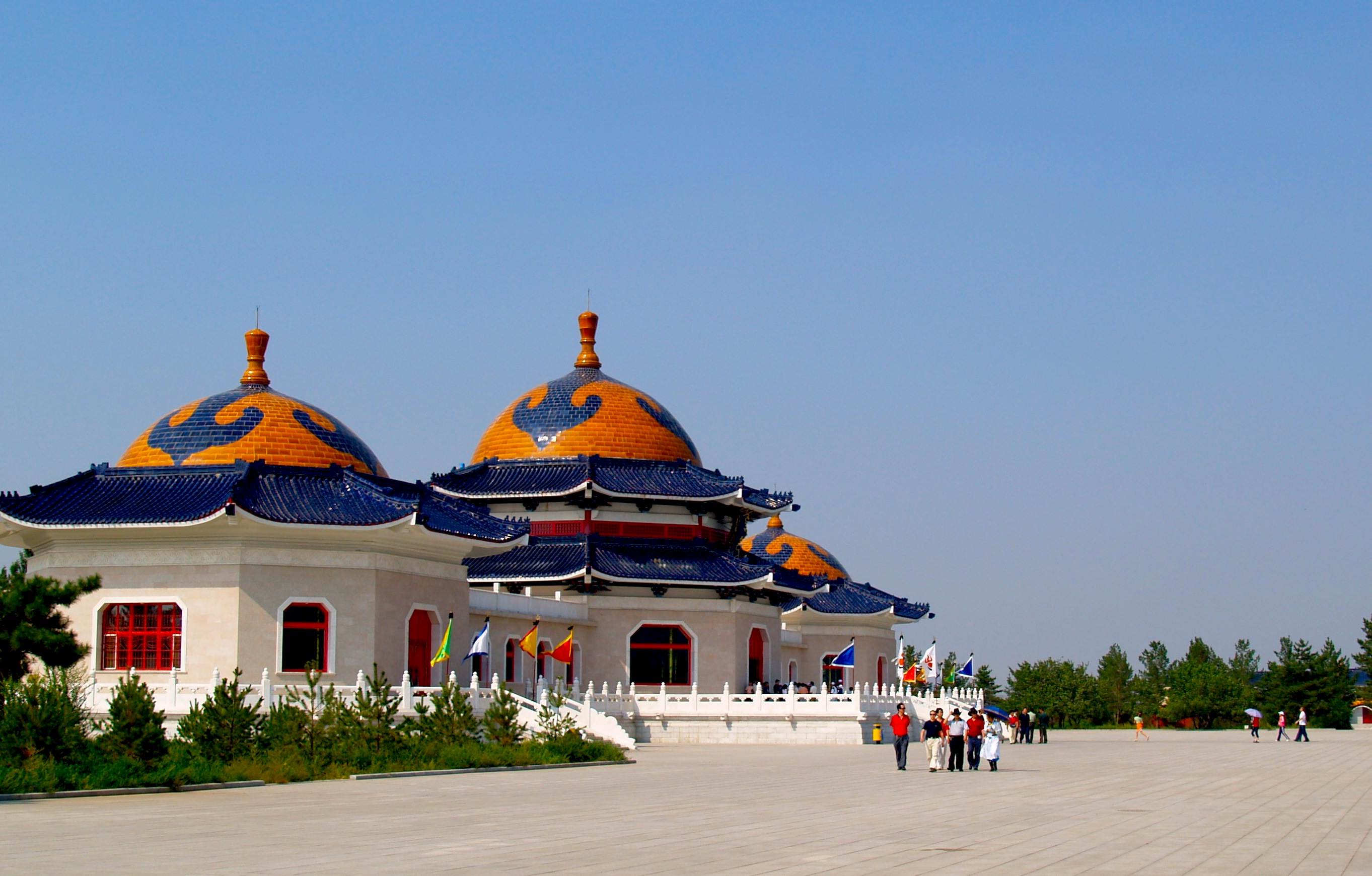
- Dongsheng District skyline Ordos International Circuit Xiangshawan Dong sheng Railway Station Ordos Ejin Horo International Airport Mausoleum of Genghis Khan

- Location of Ordos City jurisdiction in Inner Mongolia (orange)
- Country: People's Republic of China
- Region: Inner Mongolia
- Municipal seat: Kangbashi District

Area
  - Prefecture-level city: 86,752 km^{2} (33,495 sq mi)
  - Urban (2017): 2,526.5 km^{2} (975.5 sq mi)
  - Metro: 5,859.8 km^{2} (2,262.5 sq mi)
- Elevation: 1,305 m (4,281 ft)
- Highest elevation: 2,149 m (7,051 ft)
- Lowest elevation: 850 m (2,790 ft)

Population (2020 census)
  - Prefecture-level city: 2,153,638
  - Density: 24.825/km^{2} (64.297/sq mi)
  - Urban: 693,038
  - Urban density: 274.31/km^{2} (710.45/sq mi)
  - Metro: 366,779
  - Metro density: 62.592/km^{2} (162.11/sq mi)

GDP
  - Prefecture-level city: CN¥ 612.2 billion US$ 88 billion
  - Per capita: CN¥ 274,488, US$ 39,780
- Time zone: UTC+8 (China Standard)
- Postal code: 017000
- ISO 3166 code: CN-NM-06
- Licence plate prefixes: 蒙K
- Administrative division code: 150600
- Website: www.ordos.gov.cn

Ordos City

Chinese name
- Simplified Chinese: 鄂尔多斯市
- Traditional Chinese: 鄂爾多斯市
Transcriptions
Standard Mandarin
- Hanyu Pinyin: È'ěrduōsī Shì
- Bopomofo: ㄜˋ ㄦˇ ㄉㄨㄛ ㄙ ㄕˋ
- Gwoyeu Romatzyh: Eh'eelduosy Shyh
- Wade–Giles: O^{4}-êrh^{3}-to^{1}-ssŭ^{1} Shih^{4}
- Yale Romanization: Èěrdwōsz̄ Shr̀
- IPA: [ɤ̂.àɚ.twó.sɹ̩́ ʂɻ̩̂]

Mongolian name
- Mongolian Cyrillic: Ордос хот
- Mongolian script: ᠣᠷᠳᠣᠰ ᠬᠣᠲᠠ
Transcriptions
- SASM/GNC: Ordos qota

Ordos, (Note: Chinese: 鄂尔多斯; pinyin: È'ěrduōsī; Mongolian: ᠣᠷᠳᠣᠰ ᠬᠣᠲᠠ, Ordos qota) also known as Ih Ju, is one of twelve major subdivisions of Inner Mongolia, China. It lies within the Ordos Plateau of the Yellow River. Ordos has been administered as a prefecture-level city since 2001, although built-up areas make up a small proportion of its surface area. Its population was 2,153,638 as of the 2020 census. Ordos City consists of three separate urban areas, the historical city center Dongsheng (574,242 inhabitants in 2020), a newly developed area at Kangbashi (population 118,796), and Altan Xire (population 141,983).

Ordos emerged as a center of coal mining during the early 2000s, as the prefecture is home to one-sixth of China's total coal reserve. In recent years, Ordos is increasingly transitioning to renewable energy and manufacturing, although coal enterprises remain central to its economy.

Ordos is known for its recent large scale government projects, including most prominently the new Kangbashi District, an urban district planned to be a massive civic mall with many monuments, cultural institutions and other showpiece architecture. It was also the venue for the 2012 Miss World Final. When it was newly built, the streets of the new Kangbashi district were frequently described as a "ghost city" by several Western media outlets. However, in 2017, Wade Shepard stated in a Forbes article that it became increasingly difficult to apply this label as the city's population had surged to 153,000, an increase from 30,000 in 2009.

== Etymology ==
The area was known as the Ih Ju League, also spelled Ikh Juu, (Note: Chinese: 伊克昭盟; pinyin: Yīkèzhāo Méng; Mongolian: ᠶᠡᠬᠡ ᠵᠤᠤ ᠠᠢᠮᠠᠭ, Ih Jûû Aimag) from 1649 to 2001. It was redesignated as a prefecture-level city and renamed to Ordos on 26 February 2001. "Ordos" means "many palaces" in Mongolian. "Ordos" originally referred to a tribe belonging to the Yeke Juu (Ike Chao 'great monastery', i.e. Ih Ju or Guanghui Monastery) league and later included the tribe's area, hence the Ordos, or Ordus, the area within the big bend of the Yellow River. Mongolian ordu(n), ord 'court, residence of a ruler; palace; camp', also for 'camp bodyguards'. According to Ramstedt -s is a plural suffix; further: ordu, orda; Turkic orta 'a center'; Mongolian > Turkish orda 'camp' > Hindustani urdū > English "horde." The name is sometimes claimed to be related to the eight white yurts of Genghis Khan. Linguistically, the Ordos dialect of Mongolian is quite different from neighboring Chakhar Mongolian.

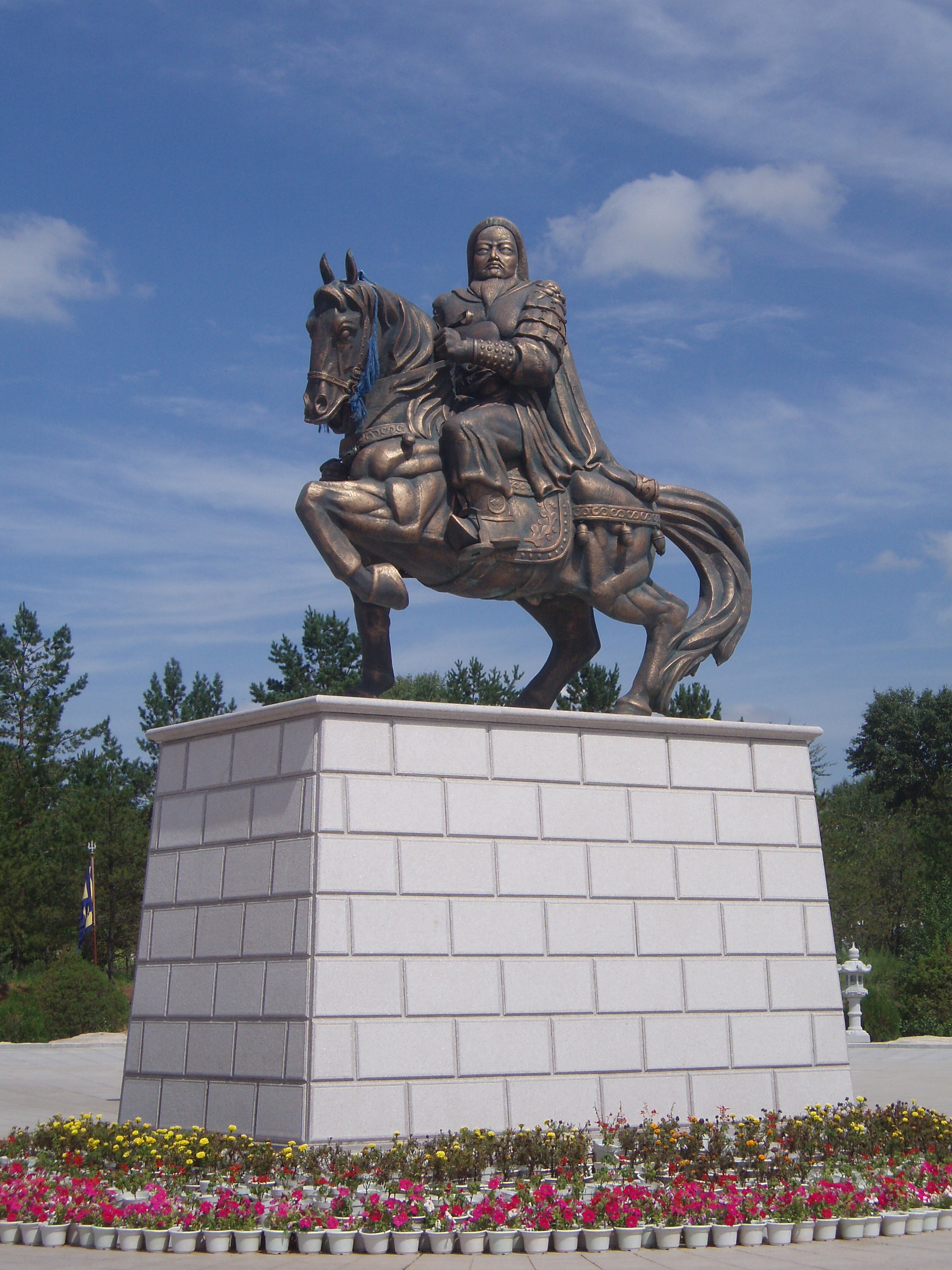
Genghis Khan equestrian sculpture in Ordos City

== History ==
=== Prehistoric civilization ===
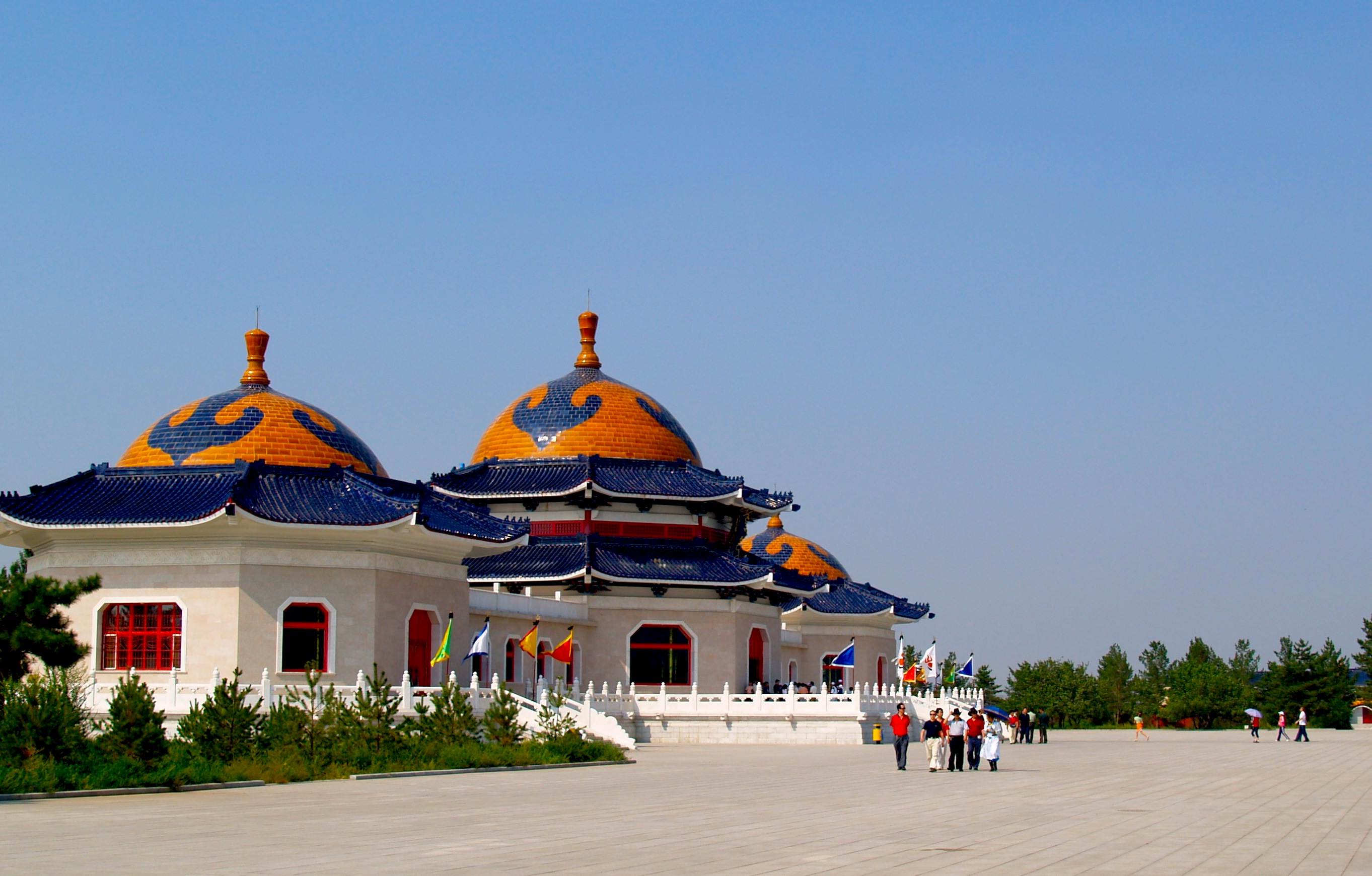
Genghis Khan Mausoleum in the Ejin Horo Banner

The Sarawusu River lies at the southern end of the Ordos grassland. It originates from Dingbian County in northwestern Shaanxi, flowing through the Otog Banner, Uxin Banner, Batuwan Village, and northern Shanxi. It also converges with Xianshui River and finally Wuding River, a tributary of the Yellow River. The Sarawusu river also washed out a U-shaped river valley in the Mu Us Desert. Sarawusu in Mongolian means "thick yellow stream," after the eponymous perennially yellow-colored local river; both sides of the river are covered with swaying red willows, so the river is also called the "Hongliu River" (Red Willow River).

In 1923, French Jesuit Émile Licent first discovered fossils of the Hetao people here. Since then, Chinese archaeologists have visited the site many times. The site is known today as part of the Shuidonggou site complex. A large number of cultural relics have been excavated from this site, some reportedly dating back as far as 100,000 years. However, the chronology of the site remains debated. The material culture created by the Hetao people is now called "Salawusu" or "Shuidonggou" culture. After a comprehensive analysis of geology, animal fossils, and stone tools, this culture was identified as the late Paleolithic culture.

Hetao civilization is viewed as the product of the integration of grassland culture and Yellow River civilization. Its long-term development and complex transmutation process, especially the relationship with Urad and Ordos Mongolian culture, also illustrates the relationship between Hetao civilization and Yellow River civilization. Hetao culture is seen as an important predecessor to the mainstream culture of the northern grasslands.

=== Ancient history ===
Before the Zhou dynasty, Ordos belonged to nomadic peoples such as the Guifang and Lin Hu. In the Warring States Period, it was the Yunzhong County of the state of Zhao, and was conquered by the state of Qin.

At the beginning of the Han dynasty, it lay on the front lines of the Han–Xiongnu War. Emperor Wu of Han set up Shuofang County here. When Emperor Xuan of Han called the Huxie Chanyu to come, Ordos became the residence of the Southern Xiongnu. A short period of intercultural peace persisted until the Uprising of the Five Barbarians broke out during the Western Jin dynasty. Ordos was territories of the pre-Qin and post-Qin dynasties during the Sixteen Kingdoms . It then belonged to the Northern Wei dynasty, the Western Wei dynasty, and the Northern Zhou dynasty of the Northern and Southern dynasties era. In the Sui and Tang dynasties, they were all territories. In the Tang dynasty, the famous General Guo Ziyi once was an officer here. During the Anshi Rebellion, Emperor Suzong of Tang fled to Ordos.

==== Qin Zhidao and Sufang County ====
Qin Zhidao was an important military road for Qin Shi Huang supervised by Meng Tian from 212 BC to 210 BC. Qin Zhidao starts from the Yunyang Linguang Palace in the Xianyang military site and goes to Jinyun County in the north. Qinzhidao passes through Ordos City, three Banners and one district, the Qinzhidao site protection unit is established in Ordos City. It now passes through modern Ordos City, and the Qin Zhidao site protection unit is established in Ordos City.

One of the northern border counties of the Han dynasty, Sufang County was set up in the Western Han dynasty. In 127 BC, Emperor Wu sent Wei Qing and Li Xi to send troops to attack the Xiongnu. Soldiers from Yunzhong County (west of Gaochun) to Fuli (now northern Gansu) helped regain the Hetao area. The jurisdiction of the original Qin dynasty (commonly known as "New Qinzhong"), and the Sufang County in the south of the Yin Mountain, has been identified in the northwestern part of the modern-day Otog Banner.

==== Tongwan City ====
The archaeological site of Tongwan City is located at the junction of Ordos City and Jingbian, Shaanxi Province. It was the capital of the Daxia Kingdom during the Northern dynasties and Sixteen Kingdoms 1500 years ago. The city was built by the Xiongnu leader Helian Bobo, who called himself "Tianwang, Great Chan Yu," from 407 AD to 414 AD.. The city walls were 25 meters thick, with a height of 23.33 meters and a width of 11.16 meters.

==== Eight White Palaces ====
The legend says that when Genghis Khan passed through the present-day Ordos area on his way to conquer the Western Xia Kingdom, he accidentally dropped his whip. Genghis Khan proclaimed on the spot that the water is good and grass is rich here, and he would like to be buried here. In August 1227, Genghis Khan died while on campaign against the Tangut people of Western Xia. Ögedei Khan placed the relics of Genghis Khan in eight white felt tents for worship, collectively known as the Eight White Palaces. Later, Kublai Khan further stipulated the ceremonies and ritual rules of the Eight White Palaces, and put into place the sacred ceremonies. Sacrifices were held throughout the year in the Mongol Empire and the Eight White Palaces became a movable hall and a symbol of the power for the Genghis Khan gold family.

=== Qing dynasty ===
==== Ih Ju League ====
In 1649, the Qing dynasty organized the Ordos Mongols into a league consisting of six banners: the Ordos Left-Wing Middle Banner, Ordos Left-Wing Front Banner (now Jungar Banner), the Ordos Left-Wing Banner (now Dalat Banner), Ordos Right-Wing Middle Banner (now Otog Banner), Ordos Right-Wing Front Banner (now Uxin Banner), and Ordos Right-Wing Banner (now Hanggin Banner), with the later addition of the Ordos Right-Wing Front Banner. The Ordos banners convened at Wang'aizhao (王爱召), als known as the Ih Ju (or Ikh Ju, Yeke Juu; "Great Monastery" in Mongolian).

Due to rapid population growth in the Chinese hinterland, large-scale Han Chinese migrations to Ordos occurred in modern times. The mass migration of people from Shanxi, Shaanxi and other places brought Jin Chinese culture to Ordos.

=== Modern ===
After the Republic of China, the special zone of Suiyuan was established, it was later changed to Suiyuan Province, and Ih Ju League was established. After the Lugou Bridge Incident in 1937, the Japanese occupied most of northern China. In 1938, Inner Mongolia Bailing Temple, Guisui, Baotou and other places were successively lost. After the Japanese invaders occupied Baotou, they went to Ordos to coerce the princes of all ethnic groups and moved the Eight White Palaces of Genghis Khan to Baotou. Initially the Iqzhao League leader Shagdur Zab and the flag princes vowed never to move east, as the Eight White Palaces were an important part of mongolian beliefs. However, the situation was forced, and the Eight White Palaces had to move west to the Xinglong Mountain in Gansu. On 9 June 1939, the Eight White Palaces embarked on a long road to the west. On 21 June, the Eight White Palaces passed through Yan'an, and the Chinese Communist Party presented a wreath to the bier. On June 15th the Eight White Palaces arrived in Xi'an, with the welcome of 200,000 people. The National Government held a grand national festival in accordance with the customs of the Mongolian nation. On 1 July 1939, the Eight White Palaces was placed in Xinglong Mountain, Gansu Province. In 1949, due to the chaos of the Chinese Civil War, the government of the Republic of China moved the Eight White Palaces to the Qinghai Kumbum Monastery.

After the founding of the People's Republic of China, the Eight White Palaces were transferred back to the Inner Mongolia Autonomous Region. In 1954, the Central People's Government of the People's Republic of China moved the Eight White Palaces back to Ejin Hollow.

The modern city of Ordos was established in 2001.

On 8 June 2016, the State Council approved the "Request for the Establishment of Kangbashi District in Ordos City" of Inner Mongolia Autonomous Region: the agreement to set up Kangbashi District in what will be the Habagesh Street, Qingshan Street and Binhe Street in Dongsheng District of Ordos City.

== Geography and climate ==
Ordos's prefectural administrative region occupies 86,752 square kilometers (33,495 sq mi) and covers the bigger part of the Ordos Desert, although the urban area itself is relatively small. It borders the prefecture-level divisions of Hohhot to the east, Baotou to the northeast, Bayan Nur to the north, Alxa League to the northwest, Wuhai to the west, the Ningxia Hui Autonomous Region to its southwest, and the provinces of Shaanxi and Shanxi to the south. The maximal north–south extent is 340 km (210 mi), while from east to west it stretches for 400 km (250 mi).

The most populous municipality is Dongsheng which had a population of 582,544 inhabitants as of the 2010 census. Another urban area is the conglomeration of Kangbashi District and the adjacent township of Altan Xire. Kangbashi is to the north of the Wulan Mulun River, a tributary of the Yellow River, while Altan Xire is to the south of the same river.

The area of Ordos can roughly be divided into a hilly area in the east, high plateaus in the west and center, sandy deserts in the north and south, and plains at the southern bank of the Yellow River. The highest elevation, at 2,149 meters (7,051 ft), is located in the west, and the lowest point, at 850 m (2,790 ft), is in the east.

There are two large deserts in the territory of Ordos: Kubuqi Desert in the north and the Mu Us (Maowusu) Desert in the south. The Kubuqi Desert occupies 19.2% of Ordos, or 16,600 km^{2} (6,400 sq mi), while the Maowusu Desert takes up 28.8% of the area, or 25,000 km^{2} (9,700 sq mi).

Ordos is one of the major coal producing region in China, contributing to approximately 17% of coal output.

Ordos features a cold semi-arid climate (Köppen BSk), marked by long, cold and very dry winters; very warm, somewhat humid summers; and strong winds, especially in spring. The annual precipitation is 300 to 400 millimeters (11.8 to 15.7 in) in the eastern part of the city and 190 to 350 mm (7.5 to 13.8 in) in the western part. Most of the rain falls between July and September, with very little snow in winter; average annual evaporation reaches 2,000 to 3,000 mm (79 to 118 in). In the city proper, the monthly 24-hour average temperature ranges from −10.5 °C (13.1 °F) in January to 21.0 °C (69.8 °F) in July, while the annual mean is 6.16 °C (43.1 °F). Sunshine duration averages 2,700 to 3,200 hours annually.

Climate data for Ordos (Dongsheng District), elevation 1,462 m (4,797 ft), 1991–2020 normals, extremes 1971–2010)
Month	Jan	Feb	Mar	Apr	May	Jun	Jul	Aug	Sep	Oct	Nov	Dec	Year
Record high °C (°F)	11.3 (52.3)	16.6 (61.9)	24.9 (76.8)	32.2 (90.0)	32.9 (91.2)	36.7 (98.1)	36.5 (97.7)	33.3 (91.9)	33.3 (91.9)	24.4 (75.9)	18.7 (65.7)	12.2 (54.0)	36.7 (98.1)
Mean daily maximum °C (°F)	−3.9 (25.0)	0.6 (33.1)	7.3 (45.1)	15.3 (59.5)	21.2 (70.2)	25.7 (78.3)	27.4 (81.3)	25.2 (77.4)	20.1 (68.2)	13.2 (55.8)	4.8 (40.6)	−2.4 (27.7)	12.9 (55.2)
Daily mean °C (°F)	−9.3 (15.3)	−5.1 (22.8)	1.4 (34.5)	9.2 (48.6)	15.3 (59.5)	20.0 (68.0)	21.9 (71.4)	20.0 (68.0)	14.7 (58.5)	7.7 (45.9)	−0.5 (31.1)	−7.4 (18.7)	7.3 (45.2)
Mean daily minimum °C (°F)	−13.1 (8.4)	−9.3 (15.3)	−3.3 (26.1)	3.8 (38.8)	9.7 (49.5)	14.6 (58.3)	17.1 (62.8)	15.6 (60.1)	10.3 (50.5)	3.3 (37.9)	−4.3 (24.3)	−11.1 (12.0)	2.8 (37.0)
Record low °C (°F)	−28.4 (−19.1)	−27.5 (−17.5)	−22.8 (−9.0)	−11.6 (11.1)	−4.8 (23.4)	1.7 (35.1)	9.1 (48.4)	4.3 (39.7)	−2.1 (28.2)	−13.6 (7.5)	−21.8 (−7.2)	−27.1 (−16.8)	−28.4 (−19.1)
Average precipitation mm (inches)	2.1 (0.08)	4.3 (0.17)	9.3 (0.37)	16.2 (0.64)	31.4 (1.24)	52.1 (2.05)	94.5 (3.72)	89.6 (3.53)	52.0 (2.05)	20.7 (0.81)	9.4 (0.37)	2.3 (0.09)	383.9 (15.12)
Average precipitation days (≥ 0.1 mm)	2.3	2.6	3.8	3.8	6.7	9.4	11.5	11.3	8.8	4.8	3.1	2.4	70.5
Average snowy days	3.8	4.5	4.3	1.5	0.2	0	0	0	0	1.2	3.2	4.3	23
Average relative humidity (%)	51	45	38	33	36	44	56	60	57	50	50	50	48
Mean monthly sunshine hours	221.7	217.0	257.7	281.8	306.8	288.3	281.7	267.8	242.0	245.7	218.1	211.7	3,040.3
Percentage possible sunshine	73	71	69	70	69	65	63	64	66	72	74	73	69
Source 1: China Meteorological Administration
Source 2: Weather China

== Economy ==
Ordos is one of the most prosperous regions of China when measured by GDP figures. With a nominal per-capita GDP of US$34,352 and ppp per capita GDP of $65,192 in 2016, it ranks first among prefecture-level divisions in the entire mainland China, and second in the PRC (including Hong Kong & Macau), behind Macau (Nominal GDP per capita: US$67,079; GDP (PPP) per capita: $96,148). It is extremely rich in natural resources, having one sixth of the national coal reserves. The pillars of its economy are textiles (wool), coal mining, petrochemicals, electricity generation, production of building materials, and bitcoin mining. An industrial park in Dalad Banner is home to one of the world's largest bitcoin 'mines' – really a massive server farm – owned by Beijing-based Bitmain.

== Military ==
In 2021, The Washington Times reported that China was building a third ICBM site near Hanggin Banner, Ordos City, in Inner Mongolia. It will hold more than 100 new DF-41 intercontinental ballistic missiles. This will join two other ICBM fields at Yumen and Hami.

== Administrative subdivisions ==
Ordos Shi is divided into two districts and seven banners:

Map
Name	Mongolian	Hanzi	Pinyin	Population (2020)	Area (km^{2})	Density (/km^{2})
Dongsheng District	ᠳ᠋ᠦᠩᠱᠧᠩ ᠲᠣᠭᠣᠷᠢᠭ (Düngšēng toɣorig)	东胜区	Dōngshèng Qū	574,242	2,146	268
Kangbashi District (Hia'bagx District)	ᠬᠢᠶ᠎ᠠ ᠪᠠᠭᠰᠢ ᠲᠣᠭᠣᠷᠢᠭ (Kiy-a baɣsi toɣorig)	康巴什区	Kāngbāshí Qū	118,796	373	319
Dalad Banner	ᠳᠠᠯᠠᠳ ᠬᠣᠰᠢᠭᠤ (Dalad qosiɣu)	达拉特旗	Dálātè Qí	328,593	8,192	40
Ejin Horo Banner	ᠡᠵᠢᠨ ᠬᠣᠷᠣᠭ᠎ᠠ ᠬᠣᠰᠢᠭᠤ (Eǰin Qoroɣ-a qosiɣu)	伊金霍洛旗	Yījīnhuòluò Qí	247,983	5,958	42
Hanggin Banner	ᠬᠠᠩᠭᠢᠨ ᠬᠣᠰᠢᠭᠤ (Qanggin qosiɣu)	杭锦旗	Hángjǐn Qí	110,824	18,903	6
Jungar Banner	ᠵᠡᠭᠦᠨᠭᠠᠷ ᠬᠣᠰᠢᠭᠤ (J̌egünɣar qosiɣu)	准格尔旗	Zhǔngé'ěr Qí	359,184	7,535	48
Otog Banner	ᠣᠲᠣᠭ ᠬᠣᠰᠢᠭᠤ (Otoɣ qosiɣu)	鄂托克旗	Ètuōkè Qí	162,726	20,064	8
Otog Front Banner (Otog Omnod Banner)	ᠣᠲᠣᠭ ᠤᠨ ᠡᠮᠦᠨᠡᠳᠦ ᠬᠣᠰᠢᠭᠤ (Otoɣ-un Emünedü qosiɣu)	鄂托克前旗	Ètuōkè Qián Qí	92,724	12,318	8
Uxin Banner	ᠦᠦᠰᠢᠨ ᠬᠣᠰᠢᠭᠤ (Üüsin qosiɣu)	乌审旗	Wūshěn Qí	158,566	11,645	14

== Kangbashi New Area ==
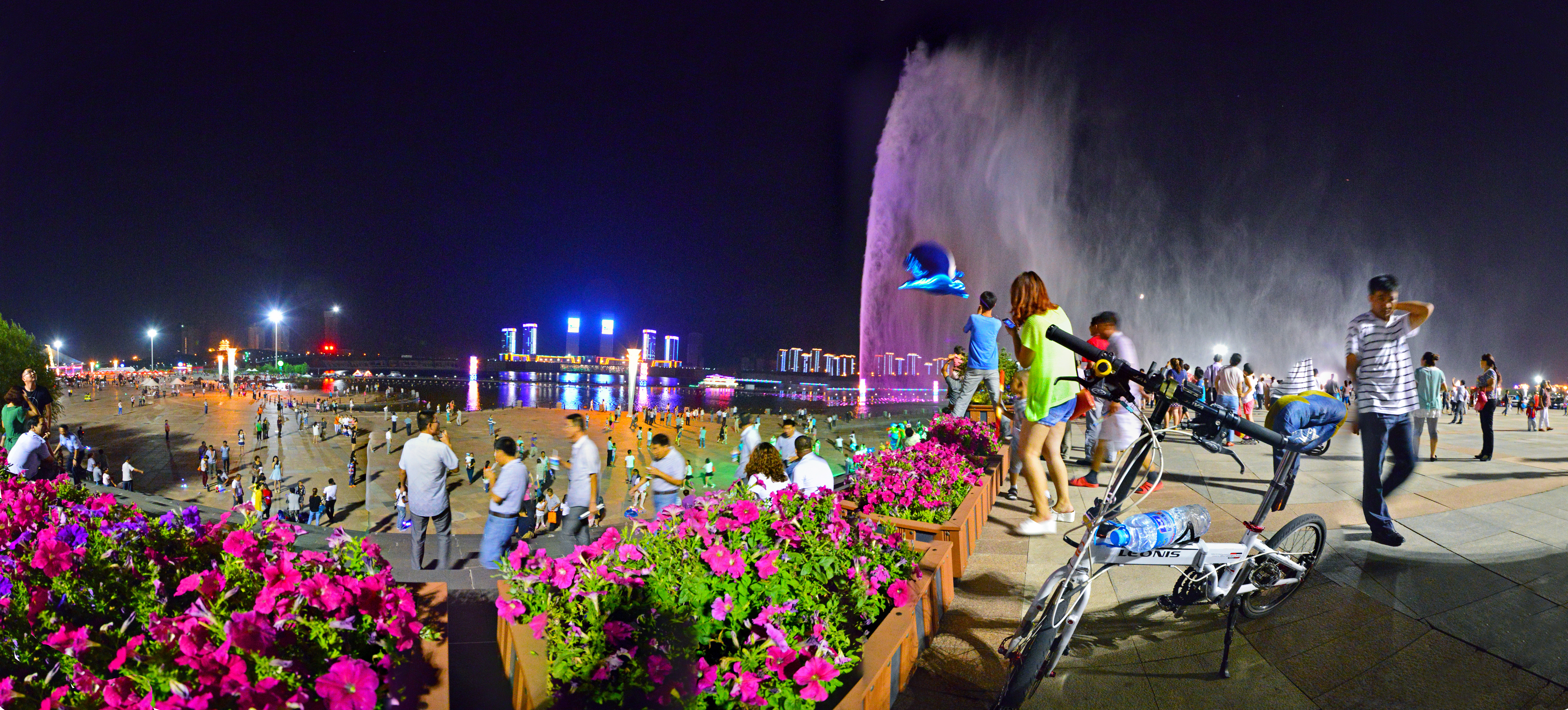
Music fountain on the south side of the artificial lake at Government Square, Kangbashi, Ordos.

A large, sparsely inhabited urban real estate development has been constructed 25 km (16 mi) from Dongsheng District. Intended to house a million people, it originally remained mostly uninhabited. Intended to have 300,000 residents by 2010, government figures stated it had 28,000 by that year. Several speculative publications, including an illustrated feature series by Al Jazeera's Melissa Chan in 2009, have depicted the city as a "ghost city." However, Wade Shepard, writing in Forbes in 2017, pointed out that this term was initially applied in 2009 when the city was only five years old with a population of 30,000. And that the population had surged to 153,000 and with housing prices rising by 50% since 2015, it became increasingly challenging to label it as such, and out of the 40,000 apartments built since 2004, only 500 remained on the market.

=== Ordos Museum ===
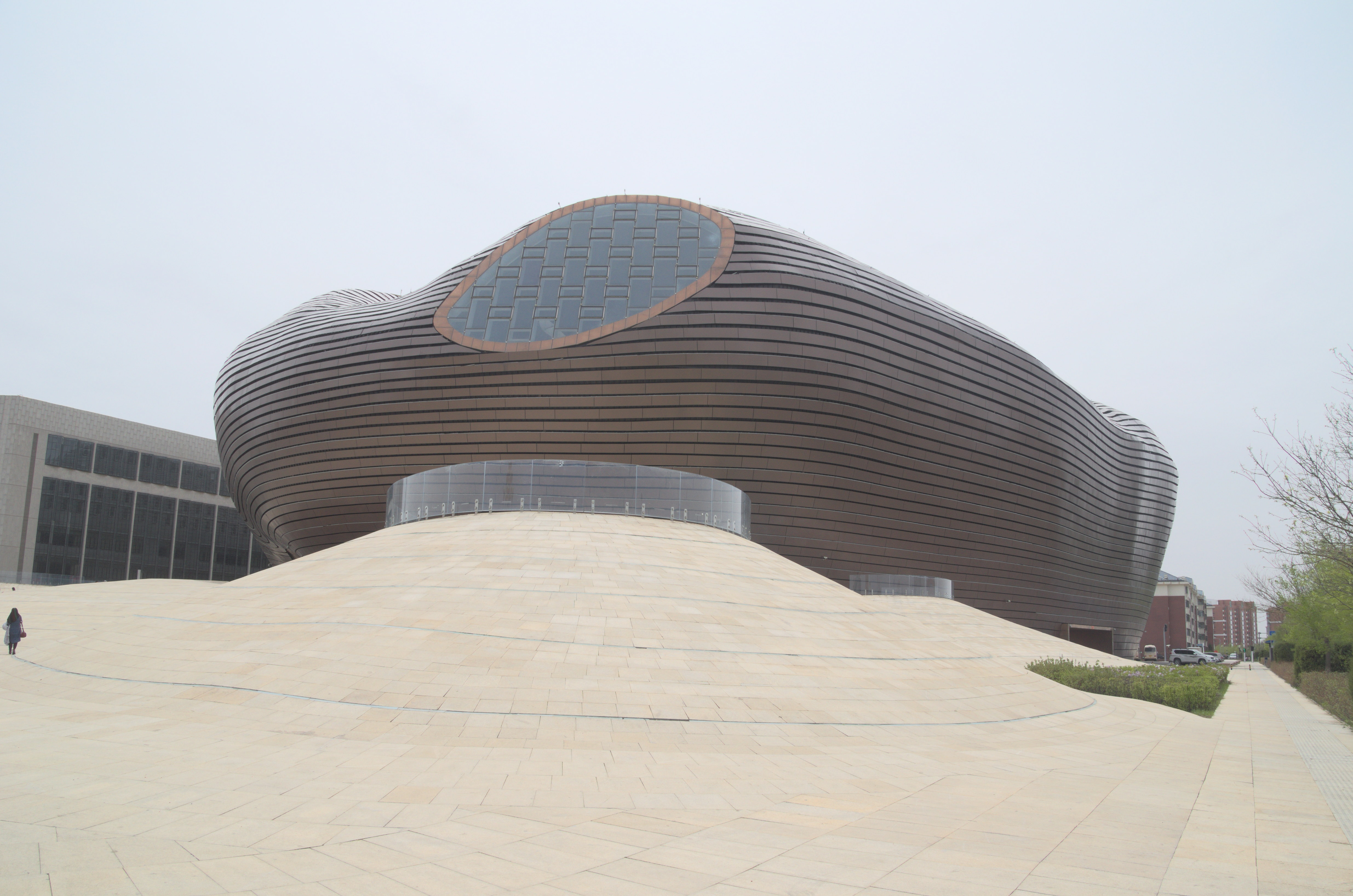
Ordos Museum

In 2011, a 41,000-square-foot museum, entitled Ordos Museum (Chinese: 鄂尔多斯博物馆), was opened in Kangbashi. The museum, designed by China-based architectural practice MAD Studio, focuses upon the history of the Ordos area, as well as on the culture and traditions of Inner Mongolia.

== Transportation ==
Travel within Ordos City is primarily made by car or bus, using the city's network roads. Two tolled expressways, the G18 Rongcheng–Wuhai Expressway and the G65 Baotou–Maoming Expressway, provide connections with other towns and cities including Dongsheng.

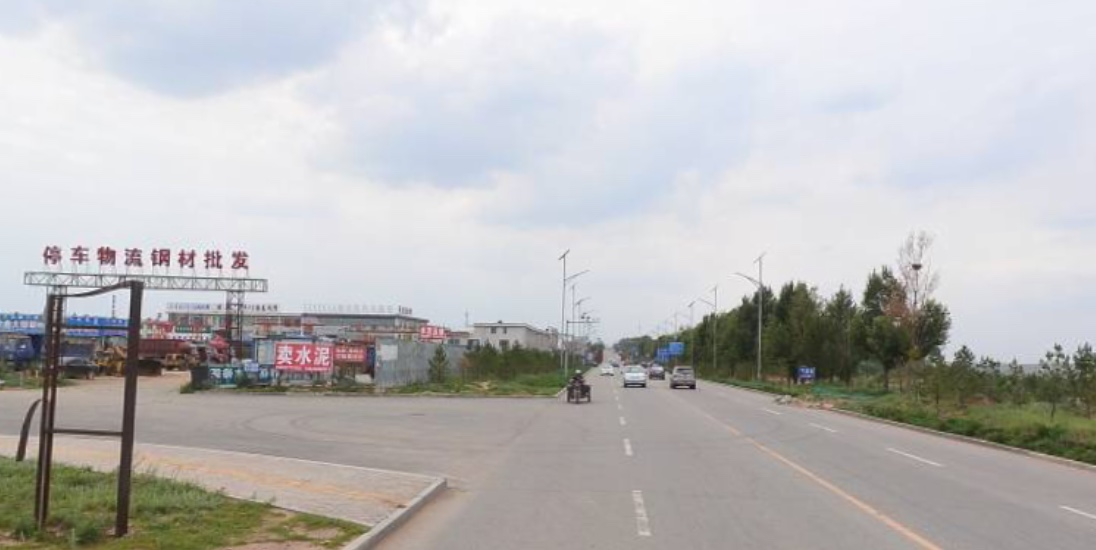
County Road X623 at Ejin Horo

In 2016, the Ordos railway station in the city opened. The station is on the Beijing-Baotou railway, the Hohhot-Ordos high-speed railway line, and the Baotou-West railway. High speed trains to the provincial capital of Hohhot are run on a daily basis. As well as slower speed trains directly to and from Beijing West railway station.

Ordos Ejin Horo International Airport is located in Ejin Horo Banner.

== Demographics ==
In the 2000 census, there were 1,369,766 inhabitants:

ethnic group	population	share
Han	1,207,971	88.19%
Mongols	155,845	11.38%
Manchu	2,905	0.21%
Hui	1,861	0.14%
Tibetans	1,023	0.07%

== See also ==
- List of top Chinese cities by GDP
- List of top Chinese cities by GDP per capita
- List of prefecture-level divisions of China by GDP
- List of cities in China by population
- Manhan folk song
- Mausoleum of Genghis Khan
- Ordos culture
- Ordos International Circuit
- Underoccupied developments in China
