= Australia Garden Village =

澳洲山莊
- Australia Garden Village
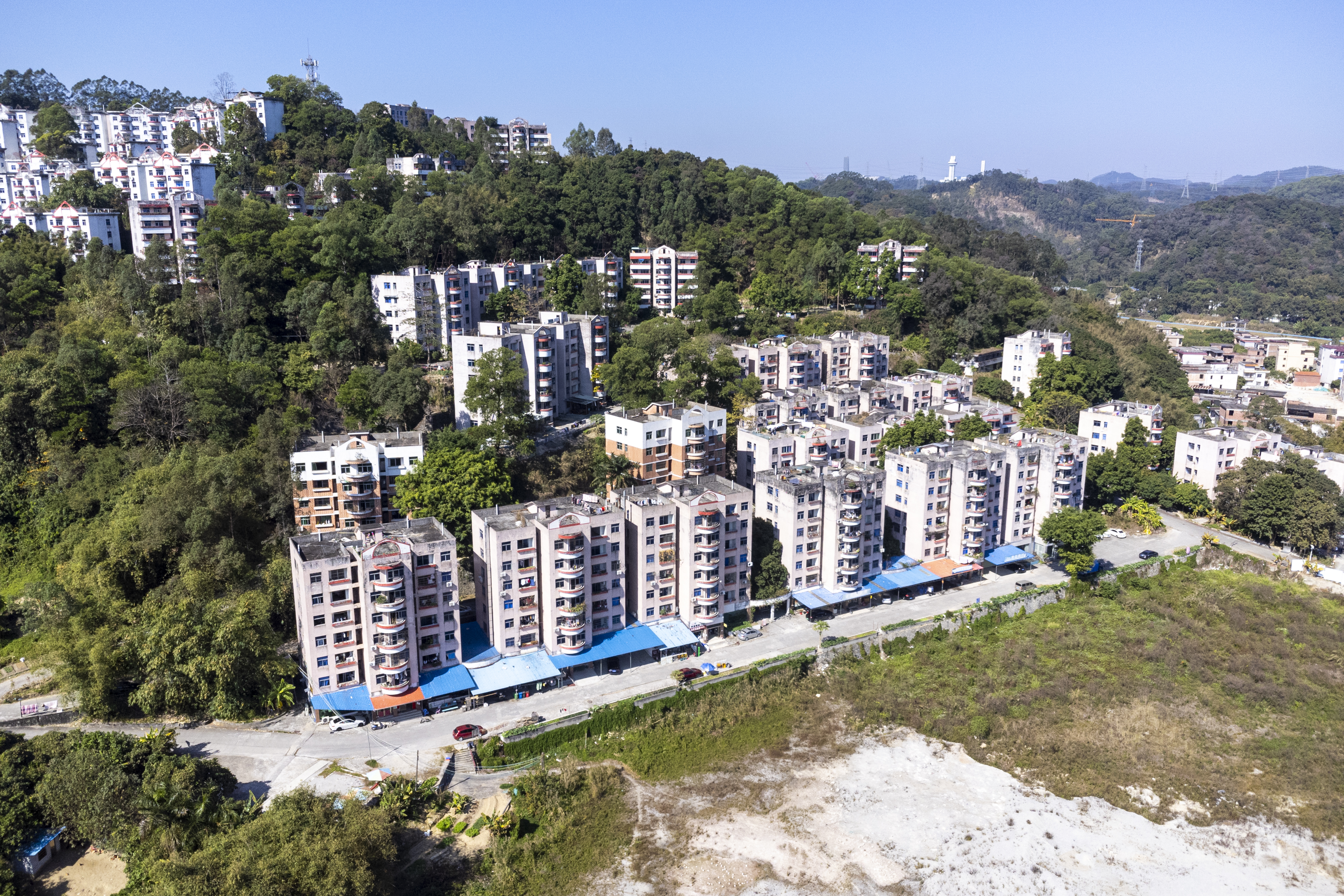
- Some buildings in the Australia Garden Village
- Interactive map of the 澳洲山莊 area

General information
- Status: The work has been stopped（Unfinished building）
- Location: Guangzhou, Guangdong Province, People's Republic of China
- Coordinates: 23.2558°N 113.5167°E
- Construction started: 1997
- Construction stopped: 1999

Australia Garden Village is a real estate development project located in Jinkeng Village, Xinlong Town, Huangpu District, Guangzhou, Guangdong Province, China. The project was developed by the Guangzhou Aomei Real Estate Development Company. Originally envisioned as a high-end residential complex combining living, leisure, entertainment, and vacation amenities, the development was planned to cover a construction area of 202,000 square metres (2,170,000 sq ft). Construction began in 1992, but the project was halted in 2001 due to a financial collapse within the Aomei Company, at which time only 225 of the 292 villas (or residential tower blocks) had been fully topped out and structurally completed.

In an effort to raise capital following the suspension of the project, the Aomei Company transferred, mortgaged, or sold portions of the land, housing units, and other assets of the development to Guangzhou Fangxing Real Estate Construction Co., Ltd. This led to the subdivision of the site and triggered land ownership disputes that are still ongoing. Fangxing subsequently sold part of the land to Guangzhou Yuhu Real Estate Development Co., Ltd., a subsidiary of Hutchison Whampoa, while Aomei introduced Guangdong Hongyu Group into negotiations, further entangling the ownership structure.

In 2011 and 2016, rumors circulated about plans to redevelop Australia Garden Village, but the land ownership conflicts prevented any re-commencement of development. In 2021, several departments of the Guangzhou Municipal Government issued a joint directive terminating the land transfer agreement between Aomei Company and Jinkeng Forestry Park. The termination was based on Aomei's unauthorized transfer of land to Fangxing, resulting in substantial losses of state-owned assets. This effectively marked the repossession of the Australia Garden Village site by the government. In November 2023, a representative of the homeowners reported that the district government would take the lead in redeveloping the site, with the intention of providing housing for buyers who had originally purchased unfinished units.

Since the collapse of Aomei Company's capital chain in 1998, Australia Garden Village has remained unfinished for over 25 years. The development is widely covered by media outlets, including Guangzhou Daily, Yangcheng Evening News, Chongqing Daily, and Ming Pao, as "the largest unfinished building project in Guangzhou". A total of 2,386 units were sold within the development. Of these, 865 contracts were eventually terminated, and another 139 units were suspended. The prolonged abandonment of the site has had a significant and lasting impact on the homeowners, many of whom have been engaged in rights defense efforts for more than two decades. The sustained efforts of Australia Garden Village's homeowners have drawn widespread attention and have been officially listed as a key destabilizing factor in major housing-related risk cases across Guangdong Province, as well as in municipal and district-level reports. According to data from the Homeowners' Committee, fewer than 300 owners remained actively involved in rights defense activities during the Mid-Autumn Festival in 2020.

== History ==
=== Planning and construction ===
In 1991, Chaoshan businessman Hu Yaozhi returned to China to invest and established a textile factory in Guangzhou through a Sino-foreign joint venture. Hu provided the capital, while the Guangzhou Economic and Technical Cooperation Office handled technical support and recruitment. Wu Kaiming, a fellow Chaoshan native and an employee of the Cooperation Office, later joined Hu's company as its designated Chinese representative.

In 1992, based on Wu Kaiming's recommendation, Hu Yaozhi purchased 10 plots of land totaling 986 mu (approximately 657,000 square meters) for the future development of Australia Garden Village. The land was acquired at a price of over 60,000 yuan per mu. Hu went on to invest around 200 million yuan to establish the Guangzhou Australia and America Real Estate Development Company. He appointed Wu Kaiming as deputy general manager and officially launched the Australia Garden Village project. During this period, Hu also secured a number of loans or issued loan guarantees through various banks to support the development.

Australia Garden Village was originally conceived as a high-end residential complex that integrated living, leisure, and entertainment. The planned construction area covered approximately 202,990 square feet and included amenities such as supermarkets, hotels, hunting grounds, entertainment centers, camping and training facilities, water resorts, and elite schools. The development comprised 292 buildings and thousands of commercial housing units, divided into zones A, B, C, D, EA, and a separate villa section.

In 1996, the Australian-American development company launched a major real estate advertising campaign in Guangzhou, featuring celebrity endorsements to promote the "Australia Garden Village" project. At the time, units were priced at around 3,000 yuan per square meter, marketed with the concept of a natural, pollution-free vacation lifestyle. To accelerate sales, the company offered a special payment plan: interest-free installments over 20 years, with a down payment of 38,000 yuan and monthly payments of just 488 yuan. By November 1997, approximately 1,800 units had been sold; by 1998, that number had grown to over 2,000. In total, more than 3,000 homes were eventually sold. Of these, 2,483 buyers had their purchase information verified, registered, and filed with government regulatory authorities. However, around 1,000 owners had yet to complete registration. According to another set of official data, a total of 2,386 units were sold, with 865 contracts later terminated and 139 suspended.

=== Broken capital chain ===
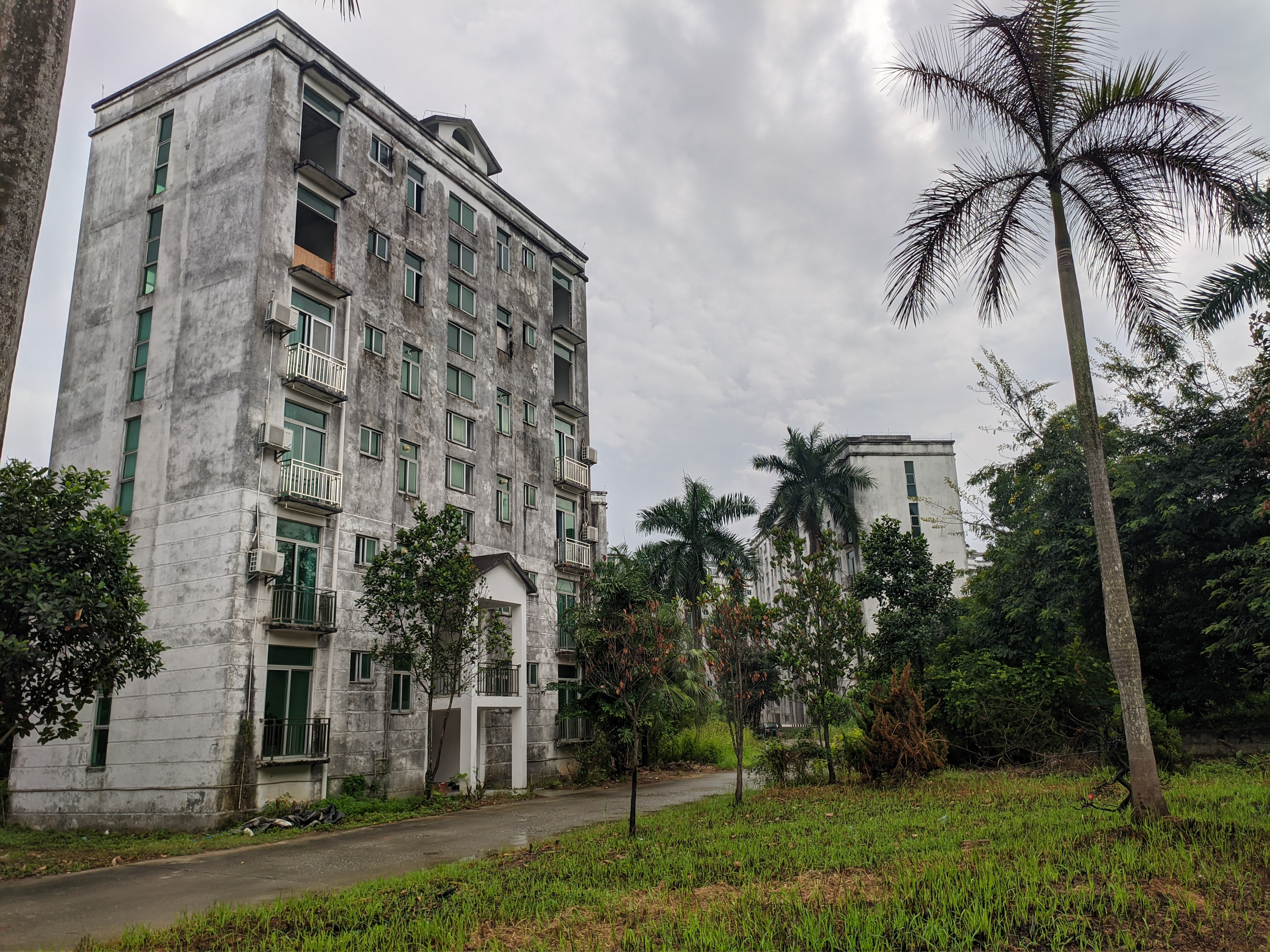
The building in Area B of Australia Villa shows that its frame and exterior walls have been completed, and the exterior facade is halfway completed.

In 1998, Hu Yaozhi alleged that the financial director of the Australia-America Company, Mr. He, had embezzled a significant portion of the pre-sale funds collected from homeowners. He reportedly used numerous legal documents in his possession to take out large loans in the company's name, ultimately misappropriating around 120 million yuan before fleeing with the funds. This created a severe financial shortfall for the company. In the second half of 1998, the Australia-America Company sent a letter to homeowners, encouraging them to apply for mortgage loans through banks and transfer the loan proceeds to the company. The company promised to cover the interest on these loans. Despite this effort, its financial difficulties only deepened. By late 1998, construction on parts of the Australia Garden Village project had come to a halt. Services such as the shuttle bus to and from Guangzhou East Station were canceled, and several facilities—including a floating restaurant, a Western-style restaurant, and a hotel—were shut down. By 1999, construction work had nearly come to a complete standstill. In September 2000, the company ceased paying interest on the homeowners' loans.

Some homeowners offered differing perspectives on the causes of the company's financial collapse. One owner, Lao Yue, recalled that even before the Australia-America Company claimed the He brothers had absconded with funds, construction in Area C of the Australia Garden Village project had already been suspended for six months. During that time, real estate agents aggressively promoted units in Areas EA and A, which had yet to be built. According to Lao Yue, construction in Area C resumed only after all the units had been sold. He also estimated that approximately 1,800 homeowners had purchased their units using mortgages, with interest payments alone accounting for 60% to 80% of the total loan amounts. As a result, the company was required to make substantial monthly payments to the bank. Another owner, Liu Yongguang, speculated that the Australia-America Company had used funds from later sales to finance the construction of earlier phases of the project—a practice that may have ultimately triggered the company's cash flow crisis.

Around the year 2000, the Australia-America Company handed over several homes to owners despite the fact that they were not actually ready for occupancy. These units had failed fire safety inspections, lacked proper infrastructure, and were ineligible for property certificates. Many also suffered from serious quality issues, including water leakage, uneven walls, and faulty doors and windows. As a result, only about 30 homeowners chose to renovate and move in. That same year, due to severe financial difficulties, all construction at the Australia Garden Village project came to a complete halt. At the time, the development consisted of approximately 292 buildings—225 of which had been topped out and structurally completed, while the remaining 67 were still under construction or left unfinished. Many homeowners, unable to take possession of their properties and still burdened with mortgage loans, filed lawsuits against the Australia-America Company in an effort to protect their rights. Company founder Hu Yaozhi was repeatedly listed as a dishonest debtor by the authorities.

=== Disposal of land to raise new capital ===
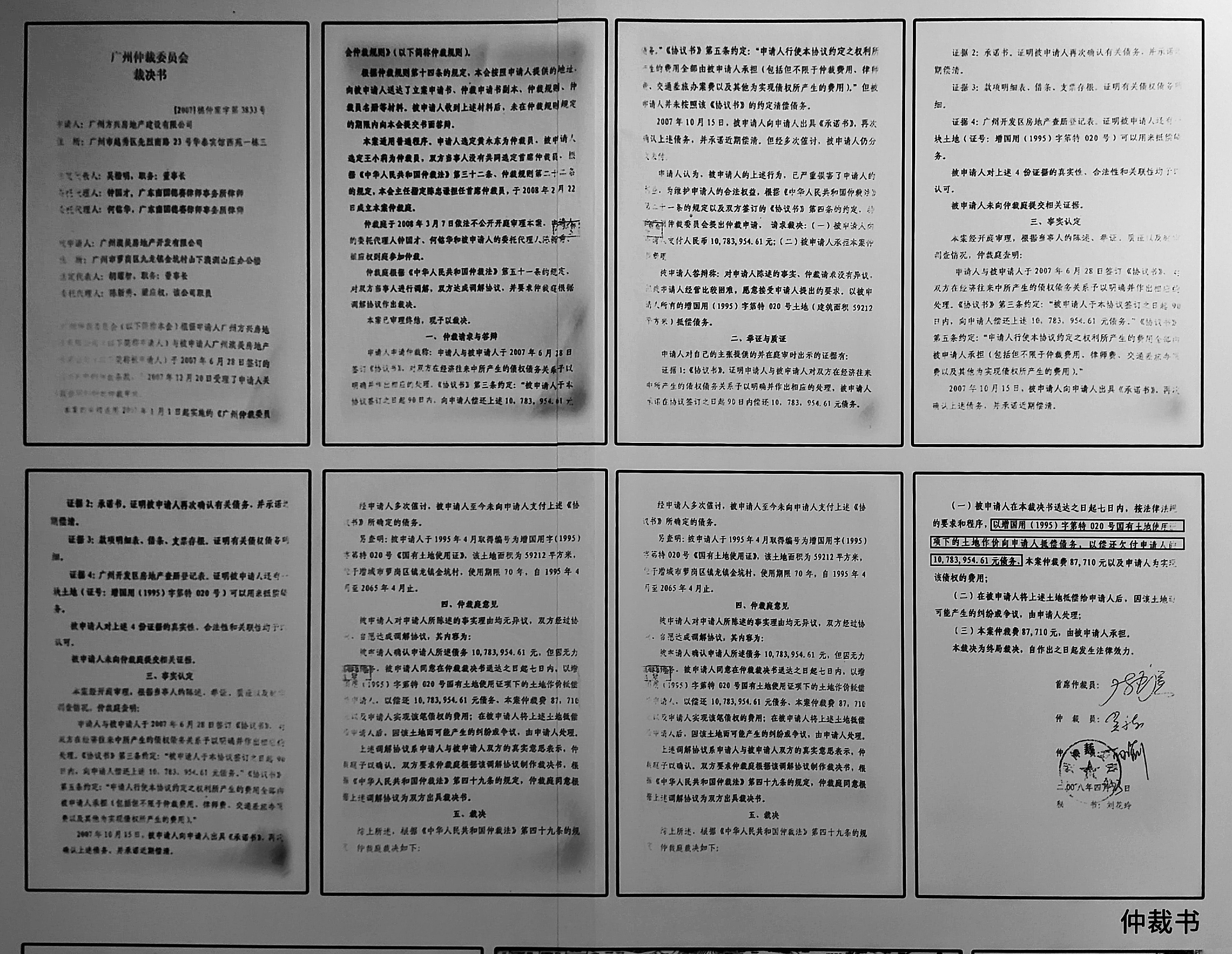
In April 2008, the arbitration document on the transfer of the land of Australia Villa 020 from Australia America Company to Fangxing Company.

In the years that followed, the Australia-America Company sought partnerships with several major developers in hopes of reviving the Australia Garden Village project. In 2003, Hu Yaozhi nearly reached an agreement with a real estate developer, but the deal ultimately fell through. The reasons for the failed contract were disputed by Hu and his associate Wu Kaiming. According to Hu, Wu believed the developer was not a suitable partner. However, Wu claimed the deal collapsed because Hu was unhappy with a last-minute reduction in the proposed purchase price.

In 2004, in an effort to resolve its financial difficulties, the Australia-America Company (Aomei Company) transferred four land use certificates—Zengguoyong (1995) No. 018, No. 022, No. 024, and No. 026—covering a total of 340 mu of land, to Fangxing Company. According to Hu Yaozhi, the transfer was initiated at the request of Wu Kaiming, who aimed to facilitate a potential partnership with Cheung Kong Industries. To demonstrate goodwill, Wu reportedly lent Hu a sum of money to cover utility bills and employee wages. However, the two sides offered differing accounts regarding the land transfer price. Wu Kaiming stated that the land was sold at 38,000 and 50,000 yuan per mu, while Hu Yaozhi claimed the agreed price was 300,000 yuan per mu. Public records show that three contracts signed on 23 December 2004, listed prices of 38,000 yuan and 50,000 yuan per mu, while a contract signed on 30 December 2004, listed the price as 300,000 yuan per mu, with a total transaction amount of 102 million yuan. This figure matches the amount reported in the 2007 local tax return filed by the Australia-America Company.

In 2005, Fangxing Company proposed to Aomei that it be granted the rights to operate three land parcels, including "Land No. 017." In February 2006, Cheung Kong Holdings and Hutchison Whampoa—both owned by Li Ka-shing—jointly announced a partnership with Fangxing to form a joint venture company for the development of four residential plots in Guangzhou. That same year, Guangzhou Fuding Industrial Company was established as a representative entity for the cooperation between Aomei and Fangxing. The company had a registered capital of 3 million yuan. Wu Kaiming's spouse, Zhong Kezhi, and Hu Yaozhi's associate, Jiang Datong, each held 50% of the shares. Additionally, Hu Yaozhi and Jiang Datong signed an agreement stating that Hu was the company's actual investor.

In 2007, the two companies jointly fabricated a creditor-debtor relationship and divided a fictitious debt supposedly owed by the Australia-America Company into three separate items. Through three arbitration cases, they arranged to “repay” the debt by transferring three parcels of land—Zeng Guoyong (1995) No. 017, No. 020, and No. 021—whose combined market value at the time was estimated at 900 million yuan. Under the agreement, land parcels No. 020 and No. 021 were transferred, while the transfer of No. 017 was temporarily put on hold. According to Hu Yaozhi, this was because there were no buildings on that parcel, making it suitable for future resettlement housing. Meanwhile, loans taken out by the Australia-America Company became non-performing due to the project's long-standing suspension and inability to generate revenue. These bad debts were later acquired by China Cinda Asset Management Co., Ltd.

Following these events, the remaining land registered under Aomei Company included Zeng Guoyong (1995) No. 019, No. 023, part of No. 021, and Sui Fu Guoyong (2012) No. 05000135, totaling approximately 278.71 mu. Most of this land was located in the mountainous area and had existing buildings. In contrast, Fangxing Company held 370.93 mu of land, situated at the foot of the mountain.

=== Hopes of re-commencement ===
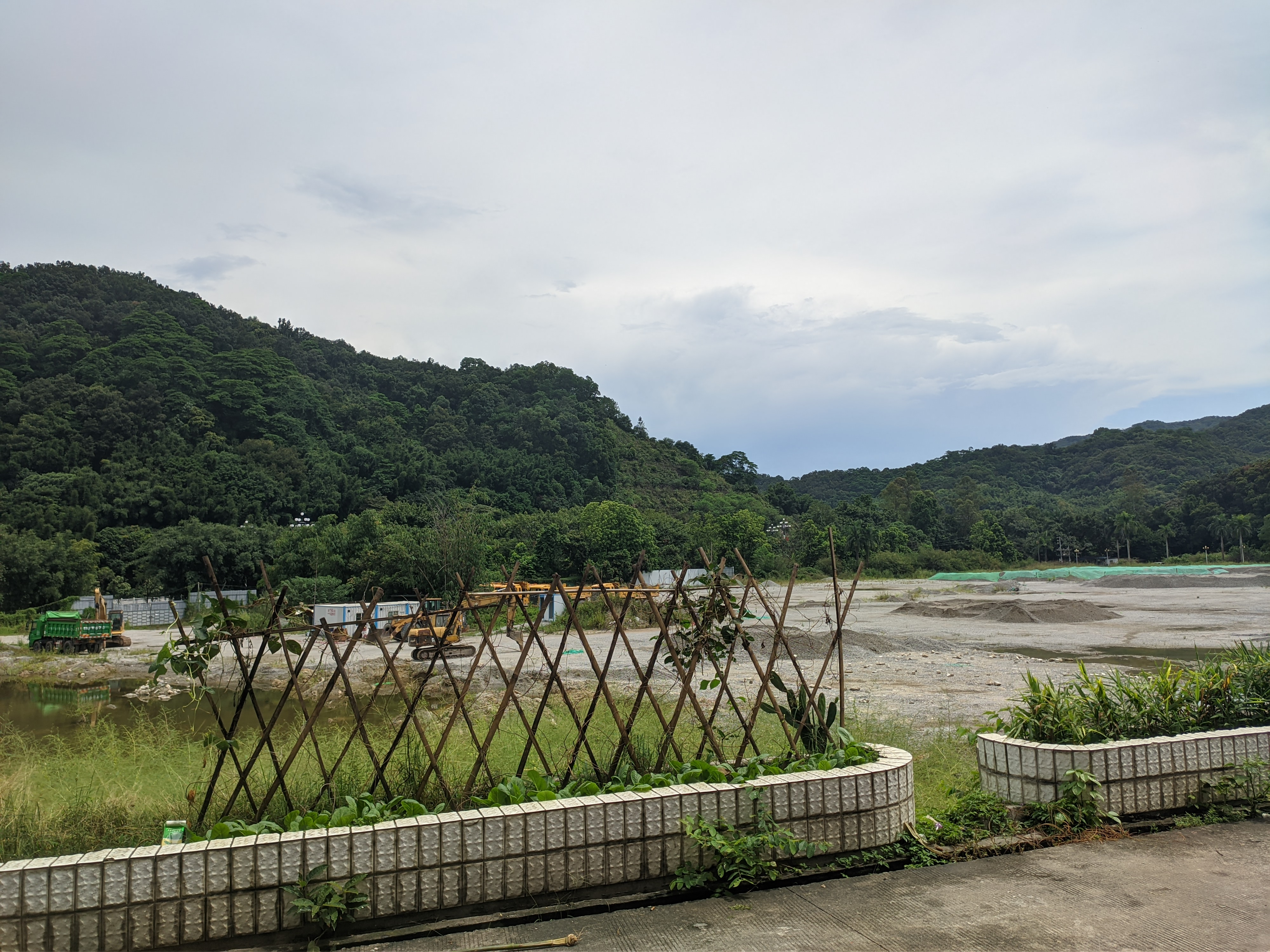
The land of Australia Villa 0021 is close to the highway and has a relatively flat terrain.

In 2011, there were reports that Li Ka-shing's Cheung Kong Holdings and Hutchison Whampoa would take over the redevelopment of the site. Some buildings in the EA section of the Australia Garden Village project were subsequently demolished. However, in the end, only the hillside on the south side of Jinkeng Reservoir and the mountaintop park area—both provided by Fangxing Company—were leveled to construct the Royal Lake Residence. The remaining buildings within the Australia Garden Village development were left untouched, and the rumored relocation plan ultimately did not materialize.

On 20 February 2013, Zhong Kezhi and Jiang Datong transferred their shares in Fuding Company to Wu Kaiming and Tan Jianqiang, a subordinate of Wu. Wu Kaiming stated that he agreed to the share transfer in order to withdraw from the project, citing Hu Yaozhi's lack of funds and advanced age. Hu, on the other hand, said he stepped back from the project because he trusted Wu. In March 2013, the Guangzhou Municipal Special Task Force for Handling “Unfinished Buildings” held its second plenary meeting and reviewed the Australia Villa Revitalization and Reconstruction Work Plan. According to the plan, most of the buildings in the project had remained unfinished for over a decade, posing safety risks due to prolonged neglect. Many of the constructed buildings lacked complete application materials and had been built without proper planning approvals. They failed to meet fire safety standards and could not obtain real estate certificates, making it impossible to complete the necessary legal procedures. To resolve these issues, the Australia-America Company brought in Fangxing Company and its subsidiary, Fuding Company, as development partners to address the funding shortfall. The plan proposed using 100,000 square meters of undeveloped land near Guangshan Road to create a start-up zone, with an estimated 300,000 square meters of residential and supporting commercial facilities. Non-compliant buildings would be demolished and rebuilt. Fangxing committed to using the housing and financial resources from this project for phased development. Aomei Company would be responsible for signing demolition and resettlement agreements with all homeowners. For those who did not consent to the demolition and reconstruction plan, their homes would be preserved in their current state. In cases where owners could not be contacted, equivalent-sized housing units would be reserved for them in the new start-up zone. In December 2013, China Cinda Asset Management sold a package of non-performing assets valued at approximately 146 million yuan to Guangdong Zhihua Development Co., Ltd. for 30.5 million yuan.

In 2015, the two development companies—Aomei and Fangxing (through its subsidiary Fuding)—jointly submitted a detailed master plan for the reconstruction of the Australia Garden Village project to the land and planning authorities. The Guangzhou Development Zone and the Huangpu District Bureau of Land Resources and Urban Planning reviewed the proposal and issued Planning Letter No. 140, approving the implementation of relevant zoning controls and community public facilities. On 30 October, hundreds of homeowners returned to the Australia Garden Village site. At the gathering, Hu Yaozhi, chairman of Aomei, announced that Ping An Real Estate had been brought in as a new partner and would invest 2.5 billion yuan into the demolition and redevelopment of the project. Hu promised that homeowners would be able to move into their new residences within two years.

In March 2016, the Guangzhou Development Zone and the Huangpu District Bureau of Land and Resources and Urban Planning held a coordination meeting with the two development entities and homeowner representatives to address longstanding issues related to the Australia Garden Village project. At the meeting, all parties agreed to move forward with construction in accordance with Planning Letter No. 140. It was also agreed that the Australia-America Company would take the lead in the first phase of development, beginning with “Land No. 017.” Since no buildings had previously been constructed on Land No. 017, it was identified as the quickest and most convenient site to begin redevelopment. The plan called for the construction of approximately 11 residential buildings on this parcel, intended to house more than 1,000 homeowners.

=== Land ownership disputes ===
Subsequently, a series of disputes arose between Aomei and Fangxing, involving both funding and land ownership issues. Each party sought to protect its own interests through legal action, resulting in the suspension of the reconstruction plan.

In May 2016, Wu Kaiming filed an application with the court to resume the compulsory transfer of “Land No. 017.” According to a Letter to Owners issued by Aomei Company and signed by Hu Yaozhi, Hu had personally raised all the construction funds for Land No. 017 and had already completed site leveling in preparation for development. However, in August 2016, the Guangzhou Development Zone and Huangpu District Bureau of Land Resources and Urban Planning announced that, according to judicial documents issued by the Huangpu District Court, Aomei had lost the land use rights to Land No. 017, which had been designated as part of the reconstruction start-up area. As a result, the company no longer had the legal or factual basis to serve as the developer for that parcel. The two parties provided differing explanations for the land transfer application. Wu Kaiming argued that the ownership of the land needed to be unified to facilitate development and claimed that Hu Yaozhi's introduction of new shareholders had prompted him to transfer the land in order to protect his own interests. In contrast, Hu Yaozhi insisted that Wu had previously promised not to transfer Land No. 017 until the reconstruction was completed and accused him of breaching that agreement.

According to the company register, in March 2016, Hu Yaozhi transferred 2.375 million shares of Hong Kong Aomei—representing 25% of the company's total share capital—to a subsidiary of Guangdong Hongyu Group. In October 2016, he transferred an additional 5.225 million shares to the same subsidiary, reducing his own stake to 20%. Although Hu Yaozhi denied that Hongyu Group was a new partner he had brought into the project, more than three homeowners of the Australia Garden Village development reported that representatives from Hongyu Group had participated in meetings with residents, speaking on behalf of the Australia Garden Village project.

In 2017, the Huangpu District government of Guangzhou established a special task force to address the long-standing issues surrounding the unfinished Australia Garden Village project. The office of the task force was set up within the Political and Legal Affairs Committee of the Huangpu District Committee, and was tasked with monitoring and advancing progress on the redevelopment. In June 2018, the former Land and Resources and Planning Bureau of the Guangzhou Development Zone and the former Land and Resources and Planning Bureau of Huangpu District jointly issued a Reply to the Petition on the Stagnation of the Revitalization and Reconstruction of Australia Garden Village, addressed to residents Song Wei and Zhang Lingfeng. The reply recommended that Aomei Company and Fangxing Company (via its subsidiary, Fuding Company) each select land parcels under their respective ownership that had clear legal titles and favorable development conditions. They were instructed to prepare the necessary documentation and apply for a Construction Project Planning Permit on a per-building basis, and to complete the required approvals related to fire safety, environmental protection, and housing before commencing construction. However, no specific land parcel meeting these conditions had been identified at the time. In August 2018, Zhihua Development Co., Ltd. sold an asset package to Fangxing Company for 30.5 million yuan, resulting in Fangxing acquiring three outstanding debts owed by Aomei Company. Due to Aomei's failure to repay the debts, Fangxing applied to have the remaining four land parcels under Aomei's ownership frozen. As of now, all land assets associated with Hu Yaozhi remain under judicial seizure. In January 2019, Aomei Company attempted to use Land No. 021 for homeowner resettlement, but was informed that the land had been frozen and could not proceed through the necessary formalities.

Aomei Company later claimed that the 2007 arbitration case was invalid and argued that the land acquired by Fangxing Company without compensation should be returned. However, in July 2019, the Guangdong Provincial High People's Court issued a final ruling stating that Aomei's allegations regarding the false arbitration lacked legal merit and would not be upheld. On 6 January 2020, the Guangzhou Arbitration Commission also responded, confirming that arbitration cases No. 995, No. 3833, and No. 2829 had all followed proper legal procedures, including filing, service, defense, submission of evidence, cross-examination, hearings, and deliberations, and thus could not be deemed false or procedurally invalid. On 12 August 2019, Fangxing Company filed a petition with the Guangzhou Intermediate People's Court seeking the bankruptcy liquidation of Aomei Company. A hearing was held on 2 September, during which Aomei pledged to the judicial panel that it could repay the full amount owed within 15 days of the debt being officially determined. Fangxing, however, insisted on proceeding with the bankruptcy application. Subsequently, Aomei transferred 16 million yuan to the court's designated account. On 6 December 2019, the Guangzhou Intermediate People's Court ruled that Fangxing had failed to provide sufficient evidence to confirm the exact amount of Aomei's debt. Later, on 28 April 2020, the Guangdong Higher People's Court ruled that there was insufficient factual basis to support the bankruptcy liquidation case against Aomei, and the application was dismissed.

In November 2019, a homeowner at the Australia Garden Village development discovered a discrepancy while checking the property register: the area listed under Land Certificate No. 021 had been reduced from 122,000 square meters to 89,000 square meters, with 33,000 square meters of land unaccounted for. Fangxing Company had previously purchased four parcels of land—Nos. 018, 022, 024, and 026—from the Australia-America Company. While the total area of these four parcels remained unchanged after the transfer, their boundaries and geographic coordinates had been altered. As a result of these adjustments, some homeowners were left in a situation where their houses no longer sat on land legally registered under their names—either the land beneath their homes had been reclassified, or the legal land certificate no longer matched the actual location of the buildings. Fangxing Company explained that, during the transfer process, the Australia-America Company was unable to locate certain homeowners and therefore excluded approximately 50 mu of land that had existing buildings, transferring only the remaining 134 mu to Fangxing. According to an official government response, the cancellation of the two affected land parcels was conducted “in accordance with laws and regulations.” Nevertheless, some homeowners who had already taken possession of their properties discovered that the land beneath their homes had been deregistered, making it impossible to obtain property certificates. To date, of the ten original land parcels owned by Aomei within the Australia Garden Village project, seven undeveloped parcels have been transferred to Fangxing, while the remaining three—containing existing buildings—remain under court-imposed seizure.

=== Government reclaims land ===
On 8 May 2021, the Guangzhou Development Zone Planning and Natural Resources Bureau, the Huangpu Branch of the Guangzhou Planning and Natural Resources Bureau, and the Huangpu Jinkeng Forest Farm jointly issued a Contract Termination Notice to Guangzhou Aome Real Estate Development Co., Ltd. The notice stated that Aomei Company had, without proper approval or filing by the contracting authority, unilaterally transferred 388.732 mu of land within the contract scope to a third party—Fangxing Company—for development. This action was deemed to have caused a significant loss of state-owned assets. The land in question comprised four plots that Hu Yaozhi had sold to Fangxing in earlier years for the development of the Yuhu Mansion project. As a result of this breach of contract, the land transfer agreement between Aomei and the Jinkeng Forest Farm was terminated. The Jinkeng Forest Farm announced it would resume independent operation and management of the land, and Aomei was ordered to withdraw from the area. On 18 November 2022, the Huangpu District Housing and Urban-Rural Development Bureau issued a tender notice for the Australia Garden Village Housing Safety Assessment Project. The project called for a third-party agency to conduct building-by-building inspections of 193 existing structures, assess the extent of damage, and determine the structural safety level of each unit in accordance with national standards for structural appraisal. The assessment was to include a comprehensive summary of the community's condition and provide professional recommendations for further action. The project was scheduled for completion by the end of November. In September 2023, 32 houses in the Australia Garden Village project were listed for public auction on the Judicial Auction Network by the Yuexiu District People's Court. The court noted that the properties had not yet received property ownership certificates, had not passed construction inspections, lacked water and electricity connections, and were therefore not ready for occupancy. The court did not guarantee the quality of the properties or the issuance of property certificates, but committed to ensuring the handover of the physical site and managing pre-sale transfer registrations upon successful auction. However, none of the properties offered in this round of auctions were successfully sold.

In November 2023, a homeowner representative relayed information from a source within the Huangpu District Government indicating that the district government would take the lead in the redevelopment of the Australia Garden Village project. In July 2024, the Huangpu District Leading Group Office for Handling the Unfinished Australia Garden Village Problem issued a public notice calling for submissions from original homeowners and other rights holders involved in the purchase of properties within the Australia Garden Village development. On 30 July 2024, the Huangpu District Government put a nearby 50,000-square-meter parcel of state-owned construction land up for sale. It was widely believed that this land would be used to accommodate resettlement housing for owners affected by the long-delayed project. On 30 August, the parcel was acquired by the Knowledge City Group, a development entity under the Huangpu District.

In April 2025, construction officially began on the Australian Hills Resettlement Housing Project. The resettlement units are designed to offer a housing area 1.1 times larger than the original homes and are intended to accommodate 1,342 households. According to government statements, the resettlement housing is specifically aimed at addressing the basic housing needs of affected Australia Garden Village homeowners—what officials described as resolving the “survival rights issue” of buyers. However, approximately 700 homeowners who had successfully filed lawsuits in earlier years to terminate their purchase contracts—but had not recovered their down payments—remain ineligible to apply for the resettlement housing.

== Building and infrastructure conditions in 2025 ==
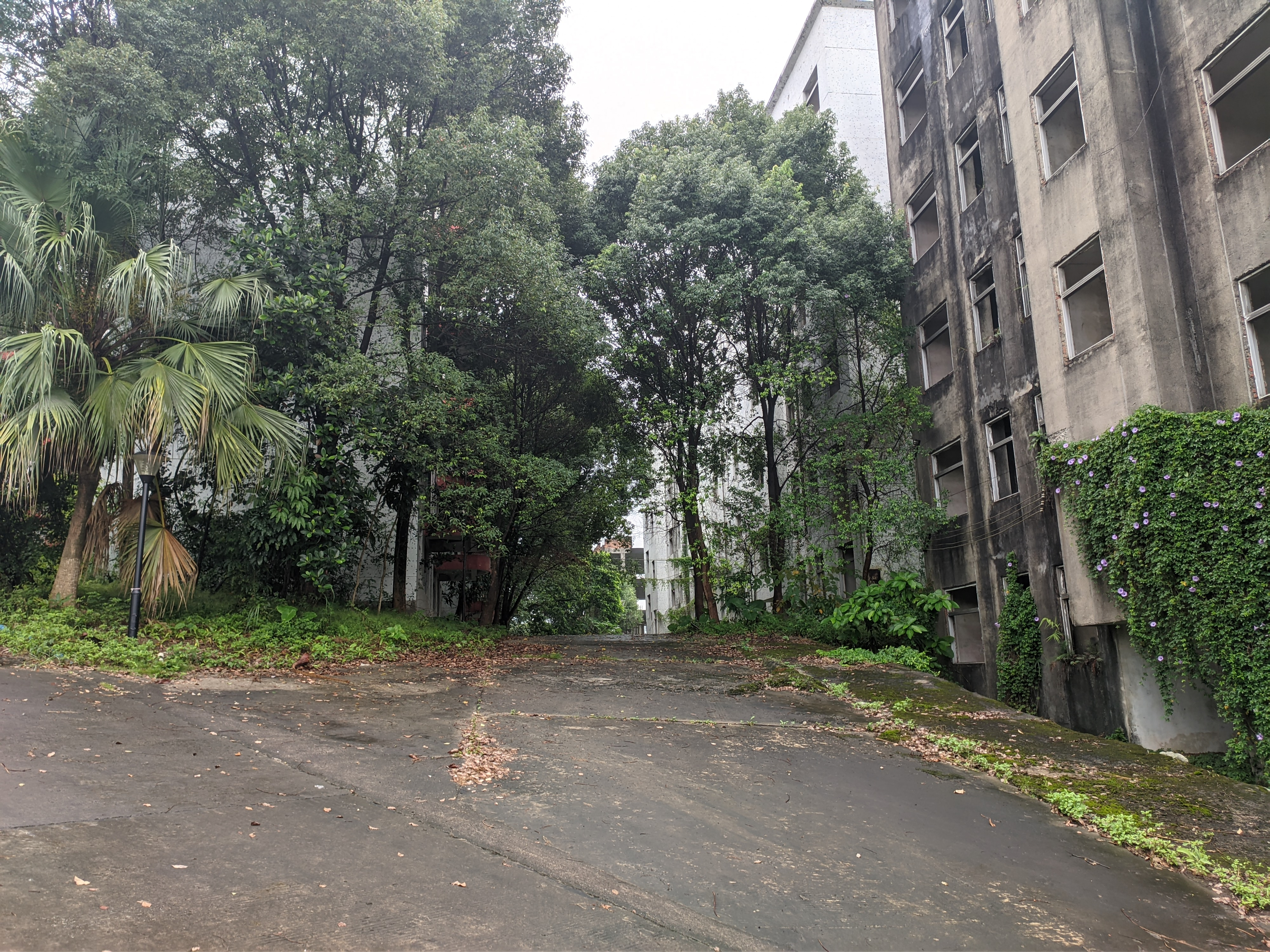
Area C of Australia Villa, where some buildings are still in rough condition.

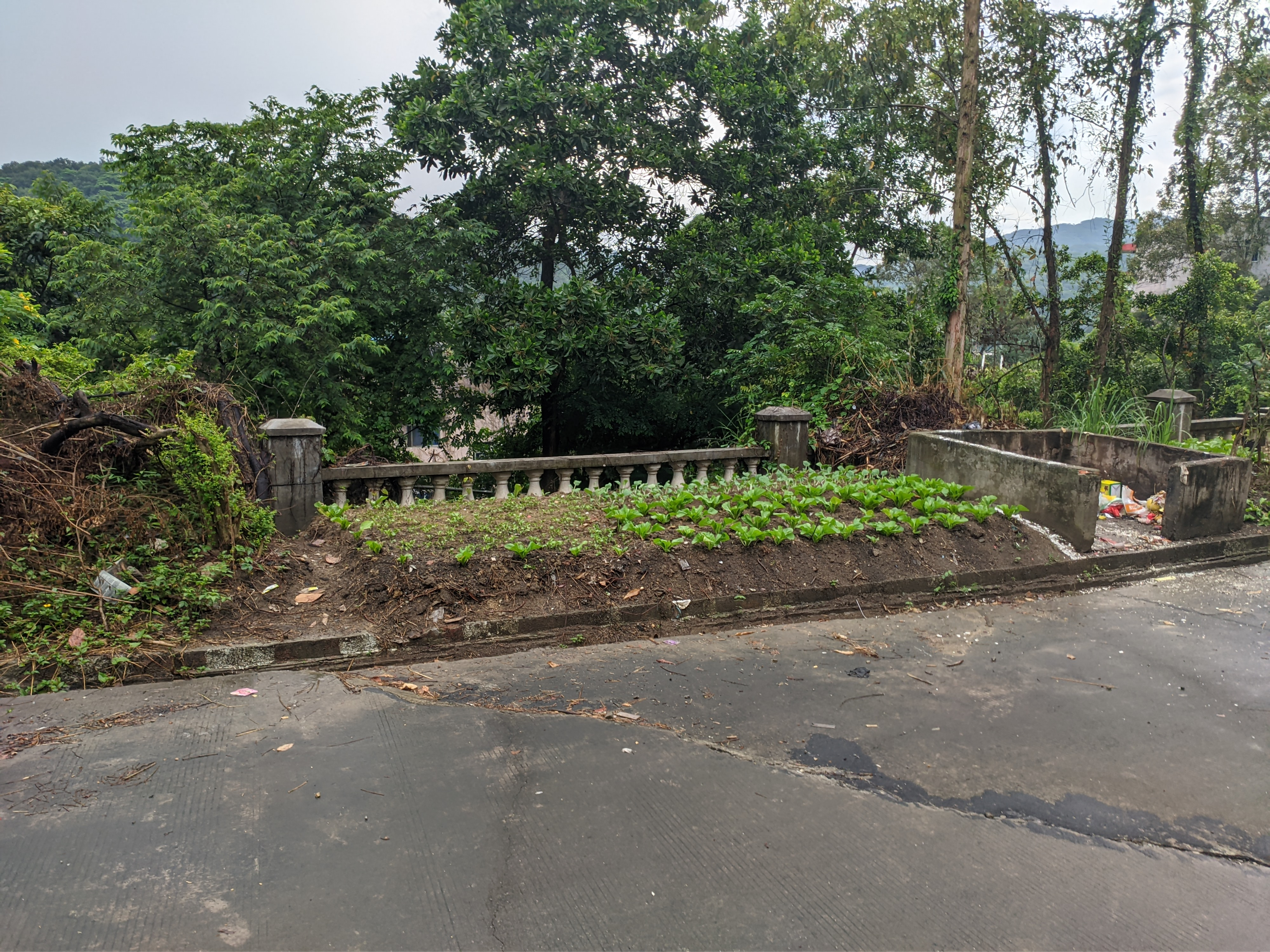
Some owners living in the villa grow vegetables.

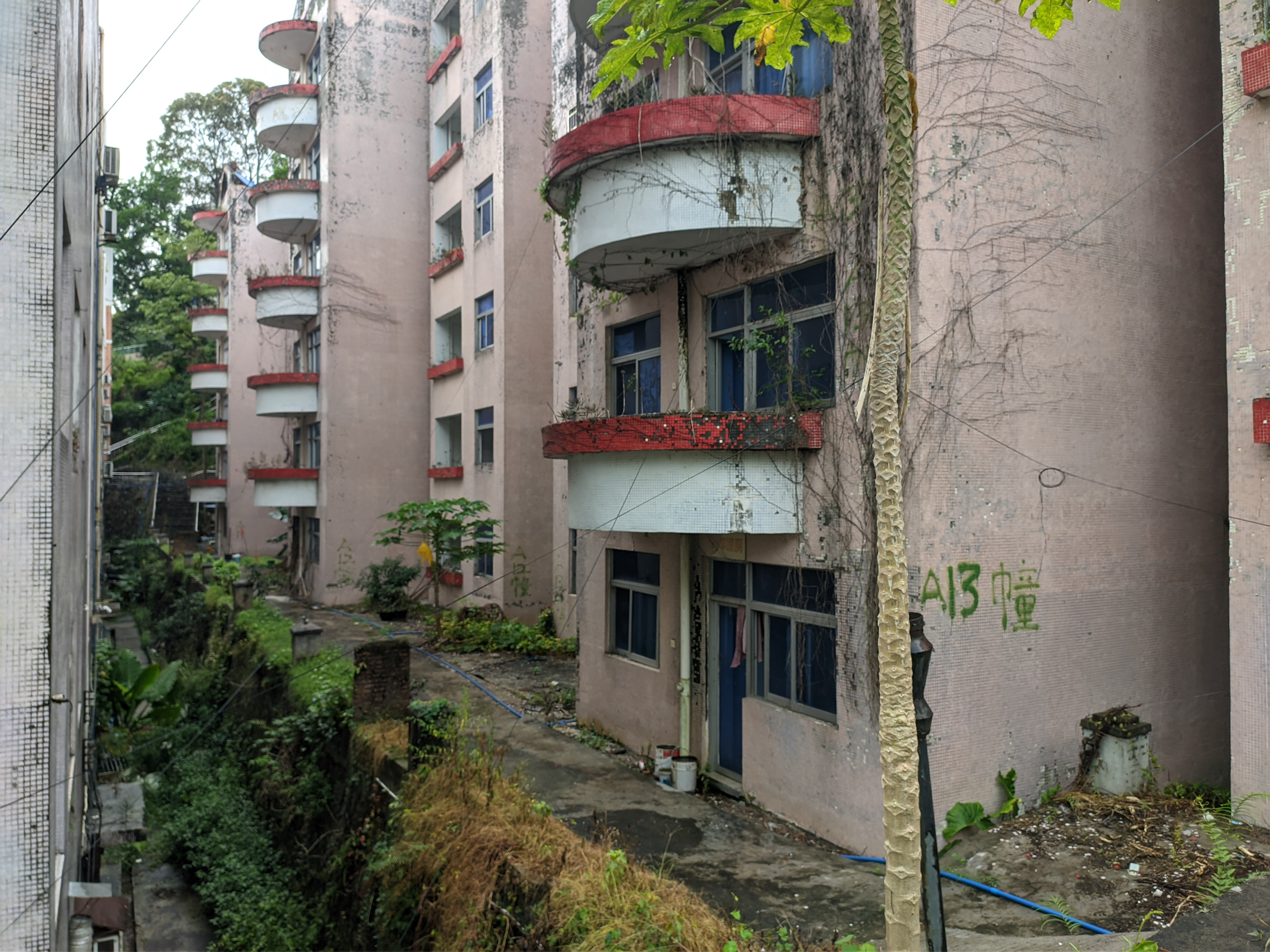
Due to lack of maintenance, the mosaics on the exterior walls of the villa buildings fell off.

Due to longstanding funding and property rights disputes, the Australia Garden Village project remains unfinished. The once-ambitious development is now largely deserted, with only a few security guards stationed at the rusted iron gates, questioning anyone entering or leaving the premises. With few residents and no formal property management, the area suffers from poor infrastructure and inadequate services. Water and electricity costs are high, and there is no access to gas. Electricity voltage is unstable, water outages occur weekly, and television signals are often lost during typhoons.

Although there was some improvement in water and electricity services beginning in 2022, these utilities remain unreliable. The lack of management has also led to vandalism and theft— many renovated units have been stripped of fixtures and furnishings, turning once “finely decorated homes” into empty, damaged shells. Most homes are infested with termites; furniture has rotted, doors and windows are broken, and mosaics on exterior walls are falling off. Weeds have overtaken courtyards, water pipes are severely corroded, and dark red liquid has been observed leaking from them. Part of the mountain behind the development has been fenced off and repurposed as a chicken farm. Basic services are lacking: food delivery is difficult to arrange within several kilometers, and courier packages can only be dropped off at the front gate. The nearest supermarket is approximately five kilometers away.

Area A of the Australia Garden Village complex has the highest number of residents. In contrast, many buildings in Areas C, D, and EA remain in an unfinished or rough condition—some structures consist only of a basic concrete frame, while others exhibit structural issues such as honeycombing in the concrete.

The actual controller of Aomei Company has reportedly continued to live within the complex. However, due to years of abandonment, many buildings in the area have become makeshift shelters for local homeless individuals.

In late 2017, renovation work began in the nearby Jinkeng Village. After the second half of 2019, the opening of a nearby metro line and the demolition of several adjacent villages prompted some displaced villagers to rent livable units in the villa, particularly those with functioning water and electricity. A few homeowners also began utilizing open spaces near their buildings to grow vegetables, papayas, and other crops. Occasionally, staff from Aomei Company have distributed basic goods such as rice, noodles, and cooking oil to residents. As a result, community activity in the villa has gradually begun to increase.

=== Public transportation ===
Jinkeng Station on Guangzhou Metro Line 21 is located near the Australia Garden Village development, approximately a 10-minute walk from Exit B. A bus stop bearing the same name, “Jinkeng,” is also situated just outside the community.

== Position of the homeowners in 2025 ==
The situation of homeowners at the Australia Garden Village development varies significantly. Some owners received their homes and completed registration procedures but were unable to obtain property ownership certificates. Others received their homes without registering them, while many never received their properties at all. The majority of buyers were retired government officials, engineers, doctors, and even well-known figures in the fields of sports and the arts. Following the collapse of the project, some homeowners were forced to repay their mortgages on their own, as they had borrowed from banks but the Australia-America Company failed to cover the promised interest payments. Some owners expressed fears that, upon finally receiving their properties, they would be greeted not with keys but with memorial portraits—referencing the fact that several buyers passed away before ever moving into their new homes. In some cases, owners had used their home purchase quotas to buy property in the Australia Garden Village, preventing them from purchasing homes elsewhere in Huangpu District. With the assistance of journalists, a few were able to coordinate with the developer and government authorities to terminate their contracts and free up their quotas. After the project was left unfinished, many owners sought to defend their rights by petitioning banks, government agencies, and the media. The long-term rights protection efforts of Australia Garden Village homeowners were eventually listed as a significant source of potential social instability at the provincial, municipal, and district levels. According to data from the Property Owners Committee, as of the Mid-Autumn Festival in 2020, more than 1,100 homeowners could still be contacted, but fewer than 300 were actively involved in ongoing rights defense efforts.

== Reflection on the project ==
Lawyer Jin Yan noted that although the Australia Garden Village project began as a typical case of unfinished real estate development, the dramatic rise in land prices in recent years has triggered a wave of interest and disputes among developers, turning land ownership into a highly contentious issue. Jin emphasized that resolving the matter in a fair and effective manner will require substantial intervention and support from relevant government authorities.

== See also ==
- Housing in China
- Underoccupied developments in China
