= Book boat =

Itinerant book trade in China

Book boats (Chinese: 書船; pinyin: shūchuán) were small merchant ships used by itinerant booksellers in China during the Ming and Qing dynasties.

== History ==
Although the practice of itinerant merchants travelling along rivers and canals to sell books may have originated as early as the Song dynasty, book boats' ubiquity to the Chinese book trade arose during the Ming dynasty in response to expansions and repairs to waterway infrastructure.

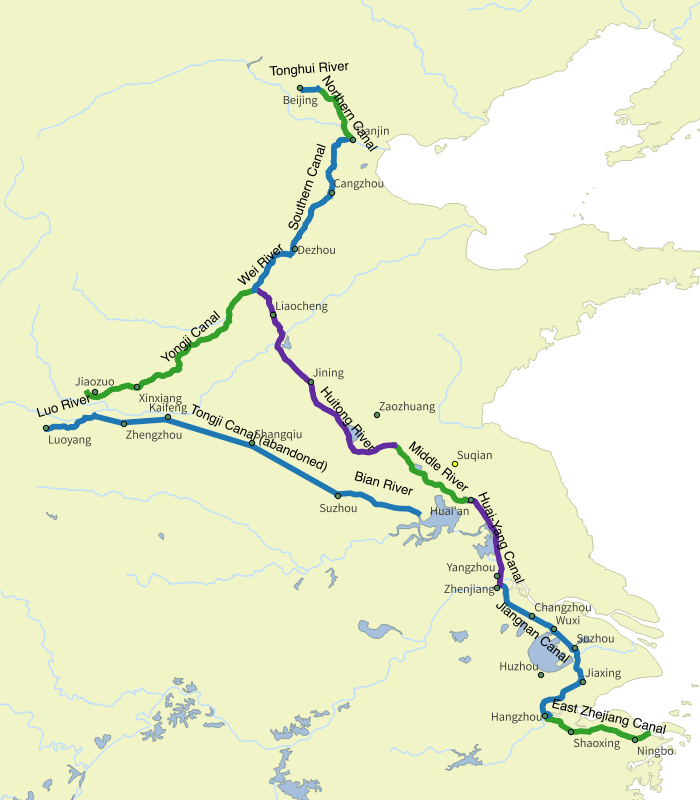
The Grand Canal was a vital waterway used by book boats to bring books to the capital at Beijing.

The Jiangnan region along the lower Yangtze saw widespread infrastructure improvements during the Ming dynasty. The complex network of rivers, lakes, and canals in the region was maintained and expanded by the Ming state, allowing passenger and merchant vessels to travel between towns and cities across eastern China. The city of Huzhou, in Zhejiang, became a major center for book publishing and printing, so associated with the itinerant booksellers that book boat merchants were often referred to as "merchants of Huzhou" even when coming from other regions.

The Grand Canal was reopened under the reign of the Yongle Emperor (r. 1402–1424) to supply the newly establish capital city of Beijing. In addition to the flow of grain to the capital, massive numbers of books were shipped from Jiangnan via the canal. During the High Qing era, Beijing saw heavy demand for books, met mainly by book boats plying the canals from Jiangnan. This was intensified during large editing projects such as the compilation of the Siku Quanshu under the Qianlong Emperor. Although mainly bringing rare books to sell to scholars and bureaucrats, the book boats also brought more popular works, especially including law books. Floods and blockages along the Grand Canal in 1824 led to the disruption of this trade, and saw publishers move operations to Beijing to meet demand for legal texts.

River and canal infrastructure declined as a means of transport in China over the course of the 19th century. Especially following the 1850–1864 Taiping Rebellion, itinerant book peddlers were sidelined in a reorganized book trade.

== Business practices ==
Bookstores were rare during the High Qing, often only found in market towns and major cities. As such, book boats were common in rural areas and smaller towns along river routes. Some peddlers specialized in rarer books for scholars and officials, while others sold for vernacular consumption across the Jiangnan.

Songjiang, Hangzhou, and Dantu were major hubs for book trading and frequented by book boat traders.
