= Chinese property bubble (2005–2011) =

Real estate bubble

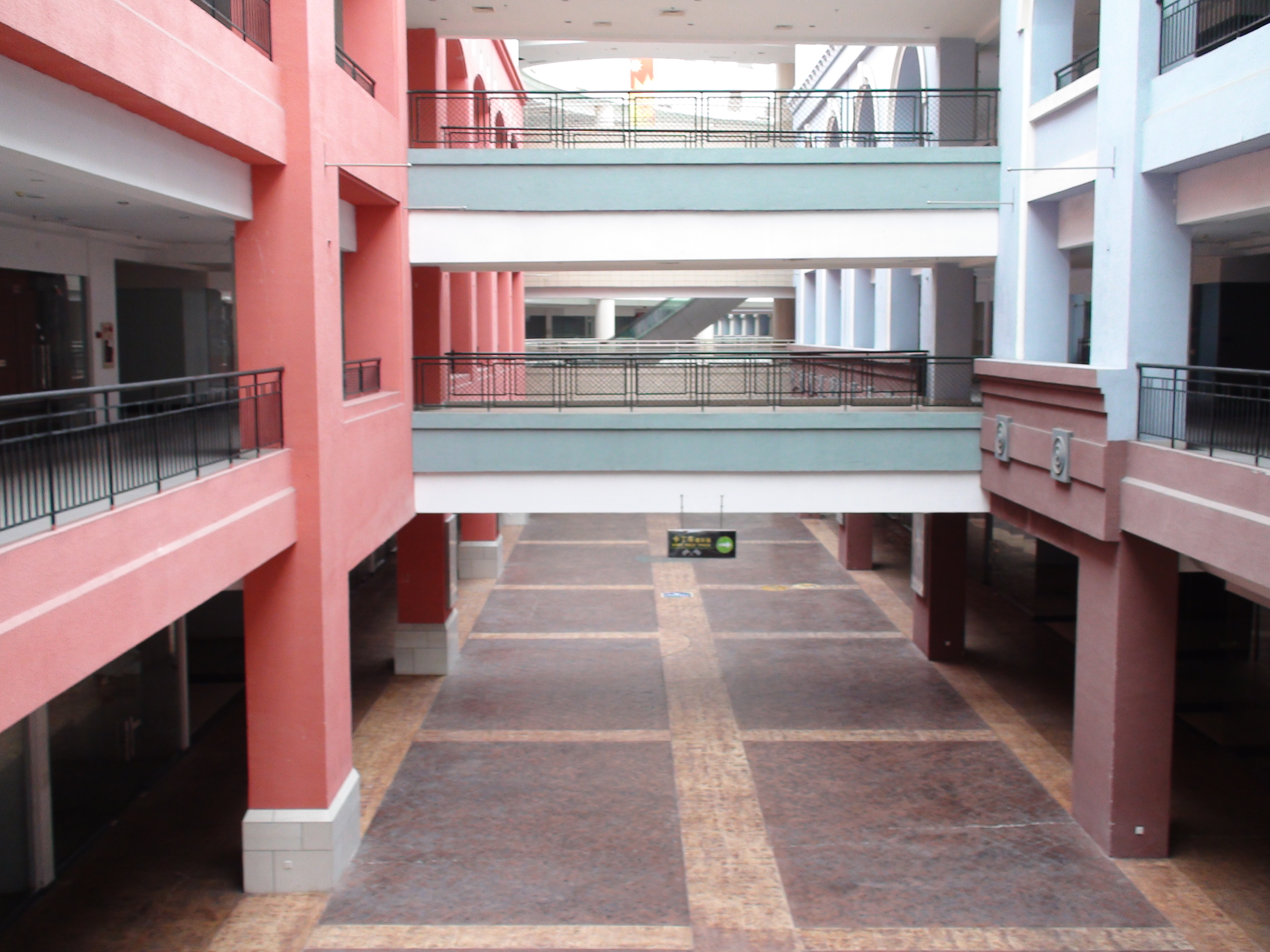
An empty corridor in the mostly vacant New South China Mall

The 2005 Chinese property bubble was a real estate bubble in residential and commercial real estate in China. The New York Times reported that the bubble started to deflate in 2011, while observing increased complaints that members of the middle class were unable to afford homes in large cities. The deflation of the property bubble is seen as one of the primary causes for China's declining economic growth in 2013.

The phenomenon had seen average housing prices in the country triple from 2005 to 2009, possibly driven by both government policies and Chinese cultural attitudes. High price-to-income and price-to-rent ratios for property and the high number of unoccupied residential and commercial units have been cited as evidence of a bubble. Later, average housing prices in the country increased between 2010 and 2013,

Critics of the bubble theory point to China's relatively conservative mortgage lending standards and trends of increasing urbanization and rising incomes as proof that property prices are justified.

== History ==
=== Economic contributors ===
There have been many factors that may have led to rising housing prices. Possible contributors include low interest rates and increased bank lending, beginning in 2003 under Wen Jiabao which allowed cheap credit for the construction and purchase of property while making competing debt investments less appealing. During the bubble, local government relied on land sales for income (accounting for up to 50% of revenue), incentivizing the continued sale and development of land. Limited access to foreign investments for Chinese citizens increased the appeal of domestic investments such as property. Chinese citizens also faced cultural pressures encouraging home ownership, particularly for men seeking a wife.

Responding to the Great Recession, the spending from the China economic stimulus program may have found its way into real estate, contributing to the bubble.

=== Non-economic contributors ===
Grey income: According to independent economist Andy Xie, the scale of China's grey income is very large- possibly one-tenth of GDP. Most grey incomes are invested in the real estate market of tier 1 and tier 2 cities, which contributes to the fact that the leverage rate of Chinese properties are small compared to the property bubbles in other countries. The normalization of grey incomes in China fed the property bubble in the long run.

=== Rising fears of a bubble ===
Between 2005 and 2011, average housing prices rose rapidly in the Chinese real estate market. Analysts argued over whether this rise was a result of a speculative real estate bubble, or genuine increases in demand. Evidence for a bubble included significant numbers of vacant or underperforming commercial and residential properties and the continued construction of property despite these facts, including an estimated 64 million vacant apartments. There were high price-to-income ratios for real estate, such as in Beijing where the ratio was 27-to-1 for a double income household, five times the international average. There were also high price-to-rent ratios for real estate, such as in Beijing where the ratio was 500:1 months compared to the global ratio of 300:1 months There was a weak secondary market for Chinese homes, with the ratio of secondary to primary residential property transactions at 0.26 for the first half of 2009 (four times as many new home purchases as secondary sales). Comparably, Hong Kong had a ratio of 7.25, and the U.S. had a ratio of 13.45.

Contributing to the bubble were Chinese companies in the chemical, steel, textile and shoe industries opening real estate divisions, expecting higher returns than in their core businesses. During this period, residential housing investment as a share of China's GDP has tripled from 2% in 2000 to 6% in 2011, similar to the peak of the U.S. housing bubble.

Analysts, including Cao Jianhai, professor at the Chinese Academy of Social Sciences, Andy Xie, a Shanghai economist, and Zhang Xin, a CEO of Beijing real estate developer SOHO China warned of the threat of a bubble and the economic stagnation that would follow. In response to fears of a bubble, in the summer of 2011, Standard & Poor's downgraded its outlook for China real estate development sector to negative from stable, following a tightening of credit conditions in the country and slower sales.

However, trends of increasing urbanization and rising incomes in China seemed to continue to support real estate prices. The World Bank stated in a November 2009 report that Chinese home prices had not outpaced increases in incomes on a nationwide level, which dispelled worries of a looming bubble. However, in its 17 March 2010 quarterly report, the group said China needed to raise interest rates to contain the risk of a property bubble. In China, there were comparatively conservative mortgage lending practices, particularly in contrast to those at the height of the United States housing bubble.

The Economist Intelligence Unit's Access China service released a follow-up report to the October 2010 report "CHAMPS: China's fastest-growing cities", entitled "Building Rome in a day: The sustainability of China's housing boom". The report forecasted the population and average income in close to 300 Chinese cities, and the subsequent demand for housing in China during the next decade. The report stated that "with China's property market being an important global economic indicator, China's housing boom will present opportunities for investors in sectors such as furniture, cars and building materials." Regarding China's urban population, the report forecasts that between 2011 and 2020 it will "increase by 26.1% or over 160 million people, while urban per head disposable incomes will increase by 2.6-fold to 51,310 RMB (about US$7,500 at current exchange rates)."

=== Deflation of the bubble and effects on growth ===
Between 2010 and 2011, policies were enacted to curb the bubble from worsening or prevent it from occurring. The Chinese cabinet announced in 2010 it would monitor capital flows to "stop overseas speculative funds from jeopardizing China's property market" and also begin requiring families purchasing a second home to make at least a 40% down-payment.

In early 2011, Beijing banned the sale of homes to those who have not lived in Beijing for five years. Beijing also limited the number of homes a native Beijing family could own to two, and allowed only one home for non-native Beijing families. By July 2011, the Chinese Government raised interest rates for the third time that year. A new nationwide real estate sales tax was introduced in China in late 2009 as a measure to curb speculative investing. A mortgage discount for first-time property buyers – which had offered fixed, 5% 20-year mortgages at just above 4% – was also eliminated.

The deflation of the bubble began in the summer of 2011, when home prices began to slow or fall in Chinese cities. The end of the property bubble is seen as one of the primary causes for China's declining economic growth in 2012.

As told in an Al Jazeera documentary called Chinese Dreamland by David Borenstein, China's technocrats planned to avoid the 2008 financial crisis and the Great Recession by creating the greatest housing boom in human history, with then-Premier Wen Jiabao proclaiming that "confidence is more important than gold or capital" to maintain employment and GDP growth. China ending up using more concrete in two years than the United States did during the entire 20th century. The property bubble peaked in 2009. By 2012, as large established population centers were saturated, developers were building new communities in rural areas in order to keep up the momentum. Since the best way to market countryside housing was "internationalisation" by depicting them as global commerce metropolises, real estate developers enlisted "rent-a-foreigner" companies to stage "dazzling spectacles where their foreign employees are presented as famous entertainers, important businessmen, top-20 models, diplomats, architects". Borenstein observed that these "erotic fantasies" [fueled a] speculative frenzy" which went hand-in-hand with overbuilding in order to maintain the facade of confidence, discouraging negative financial reports which showed that demand was well overstated or even not justified. By 2014 developers were facing a growing backlash, from rural farmers whose land was expropriated without proper compensation, and from buyers upset by the poor quality, or at other units in the same development being sold at steep discounts. This bubble ended up creating ghost cities that were abandoned incomplete or finished but largely unoccupied. Most of these empty developments are found in minor cities where state-run industries and mines had closed down, and new housing projects were seen by local officials as a means of diversification as well as cashing in on the property bubble.

The property bubble has resulted in poor quality design and construction, ending up in buildings often unfinished or unoccupied. Developers and contractors often cut corners to pocket money, while there is often a shortage of skilled labor, and projects often have short time constraints. Austin Williams wrote that this trend was consistent with capitalism where "Its early stages usually involve building shit, making a profit, and moving on to the next deal – even if the building falls down soon after". In addition, long-lasting buildings are less profitable than those buildings shoddily built and rebuilt during the same time span; indeed repeated demolition and construction counts toward GDP economic growth.

== City statistics ==
- Shanghai
  - Real estate prices increased by over 150% between 2003 and 2010
- Beijing and Shanghai
  - Sales of residential buildings rose by 32.6% in the first 10 months of 2013, according to NBSC. In Shanghai, sales volume of new homes sharply increased by around 26% year-over-year to Q3 2013, according to Colliers International. But residential sales in Beijing were up by only 3.2% in the first 10 months, according to the Beijing Municipal Bureau of Statistics,
- Tianjin
  - Projected to have more prime office space than can be absorbed in 25 years at the current rate

== See also ==
- Chinese property sector crisis (2020–present)
- Dwelling Narrowness
- Nail house
- Underoccupied developments in China
- Real estate in China
