= Tianducheng =

Housing estate in Xingqiao Subdistrict, Hangzhou, China

Tianducheng (天都城)
- Guangsha Tianducheng (广厦天都城)
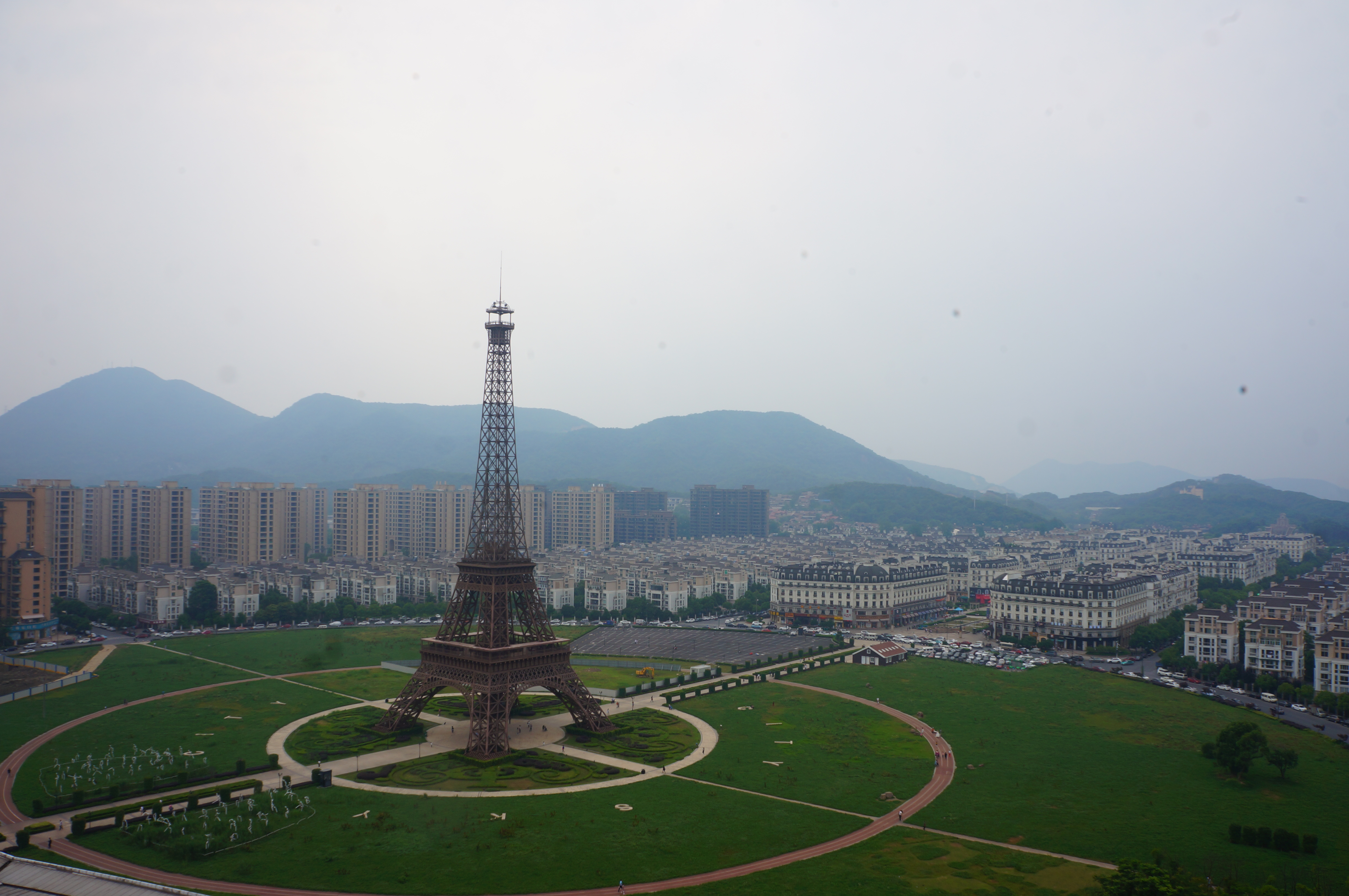
- Tianducheng
- Nicknames: Paris II, Paris of the East, Bucharest
- Location in Zhejiang
- Coordinates: 30°23′23″N 120°14′32″E
- Country: People's Republic of China
- Province: Zhejiang
- Sub-provincial city: Hangzhou
- District: Linping
- Subdistrict: Xingqiao

Area
  - Total: 31 km^{2} (12 sq mi)
  - Land: 31 km^{2} (12 sq mi)

Population
  - Total: ~30,000
- Time zone: UTC+8 (China Standard)

Tianducheng (Chinese: 天都城; pinyin: Tiāndūchéng), officially Guangsha Tianducheng (Chinese: 广厦天都城; pinyin: Guǎngshà Tiāndūchéng), is a housing estate in Xingqiao Subdistrict, Linping District, Hangzhou, Zhejiang Province, China that is modeled after Paris. Once labeled a "ghost city," the estate has undergone significant growth since its early years. Originally planned to house 10,000 residents, its population increased from about 2,000 in 2013 to around 30,000 by 2017. The city has since expanded several times to accommodate rising demand.

== History ==
Construction at Tianducheng began around 2007 (19 years ago). Its central feature is 108-metre-tall (354-foot) replica of the Eiffel Tower, French-style radiating avenues, neoclassical buildings, and Baroque-style fountains and statues.

It opened in 2007, and can accommodate more than 100,000 residents. Initial occupancy was low, with an estimated 2,000 people living in the development by 2013, leading some to label it a ghost town. By 2017, its population had grown to 30,000 and the development was expanded several times. It is mostly populated by middle class residents.

Popularity of the site with tourists has waned since its opening, as more Chinese have been able to visit Paris themselves.

The park under the Eiffel Tower replica is undergoing construction into a commercial area, due to finish in 2027.

== In popular culture ==
In 2017, French photographer François Prost visited the neighborhood, finding the buildings and monuments to be "incredibly similar" to their French counterparts.

In 2023, Yes Theory visited it and published a YouTube video titled "I Explored China's Failed $1 Billion Copy of Paris (real city)" showing that, while it was less crowded than many other Chinese cities, it certainly wasn't a ghost town.

English musician Jamie xx filmed a music video for his song Gosh in Tianducheng.

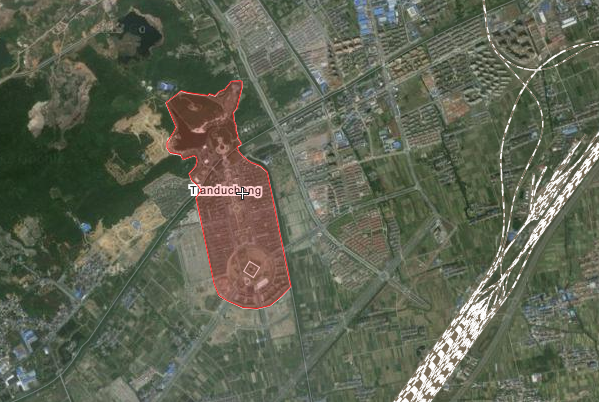
Aerial View of Tianducheng

== Transport ==
Huangheshan station on Line 3 of the Hangzhou Metro serving Tianducheng opened on February 22, 2022.

== Gallery ==
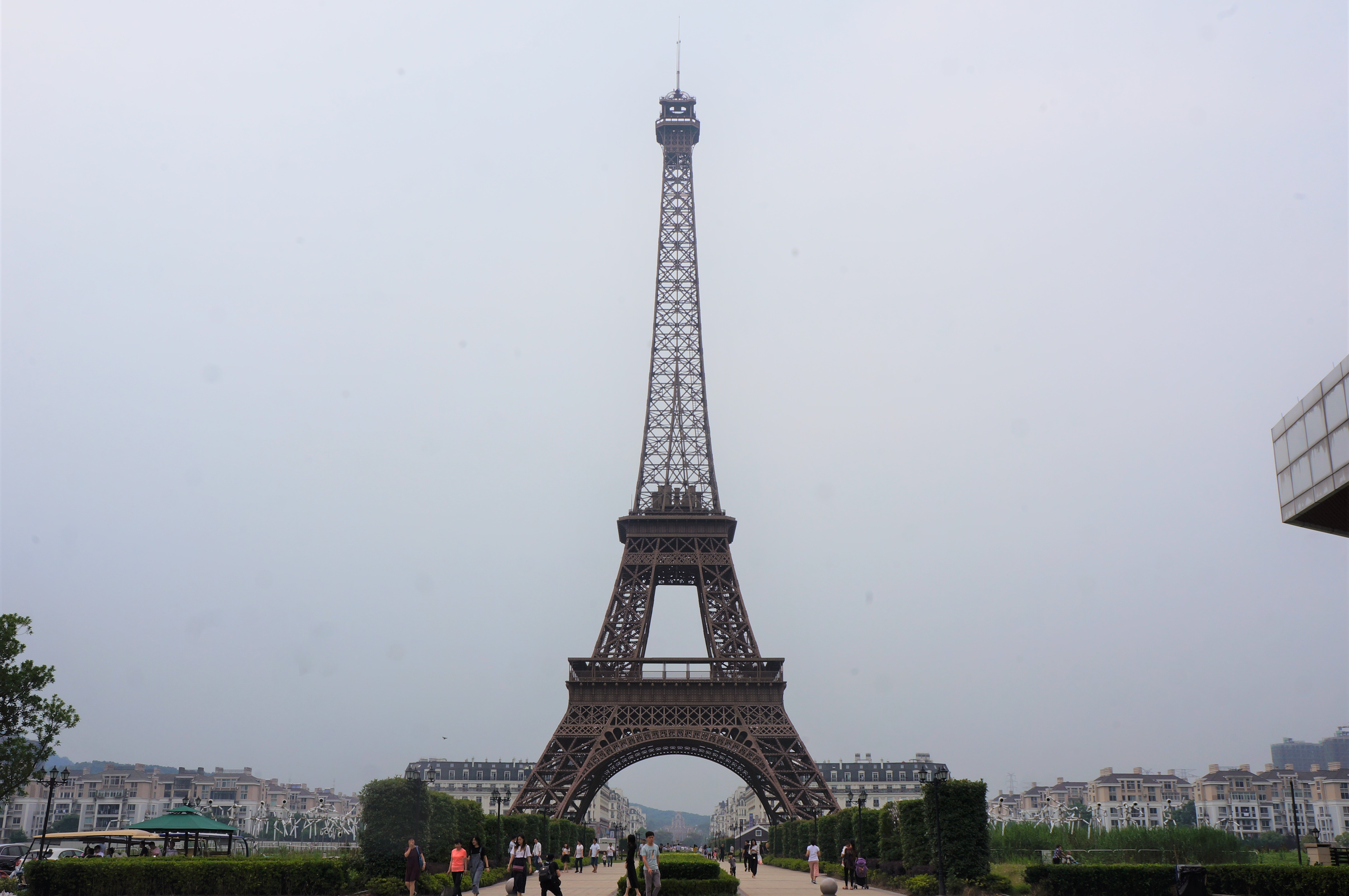
The replica of the Eiffel Tower.

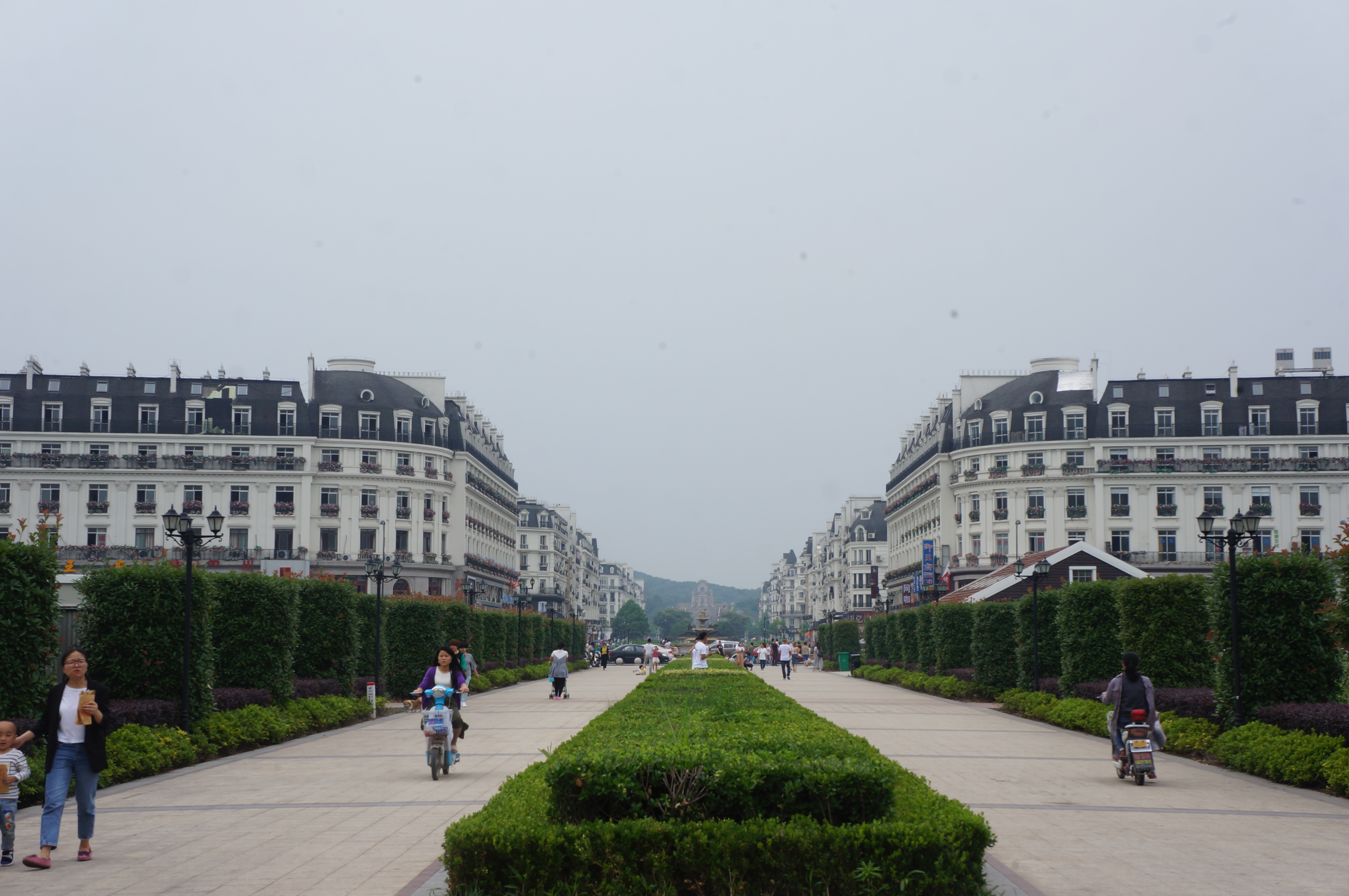
"Champs-Élysées". Formally named as Xiangxie Road.

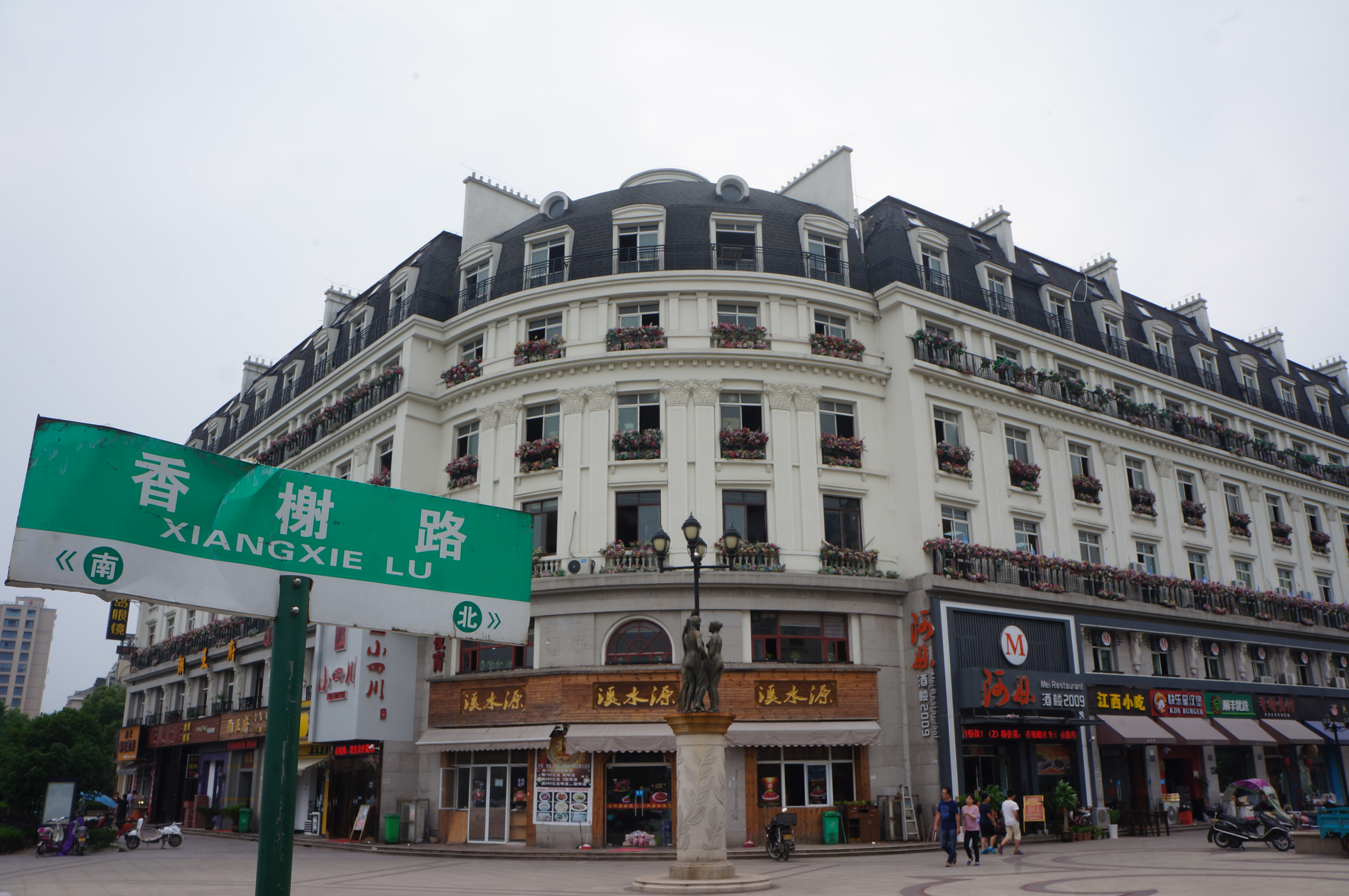
Road sign of Xiangxie Road.

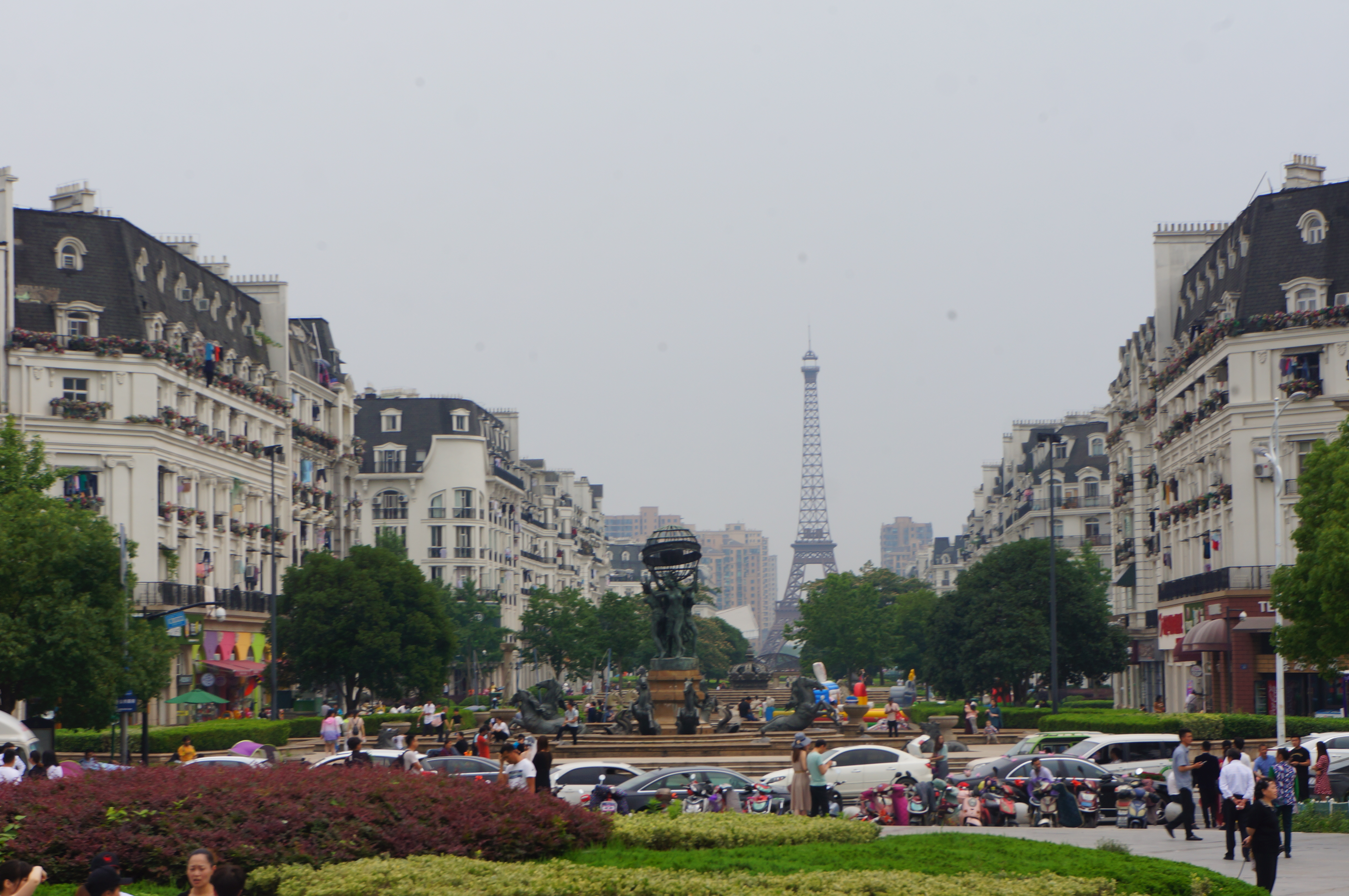
Viewed from the north end of Xiangxie Road.

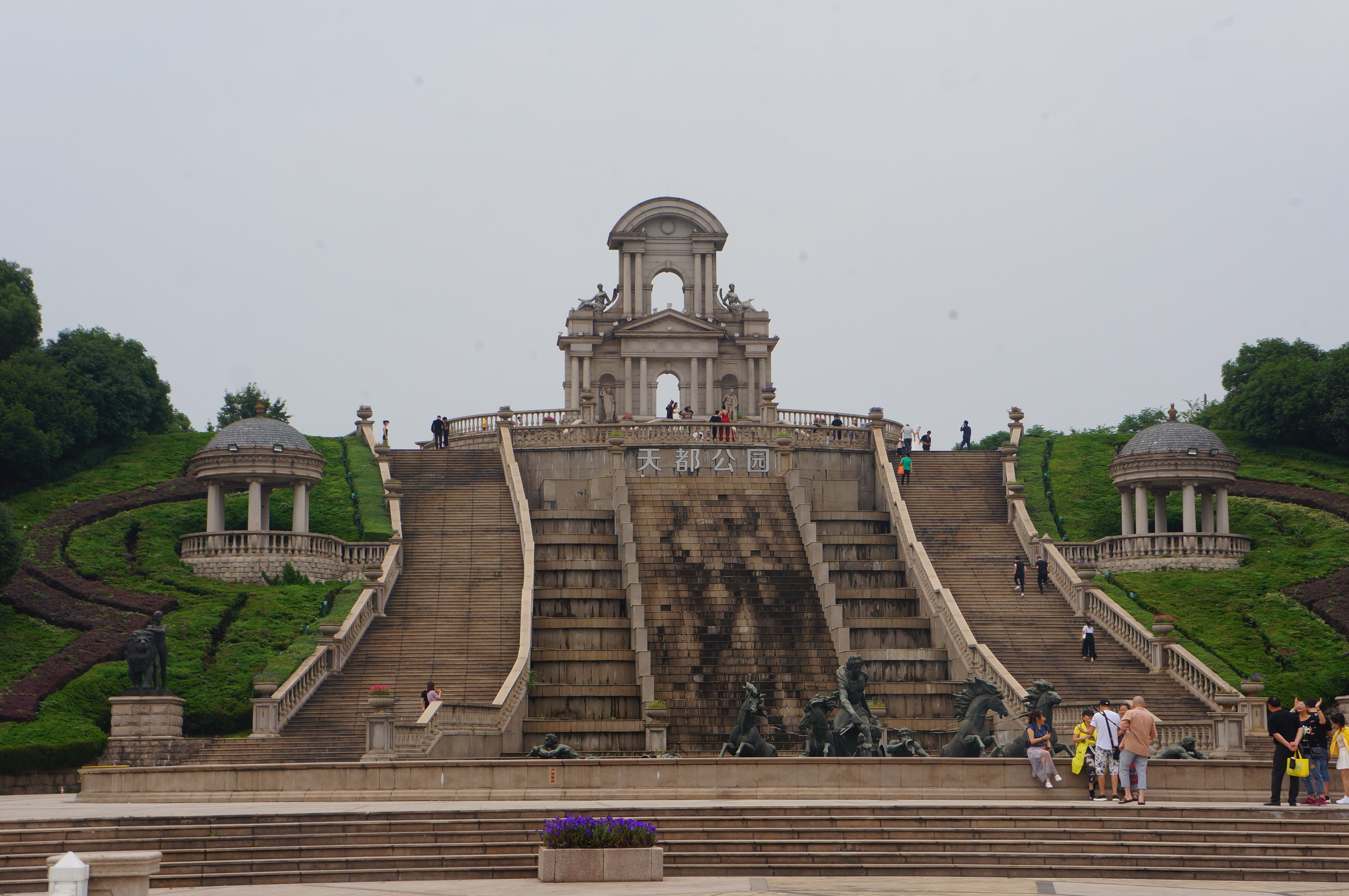
Tiandu Park.
