= Dantu, Zhenjiang =

Dantu 丹徒区
- District
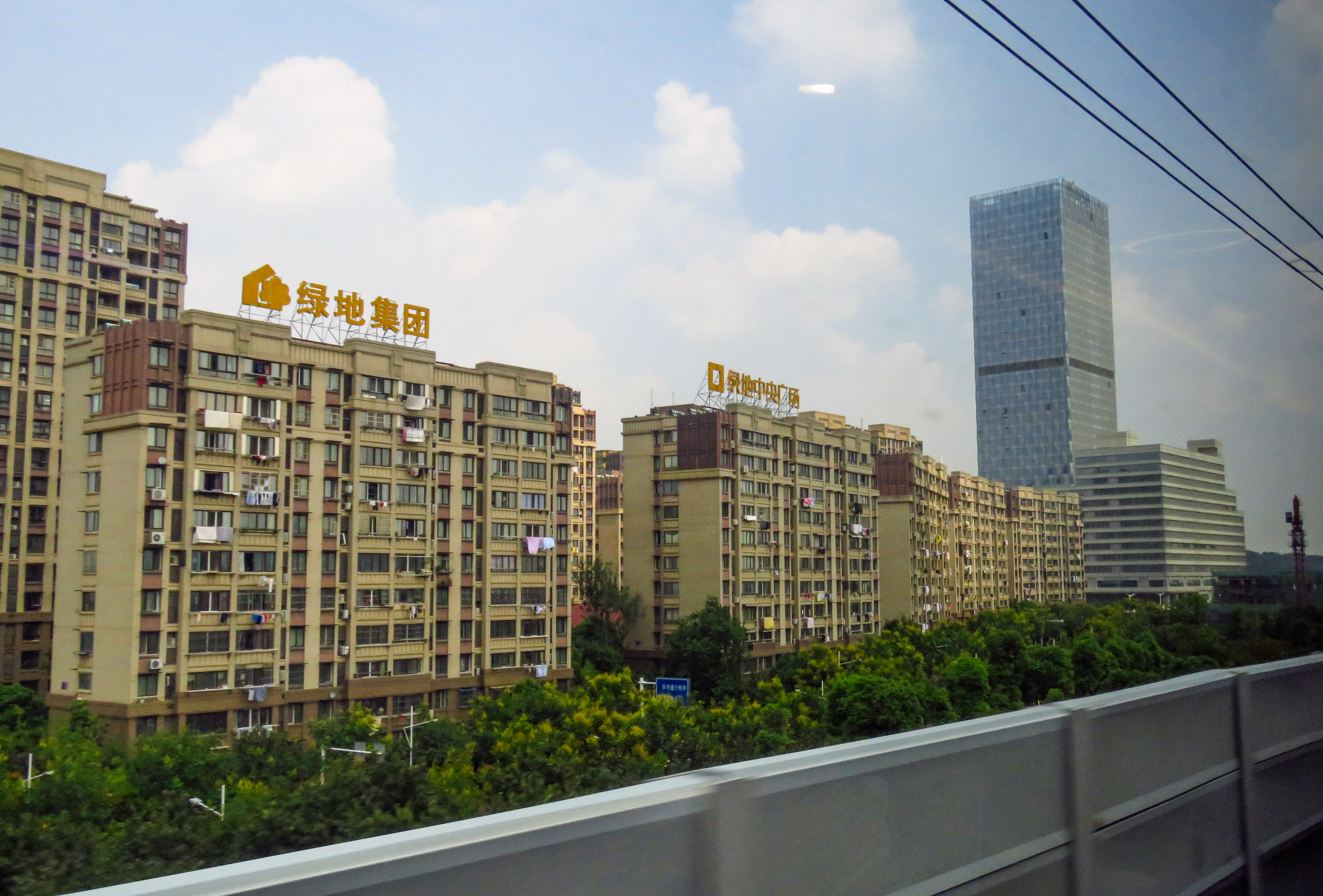
- Dantu District in September 2017

- Location in Jiangsu
- Coordinates: 32°03′16″N 119°31′40″E
- Country: People's Republic of China
- Province: Jiangsu
- Prefecture-level city: Zhenjiang

Area
  - District: 611 km^{2} (236 sq mi)

Population (2020 census)
  - District: 347,264
  - Density: 568/km^{2} (1,470/sq mi)
  - Urban: 247,130
  - Rural: 100,134
- Time zone: UTC+8 (China Standard)
- Postal code: 212100

Dantu District (simplified Chinese: 丹徒区; traditional Chinese: 丹徒區; pinyin: Dāntú Qū) is one of three districts of Zhenjiang, Jiangsu province, China. A development called Dantu New City was constructed in the district and was underoccupied since around 2005 and criticized as a ghost city by international media. However, since 2013 the development has been filling up with residents with many operating shops and offices, becoming a functional suburb of urban Zhenjiang.

There are two islands that belong to Dantu, in addition to the Yangtze River at the north it has a town. It is bordered to the east by the Jiajiang neighborhood in Yangzhong. To the south-east lies Danyang and to the west is Jurong. The Yangtze River borders Dantu to the north.

The district covers an area of 748.8 square kilometers and by 2020, had a population of 347,264. The postal code for Dantu is 212100.

== Administrative divisions ==
In the present, Dantu District has 1 subdistrict and 6 towns.

1 subdistrict

- Gaozi (高资街道)

6 towns

- Gaoqiao (高桥镇)
- Xinfeng (辛丰镇)
- Guyang (谷阳镇)
- Shangdang (上党镇)
- Baoyan (宝堰镇)
- Shiye (世业镇)

== Climate ==
Climate data for Dantu, elevation 18 m (59 ft), (1991–2020 normals, extremes 1981–2010)
Month	Jan	Feb	Mar	Apr	May	Jun	Jul	Aug	Sep	Oct	Nov	Dec	Year
Record high °C (°F)	20.8 (69.4)	26.5 (79.7)	29.5 (85.1)	33.5 (92.3)	36.5 (97.7)	38.0 (100.4)	39.5 (103.1)	38.8 (101.8)	38.2 (100.8)	32.5 (90.5)	29.2 (84.6)	22.8 (73.0)	39.5 (103.1)
Mean daily maximum °C (°F)	7.1 (44.8)	9.7 (49.5)	14.6 (58.3)	21.0 (69.8)	26.2 (79.2)	29.0 (84.2)	32.2 (90.0)	31.7 (89.1)	27.8 (82.0)	22.6 (72.7)	16.4 (61.5)	9.8 (49.6)	20.7 (69.2)
Daily mean °C (°F)	3.2 (37.8)	5.3 (41.5)	9.8 (49.6)	15.7 (60.3)	21.1 (70.0)	24.7 (76.5)	28.2 (82.8)	27.8 (82.0)	23.6 (74.5)	18.1 (64.6)	11.8 (53.2)	5.5 (41.9)	16.2 (61.2)
Mean daily minimum °C (°F)	0.1 (32.2)	1.9 (35.4)	5.8 (42.4)	11.1 (52.0)	16.7 (62.1)	21.1 (70.0)	24.9 (76.8)	24.7 (76.5)	20.4 (68.7)	14.4 (57.9)	8.1 (46.6)	2.1 (35.8)	12.6 (54.7)
Record low °C (°F)	−9.0 (15.8)	−11.0 (12.2)	−5.6 (21.9)	−0.1 (31.8)	7.3 (45.1)	12.1 (53.8)	18.4 (65.1)	17.9 (64.2)	10.7 (51.3)	3.2 (37.8)	−4.6 (23.7)	−12.0 (10.4)	−12.0 (10.4)
Average precipitation mm (inches)	55.9 (2.20)	54.5 (2.15)	81.2 (3.20)	75.8 (2.98)	88.8 (3.50)	184.4 (7.26)	210.7 (8.30)	165.2 (6.50)	78.1 (3.07)	57.6 (2.27)	58.9 (2.32)	39.9 (1.57)	1,151 (45.32)
Average precipitation days (≥ 0.1 mm)	9.3	9.2	10.6	9.5	10.1	11.1	13.7	12.8	8.2	7.7	8.5	7.3	118
Average snowy days	3.3	2.5	0.9	0.1	0	0	0	0	0	0	0.3	1.2	8.3
Average relative humidity (%)	71	71	69	68	69	76	79	79	76	72	72	69	73
Mean monthly sunshine hours	132.1	130.5	153.6	180.7	191.9	149.0	185.5	189.8	168.9	172.8	149.2	145.1	1,949.1
Percentage possible sunshine	41	41	41	46	45	35	43	46	46	49	48	47	44
Source: China Meteorological Administration
