= Housing in China =

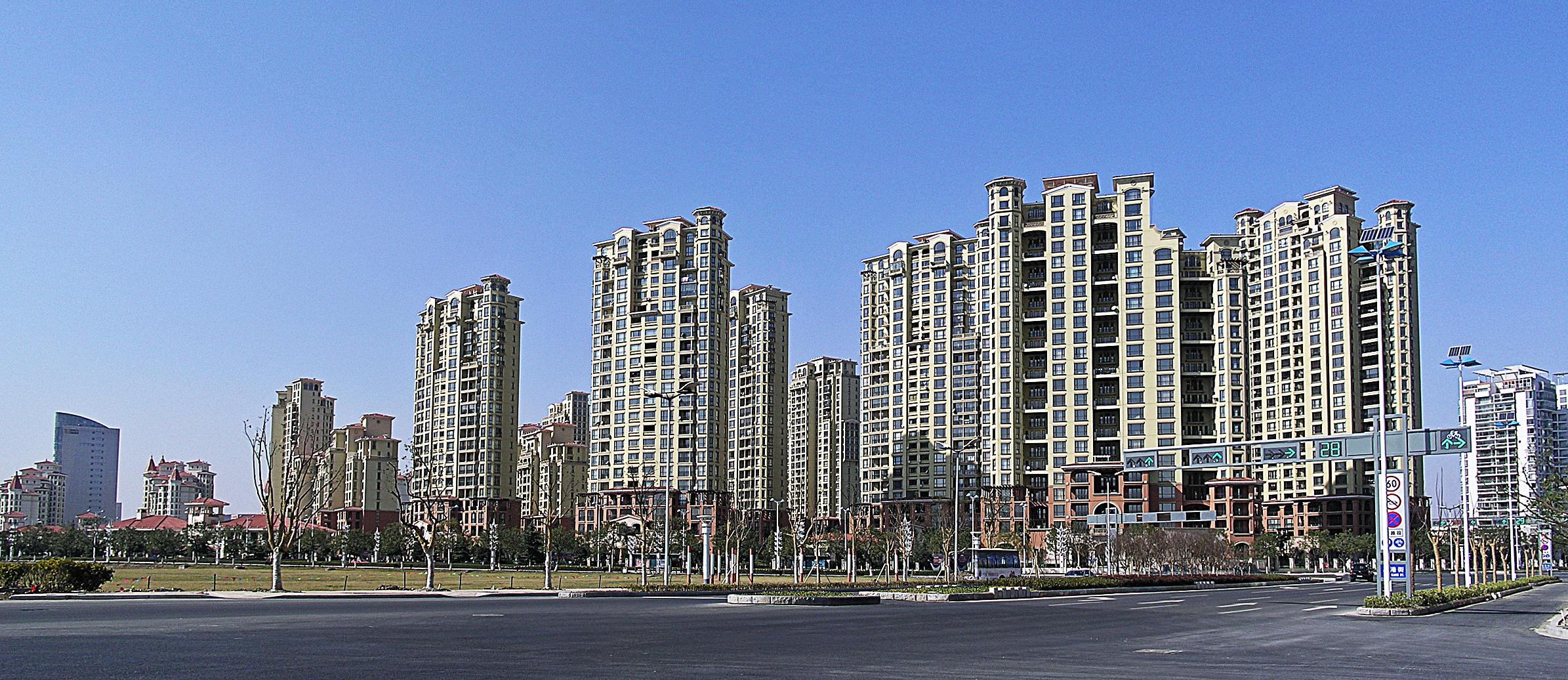
Apartments in Suzhou

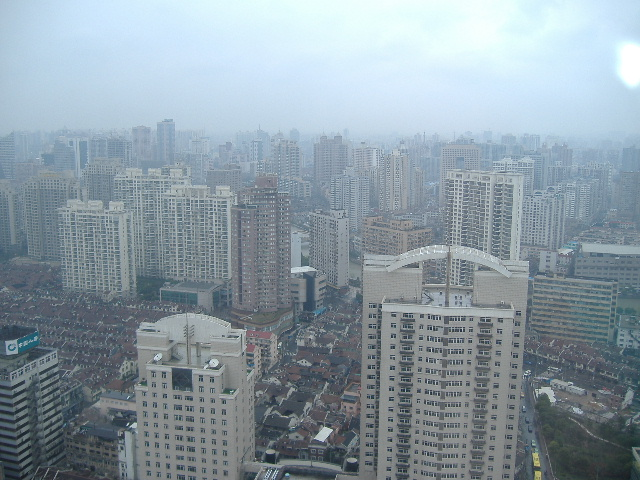
Apartments in Shanghai

In recent years, housing development has ballooned in the People's Republic of China as its economy has developed. Since 1978, the government has promoted the commercialization of housing in urban areas. Property development has become big business in China, with new cities and suburbs springing up with new apartments.

== Home ownership ==
During the early 1980s, both central and local governments began to gradually explore the marketization of real estate assets in China. The first legal land sale took place in 1986 in Shenzhen, one of the pioneering Special Economic Zones in China's reform. Shanghai adopted this approach soon after, leasing its first land to a Japanese firm in 1988, which initiated land transactions. This move towards treating land as a commodity was key in the emergence of commercial housing development in China.

As of 2023, China has one of the highest home ownership rates in the world, with 90% of urban households owning their homes.

== Housing construction ==
China's former underoccupied developments (sometimes referred to as "ghost cities") have had an underreported degree of success in filling up. According to Wade Shepherd, after the ghost cities becomes a thriving city, they no longer become a much talked about topic in the western media. Ex-ghost cities are rarely news compared to when they were ghost cities. Wade says, "It generally takes at least a decade for China's new urban developments to start breaking the inertia of stagnation. But once they do, they tend to keep growing, eventually blending in with the broader urban landscape and losing their “ghost city” label."

The issue of housing costs in China was not applicable to the housing market pre-1978 in China. Before the 1970s, the construction of housing in China was sacrificed for the development of industries and industrial growth. The construction of the housing industry only received a small portion of state-allocated funds to continue to develop the industry. Low rents for urban housing were enticing to many people, causing the available housing to be rented out quickly, giving the state little money for the precious space they are renting out. This led to a shortage of housing and a shortage of funds to build more housing.

Between the years of 1995 and 2015, the total investment allocated to the housing industry from the Chinese government has increased from a cap of 50,000 yuan to a cut-off point of 5 million yuan, showing a renewed interest in housing development in recent years from the Chinese government after years of limited funding towards the urban housing projects. The Chinese government announced in March 2011 the objective of building 36 million units of housing by 2015. In September 2011 alone, work commenced on 1.2 million units across China; a 70% increase in the construction of social housing compared with 2010 construction. By 2014, Chinese builders have added 100 billion square feet of housing space in China, equating to 74 square feet per person. Construction of urban housing was a major undertaking. The country has shown a major shift in allocating funds and resources to housing their people, building over 5.5 million apartments between the years of 2003 and 2014 in China's cities. These construction projects assigned by the state influence the construction job market in China as well. In 2014 alone, 29 million people were employed in urban construction businesses around China.

=== Property bubble ===
The 2011 estimates by property analysts state that there are some 89 million empty properties and apartments in China, and that housing development in China is massively oversupplied and overvalued, and is a bubble waiting to burst with serious consequences in the future. The BBC cites Ordos in Inner Mongolia as the largest ghost town in China, full of empty shopping malls and apartment complexes. However, there have later been contradictions to this property bubble theory as for example, CNN in 2015 also cites The New South China Mall in Dongguan, the biggest shopping mall in the world, was virtually empty for over a decade and that its owners were determined to make the mall full occupancy again. In 2018 after renovations, the mall is reported almost at full occupancy and no longer a "ghost mall". Indicating that the theoretical reasons of a property bubble making it a ghost mall in 2015, may not have even been the determining factor given the only changes were renovations to bring in mass tenants.

Though a large, and largely uninhabited urban real estate development has been constructed 25 km from Dongsheng District in the Kangbashi New Area. Intended to house a million people, it remains largely uninhabited. Intended to have 300,000 residents by 2010, government figures stated it had 28,000 residents by this time. However, in 2017, the ghost city label is less valid to hang on Ordos Kangbashi. According to a report in 2017, the population has increased to 153,000 people living there, 4,750 businesses are now in operation, and housing prices have risen roughly 50% on average from the end of 2015. Of the 40,000 apartments that had been built in the new district since 2004, only 500 are still on the market.

Critics argue that the national social-housing programme disproportionally benefits the urban population and that not only can many of the rural poor ill afford new housing in the cities, but they also find it difficult to obtain household-registration certificates (hukou). The housing development schemes is also affecting the concentration of unemployment as once housing development are completed, workers may be laid off. According to the former Director of China's Housing & Real Estate Administration Bureau, Professor Lin, as of 2008, Beijing had an average of 1.41 individuals per room across the city.

China's housing prices are closely related to the high capital returns and resource reallocation. China's housing prices have been growing nearly twice as fast as national income over the past decade, despite a high vacancy rate and a high rate of return to capital. The bubble arises because high capital returns driven by resource reallocation are not sustainable in the long run. Rational expectations of a strong future demand for alternative stores of value can thus induce currently productive agents to speculate in the housing market.

== See also ==
- Forced evictions in China
- Underoccupied developments in China
- Real estate in China
- People's commune, collectivist living
