= Underoccupied developments in China =

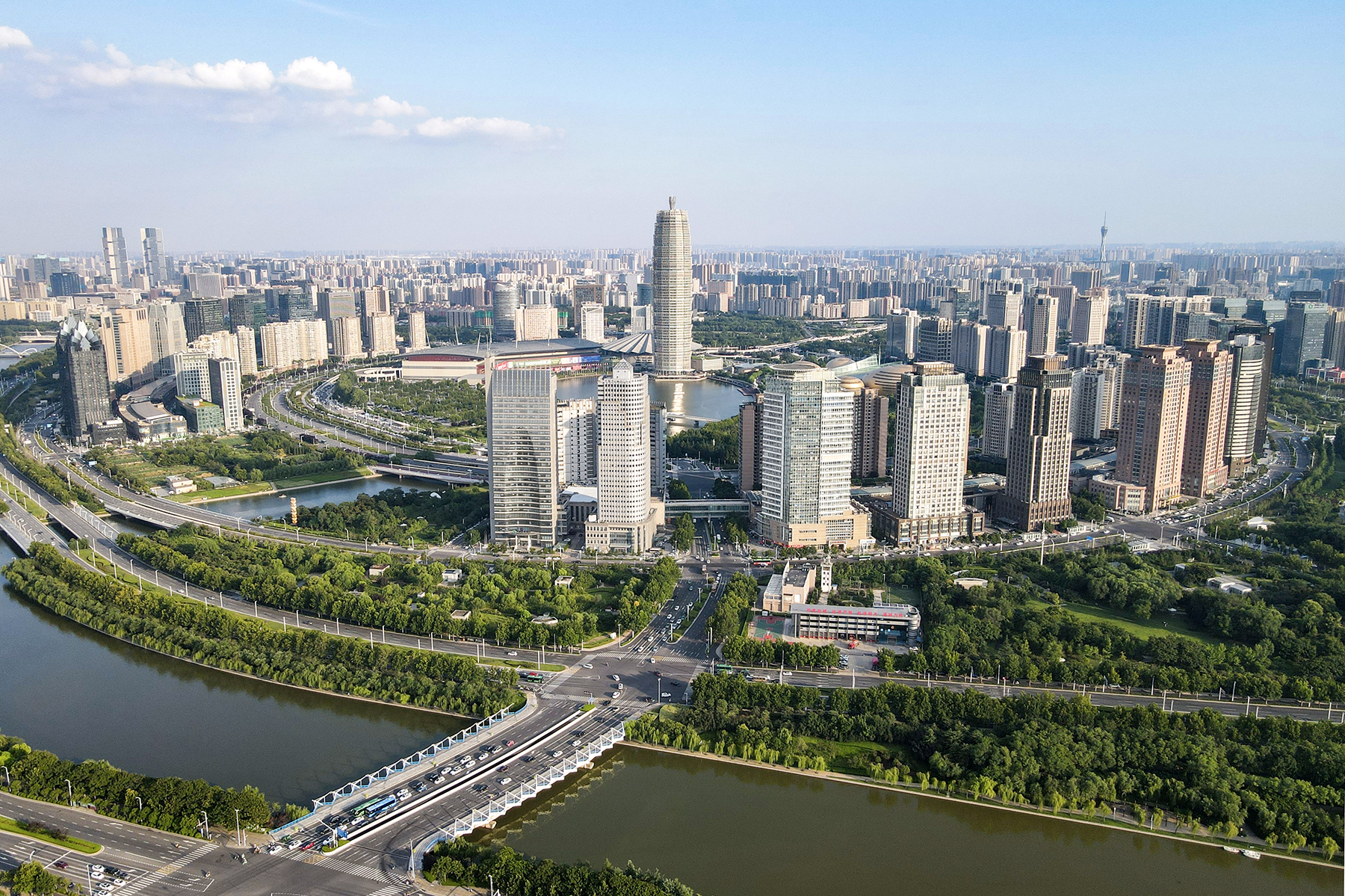
Central Business District of Zhengdong New Area, Zhengzhou

Underoccupied developments in China are mostly unoccupied newly built property developments in China, and frequently referred to as "ghost cities" or ghost towns. The phenomenon was claimed and recorded as early as 2009 by Al Jazeera's Melissa Chan and subsequently reported by news media over the decades. Although a feature of discourse on the Chinese economy and urbanization in China in the 2010s, many developments that were initially criticized as "ghost cities" in China have since become occupied and are now functioning cities.

China's government has set a goal to raise the nation's urbanization rate to around 75% by 2035, which may require the construction of an estimated 40 to 50 million new housing units to accommodate this shift. Some observers argue that China's so-called "ghost cities" are better understood as ambitious urbanization projects built ahead of demand. A 2021 Bloomberg article cited geography professor Max Woodworth who explained these developments often resemble fully constructed cities but lack immediate population inflow. He notes that China's rapid push to urbanize after decades of underurbanization, has led to a pace of construction that sometimes outstrips the rate at which people move in, despite ongoing investment interest. While these areas may appear underutilized initially, they are often intended to fill gradually over time as part of a long-term urban development strategy.

== Terminology ==
Media outlets often label underoccupied development areas in China as "ghost cities" or "ghost towns". However, the two terms are technically misnomers, as they traditionally describe previously inhabited places that became abandoned due to economic decline, whereas many underoccupied developments in China are newly built and have yet to receive significant residential occupation. Author Wade Shepherd defines a "ghost town" as "a place with drastically fewer people and business than there is available space for" and criticizes the idea as a "media invention" in the Chinese context. The International Business Times has characterized Chinese ghost cities as "the result of prematurely built and underfunded urbanization projects that lose backing midway through completion. No definitive academic consensus exists for a "ghost town" definition, although the term generally refers to an area with extremely low occupancy rates.

Additionally, some reported cases of "ghost cities" are not independent administrative entities but rather districts built in the suburban regions of functioning cities to provide accommodation for a growing urban population.

A more precise measure of underutilized urban housing is Housing Utilization Efficiency (HUE), which refers to the ratio of actual residents to the total housing capacity within a given area. Studies have shown that underutilization is far more common than complete vacancy, with China's national HUE declining from 84% in 2010 to 78% in 2020, indicating a growing trend of inefficient housing use. This distinction highlights that many so-called "ghost cities" may not be entirely vacant but rather suffer from low occupancy rates and inefficient urban planning.

== Background ==
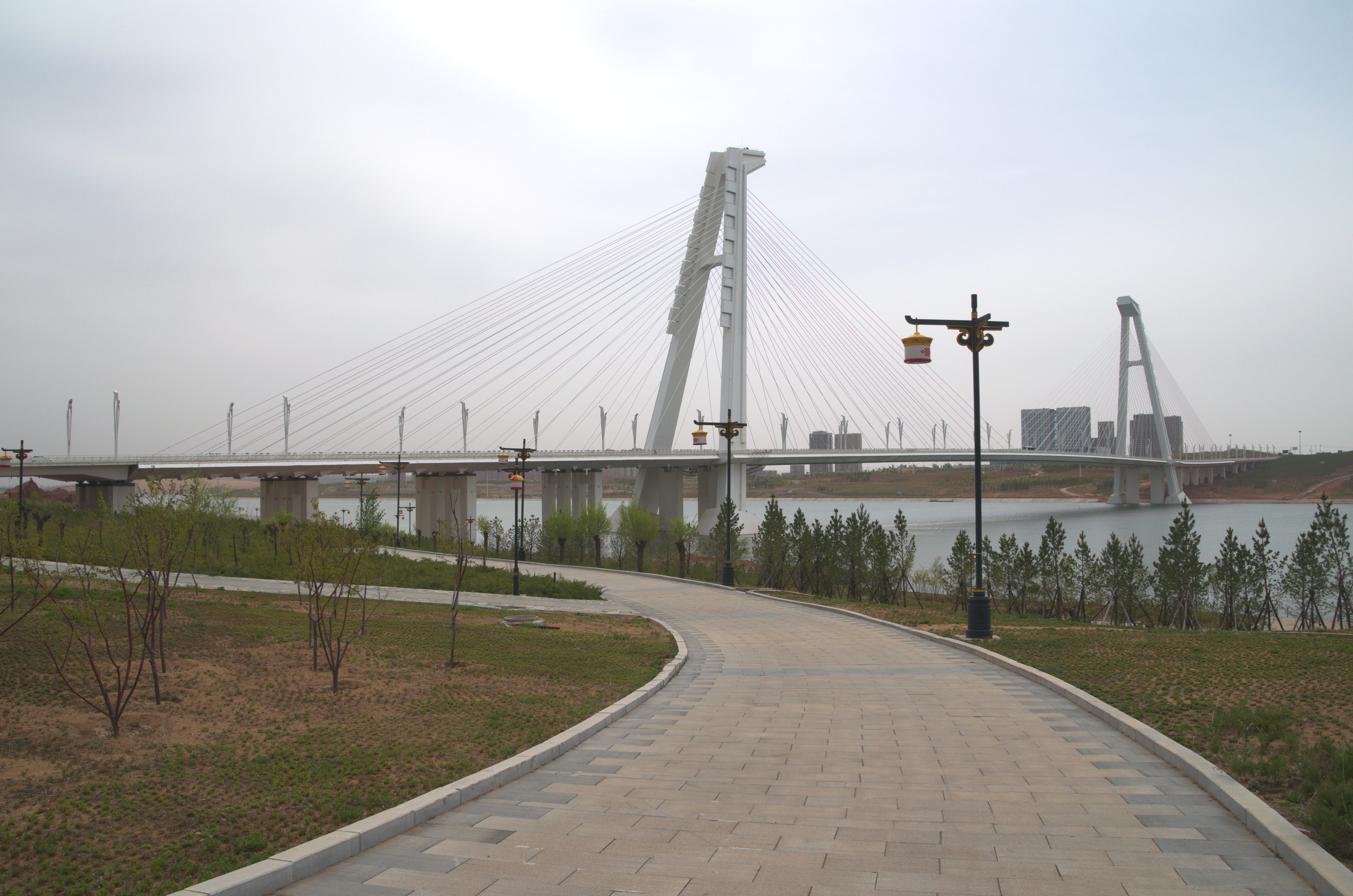
Bridge in Kangbashi, Ordos

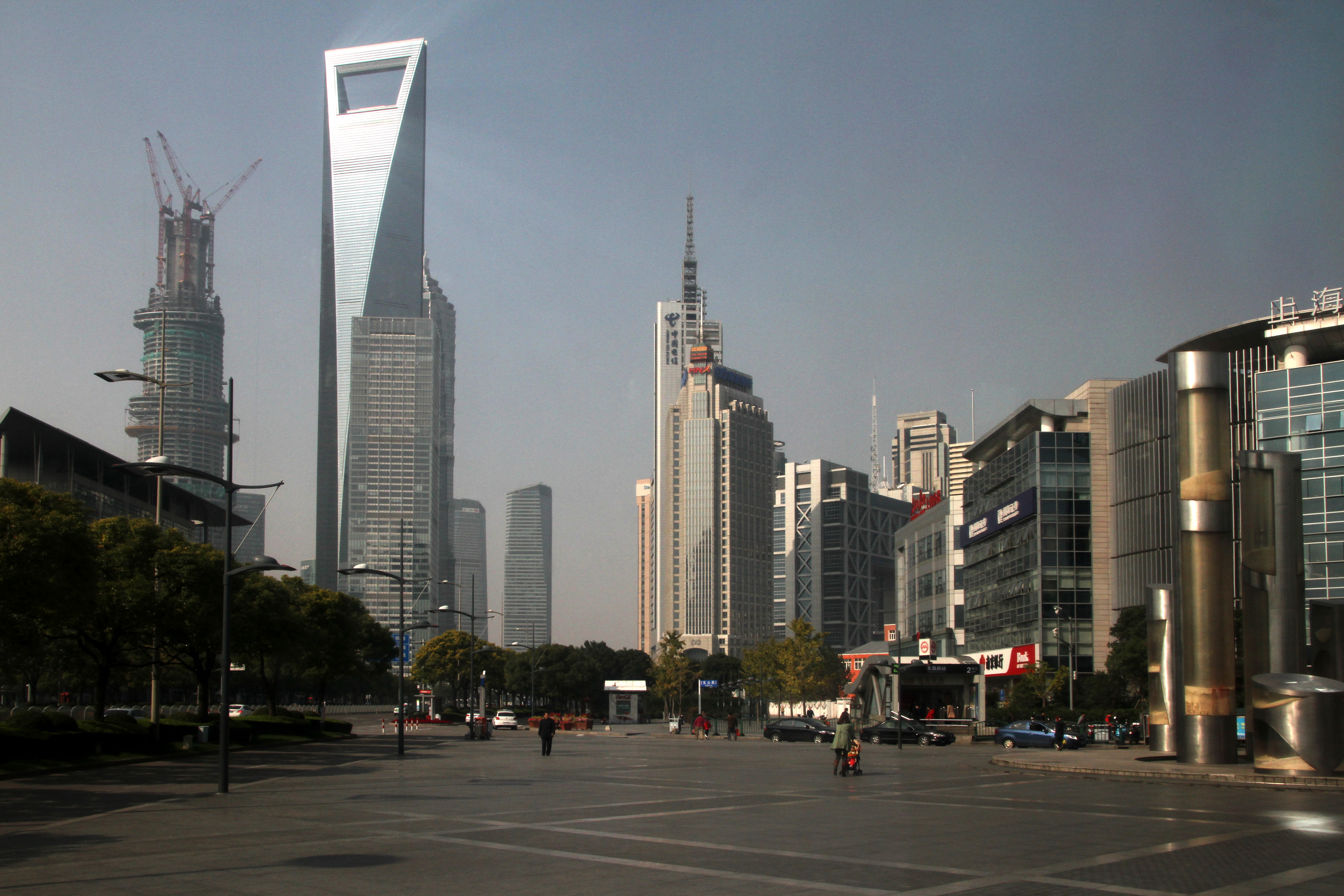
View of Pudong New Area, Shanghai (2012)

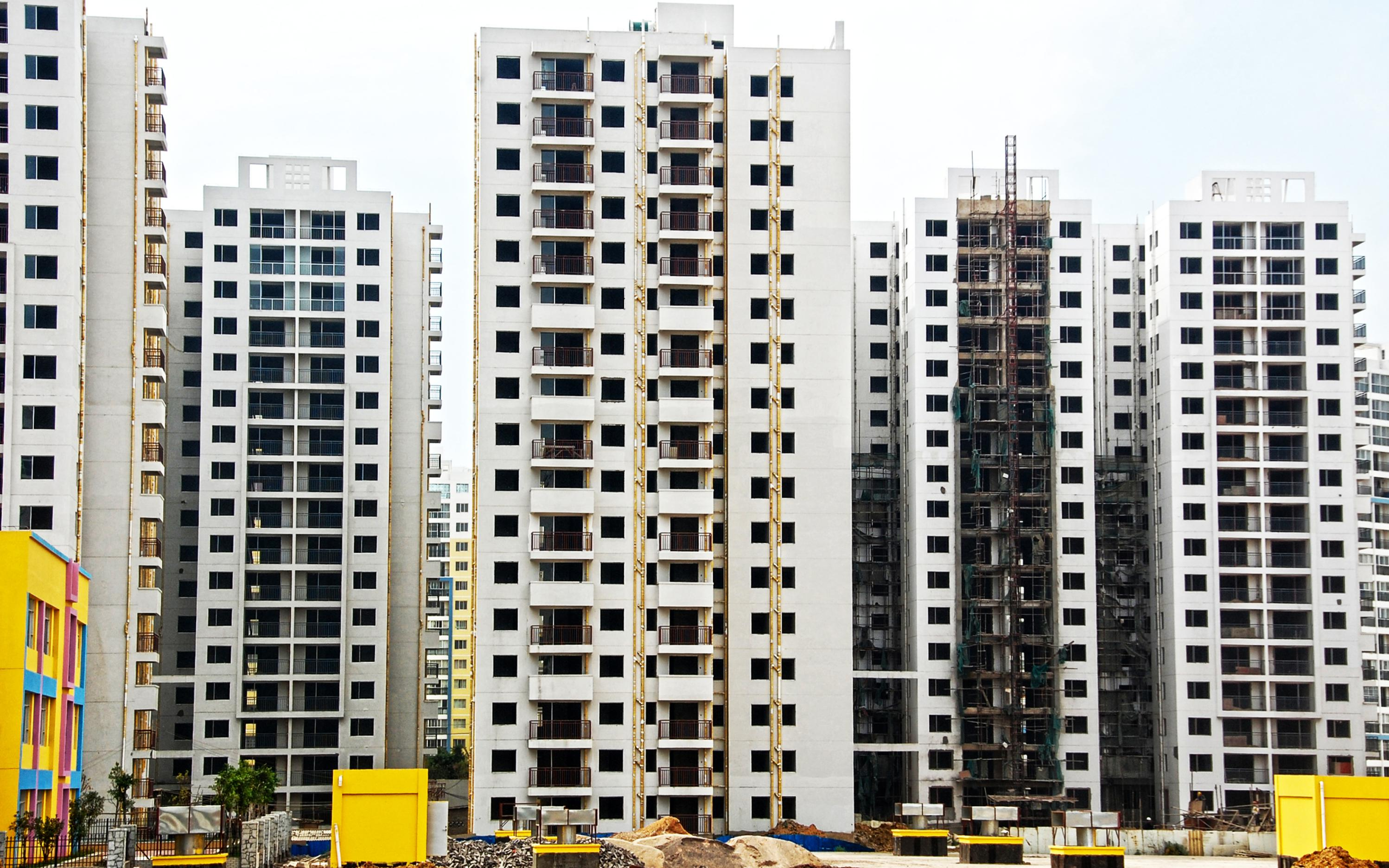
Empty residential complexes in the Chenggong district, Kunming, Yunnan

In China, the idea of "ghost cities" is associated with the proliferation of new town projects under a variety of initiatives like industrial parks, eco-cities, central business districts, and new university towns.

The "ghost city" narrative around Chinese urban development first emerged in Ordos Kangbashi. In 2009, Al Jazeera journalist Melissa Chan reportedly came across the newly built Kangbashi district during a separate assignment. Though approximately 30,000 people already lived in the area, she described it as "empty" and labeled it a ghost town. This narrative quickly spread through international media, fueling Western skepticism about China's economic growth and prompting critics to question the country's GDP figures, suggesting its rapid development was exaggerated or unsustainable.

However, as noted by author Wade Shepard in Forbes, these early reports failed to consider that Kangbashi was just five years old when Chan visited. Wade argued that building a large urban district and achieving partial occupancy in half a decade should be viewed as a significant accomplishment, particularly when compared to infrastructure projects in Western cities, which can take decades to complete. Despite this, Kangbashi's rapid growth was dismissed as an overreach rather than appreciated for its scope and pace. From the beginning, Shepard argued, the ghost city label was a simplistic and misinformed perspective. He also pointed out that in 2017, the "ghost city" label had become increasingly hard to apply to Ordos Kangbashi district as it had since further significantly increased its resident population from 30,000 to 153,000 people living there.

Shepard also explained how property values are structured in China plays a role in the creation of underoccupied new developments. "Economically affordable housing" must be lived in by the owner, and can not be bought and sold as an investment. The developer is only permitted to sell "economically affordable housing" at 5% over the cost of construction. By contrast, "commodity housing" can be bought and sold as an investment. Because housing is a physical object, and China's large population guarantees an ongoing demand for housing, commodity housing is considered a more secure way to store money. Except in some Tier 3 and Tier 4 cities, which have different government regulations, "commodity housing" generally sells as an investment. In addition, these homes typically serve as future homes for the buyer's offspring to live in when they get married.

In 2015, photographer Kai Caemmerer observed the unique approach to urban development in China, where cities are first being constructed to a near-complete state before residents are mass introduced, in contrast to the incremental growth typically seen in U.S. cities.

In a 2021 Bloomberg article, Max Woodworth, an associate professor of geography at Ohio State University, noted that China had experienced significant underurbanization for many years and is now rapidly addressing this issue. Woodworth explained that in 1978, only 18% of China's population lived in urban areas; by 2020, this percentage had increased to 64%. Woodworth indicated that the Chinese government aims to sustain the momentum of urban migration. With strict limits on new arrivals in Beijing and Shanghai, the development of new population centers has become increasingly vital. To enhance urban vitality, the government often facilitates the relocation of government offices and state-owned enterprises to these cities, followed by the establishment of public buildings, schools, and high-speed rail stations, which subsequently attract private investment.

In 2021, Business Insider, reported that in 2020 China had about 65 million empty homes. In the article, academic Xin Sun said in China there is a strong popular belief that real estate is the best way for preserving and generating wealth, leading to great demand for buying property; something the government encourages. The Economist reported that in some areas demand for property greatly outstripped supply, typically in cites. However, at the same time in poorer rural areas few people were buying properties, and in those areas there was a glut of empty houses.

Bloomberg also reported in 2021 that numerous cities including Zhengzhou and Ordos, that had previously been criticized as "ghost cities" in 2010s, have begun to fill up and "stir to life" and become functional cities, and suggested that "China is playing a very long game" when it came to urbanisation.

== Criticism ==
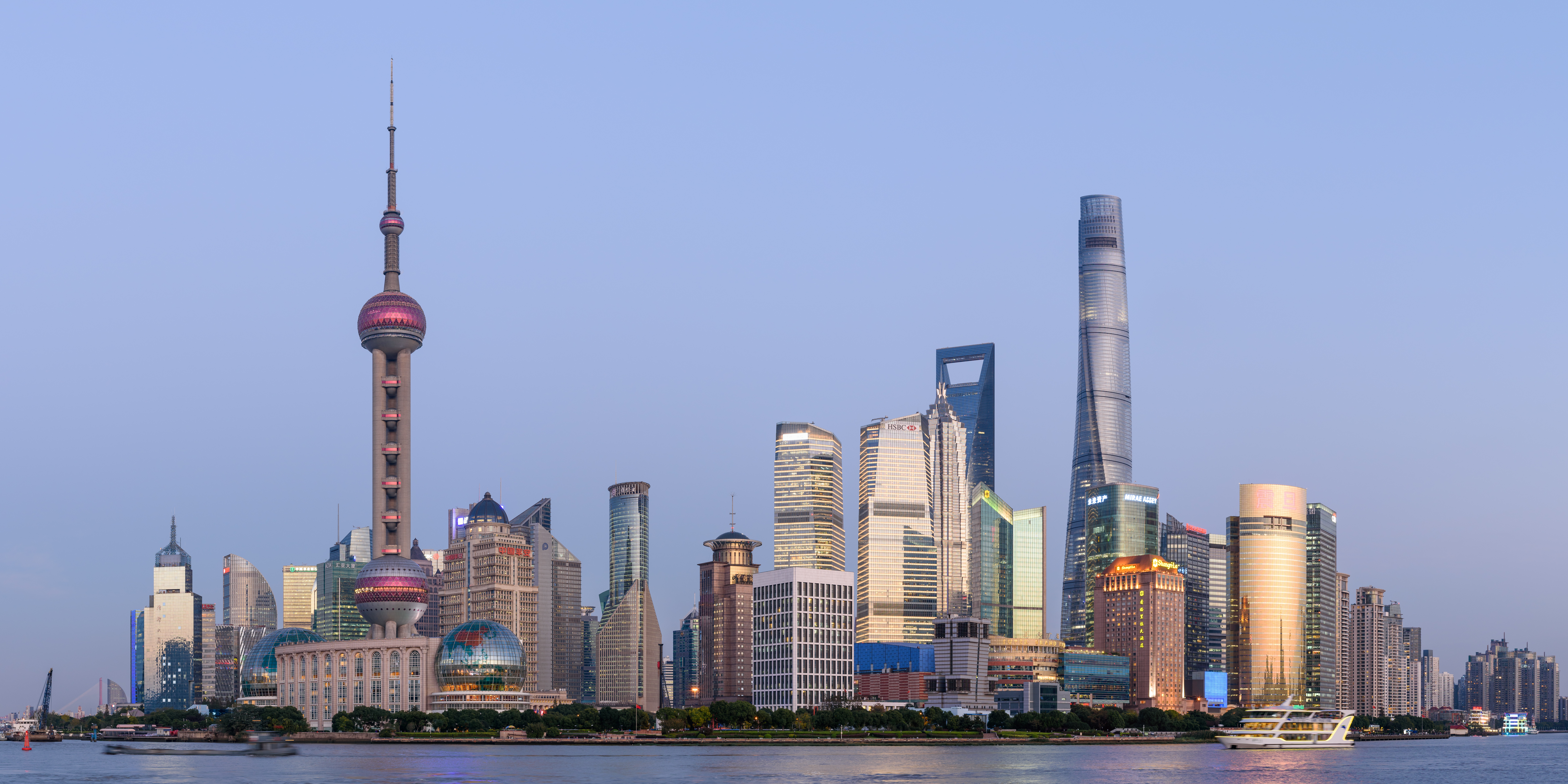
Shanghai's Pudong District was initially criticized as a ghost city.

In 2015, Wade Shepard, author of Ghost Cities of China, criticized the "ghost city" term for focusing too much on the short term results, or "calling the game at halftime". A common assumption by foreign media is that local officials are strictly incentivized to start construction on this newly created urban land to boost GDP growth and look good within the Party. However, Shepard points out that many places which started becoming ghost cities were under the jurisdiction of an area with already strong GDP growth. He argues that these developments are seen as an investment for the future and promote development with timescales of over 20 years.

Kangbashi District in Ordos is often seen as one of the first and most prominent examples of the international Chinese ghost city phenomenon and fascination. Some journalists have pointed to the Ordos Kangbashi ghost city stories as an example of media hastily and often misinformed reporting of developments in China. Such reporting may not convey the perspectives of local officials and experts, and may seek to attract readers unfamiliar with China's development model and bemused at China's perceived backwardness. As of 2015, it was reported that Ordos Kangbashi has a population of 100,000 people, 80 percent of which are full time residents, with the remainder commuting daily from nearby Dongsheng for work.

Circa 2016, Chicago-based photographer Kai Caemmerer investigated and noted the discrepancy between the news reports and actual situation. He noted, "Many of these new cities are not expected to be complete or vibrant until 15-20 years after they begin construction."

=== 2018 onwards ===
Many developments initially criticized as ghost cities did materialize into economically vibrant areas when given enough time to develop, such as Pudong, Zhujiang New Town, Zhengdong New Area, Tianducheng and malls such as the Golden Resources Mall and South China Mall. While many developments failed to live up to initial lofty promises, most of them eventually became occupied when given enough time.

Reporting in 2018, Shepard noted that "Today, China's so-called ghost cities that were so prevalently showcased in 2013 and 2014 are no longer global intrigues. They have filled up to the point of being functioning, normal cities".

Writing in 2023, academic and former UK diplomat Kerry Brown described the idea of Chinese ghost cities as a bandwagon popular in the 2010s which was shown to be a myth.

== List of cities ==
- Chenggong District – the chief zone for the expansion of the city of Kunming. As of 2012, much of the newly constructed housing in Chenggong was still unoccupied, and it is reportedly one of the largest ghost cities in Asia. However, some commentators expect it to become occupied over the next few years, as central Kunming is overcrowded. Some Government departments are to move to Chenggong in 2012, and a subway line to the city center opened in 2013.
- Dantu – has been criticized as being a ghost city by Business Insider in 2010, and described as being "mostly empty" for at least a decade.
- Lanzhou New Area - Designated as China's first state-level economic development zone in the western region, Lanzhou New Area was planned to accommodate 500,000 residents and serve as an industrial and logistics hub. However, early development faced challenges, with only 100,000 residents living there as of 2017, and many buildings remaining unoccupied. The city required large-scale land modification, including mountain-flattening to create space for development, raising environmental concerns related to dust pollution and water scarcity.
- Nanhui New City - Its construction began in 2003 with a budget of $5.6 billion and designed to accommodate 800,000 people after completion in 2020. However as it was initially home to fewer than 50,000 residents, it was described as a "ghost town." To boost population growth, the government later opened a metro station, relocated administrative offices, developed a university town and relocated 100,000 students, built a large marine park, and incorporated the city into the Shanghai Free-Trade Zone. Subsequently, the population has increased to approximately 600,000.
- Ordos City, Kangbashi New Area – in 2009, a reporter from Al Jazeera, had reportedly accidentally visited Kangbashi and despite the city having 30,000 people at the time, had written the place as being a "ghost town". But writing in Forbes in 2017, Wade Shepard had noted that when Al Jazeera had visited Kangbashi, the city back then was a "mere five year old" city, and that it really should "have impressed the world" for being able to build an entirely new city and have it partially populated in half a decade's time. Shepard also noted the population has grown to 153,000 people and housing prices rose with an increase of approximately 50% compared to the end of 2015 when local real estate markets were at its bottom, and around 4,750 businesses were now in operation in the city, and that it was getting harder to justify the label of "ghost city".
- Pudong – one of the first ghost cities, now a prominent global financial district of Shanghai.
- Yingkou – a prefecture level city in Liaoning province. The prefecture level city has five years of unsold apartments with a number of abandoned projects.
- Yujiapu Financial District
- Zhengdong New Area – was deemed as a "ghost city" in a 2013 news report by 60 Minutes, which described the area as having, "new towers with no residents, desolate condos, and vacant subdivisions uninhabited for miles and miles and miles". Though years later, Bloomberg in 2021, had described the area as "bustling with life", and noted that the district's economy has grown at an annual rate of 25% from 2013 to 2018, and the population has grown 27.5% from 2019 to 2020. By 2023 the population of Zhengdong New Area reached 1.3 million people.
- Tianducheng – a town in China designed to resemble Paris, which was initially characterized as a "ghost town" in 2013 due to it being "largely uninhabited". Originally intended to accommodate 10,000 residents, Tianducheng experienced low occupancy during its early years. However, its population has since grown, increasing from approximately 2,000 in 2013 to around 30,000 by 2017. The development has also been expanded multiple times to accommodate the rising demand.

== See also ==
- Chinese property bubble (2005–2011)
- Chinese property sector crisis (2020–present)
- Housing in China
- Real estate in China
- Spatial mismatch
- Caojiawan station
- Category:Ghost towns in China – formerly occupied towns, now abandoned
- Caofeidian, Tangshan - One of China's first eco-city projects, Caofeidian has faced criticism for its environmental impact, land reclamation practices, and limited integration with surrounding communities, raising questions about the sustainability of large-scale urban development.
