= 2025 TCR World Tour =

Motorsport contest

The 2025 Kumho FIA TCR World Tour was the third season of the TCR World Tour, an international touring car racing series for TCR cars. Effectively succeeding the WTCR series, it was also the eleventh season of international TCR competition dating back to the 2015 TCR International Series.

The season consisted of eight events selected from a number of TCR series worldwide.

== Calendar ==
The championship was initially scheduled be contested over 8 rounds in Europe, Asia, Australia and Central America. On 10 December, WTCR announced a return to Australia, after a single-year absence due to logistics issues for teams transporting cars in to the country last year.

| Round | Race | Circuit | Date | Partner championship |
|---|---|---|---|---|
| 1 | 1 | Autódromo Hermanos Rodríguez, Mexico City, Mexico | 2–3 May | TCR Mexico Series |
| 1 | 2 | Autódromo Hermanos Rodríguez, Mexico City, Mexico | 2–3 May | TCR Mexico Series |
| 1 | 3 | Autódromo Hermanos Rodríguez, Mexico City, Mexico | 2–3 May | TCR Mexico Series |
| 2 | 4 | Circuit Ricardo Tormo, Cheste, Spain | 14–15 June | TCR Spain Championship; Porsche Sprint Challenge Iberica |
| 2 | 5 | Circuit Ricardo Tormo, Cheste, Spain | 14–15 June | TCR Spain Championship; Porsche Sprint Challenge Iberica |
| 2 | 6 | Circuit Ricardo Tormo, Cheste, Spain | 14–15 June | TCR Spain Championship; Porsche Sprint Challenge Iberica |
| 3 | 7 | Autodromo Nazionale di Monza, Monza, Lombardy, Italy | 21–22 June | TCR Italian Series |
| 3 | 8 | Autodromo Nazionale di Monza, Monza, Lombardy, Italy | 21–22 June | TCR Italian Series |
| 4 | 9 | Circuito Internacional de Vila Real, Vila Real, Portugal | 5–6 July | SuperCars Endurance Series |
| 4 | 10 | Circuito Internacional de Vila Real, Vila Real, Portugal | 5–6 July | SuperCars Endurance Series |
| 5 | 11 | The Bend Motorsport Park, Tailem Bend, Australia | 12–14 September | TCR Australia Cup; Supercars Championship |
| 5 | 12 | The Bend Motorsport Park, Tailem Bend, Australia | 12–14 September | TCR Australia Cup; Supercars Championship |
| 5 | 13 | The Bend Motorsport Park, Tailem Bend, Australia | 12–14 September | TCR Australia Cup; Supercars Championship |
| 6 | 14 | Inje Speedium, Inje, South Korea | 18–19 October | TCR Asia Series; Hyundai Avante N Cup; Hyundai Veloster N Cup |
| 6 | 15 | Inje Speedium, Inje, South Korea | 18–19 October | TCR Asia Series; Hyundai Avante N Cup; Hyundai Veloster N Cup |
| 6 | 16 | Inje Speedium, Inje, South Korea | 18–19 October | TCR Asia Series; Hyundai Avante N Cup; Hyundai Veloster N Cup |
| 7 | 17 | Zhuzhou International Circuit, Zhuzhou, Hunan, China | 1–2 November | TCR China Touring Car Championship; TCR China Challenge; TCR Asia Series; CTCC China Cup eTCR |
| 7 | 18 | Zhuzhou International Circuit, Zhuzhou, Hunan, China | 1–2 November | TCR China Touring Car Championship; TCR China Challenge; TCR Asia Series; CTCC China Cup eTCR |
| 7 | 19 | Zhuzhou International Circuit, Zhuzhou, Hunan, China | 1–2 November | TCR China Touring Car Championship; TCR China Challenge; TCR Asia Series; CTCC China Cup eTCR |
| 8 | 20 | Guia Circuit, Macau Peninsula, Macau | 13–16 November | Macau Guia Race; FIA FR World Cup; FIA F4 World Cup; FIA GT World Cup; Macau Motorcycle Grand Prix; Macau Roadsport Challenge; SRO GT Cup; TCR Australia Touring Car Series |
| 8 | 21 | Guia Circuit, Macau Peninsula, Macau | 13–16 November | Macau Guia Race; FIA FR World Cup; FIA F4 World Cup; FIA GT World Cup; Macau Motorcycle Grand Prix; Macau Roadsport Challenge; SRO GT Cup; TCR Australia Touring Car Series |
Map of circuit locations
2025 TCR World Tour is located in Earth

== Teams and drivers ==
| Team | Car | No. | Drivers | Class | Rounds | Ref. |
|---|---|---|---|---|---|---|
| (Mexico) ProRally Mothers | Cupra León VZ TCR | 1 | (Mexico) Julio Rejón | W | 1 | |
| (Mexico) ProRally Mothers | Cupra León VZ TCR | 55 | (Mexico) Rodrigo Rejón | W | 1 | |
| (South Korea) KMSA Motorsport N | Hyundai Elantra N TCR | 3 | (South Korea) Choi Jeong Weon | | 6 | |
| (France) JSB Compétition | Hyundai Elantra N TCR (2024) | 4 | (France) Julien Briché | | 2–3 | |
| (France) JSB Compétition | Hyundai Elantra N TCR | 45 | (France) Raphaël Fournier | | 2 | |
| (Australia) HMO Customer Racing | Hyundai Elantra N TCR (2024) | 5 | (Australia) Ryan MacMillan | | 5–8 | |
| (Australia) HMO Customer Racing | Hyundai Elantra N TCR (2024) | 30 | (Australia) Josh Buchan | | 5–6, 8 | |
| (Australia) HMO Customer Racing | Hyundai Elantra N TCR (2024) | 301 | (Australia) Will Brown | | 7 | |
| (Australia) HMO Customer Racing | Hyundai i30 N TCR | 281 | (Hong Kong) Lo Sze Ho | | 5 | |
| (Hong Kong) Evolve Racing | Hyundai i30 N TCR | 281 | (Hong Kong) Lo Sze Ho | | 6 | |
| (Hong Kong) Evolve Racing | Hyundai Elantra N TCR | 281 | (Hong Kong) Lo Sze Ho | | 7–8 | |
| (Sweden) MA:GP | Lynk & Co 03 TCR | 10 | (Sweden) Viktor Andersson | | 2–4 | |
| (Spain) GOAT Racing | Honda Civic Type R TCR (FL5) | 11 | (Italy) Marco Butti | | 2–4 | |
| (Spain) GOAT Racing | Honda Civic Type R TCR (FL5) | 19 | (Spain) Felipe Fernández | | 2–3 | |
| (Spain) GOAT Racing | Honda Civic Type R TCR (FL5) | 62 | (Serbia) Dušan Borković | | 4, 6 | |
| (Spain) GOAT Racing | Honda Civic Type R TCR (FL5) | 123 | (Argentina) Ignacio Montenegro | W | All | |
| (Spain) GOAT Racing | Honda Civic Type R TCR (FL5) | 174 | (Spain) Pepe Oriola | W | 8 | |
| (Spain) GOAT Racing | Honda Civic Type R TCR (FL5) | 186 | (Argentina) Esteban Guerrieri | W | All | |
| (China) Norris Racing with GOAT | Honda Civic Type R TCR (FL5) | 217 | (Hong Kong) Victor Chan | | 7 | |
| (Portugal) J. Santos Competição | Peugeot 308 TCR | 14 | (Luxembourg) Michel Fernandes | | 4 | |
| (Mexico) Peralta Racing Team | Cupra León VZ TCR | 18 | (Mexico) Michel Jourdain Jr. | W | 1 | |
| (Australia) Challenge Motorsport | Audi RS 3 LMS TCR (2017) | 22 | (Australia) Iain McDougall | | 5 | |
| DM23 Ecuador Racing | Honda Civic Type R TCR (FL5) | 23 | (Ecuador) Diego Moran | | 6–7 | |
| (Estonia) ALM Motorsport | Honda Civic Type R TCR (FL5) | 27 | (Estonia) Ruben Volt | | 2–3 | |
| (Estonia) ALM Motorsport | Honda Civic Type R TCR (FL5) | 44 | (Argentina) Leonel Pernía | | 3 | |
| (Spain) Monlau Motorsport | Cupra León VZ TCR | 28 | (Spain) Eric Gené | | 2 | |
| (Australia) Ashley Seward Motorsport | Lynk & Co 03 TCR | 36 | (Australia) Cody Burcher | | 5 | |
| (China) Z.Speed N MAS | Hyundai Elantra N TCR | 56 | (Indonesia) Benny Santoso | | 6–7 | |
| (China) Z.Speed N MAS | Hyundai Elantra N TCR | 86 | (China) Jiang Nan | | 7 | |
| (China) Z.Speed N MAS | Hyundai Elantra N TCR | 297 | (China) Yang Hao Jie | | 7 | |
| (China) Z.Speed N MAS | Hyundai Elantra N TCR | 69 | (Chinese Taipei) Andy Liang | | 8 | |
| (Philippines) Eurasia Motorsport | Hyundai Elantra N TCR | 69 | (Chinese Taipei) Andy Liang | | 6–7 | |
| (Philippines) Eurasia Motorsport | Hyundai Elantra N TCR | 381 | (Philippines) Reignbert G. Diwa | | 6–7 | |
| (Portugal) JT59 Racing Team | Hyundai Elantra N TCR | 59 | (Portugal) Daniel Teixeira | | 4 | |
| (Australia) Harris Motorsports | Honda Civic Type R TCR (FL5) | 74 | (Australia) Brad Harris | | 5 | |
| (France) SP Competition | Cupra León VZ TCR | 77 | (Portugal) Manuel Fernandes Jr. | | 4 | |
| (France) SP Competition | Cupra León VZ TCR | 107 | (France) Aurélien Comte | W | All | |
| (France) SP Competition | Cupra León VZ TCR | 108 | (Republic of Ireland) Max Hart | W | 8 | |
| (France) SP Competition | Cupra León VZ TCR | 127 | (France) John Filippi | W | 1–4 | |
| (Albania) Trico WRT | Hyundai Elantra N TCR | 81 | (Italy) Damiano Reduzzi | | 3 | |
| (Italy) MM Motorsport | Honda Civic Type R TCR (FL5) | 82 | (Italy) Jacopo Cimenes | | 3 | |
| (South Korea) Solite Indigo Racing | Hyundai Elantra N TCR (2024) | 87 | (South Korea) Park Jun-ui | | 6 | |
| (South Korea) Solite Indigo Racing | Hyundai Elantra N TCR | 97 | (South Korea) Park June-sung | | 6 | |
| (Italy) BRC Hyundai N Squadra Corse | Hyundai Elantra N TCR (2024) 1–5, 7–8; Hyundai Elantra N EV TCR 6 | 105 | (Hungary) Norbert Michelisz | W | All | |
| (Italy) BRC Hyundai N Squadra Corse | Hyundai Elantra N TCR (2024) 1–5, 7–8; Hyundai Elantra N EV TCR 6 | 129 | (Argentina) Néstor Girolami | W | All | |
| (Italy) BRC Hyundai N Squadra Corse | Hyundai Elantra N TCR (2024) 1–5, 7–8; Hyundai Elantra N EV TCR 6 | 196 | (Spain) Mikel Azcona | W | All | |
| (Sweden) Lynk & Co Cyan Racing | Lynk & Co 03 FL TCR | 111 | (Sweden) Thed Björk | W | All | |
| (Sweden) Lynk & Co Cyan Racing | Lynk & Co 03 FL TCR | 112 | (Uruguay) Santiago Urrutia | W | All | |
| (Sweden) Lynk & Co Cyan Racing | Lynk & Co 03 FL TCR | 155 | (China) Ma Qing Hua | W | All | |
| (Sweden) Lynk & Co Cyan Racing | Lynk & Co 03 FL TCR | 168 | (France) Yann Ehrlacher | W | All | |
| (Australia) Team Soutar Motorsport | Audi RS 3 LMS TCR (2021) | 210 | (Australia) Zac Soutar | | 5 | |
| (Australia) Garry Rogers Motorsport | Peugeot 308 P51 TCR | 233 | (Australia) Jordan Cox | | 5 | |
| (China) RevX Racing | Audi RS 3 LMS TCR (2021) | 288 | (Chinese Taipei) Sean Chang | | 6–8 | |
| (China) RevX Racing | Audi RS 3 LMS TCR (2021) | 310 | (China) Wang Yi Min | | 7 | |
TCR Mexico entries ineligible to score points
| (Mexico) RE Motorsport | Cupra León VZ TCR | 2 | (Mexico) Santiago Creel | | 1 | |
| (Mexico) RE Motorsport | Cupra León VZ TCR | 2 | (Mexico) José Carlos Sandoval | | 1 | |
| (Mexico) RE Motorsport | Audi RS 3 LMS TCR (2021) | 12 | (Mexico) Gerardo Nieto | | 1 | |
| (Mexico) RE Motorsport | Audi RS 3 LMS TCR (2021) | 12 | (Mexico) Pablo Pérez de Lara | | 1 | |
| (Mexico) RE Motorsport | Audi RS 3 LMS TCR (2021) | 12 | (Romania) Horia Traian Chirigut | | 1 | |
| (Mexico) M&M Racing | Honda Civic Type R TCR (FK8) | 7 | (Mexico) José Luis Hernández | | 1 | |
| (Mexico) M&M Racing | Honda Civic Type R TCR (FK8) | 7 | (Argentina) Ignacio Sánchez | | 1 | |
| (Mexico) Orea Ross Racing | Hyundai Elantra N TCR (2024) | 33 | (United States) Jerónimo Guzmán | | 1 | |
| (Mexico) Orea Ross Racing | Hyundai Elantra N TCR (2024) | 33 | (Mexico) Andrés Orea | | 1 | |
| (Mexico) Orea Ross Racing | Hyundai Elantra N TCR (2024) | 33 | (United States) Todd Sloan | | 1 | |
| (Mexico) Zesati Racing VP Garage 34 | Audi RS 3 LMS TCR (2021) | 34 | (Mexico) Carlo Zesati | | 1 | |
| (Mexico) Zesati Racing VP Garage 34 | Audi RS 3 LMS TCR (2021) | 43 | (Mexico) Bruno Zesati | | 1 | |
| (Mexico) Zesati Racing VP Garage 34 | Audi RS 3 LMS TCR (2021) | 43 | (Mexico) Humberto Zesati | | 1 | |
| (Mexico) Apycsa Racing Team | Audi RS 3 LMS TCR (2021) | 35 | (Mexico) Jorge Abed | | 1 | |
| (Mexico) Apycsa Racing Team | Audi RS 3 LMS TCR (2021) | 35 | (Mexico) Paul Abed | | 1 | |
| (Mexico) Apycsa Racing Team | Audi RS 3 LMS TCR (2021) | 35 | (Mexico) Mario Domínguez | | 1 | |
| (Mexico) Orangino Racing Team | Hyundai Elantra N TCR | 44 | (Mexico) César Tiberio Jiménez | | 1 | |
| (Mexico) Zanella Racing Team | Cupra León Competición TCR | 45 | (Mexico) Franco Zanella | | 1 | |
| (Mexico) Zanella Racing Team | Cupra León Competición TCR | 45 | (Mexico) Santos Zanella Jr. | | 1 | |
| (Mexico) Centur Silen Petrol Racing | Cupra León VZ TCR | 88 | (Mexico) Pablo Cervantes | | 1 | |
| (Mexico) Centur Silen Petrol Racing | Cupra León VZ TCR | 88 | (Mexico) Juan Pablo Sierra | | 1 | |

| Icon | Status |
|---|---|
| W | TCR World Tour entries not eligible to score points in the local series |

== Results ==
| Rnd. | | Circuit/Location | Pole position | Fastest lap | Winning driver | Winning team |
|---|---|---|---|---|---|---|
| 1 | 1 | (Mexico) Autódromo Hermanos Rodríguez | (Argentina) Esteban Guerrieri | (France) Yann Ehrlacher | (Sweden) Thed Björk | (Sweden) Lynk & Co Cyan Racing |
| 1 | 2 | (Mexico) Autódromo Hermanos Rodríguez | | (Argentina) Esteban Guerrieri | (Argentina) Esteban Guerrieri | (Spain) GOAT Racing |
| 1 | 3 | (Mexico) Autódromo Hermanos Rodríguez | | (Argentina) Esteban Guerrieri | (Argentina) Esteban Guerrieri | (Spain) GOAT Racing |
| 2 | 4 | (Spain) Circuit Ricardo Tormo | (Uruguay) Santiago Urrutia | (China) Ma Qing Hua | (France) Yann Ehrlacher | (Sweden) Lynk & Co Cyan Racing |
| 2 | 5 | (Spain) Circuit Ricardo Tormo | | (France) Aurélien Comte | (Argentina) Néstor Girolami | (Italy) BRC Hyundai N Squadra Corse |
| 2 | 6 | (Spain) Circuit Ricardo Tormo | | (Uruguay) Santiago Urrutia | (France) Yann Ehrlacher | (Sweden) Lynk & Co Cyan Racing |
| 3 | 7 | (Italy) Autodromo Nazionale di Monza | (Hungary) Norbert Michelisz | (France) Aurélien Comte | (Hungary) Norbert Michelisz | (Italy) BRC Hyundai N Squadra Corse |
| 3 | 8 | (Italy) Autodromo Nazionale di Monza | | (France) Aurélien Comte | (France) Aurélien Comte | (France) SP Competition |
| 4 | 9 | (Portugal) Circuito Internacional de Vila Real | (France) Yann Ehrlacher | (Argentina) Ignacio Montenegro | (France) Yann Ehrlacher | (Sweden) Lynk & Co Cyan Racing |
| 4 | 10 | (Portugal) Circuito Internacional de Vila Real | | (China) Ma Qing Hua | (Sweden) Thed Björk | (Sweden) Lynk & Co Cyan Racing |
| 5 | 11 | (Australia) The Bend Motorsport Park | | Cancelled due to shipping delays | | |
| 5 | 12 | (Australia) The Bend Motorsport Park | (Spain) Mikel Azcona | (Spain) Mikel Azcona | (Hungary) Norbert Michelisz | (Italy) BRC Hyundai N Squadra Corse |
| 5 | 13 | (Australia) The Bend Motorsport Park | | (Argentina) Néstor Girolami | (Argentina) Néstor Girolami | (Italy) BRC Hyundai N Squadra Corse |
| 6 | 14 | (South Korea) Inje Speedium | (Sweden) Thed Björk (Note: Thed Björk set the fastest time in qualifying but received a 3-place grid penalty for causing an incident during the session. Josh Buchan, who set the second fastest time, was promoted to pole position.) | (Sweden) Thed Björk (Note: Esteban Guerrieri and Thed Björk set identical fastest laps in this race. Björk was credited with the fastest lap by virtue of setting his lap first.) | (Australia) Josh Buchan | (Australia) HMO Customer Racing |
| 6 | 15 | (South Korea) Inje Speedium | | (Spain) Mikel Azcona | (Spain) Mikel Azcona | (Italy) BRC Hyundai N Squadra Corse |
| 6 | 16 | (South Korea) Inje Speedium | | (Sweden) Thed Björk | (Sweden) Thed Björk | (Sweden) Lynk & Co Cyan Racing |
| 7 | 17 | (China) Zhuzhou International Circuit | (France) Aurélien Comte | (Sweden) Thed Björk | (France) Aurélien Comte | (France) SP Competition |
| 7 | 18 | (China) Zhuzhou International Circuit | | (Uruguay) Santiago Urrutia | (France) Yann Ehrlacher | (Sweden) Lynk & Co Cyan Racing |
| 7 | 19 | (China) Zhuzhou International Circuit | | (France) Aurélien Comte | (France) Aurélien Comte | (France) SP Competition |
| 8 | 20 | (Macau) Guia Circuit | (Argentina) Néstor Girolami | (Spain) Mikel Azcona | (Argentina) Néstor Girolami | (Italy) BRC Hyundai N Squadra Corse |
| 8 | 21 | (Macau) Guia Circuit | | (Republic of Ireland) Max Hart | (Australia) Josh Buchan | (Australia) HMO Customer Racing |

== Points standings ==
Scoring system

| Position | 1st | 2nd | 3rd | 4th | 5th | 6th | 7th | 8th | 9th | 10th | 11th | 12th | 13th | 14th | 15th |
| Qualifying | 15 | 10 | 8 | 6 | 4 | 2 | —N/a | | | | | | | | |
| Races | 30 | 25 | 22 | 20 | 18 | 16 | 14 | 12 | 10 | 8 | 6 | 4 | 3 | 2 | 1 |

=== Drivers ===
| Pos. | Driver | MEX (Mexico) | | | ESP (Spain) | | | ITA (Italy) | | POR (Portugal) | | AUS (Australia) | | | KOR (South Korea) | | | CHN (China) | | | MAC (Macau) | | Pts. |
|---|---|---|---|---|---|---|---|---|---|---|---|---|---|---|---|---|---|---|---|---|---|---|---|
| 1 | (France) Yann Ehrlacher | 3^{2} | 2 | 16 | 1^{2} | 3 | 1 | 2^{4} | 9 | 1^{1} | 8 | C | 3^{3} | 6 | 4^{3} | 2 | 2 | 5^{6} | 1 | 3 | 3^{2} | 11 | 484 |
| 2 | (Sweden) Thed Björk | 1^{3} | 4 | 2 | 5 | 9 | 10 | 3 | 3 | 7 | 1 | C | 5^{5} | 7 | 3^{1} | 3 | 1 | 2^{2} | 4 | 2 | 5^{3} | 3 | 460 |
| 3 | (Argentina) Esteban Guerrieri | 4^{1} | 1 | 1 | 8 | 5 | 4 | 5 | 7 | 3^{3} | 6 | C | 8 | 2 | 2^{6} | 4 | 3 | 8 | Ret | 12 | 4^{6} | 5 | 385 |
| 4 | (Uruguay) Santiago Urrutia | 2^{5} | 5 | 3 | 2^{1} | 8 | 2 | Ret^{5} | 6 | 2^{2} | 7 | C | 12 | 11 | 5^{5} | 6 | 5 | 10 | 5 | 5 | 10 | 15 | 334 |
| 5 | (China) Ma Qing Hua | 6 | 6 | 6 | 3^{3} | 10 | 7 | Ret | 10 | 6 | 2 | C | 6 | 8 | 9^{4} | 7 | 8 | 6^{5} | 7 | 9 | 6 | 2 | 304 |
| 6 | (Argentina) Néstor Girolami | 11 | 11 | 13 | 6 | 1 | 3 | 6 | 2 | 8 | 10 | C | 10 | 1 | 17 | 10 | 15 | 9 | 3 | 7 | 1^{1} | 6 | 299 |
| 7 | (France) Aurélien Comte | 5^{6} | 3 | 5 | 14 | 16 | 13 | Ret^{3} | 1 | 4^{5} | 4 | C | 11 | 4 | 6 | Ret | 7 | 1^{1} | 10 | 1 | 12 | 12 | 294 |
| 8 | (Hungary) Norbert Michelisz | 18 | 16 | 12 | 4^{5} | 11 | 5 | 1^{1} | 4 | 5^{6} | 13 | C | 1^{2} | 9 | 10 | 8 | 9 | 3^{3} | 12 | 8 | Ret^{4} | 8 | 290 |
| 9 | (Spain) Mikel Azcona | 10 | 17 | 22 | 16 | 7 | 9 | 10^{2} | 11 | 11^{4} | 5 | C | 2^{1} | 10 | 10 | 1 | 4 | 7 | 2 | 10 | 2 | 13 | 273 |
| 10 | (Argentina) Ignacio Montenegro | Ret^{4} | 7 | 4 | Ret^{4} | 6 | 8 | 4 | 5 | 9 | 3 | C | 7^{6} | 3 | 7 | 11 | 10 | 11 | 8 | Ret | 15^{5} | 4 | 253 |
| 11 | (Australia) Josh Buchan | | | | | | | | | | | C | 4^{4} | 5 | 1^{2} | 9 | 6 | | | | 7 | 1 | 154 |
| 12 | (Australia) Will Brown | | | | | | | | | | | | | | | | | 4^{4} | 6 | 4 | | | 62 |
| 13 | (Estonia) Ruben Volt | | | | 7 | 2 | 6 | 13^{6} | 16 | | | | | | | | | | | | | | 60 |
| 14 | (France) John Filippi | 12 | 10 | 9 | 10 | 4 | 11 | Ret | Ret | WD | WD | | | | | | | | | | | | 56 |
| 15 | (Australia) Ryan MacMillan | | | | | | | | | | | C | 15 | 12 | 12 | 12 | 12 | 12 | 13 | 6 | 13 | 9 | 53 |
| 16 | (Hong Kong) Lo Sze Ho | | | | | | | | | | | C | 17 | 15 | Ret | 14 | 13 | 13 | 9 | 11 | 8 | 10 | 45 |
| 17 | (Serbia) Dušan Borković | | | | | | | | | Ret | 9 | | | | 8 | 5 | 14 | | | | | | 42 |
| 18 | (Mexico) Michel Jourdain Jr. | 8 | 8 | 7 | | | | | | | | | | | | | | | | | | | 38 |
| 19 | (Mexico) Rodrigo Rejón | 9 | 9 | 8 | | | | | | | | | | | | | | | | | | | 32 |
| 20 | (Sweden) Viktor Andersson | | | | 11 | 13 | 12 | 9 | 14 | NC | 11 | | | | | | | | | | | | 31 |
| 21 | (Italy) Marco Butti | | | | Ret | 12 | 15 | 11 | 8 | 13 | 15 | | | | | | | | | | | | 27 |
| 22 | (Republic of Ireland) Max Hart | | | | | | | | | | | | | | | | | | | | 9 | 7 | 24 |
| 23 | (Mexico) Julio Rejón | 7 | Ret | 10 | | | | | | | | | | | | | | | | | | | 22 |
| 24 | (Italy) Damiano Reduzzi | | | | | | | 7 | 12 | | | | | | | | | | | | | | 18 |
| 25 | (Italy) Jacopo Cimenes | | | | | | | 8 | 13 | | | | | | | | | | | | | | 15 |
| 26 | (Spain) Felipe Fernandez | | | | 9 | 15 | 14 | 14 | 17 | | | | | | | | | | | | | | 15 |
| 27 | (Portugal) Daniel Teixeira | | | | | | | | | 10 | 12 | | | | | | | | | | | | 12 |
| 28 | (Australia) Cody Burcher | | | | | | | | | | | C | 9 | Ret | | | | | | | | | 10 |
| 29 | (Ecuador) Diego Moran | | | | | | | | | | | | | | 13 | 13 | 17 | 18 | DNS | 13 | | | 9 |
| 30 | (Hong Kong) Victor Chan | | | | | | | | | | | | | | | | | 14 | 11 | Ret | | | 8 |
| 31 | (South Korea) Park June-sung | | | | | | | | | | | | | | 20 | Ret | 11 | | | | | | 6 |
| 32 | (Spain) Pepe Oriola | | | | | | | | | | | | | | | | | | | | 11 | Ret | 6 |
| 33 | (Luxembourg) Michel Fernandes | | | | | | | | | 12 | 14 | | | | | | | | | | | | 6 |
| 34 | (Australia) Zac Soutar | | | | | | | | | | | C | 13 | 13 | | | | | | | | | 6 |
| 35 | (Argentina) Leonel Pernía | | | | | | | 12 | 15 | | | | | | | | | | | | | | 5 |
| 36 | (France) Raphael Fournier | | | | 13 | 14 | 16 | | | | | | | | | | | | | | | | 5 |
| 37 | (France) Julien Briché | | | | 12 | Ret | 17 | | | | | | | | | | | | | | | | 4 |
| 38 | (Chinese Taipei) Sean Chang | | | | | | | | | | | | | | 18 | 16 | 19 | 16 | 16 | 17 | 14 | 14 | 4 |
| 39 | (Indonesia) Benny Santoso | | | | | | | | | | | | | | 16 | 18 | 20 | 15 | 14 | 15 | | | 4 |
| 40 | (South Korea) Choi Jeongweon | | | | | | | | | | | | | | 14 | 15 | 18 | | | | | | 3 |
| 41 | (Spain) Eric Gené | | | | 15^{6} | Ret | Ret | | | | | | | | | | | | | | | | 3 |
| 42 | (Australia) Jordan Cox | | | | | | | | | | | C | 16 | 14 | | | | | | | | | 2 |
| 43 | (China) Jiang Nan | | | | | | | | | | | | | | | | | 17 | 18 | 14 | | | 2 |
| 44 | (Australia) Brad Harris | | | | | | | | | | | C | 14 | Ret | | | | | | | | | 2 |
| 45 | (China) Yang Hao Jie | | | | | | | | | | | | | | | | | 21 | 15 | 16 | | | 1 |
| 46 | (South Korea) Park Jun-ui | | | | | | | | | | | | | | 15 | Ret | 16 | | | | | | 1 |
| 47 | (Chinese Taipei) Andy Liang | | | | | | | | | | | | | | 19 | 19 | 22 | 19 | DNS | DNS | 16 | 16 | 0 |
| 48 | (Australia) Iain McDougall | | | | | | | | | | | C | 18 | 16 | | | | | | | | | 0 |
| 49 | (Philippines) Reignbert G. Diwa | | | | | | | | | | | | | | 21 | 17 | 21 | 20 | 17 | Ret | | | 0 |
| 50 | (China) Wang Yi Min | | | | | | | | | | | | | | | | | 22 | 19 | 18 | | | 0 |
| – | (Portugal) Manuel Fernandes Jr. | | | | | | | | | DNS | DNS | | | | | | | | | | | | – |
TCR National series entries ineligible for points
| | (Mexico) Carlo Zesati | 13 | 13 | 11 | | | | | | | | | | | | | | | | | | | |
| | (Mexico) José Carlos Sandoval | | 12 | | | | | | | | | | | | | | | | | | | | |
| | (Mexico) Juan Pablo Sierra | 14 | | | | | | | | | | | | | | | | | | | | | |
| | (Mexico) Pablo Pérez de Lara | | | 14 | | | | | | | | | | | | | | | | | | | |
| | (Mexico) Pablo Cervantes | | 14 | 23 | | | | | | | | | | | | | | | | | | | |
| | (Mexico) Gerardo Nieto | | 15 | | | | | | | | | | | | | | | | | | | | |
| | (Mexico) Santos Zanella Jr. | | | 15 | | | | | | | | | | | | | | | | | | | |
| | (Mexico) Franco Zanella | 15 | Ret | | | | | | | | | | | | | | | | | | | | |
| | (Mexico) Santiago Creel | 16 | | 17 | | | | | | | | | | | | | | | | | | | |
| | (Mexico) César Tiberio Jiménez | 17 | 19 | 19 | | | | | | | | | | | | | | | | | | | |
| | (United States) Jerónimo Guzmán | | 18 | | | | | | | | | | | | | | | | | | | | |
| | (Mexico) Andrés Orea | | | 18 | | | | | | | | | | | | | | | | | | | |
| | (United States) Todd Sloan | 19 | | | | | | | | | | | | | | | | | | | | | |
| | (Mexico) Jorge Abed | | | 20 | | | | | | | | | | | | | | | | | | | |
| | (Romania) Horia Traian Chirigut | 20 | | | | | | | | | | | | | | | | | | | | | |
| | (Mexico) Bruno Zesati | | 20 | | | | | | | | | | | | | | | | | | | | |
| | (Mexico) Paul Abed | | 21 | | | | | | | | | | | | | | | | | | | | |
| | (Mexico) Humberto Zesati | 21 | | Ret | | | | | | | | | | | | | | | | | | | |
| | (Mexico) José Luis Hernández | | Ret | 21 | | | | | | | | | | | | | | | | | | | |
| | (Argentina) Ignacio Sánchez | 22 | | | | | | | | | | | | | | | | | | | | | |
| | (Mexico) Mario Domínguez | 23 | | | | | | | | | | | | | | | | | | | | | |
| Pos. | Driver | MEX (Mexico) | | | ESP (Spain) | | | ITA (Italy) | | POR (Portugal) | | AUS (Australia) | | | KOR (South Korea) | | | CHN (China) | | | MAC (Macau) | | Pts. |

| Colour | Result |
|---|---|
| Gold | Winner |
| Silver | Second place |
| Bronze | Third place |
| Green | Points classification |
| Blue | Non-points classification |
| Blue | Non-classified finish (NC) |
| Purple | Retired, not classified (Ret) |
| Red | Did not qualify (DNQ) |
| Red | Did not pre-qualify (DNPQ) |
| Black | Disqualified (DSQ) |
| White | Did not start (DNS) |
| White | Withdrew (WD) |
| White | Race cancelled (C) |
| Blank | Did not practice (DNP) |
| Blank | Did not arrive (DNA) |
| Blank | Excluded (EX) |

^{1} ^{2} ^{3} ^{4} ^{5} ^{6} – Points-scoring position in qualifying

† – Drivers did not finish the race, but were classified as they completed over 75% of the race distance.

=== Teams (top 5) ===
Points are given only to the two highest-classified cars of each team in every race and qualifying.

| Pos. | Team | Points |
|---|---|---|
| 1 | (Sweden) Lynk & Co Cyan Racing | 544 |
| 2 | (Spain) GOAT Racing | 367 |
| 2 | (Italy) BRC Hyundai N Squadra Corse | 338 |
| 4 | (France) SP Compétition | 203 |
| 5 | (Estonia) ALM Motorsport | 65 |
