= 2025 TCR China Touring Car Championship =

Motorsport season

The 2025 TCR China Touring Car Championship season was the eighth season of the TCR's Chinese Touring Car Championship.

== Calendar ==
The provisional 2025 schedule was announced on 12 February 2025, with six events scheduled. The season began at Shanghai International Circuit on 25 April and finished at Hunan International Circuit on 2 November. The final round was also part of the TCR World Tour & TCR Asia.

Part of the TCR China Challenge

Rnd.		Circuit	Date	Supporting
1	1	(China) Shanghai International Circuit, Jiading, Shanghai	25–27 April	TCR Asia Series; TCR China Challenge; China GT Championship; CTCC China Cup; Lynk & Co Auto Challenge
1	2	(China) Shanghai International Circuit, Jiading, Shanghai	25–27 April	TCR Asia Series; TCR China Challenge; China GT Championship; CTCC China Cup; Lynk & Co Auto Challenge
2	3	(China) Ningbo International Circuit, Beilun, Ningbo	9–11 May	TCR Asia Series; TCR China Challenge; CTCC China Cup
2	4	(China) Ningbo International Circuit, Beilun, Ningbo	9–11 May	TCR Asia Series; TCR China Challenge; CTCC China Cup
3	5	(China) Zhejiang International Circuit, Zhejiang, Shaoxing	27–29 June	CTCC China Cup
3	6	(China) Zhejiang International Circuit, Zhejiang, Shaoxing	27–29 June	CTCC China Cup
4	7	(China) Ordos International Circuit, Kangbashi, Ordos City	8–10 August	CTCC China Cup
4	8	(China) Ordos International Circuit, Kangbashi, Ordos City	8–10 August	CTCC China Cup
5	9	(China) Shanghai International Circuit, Jiading, Shanghai	19–21 September	China GT Championship; CTCC China Cup; Lynk & Co Auto Challenge
5	10	(China) Shanghai International Circuit, Jiading, Shanghai	19–21 September	China GT Championship; CTCC China Cup; Lynk & Co Auto Challenge
6	11	(China) Hunan International Circuit, Zhuzhou, Hunan	31 October–2 November	TCR World Tour; TCR Asia; CTCC China Cup eTCR
6	12	(China) Hunan International Circuit, Zhuzhou, Hunan	31 October–2 November	TCR World Tour; TCR Asia; CTCC China Cup eTCR

== Results ==
Rnd.		Circuit	Pole position	Winning driver
1	1	(China) Shanghai International Circuit, Shanghai	(China) 张臻东 | ZHANG Zhendong	(China) 张臻东 | ZHANG Zhendong
1	2	(China) Shanghai International Circuit, Shanghai		(China) 张臻东 | ZHANG Zhendong
2	3	(China) Ningbo International Circuit, Ningbo, Zhejiang	(China) 朱戴维 | David ZHU Daiwei	(China) 朱戴维 | David ZHU Daiwei
2	4	(China) Ningbo International Circuit, Ningbo, Zhejiang		(China) 张臻东 | ZHANG Zhendong
3	5	(China) Zhejiang International Circuit, Shaoxing, Zhejiang	(China) 张志强 | Jason ZHANG Zhiqiang	(China) 张志强 | Jason ZHANG Zhiqiang
3	6	(China) Zhejiang International Circuit, Shaoxing, Zhejiang		(China) 张臻东 | ZHANG Zhendong
4	7	(China) Ordos International Circuit, Ordos, Inner Mongolia	(China) 朱戴维 | David ZHU Daiwei	(China) 张志强 | Jason ZHANG Zhiqiang
4	8	(China) Ordos International Circuit, Ordos, Inner Mongolia		(China) 朱戴维 | David ZHU Daiwei
5	9	(China) Shanghai International Circuit, Shanghai	(China) 朱戴维 | David ZHU Daiwei	(China) 邓保维 | David DENG Baowei
5	10	(China) Shanghai International Circuit, Shanghai		(China) 张志强 | Jason ZHANG Zhiqiang
6	11	(China) Hunan International Circuit, Zhuzhou, Hunan	(China) 张志强 | Jason ZHANG Zhiqiang	(China) 张志强 | Jason ZHANG Zhiqiang
6	12	(China) Hunan International Circuit, Zhuzhou, Hunan		(China) 张志强 | Jason ZHANG Zhiqiang

== Championship standings ==
Scoring system

Position	1st	2nd	3rd	4th	5th	6th	7th	8th	9th	10th	11th	12th	13th	14th	15th
Qualifying	10	7	5	4	3	2	1								
Races	40	35	30	27	24	21	18	15	13	11	9	7	5	3	1

=== Drivers' championship ===
David ZHU Daiwei secured the championship title in the final race of the season by just one point. After the final race, David Zhu was promoted to the podium following post-race penalties. In the end, only four points separated David Zhu and Jason Zhang.

Pos.	Driver	SHI1 (China)		NIC (China)		ZIC (China)		OIC (China)		SHI2 (China)		HIC (China)		Pts.
Pos.	Driver	RD1	RD2	RD1	RD2	RD1	RD2	RD1	RD2	RD1	RD2	RD1	RD2	Pts.
1	(China) David Zhu	4^{4}	2	1^{1}	2	3^{2}	3	2^{1}	1	2^{1}	2	2^{3}	3	451
2	(China) Jason Zhang	3^{3}	3	2^{3}	3	1^{1}	2	1^{2}	2	10^{4}	1	1^{1}	1	447
3	(China) Zhang Zhendong	1^{1}	1	3^{6}	1	2^{3}	1	4^{3}	6					297
4	(China) Sunny Wong	9	6	4^{2}	Ret	5^{6}	6	3^{6}	3	5	7	3^{5}	6	274
5	(China) Li Guanghua	10	11	6^{5}	4	6	4	10^{5}	4	4^{2}	6	Ret	Ret	221
6	(China) WU Yifan	2^{2}	Ret	8^{7}	5	7	15	5	Ret	6^{7}	13	5^{6}	5	214
7	(Hong Kong) Paul POON Tak Chun	Ret	9	5^{4}	Ret	4^{4}	5	8	5	3^{5}	3	Ret^{2}	19	212
8	(China) HU Heng	12	17	12	12	16	8	15	9	7	5	6	2	164
9	(China) HUANG Ying	8	5	14	6	Ret	22	9	10	Ret	9	7	10	141
10	(Macau) HO Wai Kun	5^{5}	4	9	7									85
11	(China) LAI Jinwen	Ret^{6}	7	10	8	10	7							82
12	(China) David DENG Baowei (Note: The first two race weekends were not counted towards his championship standings.)	16	13	7	13					1^{3}	4			72
13	(China) LIU Hongzhi	13	15	16	Ret	21	16?	11	Ret	15	Ret	13	7	56
14	(China) Tony CHAN Chi Wai	14	12	13	11	Ret	11	Ret	Ret	12	10	Ret	Ret	53
15	(China) GAO Ya Ou			15	15	Ret	DNS	12	14	8	Ret	11	Ret	50
16	(China) ZHOU YunJie	Ret	10	Ret	Ret	14	9			13	11	21	Ret	42
17	(China) LO Sze Ho													36
18	(China) ZHU Cheng													35
19	(China) HE Yuan													32
20	(China) Frederick LEE Fu Kwan													31
21	(China) SUN Ju Ran													29
22	(China) WAN Siu Ming													20
23	(China) CHEN Fangping													20
24	(China) ZHANG Wentao													20
25	(China) LEONG Kenghei													19
26	(China) LO Ka Chun													18
27	(China) Max SANG Sien													17
28	(China) FU Bin													14
29	(China) LU Weiqi													14
30	(Macau) Andre Couto													13
31	(China) LIN Zhishan													6
32	(China) LIN Xuejun													1
33	(China) ZHAO Di													1
34	(China) TANG Chi Lun													0
35	(China) WANG Yimin													0
Pos.	Driver	SHI1 (China)		NIC (China)		ZIC (China)		OIC (China)		SHI2 (China)		HIC (China)		Pts.

Colour	Result
Gold	Winner
Silver	Second place
Bronze	Third place
Green	Points classification
Blue	Non-points classification
Blue	Non-classified finish (NC)
Purple	Retired, not classified (Ret)
Red	Did not qualify (DNQ)
Red	Did not pre-qualify (DNPQ)
Black	Disqualified (DSQ)
White	Did not start (DNS)
White	Withdrew (WD)
White	Race cancelled (C)
Blank	Did not practice (DNP)
Blank	Did not arrive (DNA)
Blank	Excluded (EX)

^{1 2 3 4 5 6 7} – Qualifying position
