= Jesse Krohn =

Finnish racing driver (born 1990)

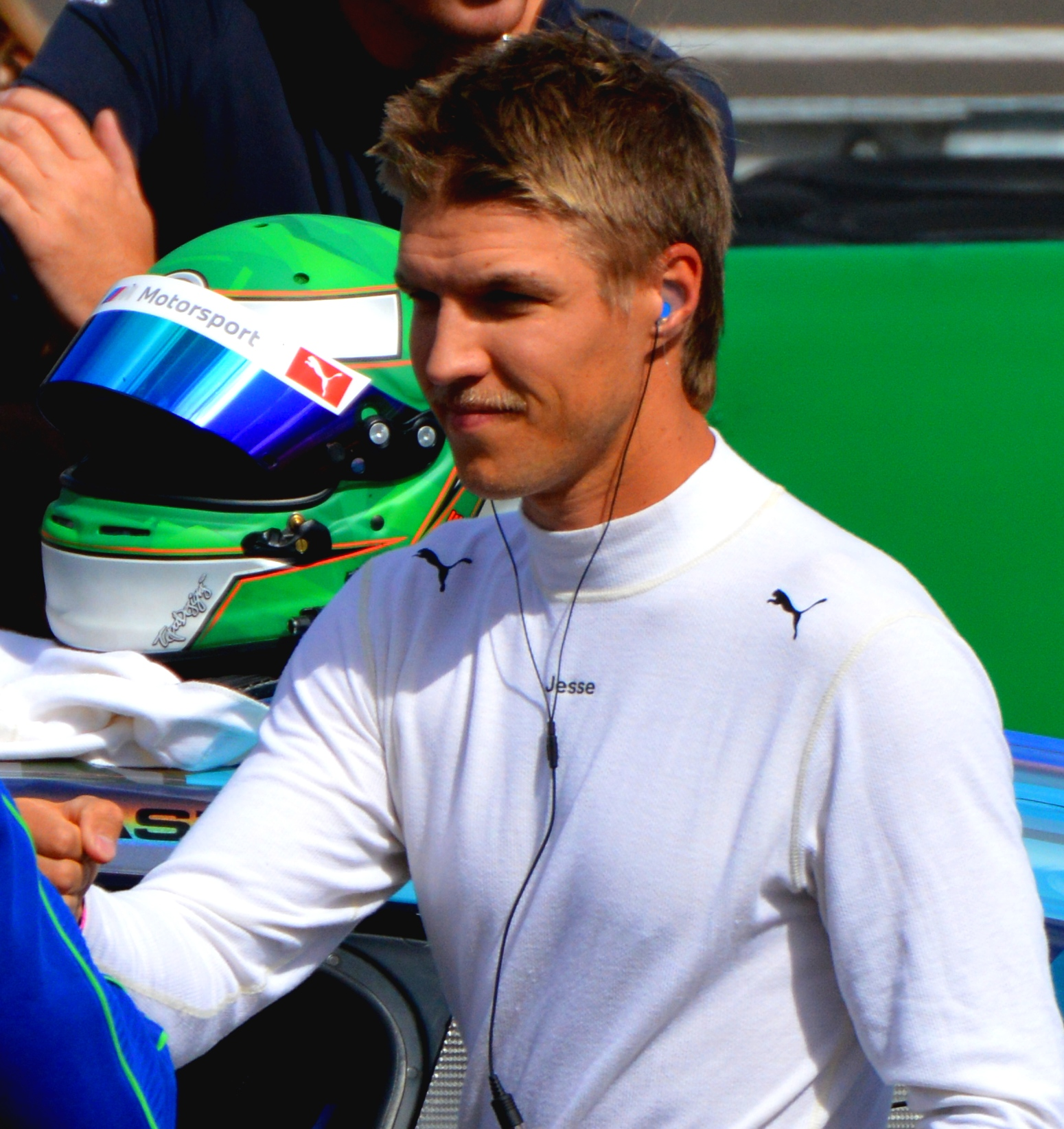
- Krohn at the Brno Circuit in 2025
- Nationality: (Finland) Finnish
- Born: Jesse Eemil Kurki-Suonio; 3 September 1990 (age 36) Nurmijärvi (Finland)
- Relatives: Pertti Kurki-Suonio (Father); Jenni Krohn (Sister); Oskari Kurki-Suonio (Brother)

Italian Formula Three career
- Debut season: 2010
- Current team: RP Motorsport
- Categorisation: FIA Silver (until 2017); FIA Gold (2018–)
- Car number: 21

Previous series
- 2006 2007 2007 2008 2008 2008 2009: Formula Ford Finland; Formula Ford UK; Finnish Formula Three; Formula Renault Finland; Formula Renault NEZ; Formula Renault Estonia; Formula Renault UK

Championship titles
- 2008 2008 2008: Formula Renault Finland; Formula Renault NEZ; Formula Renault Estonia

Jesse Eemil Kurki-Suonio (born 3 September 1990), more commonly known as Jesse Krohn, is a Finnish professional racing driver, and BMW Motorsport works driver, currently competing in the IMSA SportsCar Championship for Paul Miller Racing.

Krohn is notable for winning the Finnish, Northern European Zone (NEZ) and Estonian Formula Renault championships. Krohn comes from a motorsport central family, with his father, Pertti, competing in the 1987 Finnish Formula Ford championship alongside 1998 and 1999 Formula One world champion Mika Häkkinen whilst his sister, Jenni, and brother, Oskari also compete in motorsport professionally in Finland.

== Personal and early life ==
Krohn was born in Nurmijärvi, located in the southern Uusimaa region of Finland, during September 1990. His father, Pertti Kurki-Suonio was a racing driver, who competed in the Finnish Formula Ford championship alongside future Formula One drivers Mika Häkkinen and Mika Salo. However, despite finishing behind Salo and Häkkinen in the championship, Pertti's career never went beyond Scandinavia, excluding a one-off appearance at Brands Hatch for the Formula Ford festival.

Krohn's elder sister, Jenni, and younger brother, Oskari, are also both racing drivers both currently racing in their native Finland.

== Racing career ==
Krohn began his career in karts when he was six, he spent nine years karting before moving up into car racing in 2005 as a test driver for saloon cars. In 2006, he competed in a number of Formula Ford events in his home country, finishing in eighth, and also competing in the Ford Ford Festival at Brands Hatch, finishing tenth, and also in the British Formula Ford Winter Series, finishing as runner up to Brit David Mayes. Krohn entered the full UK championship the following year as well as the Finnish Formula Three championship, "I was in a '97 Dallara with a H-pattern gearbox" Krohn recalls, "my shoulders were over the cockpit". In the UK championship, Krohn finished the year in 17th with 82 points whilst he had a better time in Finnish Formula Three with six wins and finishing second overall in the championship. He also re-entered the Formula Ford festival as well, performing better than the previous year finishing eighth.

2008 was Krohn's best year yet, with three championship wins in the Finnish, Northern European Zone (NEZ) and Estonian Formula Renault championships, recording ten wins in total. He also competed in the British, Italian and Northern European championships as well, but experiencing little success by comparison. With a number of successes the previous year, Krohn entered the UK Formula Renault championship for the whole season where he has so far tallied 117 points, including a win at Thruxton.

Krohn gained some notoriety during the year as well after climbing up from twenty–fifth to seventh in the wet conditions at Donington Park but soon dropped out of the point after his suspension failed and so had to complete the final three laps on three wheels, "exactly what Jan Magnussen would have done" commented Mark Burdett Motorsport engineer Andy Miller, who ran the Danish driver during his 1994 British Formula 3 campaign.

2014 saw Krohn admitted into the BMW Motorsport Junior Programme in which he trained in for three years, with established works drivers like Dirk Adorf and Jörg Müller. He won the 2017–18 Asian Le Mans Series GT Drivers title with Jun San Chen in the FIST-Team AAI BMW M6 GT3, and was promoted to BMW works driver in 2018.

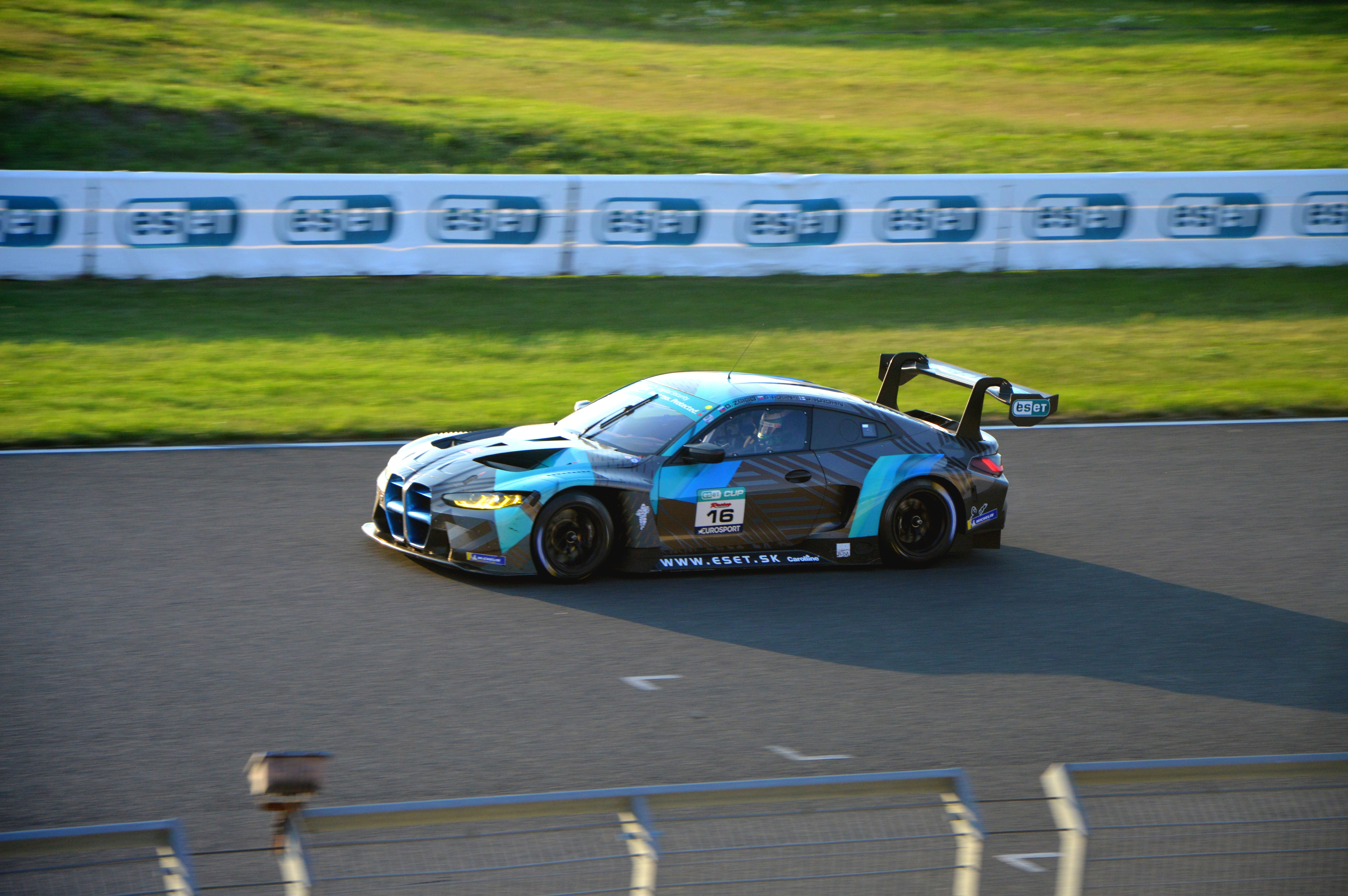
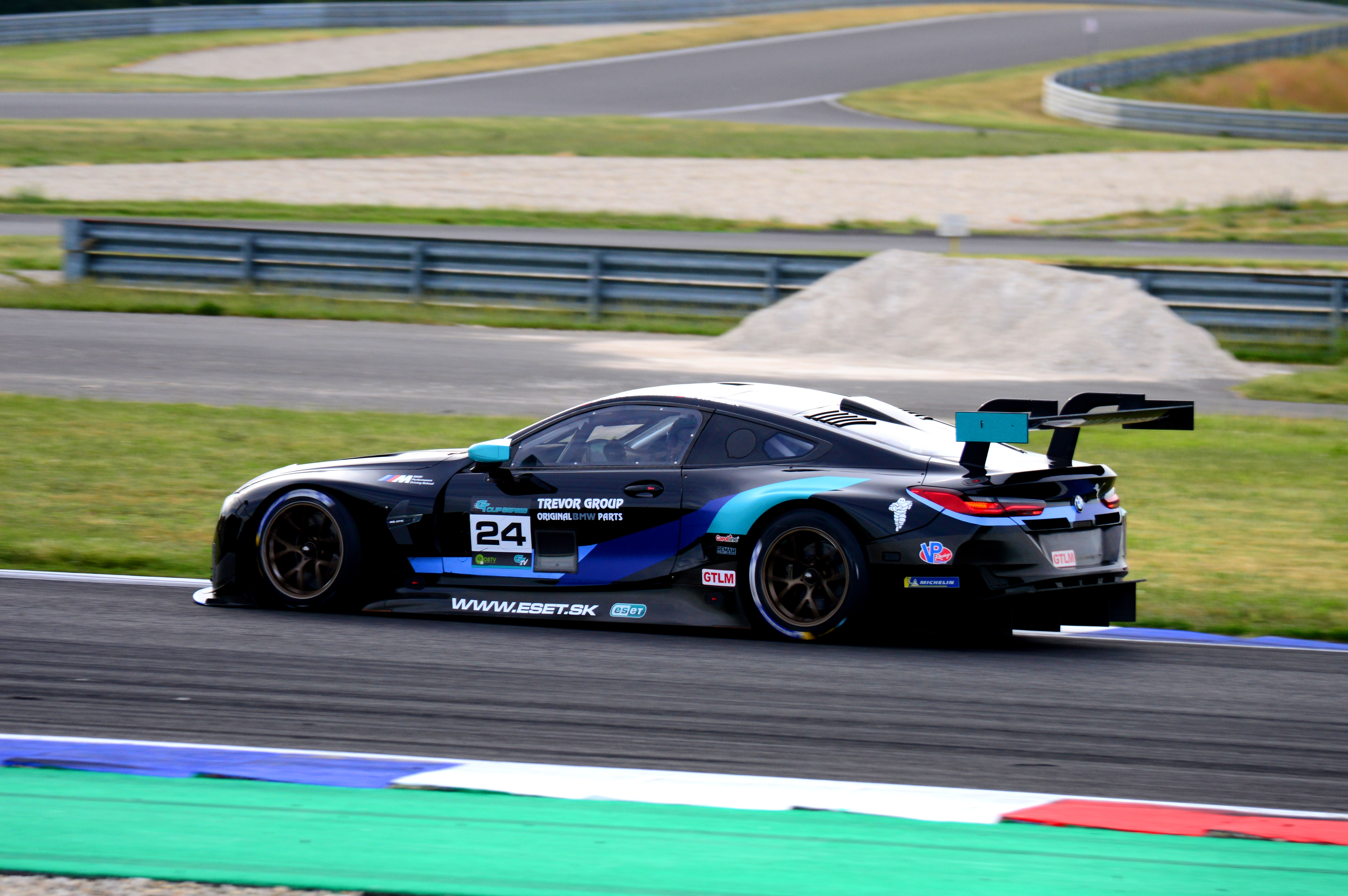
Krohn driving for Racing Trevor at the Slovakia Ring in FIA CEZ Endurance events. In 2023 (above), he competed in a BMW M4 GT3 and won in his class. In 2026 (below), he drove an M8 GTE, which he used to compete with as a factory driver in IMSA.

== Racing record ==
=== Career summary ===
Season	Series	Team	Races	Wins	Poles	F/Laps	Podiums	Points	Position
2008	Formula Renault 2.0 UK Championship	CR Scuderia	8	0	0	0	0	55	22nd
2008	Formula Renault 2.0 Italia	RP Motorsport	4	0	0	0	0	2	34th
2008	Formula Renault 2.0 NEC	P1 Motorsport	2	0	0	0	1	11	30th
2009	Formula Renault 2.0 UK Championship	Mark Burdett Motorsport	20	1	0	3	4	277	6th
2009	German Formula Three Championship	Stromos Art-Line	8	0	0	0	0	5	19th
2009	European F3 Open Championship	RP Motorsport	4	0	0	0	1	10	17th
2010	Italian Formula Three Championship	RP Motorsport	14	1	0	0	3	66	7th
2011	FIA GT3 European Championship	Fischer Racing	2	0	0	0	2	10	31st
2011	Italian Formula Three Championship	RP Motorsport	2	0	0	0	2	8	14th
2012	ADAC GT Masters	Lambda Performance	12	0	0	0	2	58	12th
2015	European Le Mans Series - LMGTE	BMW Sports Trophy Marc VDS	5	1	0	0	2	79	**2nd**
2015	ADAC GT Masters	BMW Sports Trophy Team Schubert	2	0	0	0	0	18	29th
2016	IMSA SportsCar Championship - GTD	Turner Motorsport	2	0	0	0	0	52	30th
2016	ADAC GT Masters	Schubert Motorsport	14	0	0	0	0	28	26th
2016	24 Hours of Nürburgring - SP9	Schubert Motorsport	1	0	0	0	0	N/A	NC
2016	Blancpain GT Series Sprint Cup	ROWE Racing	2	0	0	0	0	0	NC
2016-17	Asian Le Mans Series - GT	FIST-Team AAI	1	0	0	0	0	12	13th
2017	IMSA SportsCar Championship - GTD	Turner Motorsport	7	1	0	0	2	160	21st
2017	Blancpain GT Series Endurance Cup	ROWE Racing	1	0	0	0	0	0	NC
2017	Blancpain GT Series Sprint Cup	ROWE Racing	8	0	0	0	1	36	8th
2017	Blancpain GT Series Asia - GT3	FIST-Team AAI	4	0	0	0	1	15	25th
2017	24 Hours of Nürburgring - SP9	Schubert Motorsport	1	0	0	0	0	N/A	11th
2017-18	Asian Le Mans Series - GT	FIST-Team AAI	4	3	0	0	4	95	**1st**
2018	IMSA SportsCar Championship - GTLM	BMW M Team RLL	11	0	0	0	2	278	8th
2018	Blancpain GT Series Endurance Cup	ROWE Racing	5	0	0	0	0	13	33rd
2018	24 Hours of Nürburgring - SP9	ROWE Racing	1	0	0	0	0	N/A	DNF
2018-19	FIA World Endurance Championship - LMGTE Pro	BMW Team MTEK	1	0	0	0	0	12	23rd
2019	IMSA SportsCar Championship - GTLM	BMW M Team RLL	11	0	2	0	2	279	7th
2019	24 Hours of Nürburgring - SP9	ROWE Racing	1	0	0	0	0	N/A	DNF
2020	IMSA SportsCar Championship - GTLM	BMW M Team RLL	11	1	0	0	6	319	**2nd**
2020	ADAC GT Masters	Schubert Motorsport	2	0	0	0	0	9	36th
2021	IMSA SportsCar Championship - GTLM	BMW M Team RLL	4	0	1	0	4	1336	6th
2021	ADAC GT Masters	Schubert Motorsport	14	0	0	0	3	104	8th
2021	24 Hours of Nürburgring - SP9	Schubert Motorsport	1	0	0	0	0	N/A	6th
2021	GT World Challenge Europe Endurance Cup	BMW M Motorsport	1	0	0	0	0	0	NC
2022	IMSA SportsCar Championship - GTD Pro	BMW M Team RLL	2	0	0	0	1	609	15th
2022	ADAC GT Masters	Schubert Motorsport	14	0	1	0	1	91	16th
2022	24 Hours of Nürburgring - SP9	Schubert Motorsport	1	0	0	0	0	N/A	DNF
2022	International GT Open	Racing Team Trevor	2	0	0	0	2	20	16th
2023	GT World Challenge Asia	GH-Team AAI	2	0	0	1	0	12	32th
2023	GT World Challenge Asia	FIST-Team AAI	1	0	0	0	0	12	32th
2023	GT World Challenge Europe Endurance Cup	Team WRT	1	0	0	0	0	0	NC
2023	24 Hours of Nürburgring - SP9	Walkenhorst Motorsport	1	0	0	0	0	N/A	DNF
2024	IMSA SportsCar Championship - GTP	BMW M Team RLL	9	1	0	0	1	2537	7th
2024	24 Hours of Le Mans - Hypercar	BMW M Team WRT	Reserve driver						
2024	Thailand Super Series - GT3	Team AAI	8	2	?	?	6	136	**3rd**
2025	IMSA SportsCar Championship - GTD Pro	Paul Miller Racing	2	0	0	0	1	568	23rd
2025	GT World Challenge Europe Endurance Cup	ROWE Racing	5	1	0	0	2	60	4th
2025	Nürburgring Langstrecken-Serie - SP9	ROWE Racing							
2025	24 Hours of Nürburgring - SP9	ROWE Racing	1	1	0	0	1	N/A	**1st**
2025	Italian GT Championship Sprint Cup - GT3	BMW Italia Ceccato Racing	8	3	0	0	6	100	**2nd**
2025	China GT Championship - GT3	GAHA Racing	2	0	0	0	1	27	16th
2026	Nürburgring Langstrecken-Serie - SP9	KCMG							
2026	24 Hours of Nürburgring - SP9	KCMG	1	0	0	0	0	N/A	DNF
2026	GT World Challenge Asia	Team KRC	4	0	0	0	0	16	29th
2026	24H Series - GT3	Gamota Racing	1	0	0	0	0	24	32nd
2026	GT World Challenge America - Pro-Am	Riley Technologies	1	0	0	0	0	0	NC†

=== Complete Formula Renault 2.0 NEC results ===
(key) (Races in bold indicate pole position) (Races in italics indicate fastest lap)

Year	Entrant	1	2	3	4	5	6	7	8	9	10	11	12	13	14	15	16	DC	Points
2008	P1 Motorsport	HOC; 1	HOC; 2	ZAN; 1	ZAN; 2	ALA; 1; 10	ALA; 2 Ret	OSC; 1	OSC; 2	ASS; 1	ASS; 2	ZOL; 1	ZOL; 2	NÜR; 1	NÜR; 2	SPA; 1	SPA; 2	30th	11

=== Complete ADAC GT Masters results ===
(key) (Races in bold indicate pole position) (Races in italics indicate fastest lap)

Year	Team	Car	1	2	3	4	5	6	7	8	9	10	11	12	13	14	15	16	Pos.	Points
2012	Lambda Performance	Ford GT GT3	OSC; 1; 4	OSC; 2 Ret	ZAN; 1; 4	ZAN; 2 Ret	SAC; 1; 2	SAC; 2 Ret	NÜR; 1 Ret	NÜR; 2; 10	RBR; 1; 8	RBR; 2; 3	LAU; 1; 11	LAU; 2 Ret	NÜR; 1	NÜR; 2	HOC; 1	HOC; 2	12th	58
2015	BMW Sports Trophy Team Schubert	BMW Z4 GT3	OSC; 1; 6	OSC; 2; 5	RBR; 1	RBR; 2	SPA; 1	SPA; 2	LAU; 1	LAU; 2	NÜR; 1	NÜR; 2	SAC; 1	SAC; 2	ZAN; 1	ZAN; 2	HOC; 1	HOC; 2	29th	18
2016	Schubert Motorsport	BMW M6 GT3	OSC; 1; 5	OSC; 2; 8	SAC; 1; 21	SAC; 2; 29	LAU; 1; 28	LAU; 2; 6	RBR; 1; 20	RBR; 2 Ret	NÜR; 1; 23	NÜR; 2; 12	ZAN; 1; 9	ZAN; 2; 8	HOC; 1; 12	HOC; 2; 15			26th	28
2020	Schubert Motorsport	BMW M6 GT3	LAU; 1	LAU; 2	NÜR; 1	NÜR; 2	HOC; 1	HOC; 2	SAC; 1; 20	SAC; 2; 7	RBR; 1	RBR; 2	LAU; 1	LAU; 2	OSC; 1	OSC; 2			36th	9
2021	Schubert Motorsport	BMW M6 GT3	OSC; 1; 4	OSC; 2; 2	RBR; 1 Ret	RBR; 2; 3	ZAN; 1; 3	ZAN; 2 Ret	LAU; 1; 7	LAU; 2; 11	SAC; 1; 10	SAC; 2 DSQ	HOC; 1; 22	HOC; 2 Ret	NÜR; 1; 9	NÜR; 2; 8			8th	104
2022	Schubert Motorsport	BMW M4 GT3	OSC; 1; 7	OSC; 2; 4	RBR; 1; 5	RBR; 2; 2^{2}	ZAN; 1; 19†	ZAN; 2 Ret	NÜR; 1 Ret	NÜR; 2; 9	LAU; 1; 12	**LAU**; **2** Ret^{1}	SAC; 1; 13	SAC; 2; 8	HOC; 1 Ret	HOC; 2; 6			16th	91

=== Complete European Le Mans Series results ===
(key) (Races in bold indicate pole position; races in italics indicate fastest lap)

Year	Team	Make	Engine	Class	1	2	3	4	5	Rank	Points
2015	BMW Sports Trophy Marc VDS	BMW Z4 GTE	BMW 4.4 L V8	LMGTE	SIL; 4	IMO; 4	RBR; 4	LEC; 2	EST; 1	2nd	79

=== Complete IMSA SportsCar Championship results ===
(key) (Races in bold indicate pole position; races in italics indicate fastest lap)

Year	Team	Make	Engine	Class	1	2	3	4	5	6	7	8	9	10	11	12	Rank	Points	Ref
2016	Turner Motorsport	GTD	BMW M6 GT3	BMW S63 4.4 L Twin-turbo V8	DAY; 5	SEB; 7	LGA	BEL	WGL	MOS	LIM	ELK	VIR	AUS	PET		30th	52	
2017	Turner Motorsport	GTD	BMW M6 GT3	BMW S63 4.4 L Twin-turbo V8	DAY; 8	SEB; 20	LBH	AUS	DET	WGL	MOS	LIM; 14	ELK; 1	VIR; 2	LGA; 5	PET; 15	21st	160	
2018	BMW Team RLL	GTLM	BMW M8 GTE	BMW P63 4.0 L Twin-turbo V8	DAY; 7	SEB; 7	LBH; 5	**MDO**; 7	WGL; 8	MOS; 8	LIM; 8	ELK; 8	VIR; 3	LGA; 4	PET; 3		8th	278	
2019	BMW Team RLL	GTLM	BMW M8 GTE	BMW P63 4.0 L Twin-turbo V8	DAY; 9	SEB; 4	LBH; 8	MDO; 6	WGL; 5	**MOS**; 2	LIM; 8	ELK; 8	VIR; 8	**LGA**; 2	PET; 9		7th	279	
2020	BMW Team RLL	GTLM	BMW M8 GTE	BMW P63 4.0 L Twin-turbo V8	DAY; 1	DAY; 6	SEB; 5	ELK; 3	VIR; 6	ATL; 3	MDO; 4	CLT; 2	PET; 3	LGA; 4	SEB; 3		2nd	319	
2021	BMW Team RLL	GTLM	BMW M8 GTE	BMW P63 4.0 L Twin-turbo V8	DAY; 3	SEB; 3	DET	WGL; 2	WGL	LIM	ELK	LGA	LBH	VIR	**PET**; 3		6th	1336	
2022	BMW M Team RLL	GTD Pro	BMW M4 GT3	BMW P58 3.0 L Twin-turbo I6	DAY; 7	SEB	LBH	LGA	WGL	MOS	LIM	ELK	VIR	PET; 2			15th	609	
2024	BMW M Team RLL	GTP	BMW M Hybrid V8	BMW P66/3 4.0 L Turbo V8	DAY; 8	SEB; 6	LBH; 6	LGA; 9	DET; 7	WGL; 5	ELK; 7	IMS; 1	PET; 5				7th	2537	
2025	Paul Miller Racing	GTD Pro	BMW M4 GT3 Evo	BMW P58 3.0 L Twin-turbo I6	DAY; 12	SEB; 2	LGA	DET	WGL	MOS	ELK	VIR	IMS	PET			23rd	568	

^{*} Season still in progress.

=== Complete 24 Hours of Nürburgring results ===
Year	Team	Co-Drivers	Car	Class	Laps	Pos.	Class Pos.
2016	(Germany) Schubert Motorsport	(Brazil) Augusto Farfus (Germany) Jörg Müller (Germany) Marco Wittmann	BMW M6 GT3	SP9	60	NC	NC
2017	(Germany) Schubert Motorsport	(Germany) Jörg Müller (Canada) Bruno Spengler (Canada) Kuno Wittmer	BMW M6 GT3	SP9	157	11th	11th
2018	(Germany) Rowe Racing	(United States) Connor De Phillippi (United Kingdom) Alexander Sims (Germany) Martin Tomczyk	BMW M6 GT3	SP9	16	DNF	DNF
2019	(Germany) Rowe Racing	(Netherlands) Nicky Catsburg (United States) John Edwards (Germany) Marco Wittmann	BMW M6 GT3	SP9	8	DNF	DNF
2021	(Germany) Schubert Motorsport	(Netherlands) Stef Dusseldorp (Germany) Jens Klingmann (United Kingdom) Alexander Sims	BMW M6 GT3	SP9	59	6th	6th
2022	(Germany) Schubert Motorsport	(Germany) Jens Klingmann (Germany) Niklas Krütten (United Kingdom) Alexander Sims	BMW M4 GT3	SP9	153	DNF	DNF
2023	(Germany) Walkenhorst Motorsport	(Poland) Kuba Giermaziak (Norway) Christian Krognes (Spain) Andy Soucek	BMW M4 GT3	SP9	39	DNF	DNF
2025	(Germany) Rowe Racing	(Brazil) Augusto Farfus (South Africa) Kelvin van der Linde (Switzerland) Raffaele Marciello	BMW M4 GT3 Evo	SP9	141	**1st**	**1st**
2026	(Hong Kong) KCMG	(Japan) Nirei Fukuzumi (Japan) Naoya Gamou (United Kingdom) David Pittard	Mercedes-AMG GT3 Evo	SP9	15	DNF	DNF

=== Complete GT World Challenge Europe results ===
(key) (Races in bold indicate pole position; races in italics indicate fastest lap)

==== GT World Challenge Europe Sprint Cup ====
Year	Team	Car	Class	1	2	3	4	5	6	7	8	9	10	Pos.	Points
2016	Rowe Racing	BMW M6 GT3	Pro	MIS; QR	MIS; CR	BRH; QR; 22	BRH; CR; Ret	NÜR; QR	NÜR; CR	HUN; QR	HUN; CR	CAT; QR	CAT; CR	NC	0
2017	Rowe Racing	BMW M6 GT3	Pro	MIS; QR; 11	MIS; CR; 7	BRH; QR; 2	BRH; CR; 4	ZOL; QR; 26	ZOL; CR; 12	HUN; QR	HUN; CR	NÜR; QR; 10	NÜR; CR; 4	8th	36

==== GT World Challenge Europe Endurance Cup ====
Year	Team	Car	Class	1	2	3	4	5	6	7	Pos.	Points
2017	Rowe Racing	BMW M6 GT3	Pro	MNZ	SIL; 41	LEC	SPA; 6H	SPA; 12H	SPA; 24H	CAT	27th	6
2018	Rowe Racing	BMW M6 GT3	Pro	MNZ; Ret	SIL; 13	LEC; Ret	SPA; 6H; 2	SPA; 12H; 55	SPA; 24H; Ret	CAT; 8	33rd	13
2021	BMW M Motorsport	BMW M4 GT3	INV	MNZ	LEC	SPA; 6H	SPA; 12H	SPA; 24H	NUR	CAT; 16	NC	0
2023	Team WRT	BMW M4 GT3	Bronze	MNZ	LEC	SPA; 6H	SPA; 12H	SPA; 24H	NÜR	CAT; 28	30th	6
2025	Rowe Racing	BMW M4 GT3 Evo	Pro	LEC; 7	MNZ; Ret	SPA; 6H; 8	SPA; 12H; 8	SPA; 24H; 5	NÜR; 1	CAT; 3	4th	60

=== Complete Asian Le Mans Series results ===
(key) (Races in bold indicate pole position; races in italics indicate fastest lap)

Year	Team	Make	Engine	Class	1	2	3	4	Rank	Points
2016-17	FIST-Team AAI	BMW M6 GT3	BMW 4.4 L V8	GT	ZHU	FUJ	BUR; 4	SEP	13th	12
2017-18	FIST-Team AAI	BMW M6 GT3	BMW 4.4 L V8	GT	ZHU; 1	**FUJ**; 1	BUR; 1	**SEP**; 1	1st	95

=== Complete FIA World Endurance Championship results ===
(key) (Races in bold indicate pole position; races in italics indicate fastest lap)

Year	Entrant	Class	Chassis	Engine	1	2	3	4	5	6	7	8	Rank	Points
2018–19	BMW Team MTEK	LMGTE Pro	BMW M8 GTE	BMW P63 4.0 L Turbo V8	SPA	LMS	SIL	FUJ	SHA	SEB	SPA	LMS; 6	23rd	12

=== Complete 24 Hours of Le Mans results ===
Year	Team	Co-Drivers	Car	Class	Laps	Pos.	Class Pos.
2019	(Germany) BMW Team MTEK	(Portugal) António Félix da Costa (Brazil) Augusto Farfus	BMW M8 GTE	GTE; Pro	335	30th	10th

Sporting positions
Preceded by Ryan Briscoe; Richard Westbrook	Michelin Endurance Cup; GTLM Champion; 2020; With: John Edwards	Succeeded by Nick Tandy; Tommy Milner
