= 2025 TCR Asia Series =

Racing event series

The 2025 TCR Asia Series season was the ninth season of the TCR Asia Series.

== Calendar ==
The provisional 2025 schedule was announced on 17 December 2024, with six events scheduled. The season began at Shanghai International Circuit on 25 April and finished at Hunan International Circuit on 2 November. The first round was part of the TCR China Touring Car Championship and the final round was part of the TCR World Tour.

On 23 June, the TCR Asia Secretariat published a revised calendar. The rounds in Thailand were cancelled. Round 3 was moved to Sepang, followed by two rounds at Inje Speedium. The final round was held together with the 2025 TCR China Challenge in Zhuzhou, plus a non-championship invitational round at the Macau Grand Prix.

A further update was published on 8 July 2025. The non-championship invitational round at the Macau Grand Prix was cancelled. The season finale took place in Zhuzhou alongside the 2025 TCR World Tour, instead of the TCR China Challenge as previously planned.

Part of the Khumo FIA TCR World Tour
Part of the TCR China Challenge

Round(s)	Circuit	Date	Supporting series
1–2	(China) Shanghai International Circuit, Jiading, Shanghai	25–27 April	TCR China Championship; China GT Championship; CTCC China Cup
3–4	(China) Ningbo International Circuit, Ningbo	9–11 May	TCR China Championship; CTCC China Cup
5–6	(Malaysia) Sepang International Circuit, Selangor	25–27 July	Malaysia Championship Series
7–8	(South Korea) Inje Speedium, Inje	12–14 September	Hyundai N Festival
9–11	(South Korea) Inje Speedium, Inje	17–19 October	Hyundai Avante N Cup; Hyundai N Festival
12–13	(China) Hunan International Circuit, Zhuzhou	1–2 November	TCR China Challenge; TCR China Championship; CTCC China Cup; X-racing ETCR

== Teams and drivers ==
Team	Car	No.	Drivers	Rounds
(China) Spark Racing	Honda Civic Type R TCR (FL5)	85	(China) Sun Ju Ran	1
(Hong Kong) Team TRC	Honda Civic Type R TCR (FL5)	237	(Hong Kong) Euan Chan Ho Ting	1
(Hong Kong) Team TRC	Honda Civic Type R TCR (FL5)	19	(Hong Kong) William Cheung Wang Chi	1
(Hong Kong) Team TRC	Honda Civic Type R TCR (FL5)	22	(Hong Kong) Terence Tse	1
(Hong Kong) Team TRC	Honda Civic Type R TCR (FL5)	23	(Macau) Tommy Ku Siu Lam	1
(Hong Kong) Team TRC	Honda Civic Type R TCR (FL5)	7	(Hong Kong) Michael Choi	1
(China) 326 Racing Team	Audi RS 3 LMS TCR (2021)	11	(China) Liu Zi Chen	1
(China) 326 Racing Team	Audi RS 3 LMS TCR (2021)	2	(China) Zhao Di	1
(China) RevX Racing	Audi RS 3 LMS TCR (2021)	88	(China) Zhang Lian Shang	1
(China) RevX Racing	Audi RS 3 LMS TCR (2021)	521	(China) Zhao Di	1
(China) Delta Racing Team	Audi RS 3 LMS TCR (2021)	72	(China) Zhou Hao Wen	1
(China) Delta Racing Team	Audi RS 3 LMS TCR (2021)	99	(China) Liu Chao	1
(China) DRT	Audi RS 3 LMS TCR (2021)	72	(China) Zhou Hao Wen	1
(China) Z.Speed Motorsport	Hyundai Elantra N TCR	86	(China) Jiang Nan	1
(China) Z.Speed Motorsport	Hyundai Elantra N TCR	61	(China) Tang Zi Hao	1
(China) Z.Speed Motorsport	Hyundai Elantra N TCR	27	(China) Zhang Ming Yang	1
(China) Z.Speed Motorsport	Hyundai Elantra N TCR	97	(China) Yang Hao Jie	1
(China) Z.Speed Motorsport	Hyundai Elantra N TCR	56	(Indonesia) Benny Santoso	1
(Philippines) Eurasia Motorsport	Hyundai Elantra N TCR	69	(Chinese Taipei) Andy Liang Wenyao	1
(Philippines) Eurasia Motorsport	Hyundai Elantra N TCR	81	(Philippines) Reignbert 'Red' Diwa	1

== Results ==
All final results can be found here. Rounds 1 & 2 were held together with TCR China Challenge. Rounds 5 to 7 were held together with the TCR World Tour.

Rnd.		Circuit	Pole position	Fastest Lap	Winning driver
1	1	(China) Shanghai International Circuit	(Chinese Taipei) Sean Chang	(Chinese Taipei) Sean Chang	(Chinese Taipei) Sean Chang
1	2	(China) Shanghai International Circuit		(China) Liu Zi Chen	(China) Liu Zi Chen
2	3	(China) Ningbo International Speedpark	(Chinese Taipei) Sean Chang	(Chinese Taipei) Sean Chang	(Chinese Taipei) Sean Chang
2	4	(China) Ningbo International Speedpark		(China) Liu Zi Chen	(China) Liu Zi Chen
3	5	(Malaysia) Petronas Sepang International Circuit	(Ecuador) Diego Moran	(Ecuador) Diego Moran	(Ecuador) Diego Moran
3	6	(Malaysia) Petronas Sepang International Circuit		(Ecuador) Diego Moran	(Ecuador) Diego Moran
4	7	(South Korea) Inje Speedium International Circuit	(South Korea) Junui Park	(South Korea) Junui Park	(South Korea) Junui Park
4	8	(South Korea) Inje Speedium International Circuit		(Ecuador) Diego Moran	(Chinese Taipei) Sean Chang
5	9	(South Korea) Inje Speedium International Circuit	(Sweden) Thed Björk	(Sweden) Thed Björk (Note: Thed Björk and Esteban Guerrieri set identical fastest lap times. As Björk set his first, he was credited with the fastest lap.)	(Australia) Josh Buchan
5	10	(South Korea) Inje Speedium International Circuit		(Spain) Mikel Azcona	(Spain) Mikel Azcona
5	11	(South Korea) Inje Speedium International Circuit		(Sweden) Thed Björk	(Sweden) Thed Björk
6	12	(China) Hunan International Circuit	(France) Aurélien Comte	(Sweden) Thed Björk	(France) Aurélien Comte
6	13	(China) Hunan International Circuit		(Uruguay) Santiago Urrutia	(France) Yann Ehrlacher
6	14	(China) Hunan International Circuit		(France) Aurélien Comte	(France) Aurélien Comte
