= 2025 China GT Championship =

Motor racing competition season

The 2025 China GT Championship was the first season of the China GT Championship under the organisation and promotion by Top Speed Sport Events LS Limited. The season began on 25 April at Shanghai International Circuit, and ended on 21 September at Shanghai International Circuit.

== Calendar ==
The provisional race calendar was published on 23 April 2025. It included a warm-up round at Ningbo and four championship rounds at Shanghai and the V1 Tianjin International Circuit, as well as a non-championship event in early October with the 8 Hours of Shanghai. In a revised calendar, the round at the Tianjin International Circuit was replaced by the Zhuhai International Circuit. The remaining three championship rounds were all scheduled at the Shanghai International Circuit, while the 8 Hours of Shanghai event was removed from the calendar entirely.

Round	Circuit	Date	Supporting	Map
1	Shanghai International Circuit, Jiading, Shanghai, Shanghai	26–27 April	TCR Asia Series; TCR China Championship; TCR China Challenge; CTCC China Cup; Lynk & Co Auto Challenge	2025 China GT Championship is located in China
2	Shanghai International Circuit, Jiading, Shanghai, Shanghai	17–18 May	FIA F4 Chinese Championship; Lamborghini Super Trofeo Asia; Toyota Gazoo Racing China GR86 Cup	2025 China GT Championship is located in China
3	Zhuhai International Circuit, Zhuhai, Guangdong	21–22 June	Hyundai N Cup	2025 China GT Championship is located in China
4	Shanghai International Circuit, Jiading, Shanghai, Shanghai	20–21 September	TCR China Championship; TCR China Challenge; CTCC China Cup; Lynk & Co Auto Challenge	2025 China GT Championship is located in China

== Entries ==
Entrant/Team	Chassis	Engine	No.	Drivers	Class	Rounds
GT3
(China) GAHA Racing	BMW M4 GT3 Evo	BMW P58 3.0 L turbocharged I6	6	(China) Bian Ye	Am	3
(China) GAHA Racing	BMW M4 GT3 Evo	BMW P58 3.0 L turbocharged I6	6	(China) Ye Sichao	Am	3
(China) GAHA Racing	BMW M4 GT3 Evo	BMW P58 3.0 L turbocharged I6	789	(China) Ye Sichao	PA	4
(China) GAHA Racing	BMW M4 GT3 Evo	BMW P58 3.0 L turbocharged I6	789	(Finland) Jesse Krohn	PA	4
(China) ParkingPark Racing by Z.Speed	BMW M4 GT3 Evo	BMW P58 3.0 L turbocharged I6	18	(China) Zhang Mingyang	PA	4
(China) ParkingPark Racing by Z.Speed	BMW M4 GT3 Evo	BMW P58 3.0 L turbocharged I6	18	(China) Zhang Zhendong	PA	4
(China) Origine Motorsport	Porsche 911 GT3 R (992)	Porsche M97/80 4.2 L H6	22	(China) Liu Hangcheng	PA	4
(China) Origine Motorsport	Porsche 911 GT3 R (992)	Porsche M97/80 4.2 L H6	22	(China) Luo Kailuo	PA	4
(China) Origine Motorsport	Mercedes-AMG GT3 Evo	Mercedes-AMG M159 6.2 L V8	55	(China) Lu Wei	PA	All
(China) Origine Motorsport	Mercedes-AMG GT3 Evo	Mercedes-AMG M159 6.2 L V8	55	(China) Xie Xinzhe	PA	All
(China) Origine Motorsport	Mercedes-AMG GT3 Evo	Mercedes-AMG M159 6.2 L V8	88	(China) Jiang Jiawei	Am	4
(China) Origine Motorsport	Mercedes-AMG GT3 Evo	Mercedes-AMG M159 6.2 L V8	88	(China) Tang Ruobin	Am	4
(China) Origine Motorsport	Audi R8 LMS Evo II	Audi DAR 5.2 L V10	77	(China) Jason Gu	Am	All
(China) Origine Motorsport	Audi R8 LMS Evo II	Audi DAR 5.2 L V10	77	(China) Min Heng	Am	All
(China) Level Motorsports	Audi R8 LMS Evo II	Audi DAR 5.2 L V10	26	(China) Chang Chienshang	PA	2
(China) Level Motorsports	Audi R8 LMS Evo II	Audi DAR 5.2 L V10	26	(Chinese Taipei) Chuang Chi-Shun	PA	2
(China) Level Motorsports	Mercedes-AMG GT3	Mercedes-AMG M159 6.2 L V8	88	(China) Jiang Jiawei	PA	1–2
(China) Level Motorsports	Mercedes-AMG GT3	Mercedes-AMG M159 6.2 L V8	88	(China) Yang Shuo	PA	1–2
(China) 610 Racing	Audi R8 LMS Evo II	Audi DAR 5.2 L V10	33	(Hong Kong) Liu Kaishun	P	1
(China) 610 Racing	Audi R8 LMS Evo II	Audi DAR 5.2 L V10	33	(China) Yu Kuai	P	1
(China) 610 Racing	Audi R8 LMS Evo II	Audi DAR 5.2 L V10	33	(China) Yang Baijie	PA	2–4
(China) 610 Racing	Audi R8 LMS Evo II	Audi DAR 5.2 L V10	33	(China) Lu Wenlong	PA	2
(China) 610 Racing	Audi R8 LMS Evo II	Audi DAR 5.2 L V10	33	(China) Li Zhicong	PA	3–4
(China) 610 Racing	Audi R8 LMS Evo II	Audi DAR 5.2 L V10	62	(China) Bao Tian	Am	3
(China) 610 Racing	Audi R8 LMS Evo II	Audi DAR 5.2 L V10	915	(China) Pan Deng	Am	All
(China) 610 Racing	Audi R8 LMS Evo II	Audi DAR 5.2 L V10	915	(China) Yang Xiaowei	Am	All
(China) 610 Racing	Porsche 911 GT3 R (992)	Porsche M97/80 4.2 L H6	610	(China) Zach Xu	PA	1, 3
(China) 610 Racing	Porsche 911 GT3 R (992)	Porsche M97/80 4.2 L H6	610	(China) Cui Yue	PA	1
(China) 610 Racing	Porsche 911 GT3 R (992)	Porsche M97/80 4.2 L H6	610	(China) Lu Wenlong	PA	3
(China) 610 Racing	Porsche 911 GT3 R (992)	Porsche M97/80 4.2 L H6	610	(China) Dennis Zhang	Am	4
(China) / Winhere Harmony Racing (Note: Car No. 37 entered as Winhere Harmony Racing, No. 50 entered as 33R Harmony Racing for round 2 and Harmony Racing for round 3, Car No. 66 entered as 33R Harmony Racing, Car No. 666 entered as HEHEHE Racing by 33R HAR, Car No. 72 entered as 33R HAR); (China) / Harmony Racing; (China) / 33R Harmony Racing; (China) / HEHEHE Racing by 33R HAR; (China) / 33R HAR	Audi R8 LMS Evo II	Audi DAR 5.2 L V10	37	(China) David Chen	PA	1
(China) / Winhere Harmony Racing; (China) / Harmony Racing; (China) / 33R Harmony Racing; (China) / HEHEHE Racing by 33R HAR; (China) / 33R HAR	Audi R8 LMS Evo II	Audi DAR 5.2 L V10	37	(China) Liu Hangcheng	PA	1
(China) / Winhere Harmony Racing; (China) / Harmony Racing; (China) / 33R Harmony Racing; (China) / HEHEHE Racing by 33R HAR; (China) / 33R HAR	Audi R8 LMS Evo II	Audi DAR 5.2 L V10	37	(China) Deng Yi	P	2, 4
(China) / Winhere Harmony Racing; (China) / Harmony Racing; (China) / 33R Harmony Racing; (China) / HEHEHE Racing by 33R HAR; (China) / 33R HAR	Audi R8 LMS Evo II	Audi DAR 5.2 L V10	37	(China) Luo Kailuo	P	2
(China) / Winhere Harmony Racing; (China) / Harmony Racing; (China) / 33R Harmony Racing; (China) / HEHEHE Racing by 33R HAR; (China) / 33R HAR	Audi R8 LMS Evo II	Audi DAR 5.2 L V10	50	(Hong Kong) Liu Kaishun	PA	3
(China) / Winhere Harmony Racing; (China) / Harmony Racing; (China) / 33R Harmony Racing; (China) / HEHEHE Racing by 33R HAR; (China) / 33R HAR	Audi R8 LMS Evo II	Audi DAR 5.2 L V10	50	(China) Dennis Zhang	PA	3
(China) / Winhere Harmony Racing; (China) / Harmony Racing; (China) / 33R Harmony Racing; (China) / HEHEHE Racing by 33R HAR; (China) / 33R HAR	Audi R8 LMS Evo II	Audi DAR 5.2 L V10	66	(China) Dennis Zhang	Am	1
(China) / Winhere Harmony Racing; (China) / Harmony Racing; (China) / 33R Harmony Racing; (China) / HEHEHE Racing by 33R HAR; (China) / 33R HAR	Audi R8 LMS Evo II	Audi DAR 5.2 L V10	66	(Macau) Lu Zhiwei	Am	1
(China) / Winhere Harmony Racing; (China) / Harmony Racing; (China) / 33R Harmony Racing; (China) / HEHEHE Racing by 33R HAR; (China) / 33R HAR	Audi R8 LMS Evo II	Audi DAR 5.2 L V10	66	(China) Jiang Nan	Am	2–4
(China) / Winhere Harmony Racing; (China) / Harmony Racing; (China) / 33R Harmony Racing; (China) / HEHEHE Racing by 33R HAR; (China) / 33R HAR	Audi R8 LMS Evo II	Audi DAR 5.2 L V10	66	(China) Yang Haojie	Am	2–4
(China) / Winhere Harmony Racing; (China) / Harmony Racing; (China) / 33R Harmony Racing; (China) / HEHEHE Racing by 33R HAR; (China) / 33R HAR	Audi R8 LMS Evo II	Audi DAR 5.2 L V10	666	(China) Steven Zhou	Am	1–2, 4
(China) / Winhere Harmony Racing; (China) / Harmony Racing; (China) / 33R Harmony Racing; (China) / HEHEHE Racing by 33R HAR; (China) / 33R HAR	Audi R8 LMS Evo II	Audi DAR 5.2 L V10	666	(China) Wang Zhongwei	Am	1
(China) / Winhere Harmony Racing; (China) / Harmony Racing; (China) / 33R Harmony Racing; (China) / HEHEHE Racing by 33R HAR; (China) / 33R HAR	Audi R8 LMS Evo II	Audi DAR 5.2 L V10	666	(Singapore) Zhen Mingwei	Am	2
(China) / Winhere Harmony Racing; (China) / Harmony Racing; (China) / 33R Harmony Racing; (China) / HEHEHE Racing by 33R HAR; (China) / 33R HAR	Audi R8 LMS Evo II	Audi DAR 5.2 L V10	666	(China) Liu Hangcheng	Am	3
(China) / Winhere Harmony Racing; (China) / Harmony Racing; (China) / 33R Harmony Racing; (China) / HEHEHE Racing by 33R HAR; (China) / 33R HAR	Audi R8 LMS Evo II	Audi DAR 5.2 L V10	666	(Macau) Lu Zhiwei	Am	3
(China) / Winhere Harmony Racing; (China) / Harmony Racing; (China) / 33R Harmony Racing; (China) / HEHEHE Racing by 33R HAR; (China) / 33R HAR	Audi R8 LMS Evo II	Audi DAR 5.2 L V10	666	(China) Wang Yang	Am	4
(China) / Winhere Harmony Racing; (China) / Harmony Racing; (China) / 33R Harmony Racing; (China) / HEHEHE Racing by 33R HAR; (China) / 33R HAR	Ferrari 296 GT3	Ferrari F163CE 3.0 L turbocharged V6	50	(China) Hu Haoheng	Am	2
(China) / Winhere Harmony Racing; (China) / Harmony Racing; (China) / 33R Harmony Racing; (China) / HEHEHE Racing by 33R HAR; (China) / 33R HAR	Ferrari 296 GT3	Ferrari F163CE 3.0 L turbocharged V6	50	(China) Liu Hangcheng	Am	2
(China) / Winhere Harmony Racing; (China) / Harmony Racing; (China) / 33R Harmony Racing; (China) / HEHEHE Racing by 33R HAR; (China) / 33R HAR	Ferrari 296 GT3	Ferrari F163CE 3.0 L turbocharged V6	72	(China) Wang Yang	Am	1
(China) / Winhere Harmony Racing; (China) / Harmony Racing; (China) / 33R Harmony Racing; (China) / HEHEHE Racing by 33R HAR; (China) / 33R HAR	Ferrari 296 GT3	Ferrari F163CE 3.0 L turbocharged V6	72	(Singapore) Zhen Mingwei	Am	1
(China) Incipient Racing	Audi R8 LMS Evo II	Audi DAR 5.2 L V10	51	(China) Xiao Min	M	1, 4
(China) Incipient Racing	Audi R8 LMS Evo II	Audi DAR 5.2 L V10	51	(China) Air Tong	M	4
(China) Incipient Racing	Audi R8 LMS Evo II	Audi DAR 5.2 L V10	68	(China) Ray Wu	M	1
(China) Incipient Racing	Audi R8 LMS Evo II	Audi DAR 5.2 L V10	68	(China) Xing Yanbin	M	1
(China) UNO Racing Team	Audi R8 LMS Evo II	Audi DAR 5.2 L V10	85	(China) David Pun	Am	1, 4
(China) UNO Racing Team	Audi R8 LMS Evo II	Audi DAR 5.2 L V10	85	(China) Wang Yibo	Am	1, 4
(China) UNO Racing Team	Audi R8 LMS Evo II	Audi DAR 5.2 L V10	98	(Hong Kong) "Rio"	PA	1–2
(China) UNO Racing Team	Audi R8 LMS Evo II	Audi DAR 5.2 L V10	98	(China) Chen Yechong	PA	1–2
(China) UNO Racing Team	Audi R8 LMS Evo II	Audi DAR 5.2 L V10	98	(China) Chen Yechong	Am	3–4
(China) UNO Racing Team	Audi R8 LMS Evo II	Audi DAR 5.2 L V10	98	(China) Song Yiran	Am	3–4
(Chinese Taipei) FIST Team AAI	BMW M4 GT3 Evo	BMW P58 3.0 L turbocharged I6	90	(Sweden) Erik Johansson	PA	All
(Chinese Taipei) FIST Team AAI	BMW M4 GT3 Evo	BMW P58 3.0 L turbocharged I6	90	(China) Lin Yu	PA	1, 3–4
(Chinese Taipei) FIST Team AAI	BMW M4 GT3 Evo	BMW P58 3.0 L turbocharged I6	90	(China) Huang Ruohan	PA	2
(Chinese Taipei) FIST Team AAI	BMW M4 GT3 (1–2); BMW M4 GT3 Evo (3–4)	BMW P58 3.0 L turbocharged I6	91PA	(Chinese Taipei) Chen Yin-yu	PA	All
(Chinese Taipei) FIST Team AAI	BMW M4 GT3 (1–2); BMW M4 GT3 Evo (3–4)	BMW P58 3.0 L turbocharged I6	91PA	(Belgium) Ugo de Wilde	PA	1–2, 4
(Chinese Taipei) FIST Team AAI	BMW M4 GT3 (1–2); BMW M4 GT3 Evo (3–4)	BMW P58 3.0 L turbocharged I6	91PA	(Finland) William Alatalo	PA	3
(China) Youpeng Racing	Mercedes-AMG GT3 Evo	Mercedes-AMG M159 6.2 L V8	91M	(China) Cao Qikuan	M	1–3
(China) Youpeng Racing	Mercedes-AMG GT3 Evo	Mercedes-AMG M159 6.2 L V8	91M	(China) Shen Jian	M	1–3
(China) / Team DIXCEL Harmony Racing (1); (China) / Team DIXCEL / GAHA with KRC (2–3); (China) / Team DIXCEL by GAHA Racing (4)	Lamborghini Huracan GT3 Evo (1–3); BMW M4 GT3 Evo (4)	Lamborghini DGF 5.2 L V10 (1–3); BMW P58 3.0 L turbocharged I6 (4)	328	(China) Li Hanyu	Am	All
(China) / Team DIXCEL Harmony Racing (1); (China) / Team DIXCEL / GAHA with KRC (2–3); (China) / Team DIXCEL by GAHA Racing (4)	Lamborghini Huracan GT3 Evo (1–3); BMW M4 GT3 Evo (4)	Lamborghini DGF 5.2 L V10 (1–3); BMW P58 3.0 L turbocharged I6 (4)	328	(China) Ou Ziyang	Am	All
(China) Climax Racing	Ferrari 296 GT3	Ferrari F163CE 3.0 L turbocharged V6	710	(China) Chen Fangping	PA	All
(China) Climax Racing	Ferrari 296 GT3	Ferrari F163CE 3.0 L turbocharged V6	710	(Finland) Elias Seppänen	PA	All
(China) Climax Racing	Mercedes-AMG GT3 Evo	Mercedes-AMG M159 6.2 L V8	999	(China) Wang Zhongwei	Am	4
(China) Climax Racing	Mercedes-AMG GT3 Evo	Mercedes-AMG M159 6.2 L V8	999	(China) Zhou Bihuang	Am	4
GTC
(China) ACM by Blackjack	Lamborghini Huracan Super Trofeo Evo2	Lamborghini DGF 5.2 L V10	2	(China) Li Sicheng	PA	1
(China) ACM by Blackjack	Lamborghini Huracan Super Trofeo Evo2	Lamborghini DGF 5.2 L V10	2	(China) Zhang Hongyu	PA	1
(China) ACM by Blackjack	Lamborghini Huracan Super Trofeo Evo2	Lamborghini DGF 5.2 L V10	2	(China) Li Sicheng	Am	2–3
(China) ACM by Blackjack	Lamborghini Huracan Super Trofeo Evo2	Lamborghini DGF 5.2 L V10	2	(China) Jack Pang	Am	2–3
(China) Blackjack Racing	Lamborghini Huracan Super Trofeo Evo2	Lamborghini DGF 5.2 L V10	2	(China) Liu Zexuan	Am	4
(China) Blackjack Racing	Lamborghini Huracan Super Trofeo Evo2	Lamborghini DGF 5.2 L V10	2	(China) Tang Chengxie	Am	4
(China) 610 Racing	Porsche 911 GT3 Cup (992)	Porsche 4.0 L H6	6	(China) Bian Ye	Am	1
(China) 610 Racing	Porsche 911 GT3 Cup (992)	Porsche 4.0 L H6	6	(China) Lang Jiru	Am	2
(China) 610 Racing	Porsche 911 GT3 Cup (992)	Porsche 4.0 L H6	6	(China) Liu Zexuan	Am	2
(China) 610 Racing	Porsche 911 GT3 Cup (992)	Porsche 4.0 L H6	29	(China) Gan Erfu	Am	4
(China) 610 Racing	Porsche 911 GT3 Cup (992)	Porsche 4.0 L H6	29	(China) Wang Jiahao	Am	4
(China) 610 Racing	Porsche 911 GT3 Cup (992)	Porsche 4.0 L H6	62	(China) Bao Tian	Am	1
(China) 610 Racing	Porsche 911 GT3 Cup (992)	Porsche 4.0 L H6	99	(China) Deng Tianfu	Am	4
(China) 610 Racing	Porsche 911 GT3 Cup (992)	Porsche 4.0 L H6	99	(China) Zhang Meng	Am	4
(China) BC Racing by 610	Audi R8 LMS Cup	Audi V10	21	(Chinese Taipei) Johnson Huang	PA	4
(China) BC Racing by 610	Audi R8 LMS Cup	Audi V10	21	(Hong Kong) Shaun Thong	PA	4
GTS (SRO GT4)
(China) GAHA Harmony Racing	BMW M4 GT4 (F82)	BMW S58 3.0 L twin-turbo I6	7	(China) Wang Yongjie	Am	1
(China) GAHA Harmony Racing	BMW M4 GT4 (F82)	BMW S58 3.0 L twin-turbo I6	7	(China) Tenn Wu	Am	1
(China) GAHA Racing with KRC	BMW M4 GT4 (F82)	BMW S58 3.0 L twin-turbo I6	7	(China) Tenn Wu	Am	2
(China) GAHA Racing with KRC	BMW M4 GT4 (F82)	BMW S58 3.0 L twin-turbo I6	7	(China) Wang Yongjie	Am	2
(China) GAHA Racing	BMW M4 GT4 (G82) Evo	BMW S58 3.0 L twin-turbo I6	7	(China) Wang Yongjie	Am	4
(China) GAHA Racing	BMW M4 GT4 (G82) Evo	BMW S58 3.0 L twin-turbo I6	7	(China) Yuan Runqi	Am	4
(China) 610 Racing	Porsche 718 Cayman GT4 RS Clubsport	Porsche 4.0 L H6	9	(China) Gan Erfu	Am	3
(China) 610 Racing	Porsche 718 Cayman GT4 RS Clubsport	Porsche 4.0 L H6	9	(China) Wang Jiahao	Am	3
(China) Team TRC	Mercedes-AMG GT4	Mercedes-AMG M159 6.2 L V8	12	(Hong Kong) Fok Wai Ming	Am	2
(China) Team KRC	BMW M4 GT4 (G82) Evo	BMW S58 3.0 L twin-turbo I6	58	(Chinese Taipei) Ethan Ho	PA	3–4
(China) Team KRC	BMW M4 GT4 (G82) Evo	BMW S58 3.0 L twin-turbo I6	58	(China) Ruan Cunfan	PA	3–4
(China) Incipient Racing	Audi R8 LMS GT4	Audi DAR 5.2 L V10	69	(China) Chen Sitong	Am	1–2
(China) Incipient Racing	Audi R8 LMS GT4	Audi DAR 5.2 L V10	69	(China) Air Tong	Am	1–2
(China) Incipient Racing	Audi R8 LMS GT4	Audi DAR 5.2 L V10	777	(China) He Baifeng	PA	4
(China) Incipient Racing	Audi R8 LMS GT4	Audi DAR 5.2 L V10	777	(China) Li Jiahao	PA	4
(China) Incipient Racing	Audi R8 LMS GT4	Audi DAR 5.2 L V10	650	(China) Xiao Min	Am	1
(China) Incipient Racing	Audi R8 LMS GT4	Audi DAR 5.2 L V10	650	(China) Archer Wu	Am	1
(China) Incipient Racing	Porsche 718 Cayman GT4 RS Clubsport	Porsche 4.0 L H6	650	(China) Archer Wu	Am	2, 4
(China) Incipient Racing	Porsche 718 Cayman GT4 RS Clubsport	Porsche 4.0 L H6	650	(China) Che Shaoyi	Am	2, 4
(China) Climax Racing	Porsche 718 Cayman GT4 RS Clubsport	Porsche 4.0 L H6	222	(China) Yin Jinchao	Am	2
(China) Climax Racing	Porsche 718 Cayman GT4 RS Clubsport	Porsche 4.0 L H6	222	(China) Tony Yu	Am	2
(Germany) Maxmore W&S Motorsport	Porsche 718 Cayman GT4 RS Clubsport	Porsche 4.0 L H6	927	(Germany) Finn Zulauf	PA	1
(Germany) Maxmore W&S Motorsport	Porsche 718 Cayman GT4 RS Clubsport	Porsche 4.0 L H6	927	(Germany) Moritz Berrenberg	PA	1
(Germany) Maxmore W&S Motorsport	Porsche 718 Cayman GT4 RS Clubsport	Porsche 4.0 L H6	927	(Germany) Moritz Berrenberg	Am	2–4
(China) RSR GT Racing	Porsche 718 Cayman GT4 RS Clubsport	Porsche 4.0 L H6	977	(China) Han Liqun	Am	All
(China) RSR GT Racing	Porsche 718 Cayman GT4 RS Clubsport	Porsche 4.0 L H6	977	(China) Tian Weiyuan	Am	All

Icon	Class
P	Pro
PA	Pro-Am
Am	Am
M	Master

== Results ==
Bold indicates overall winner.

Rnd.		Circuit	GT3 winner	GTS winner	GTC winner
1	1	(China) Shanghai	(Chinese Taipei) **No. 90 FIST Team AAI**	(Germany) No. 927 Maxmore W&S Motorsport	(China) No. 6 610 Racing
1	1	(China) Shanghai	**(Sweden) Erik Johansson** **(China) Yu Lin**	(Germany) Moritz Berrenberg (Germany) Finn Zulauf	(China) Bian Fengjun
1	2	(China) Shanghai	(Chinese Taipei) **No. 90 FIST Team AAI**	(Germany) No. 927 Maxmore W&S Motorsport	(China) No. 6 610 Racing
1	2	(China) Shanghai	**(Sweden) Erik Johansson** **(China) Yu Lin**	(Germany) Moritz Berrenberg (Germany) Finn Zulauf	(China) Bian Fengjun
2	1	(China) Shanghai	**(Chinese Taipei) No. 90 FIST Team AAI**	(Germany) No. 927 Maxmore W&S Motorsport	(China) No. 2 AdamCar Motorsport by Blackjack
2	1	(China) Shanghai	**(China) Huang Ruohan** **(Sweden) Erik Johansson**	(Germany) Moritz Berrenberg	(China) Li Sicheng (China) Jack Pang
2	2	(China) Shanghai	**(Chinese Taipei) No. 90 FIST Team AAI**	(Germany) No. 927 Maxmore W&S Motorsport	(China) No. 2 AdamCar Motorsport by Blackjack
2	2	(China) Shanghai	**(China) Huang Ruohan** **(Sweden) Erik Johansson**	(Germany) Moritz Berrenberg	(China) Li Sicheng (China) Jack Pang
3	1	(China) Zhuhai	**(China) No. 55 Origine Motorsport**	(Germany) No. 927 Maxmore W&S Motorsport	(China) No. 2 AdamCar Motorsport by Blackjack
3	1	(China) Zhuhai	**(China) Lu Wei** **(China) Xie Xinzhe**	(Germany) Moritz Berrenberg	(China) Li Sicheng (China) Jack Pang
3	2	(China) Zhuhai	**(China) No. 33 610 Racing**	(China) No. 58 Team KRC	No finishers
3	2	(China) Zhuhai	**(China) Peter Li** **(China) Yang Baijie**	(Chinese Taipei) Ethan Ho (China) Ruan Cunfan	No finishers
4	1	(China) Shanghai	(China) **No. 37 Winhere Harmony Racing**	(Germany) No. 927 Maxmore W&S Motorsport	(China) No. 21 BC Racing by 610
4	1	(China) Shanghai	**(China) Deng Yi**	(Germany) Moritz Berrenberg	(Chinese Taipei) Johnson Huang (Hong Kong) Shaun Thong
4	2	(China) Shanghai	**(China) No. 710 Climax Racing**	(Germany) No. 927 Maxmore W&S Motorsport	(China) No. 99 610 Racing
4	2	(China) Shanghai	**(China) Chen Fangping** **(Finland) Elias Seppänen**	(Germany) Moritz Berrenberg	(China) Zhang Meng (China) Roy Tang

== Championship Standings ==
=== Drivers' Standings ===
==== Overall ====
Pos.	Driver	Team	SHA		SHA		ZHU		SHA		Points
Pos.	Driver	Team	R1	R2	R1	R2	R1	R2	R1	R2	Points
GT3
1	(Sweden) Erik Johansson	(Chinese Taipei) FIST Team AAI	1	1	1	1	2	2	4	2	166
2	(China) Lin Yu	(Chinese Taipei) FIST Team AAI	1	1			2	2	4	2	116
3	(China) Lu Wei (China) Xie Xinzhe	(China) Origine Motorsport	2	4	3	3	1	9	9	8	93
4	(China) Deng Yi	(China) Winhere Harmony Racing			2	2			1	5	71
5	(China) Chen Fangping (Finland) Elias Seppänen	(China) Climax Racing	15	14	DNS	4	8	Ret	2	1	59
6	(China) Chen Yin-yu	(Chinese Taipei) FIST Team AAI	12	7	5	8	4	7	5	6	56
7	(China) Huang Ruohan	(China) FIST Team AAI			1	1					50
7	(China) Liu Kai Shun	(China) 610 Racing	3	2							50
7	(China) Liu Kai Shun	(China) Harmony Racing					9	3	WD	WD	50
8	(China) Yang Baijie	(China) 610 Racing			7	Ret	3	1	6	Ret	48
8	(China) Li Zhicong	(China) 610 Racing					3	1	6	Ret	48
9	(China) Luo Kailuo	(China) Winhere Harmony Racing			2	2					40
9	(China) Luo Kailuo	(China) Origine Motorsport							8	11	40
10	(Belgium) Ugo de Wilde	(Chinese Taipei) FIST Team AAI	12	7	5	8			5	6	38
11	(China) Chen Yechong	(China) UNO Racing Team	10	8	4	5	DNS	5	14	14	37
12	(China) Li Hanyu (China) Ou Ziyang	(China) Team DIXCEL Harmony Racing	9	6							35
12	(China) Li Hanyu (China) Ou Ziyang	(China) Team DIXCEL / GAHA with KRC			12	7					35
12	(China) Li Hanyu (China) Ou Ziyang	(China) Team DIXCEL by GAHA Racing					12	4	11	3	35
13	(China) Yu Kuai	(China) 610 Racing	3	2							33
14	(China) Liu Hangcheng	(China) Winhere Harmony Racing	4	15							32
14	(China) Liu Hangcheng	(China) 33R Harmony Racing			5	6					32
14	(China) Liu Hangcheng	(China) HEHEHE Racing by 33R HAR					6	13			32
14	(China) Liu Hangcheng	(China) Origine Motorsport							8	11	32
15	(China) Ye Sichao	(China) GAHA Racing					Ret	8	3	4	31
16	(Finland) Jesse Krohn	(China) GAHA Racing							3	4	27
17	(China) Dennis Zhang	(China) 33R Harmony Racing	Ret	6							27
17	(China) Dennis Zhang	(China) Harmony Racing					9	3			27
17	(China) Dennis Zhang	(China) 610 Racing							13	9	27
18	(Hong Kong) "Rio"	(China) UNO Racing Team	10	8	4	5					27
19	(China) Zach Xu	(China) 610 Racing	5	3			11	Ret			25
19	(China) Cui Yue	(China) 610 Racing	5	3							25
20	(China) Cao Qikuan (China) Shen Jian	(China) Youpeng Racing	8	12	9	12	5	6			24
21	(Finland) William Alatalo	(Chinese Taipei) FIST Team AAI					4	7			18
22	(China) Pan Deng (China) Yang Xiaowei	(China) 610 Racing	16	5	15	10	8	12	15	10	18
23	(China) Jason Gu	(China) Origine Motorsport	7	9	6	9	Ret	11	DNS	17	18
23	(China) Min Heng	(China) Origine Motorsport	7	9	6	9	Ret	11	DNS	WD	18
24	(Macau) Lu Zhiwei	(China) 33R Harmony Racing	Ret	6							16
24	(Macau) Lu Zhiwei	(China) HEHEHE Racing by 33R HAR					6	13			16
24	(Macau) Lu Zhiwei	(China) Harmony Racing							WD	WD	16
25	(China) David Chen	(China) Winhere Harmony Racing	4	15							12
26	(China) Zhang Mingyang (China) Zhang Zhendong	(China) ParkingPark Racing by Z.SPEED							7	7	12
27	(China) Song Yiran	(China) UNO Racing Team					DNS	5	14	14	10
28	(China) Hu Haoheng	(China) 33R Harmony Racing			5	6					8
29	(China) David Pun (China) Wang Yibo	(China) UNO Racing Team	6	Ret					12	13	8
30	(China) Chang Chienshang (Chinese Taipei) Chuang Chi Shun	(China) LEVEL Motorsports			7	11					6
31	(China) Yang Haojie (China) Jiang Nan	(China) 33R Harmony Racing			8	13	10	10	17	15	6
32	(China) Bian Ye	(China) GAHA Racing					Ret	8			4
33	(China) Wang Zhongwei	(China) HEHEHE Racing by 33R HAR	17	10							2
33	(China) Wang Zhongwei	(China) Climax Racing							10	12	2
33	(China) Zhou Bihuang	(China) Climax Racing							10	12	1
34	(China) Jiang Jiawei	(China) LEVEL Motorsports	11	Ret	10	14					1
34	(China) Jiang Jiawei	(China) Origine Motorsport							16	16	1
34	(China) Yang Shuo	(China) LEVEL Motorsports	11	Ret	10	14					1
35	(China) Steven Zhou	(China) HEHEHE Racing by 33R HAR	17	10	14	15			DNS	WD	1
—	(China) Ray Wu (China) Xing Yanbin	(China) Incipient Racing	13	13							0
—	(Singapore) Zhen Mingwei	(China) Gaga 33R HAR	14	16							0
—	(Singapore) Zhen Mingwei	(China) HEHEHE Racing by 33R HAR			14	15					0
—	(China) Wang Yang	(China) Gaga 33R HAR	14	16							0
—	(China) Wang Yang	(China) HEHEHE Racing by 33R HAR							DNS	WD	0
—	(China) Lu Wenlong	(China) 610 Racing			7	Ret	11	Ret			0
—	(China) Bao Tian	(China) 610 Racing					13	Ret			0
—	(China) Tang Ruobin	(China) Origine Motorsport							16	16	0
—	(China) Xiao Min	(China) Incipient Racing	WD	WD					18	18	0
—	(China) Air Tong	(China) Incipient Racing							18	18	0
GTC
1	(China) Li Sicheng	(China) ACM by Blackjack	2	2	1	1	1	Ret			111
2	(China) Bao Tian	(China) 610 Racing	Ret	3	2	2					51
3	(China) Jack Pang	(China) ACM by Blackjack			1	1					50
3	(China) Bian Ye	(China) 610 Racing	1	1							50
4	(China) Deng Tianfu (China) Zhang Meng	(China) 610 Racing							2	1	43
5	(China) Zhang Hongyu	(China) ACM by Blackjack	2	2							36
6	(China) Gan Erfu (China) Wang Jiahao	(China) 610 Racing							3	2	33
7	(Chinese Taipei) Johnson Huang (Hong Kong) Shaun Thong	(China) BC Racing by 610							1	Ret	25
8	(China) Liu Zexuan	(China) 610 Racing			Ret	WD					12
8	(China) Liu Zexuan	(China) Blackjack Racing							4	Ret	12
8	(China) Tang Chengxie	(China) Blackjack Racing							4	Ret	12
—	(China) Lang Jiru	(China) 610 Racing			Ret	WD					0
GTS
1	(Germany) Moritz Berrenberg	(Germany) Maxmore W&S Motorsport	1	1	1	1	1	2	1	2	186
2	(China) Han Liqun (China) Tian Weiyuan	(China) RSR GT Racing	4	4	5	2	3	3	5	5	102
3	(China) Ethan Ho	(China) Team KRC					2	1	2	1	86
4	(China) Wang Yongjie	(China) GAHA Harmony Racing	3	3							83
4	(China) Wang Yongjie	(China) GAHA Racing with KRC			2	4					83
4	(China) Wang Yongjie	(China) GAHA Racing							6	3	83
5	(China) Ruan Cunfan	(China) Team KRC					2	1	2	WD	61
6	(China) Tenn Wu	(China) Harmony Racing	3	3							60
6	(China) GAHA Racing with KRC			2	4						60
7	(China) Archer Wu	(China) Incipient Racing	Ret	5	Ret	3			3	4	52
8	(China) Chen Sitong (China) Air Tong	(China) Incipient Racing	2	2	3	Ret					51
9	(China) Che Shaoyi	(China) Incipient Racing			Ret	3			3	4	42
10	(Germany) Finn Zulauf	(Germany) Maxmore W&S Motorsport	1	1							25
11	(China) Yuan Runqi	(China) GAHA Racing							6	3	23
12	(China) Yin Jinchao (China) Tony Yu	(China) Climax Racing			4	5					22
13	(China) He Baifeng (China) Li Jiahao	(China) Incipient Racing							4	6	20
14	(Hong Kong) Fok Wai Ming	(China) Team TRC			6	6					16
15	(China) Gan Erfu (China) Wang Jiahao	(China) 610 Racing					4	Ret			12
16	(China) Xiao Min	(China) Incipient Racing	Ret	5							10
Pos.	Driver	Team	R1	R2	R1	R2	R1	R2	R1	R2	Points
Pos.	Driver	Team	SHA		SHA		ZHU		SHA		Points

==== Pro-Am ====
Pos.	Driver	Team	SHA		SHA		ZHU		SHA		Points
Pos.	Driver	Team	R1	R2	R1	R2	R1	R2	R1	R2	Points
GT3
1	(Sweden) Erik Johansson	(Chinese Taipei) FIST Team AAI	1	1	1	1	2	2	3	2	169
2	(China) Lin Yu	(Chinese Taipei) FIST Team AAI	1	1			2	2	3	2	119
3	(China) Lu Wei (China) Xie Xinzhe	(China) Origine Motorsport	2	3	2	2	1	5	8	6	117
4	(China) Chen Yin-yu	(Chinese Taipei) FIST Team AAI	7	4	4	5	4	4	4	4	88
5	(China) Chen Fangping (Finland) Elias Seppänen	(China) Climax Racing	8	6	DNS	3	5	Ret	1	1	87
6	(Belgium) Ugo de Wilde	(Chinese Taipei) FIST Team AAI	7	4	4	5			4	4	64
7	(China) Chen Yechong	(China) UNO Racing Team	5	5	3	4	4	WD			59
8	(China) Yang Baijie	(China) 610 Racing			7	Ret	3	1	5	Ret	56
9	(China) Huang Ruohan	(China) FIST Team AAI			1	1					50
10	(China) Li Zhicong	(China) 610 Racing					3	1	5	Ret	50
11	(Hong Kong) "Rio"	(China) UNO Racing Team	5	5	3	4					47
12	(China) Zach Xu	(China) 610 Racing	4	2			7	Ret			36
13	(Finland) Jesse Krohn (China) Ye Sichao	(China) GAHA Racing							2	3	33
14	(China) Liu Hangcheng	(China) Winhere Harmony Racing	3	7							33
14	(China) Liu Hangcheng	(China) Origine Motorsport							7	7	33
15	(China) Cui Yue	(China) 610 Racing	4	2							30
16	(Finland) William Alatalo	(Chinese Taipei) FIST Team AAI					4	4			24
17	(Hong Kong) Liu Kaishun (China) Dennis Zhang	(China) Harmony Racing					6	3			23
18	(China) Jiang Jiawei (China) Yang Shuo	(China) LEVEL Motorsports	6	Ret	6	7					22
19	(China) David Chen	(China) Winhere Harmony Racing	3	7							21
20	(China) Chang Chienshang (Chinese Taipei) Chuang Chi-shun	(China) LEVEL Motorsports			5	6					18
21	(China) Zhang Mingyang (China) Zhang Zhendong	(China) ParkingPark Racing by Z.SPEED							6	5	18
22	(China) Lu Wenlong	(China) 610 Racing			7	Ret	7	Ret			12
23	(China) Luo Kailuo	(China) Origine Motorsport							7	7	12
Pos.	Driver	Team	R1	R2	R1	R2	R1	R2	R1	R2	Points
Pos.	Driver	Team	SHA		SHA		ZHU		SHA		Points

==== Am ====
Pos.	Driver	Team	SHA		SHA		ZHU		SHA		Points
Pos.	Driver	Team	R1	R2	R1	R2	R1	R2	R1	R2	Points
GT3
1	(China) Li Hanyu (China) Ou Ziyang	(China) Team DIXCEL Harmony Racing	3	5							133
1	(China) Li Hanyu (China) Ou Ziyang	(China) Team DIXCEL / GAHA with KRC			5	2					133
1	(China) Li Hanyu (China) Ou Ziyang	(China) Team DIXCEL by GAHA Racing					4	1	2	1	133
2	(China) Pan Deng (China) Yang Xiaowei	(China) 610 Racing	5	1	4	4	2	6	6	3	108
3	(China) Jason Gu	(China) Origine Motorsport	2	3	1	3	Ret	5	DNS	9	85
4	(China) Min Heng	(China) Origine Motorsport	2	3	1	3	Ret	5	DNS	WD	83
5	(China) Jiang Nan (China) Yang Haojie	(China) 33R Harmony Racing			2	5	3	4	8	7	65
6	(China) Liu Hangcheng	(China) 33R Harmony Racing			6	1					64
6	(China) Liu Hangcheng	(China) HEHEHE Racing by 33R HAR					1	7			64
7	(China) Wang Zhongwei	(China) HEHEHE Racing by 33R HAR	6	4							57
7	(China) Wang Zhongwei	(China) Climax Racing							1	4	57
8	(China) David Pun (China) Wang Yibo	(China) UNO Racing Team	1	Ret					3	5	50
9	(Macau) Lu Zhiwei	(China) 33R Harmony Racing	Ret	2							49
9	(Macau) Lu Zhiwei	(China) HEHEHE Racing by 33R HAR					1	7			49
10	(China) Dennis Zhang	(China) 33R Harmony Racing	Ret	2							48
10	(China) Dennis Zhang	(China) 610 Racing							4	2	48
11	(Singapore) Zhen Mingwei	(China) Gaga 33R HAR	4	6							43
11	(Singapore) Zhen Mingwei	(China) HEHEHE Racing by 33R HAR			3	6					43
12	(China) Steven Zhou	(China) HEHEHE Racing by 33R HAR	6	4	3	6					43
13	(China) Zhou Bihuang	(China) Climax Racing							1	4	37
14	(China) Chen Yechong (China) Song Yiran	(China) UNO Racing Team					DNS	2	5	6	36
15	(China) Hu Haoheng	(China) 33R Harmony Racing			6	1					33
16	(China) Wang Yang	(China) Gaga 33R HAR	4	6							20
17	(China) Bian Ye (China) Ye Sichao	(China) GAHA Racing					Ret	3			15
18	(China) Bao Tian	(China) 610 Racing					5	Ret			10
18	(China) Jiang Jiawei (China) Tang Ruobin	(China) Origine Motorsport							7	8	10
GTS
1	(Germany) Moritz Berrenberg	(Germany) Maxmore W&S Motorsport			1	1	1	1	1	1	150
2	(China) Han Liqun (China) Tian Weiyuan	(China) RSR GT Racing	3	3	5	2	2	2	3	3	124
3	(China) Wang Yongjie (China) Tenn Wu	(China) GAHA Harmony Racing	2	2							66
3	(China) Wang Yongjie (China) Tenn Wu	(China) GAHA Racing with KRC			2	4					66
4	(China) Air Tong (China) Chen Sitong	(China) Incipient Racing	1	1	3	Ret					65
5	(China) Archer Wu	(China) Incipient Racing	Ret	4	Ret	3			2	2	63
6	(China) Che Shaoyi	(China) Incipient Racing			Ret	3			2	2	51
7	(China) Yin Jinchao (China) Tony Yu	(China) Climax Racing			4	5					22
8	(Hong Kong) Fok Wai Ming	(China) Team TRC			6	6					16
9	(China) Gan Erfu (China) Wang Jiahao	(China) 610 Racing					3	Ret			15
10	(China) Xiao Min	(China) Incipient Racing	Ret	4							12
Pos.	Driver	Team	R1	R2	R1	R2	R1	R2	R1	R2	Points
Pos.	Driver	Team	SHA		SHA		ZHU		SHA		Points

==== Masters ====
Pos.	Driver	Team	SHA		SHA		ZHU		SHA		Points
Pos.	Driver	Team	R1	R2	R1	R2	R1	R2	R1	R2	Points
GT3
1	(China) Cao Qikuan (China) Shen Jian	(China) Youpeng Racing	1	1	1	1	1	1			150
2	(China) Xiao Min	(China) Incipient Racing							1	1	50
3	(China) Ray Wu (China) Xing Yanbin	(China) Incipient Racing	2	2							36
Drivers not eligible for Championship points.
—	(China) Air Tong	(China) Incipient Racing							1	1	0
Pos.	Driver	Team	R1	R2	R1	R2	R1	R2	R1	R2	Points
Pos.	Driver	Team	SHA		SHA		ZHU		SHA		Points

=== Teams' Standings ===
Pos.	Team	SHA		SHA		ZHU		SHA		Points
Pos.	Team	R1	R2	R1	R2	R1	R2	R1	R2	Points
GT3
1	(Chinese Taipei) FIST Team AAI	1	1	1	1	2	2	4	2	222
1	(Chinese Taipei) FIST Team AAI	12	9	6	8	4	7	5	6	222
2	(China) 610Racing	3	2	7	10	3	1	6	9	116
2	(China) 610Racing	5	4	15	Ret	7	12	13	10	116
3	(China) Origine Motorsport	2	5	3	3	1	9	8	8	115
3	(China) Origine Motorsport	7	10	8	9	Ret	11	9	11	115
4	(China) Winhere Harmony Racing	4	15	2	2			1	5	83
5	(China) Climax Racing	15	14	DNS	4	8	Ret	2	1	60
5	(China) Climax Racing							10	12	60
6	(China) UNO Racing Team	6	3	4	5	Ret	5	12	13	44
6	(China) UNO Racing Team	10	Ret					14	14	44
7	(China) GAHA Racing					Ret	8	3	4	31
8	(China) 33R Harmony Racing	Ret	8	5	6	6	10	17	15	30
8	(China) 33R Harmony Racing			10	13	10	13			30
9	(China) Team DIXCEL by GAHA Racing					12	4	11	3	27
10	(China) Youpeng Racing	8	12	11	12	5	6			24
11	(China) Harmony Racing					9	3	WD	WD	17
12	(China) ParkingPark Racing by Z.Speed							7	7	12
13	(China) Level Motorsports	11	Ret	9	11					7
13	(China) Level Motorsports			13	14					7
14	(China) Team DIXCEL / GAHA with KRC			12	7					6
15	(China) Team DIXCEL by Harmony Racing	9	6							2
16	(China) HEHEHE Racing by 33R HAR	17	11	14	15			DNS	WD	1
—	(China) Incipient Racing	13	14					18	18	0
—	(China) Gaga 33R HAR	14	16							0
GTC
1	(China) 610Racing	1	1	1	2			2	1	167
1	(China) 610Racing	Ret	3	Ret	WD			3	2	167
2	(China) ACM by Blackjack	2	2	2	1	1	Ret			111
3	(China) BC Racing by 610							1	Ret	25
4	(China) Blackjack Racing							4	Ret	12
GTS
1	(Germany) Maxmore W&S Motorsport	1	1	1	1	1	2	1	2	186
2	(China) Incipient Racing	2	2	5	3			3	4	123
2	(China) Incipient Racing	Ret	5	Ret	Ret			4	6	123
3	(China) RSR GT Racing	4	4	3	2	3	3	5	5	102
4	(China) Team KRC					2	1	2	1	86
5	(China) GAHA Racing with KRC			2	4					30
6	(China) GAHA Harmony Racing	3	3							30
7	(China) GAHA Racing							6	3	23
8	(China) Climax Racing			4	5					22
9	(China) Team TRC			6	6					16
10	(China) 610Racing					4	Ret			12
Pos.	Driver	R1	R2	R1	R2	R1	R2	R1	R2	Points
Pos.	Driver	SHA		SHA		ZHU		SHA		Points
