= 2025 TCR China Challenge =

The 2025 TCR China Challenge is the second part of the TCR's Chinese Touring Car Championship.

== Calendar ==
The provisional 2025 schedule was announced on 12 February 2025, with six events scheduled. The season will begin at Shanghai International Circuit with the TCR Asia on 25 April and end at Zhuzhou International Circuit on 2 November.

Part of the TCR Asia Series
Part of the TCR China Championship

Rnd.		Circuit	Date	Supporting
1	1	(China) Shanghai International Circuit, Jiading, Shanghai	25–27 April	TCR China Championship; China GT Championship; CTCC China Cup; Lynk & Co Auto Challenge
1	2	(China) Shanghai International Circuit, Jiading, Shanghai	25–27 April	TCR China Championship; China GT Championship; CTCC China Cup; Lynk & Co Auto Challenge
2	3	(China) Ningbo International Circuit, Beilun, Ningbo	9–11 May	TCR China Championship; CTCC China Cup
2	4	(China) Ningbo International Circuit, Beilun, Ningbo	9–11 May	TCR China Championship; CTCC China Cup
3	5	(China) Zhejiang International Circuit, Zhejiang, Shaoxing	27–29 June	CTCC China Cup
3	6	(China) Zhejiang International Circuit, Zhejiang, Shaoxing	27–29 June	CTCC China Cup
4	7	(China) Ordos International Circuit, Kangbashi, Ordos City	8–10 August	CTCC China Cup
4	8	(China) Ordos International Circuit, Kangbashi, Ordos City	8–10 August	CTCC China Cup
5	9	(China) Shanghai International Circuit, Jiading, Shanghai	19–21 September	China GT Championship; CTCC China Cup; Lynk & Co Auto Challenge
5	10	(China) Shanghai International Circuit, Jiading, Shanghai	19–21 September	China GT Championship; CTCC China Cup; Lynk & Co Auto Challenge
6	11	(China) Zhuzhou International Circuit, Hunan, Zhuzhou	31 October–2 November	TCR World Tour; TCR Asia Series; CTCC China Cup; X-racing ETCR
6	12	(China) Zhuzhou International Circuit, Hunan, Zhuzhou	31 October–2 November	TCR World Tour; TCR Asia Series; CTCC China Cup; X-racing ETCR

== Results ==
Rnd.		Circuit	Pole position	Winning driver
1	1	(China) Shanghai International Circuit	(Chinese Taipei) CHANG Chien-Shang	(Chinese Taipei) CHANG Chien-Shang
1	2	(China) Shanghai International Circuit		(China) LIU Zichen
2	3	(China) Ningbo International Circuit	(Chinese Taipei) CHANG Chien-Shang	(Chinese Taipei) CHANG Chien-Shang
2	4	(China) Ningbo International Circuit		(China) LIU Zichen
3	5	(China) Zhejiang International Circuit	(China) SUN Juran	(Chinese Taipei) CHANG Chien-Shang
3	6	(China) Zhejiang International Circuit		(China) LIU Zichen
4	7	(China) Ordos International Circuit	(China) SUN Juran	(China) LIU Zichen
4	8	(China) Ordos International Circuit		(China) SUN Juran
5	9	(China) Shanghai International Circuit	(China) LIU Zichen	(China) LIU Zichen
5	10	(China) Shanghai International Circuit		(Hong Kong) William CHEUNG Wang Chi
6	11	(China) Zhuzhou International Circuit	(China) LIU Zichen	(China) LIU Zichen
6	12	(China) Zhuzhou International Circuit		(China) TANG Zihao
