= Songshan District, Chifeng =

Songshan 松山区 • ᠰᠦᠩ ᠱᠠᠨ ᠲᠣᠭᠣᠷᠢᠭ
- District
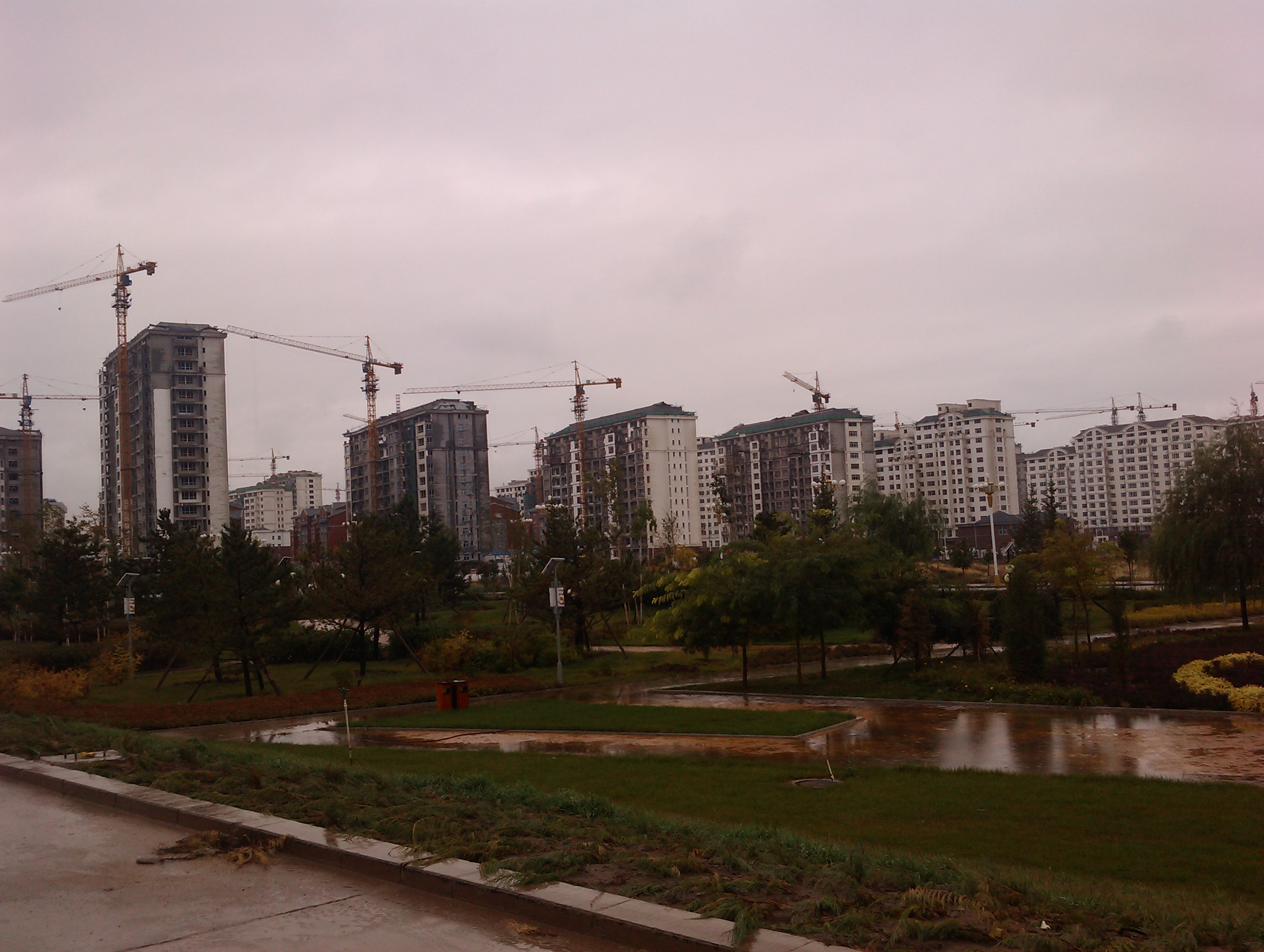

- Location within Inner Mongolia Location within China
- Coordinates (Songshan District government): 42°17′59″N 118°54′58″E
- Country: China
- Autonomous region: Inner Mongolia
- Prefecture-level city: Chifeng
- District seat: Mujiayingzi

Area
  - Total: 5,629 km^{2} (2,173 sq mi)
- Elevation: 567 m (1,860 ft)

Population (2020)
  - Total: 706,312
  - Density: 125.5/km^{2} (325.0/sq mi)
- Time zone: UTC+8 (China Standard)
- Postal code: 024005
- Website: www.ssq.gov.cn

Songshan District, Chifeng

Chinese name
- Simplified Chinese: 松山区
- Traditional Chinese: 松山區
Transcriptions
Standard Mandarin
- Hanyu Pinyin: Sōngshān Qū

Mongolian name
- Mongolian Cyrillic: Сөн шин дугараг
- Mongolian script: ᠰᠦᠩ ᠱᠠᠨ ᠲᠣᠭᠣᠷᠢᠭ
Transcriptions
- SASM/GNC: Süŋ šan toɣoriɣ

Songshan District (Mongolian: ᠰᠦᠩ ᠱᠠᠨ ᠲᠣᠭᠣᠷᠢᠭ; Chinese: 松山区) is a district of the city of Chifeng, Inner Mongolia, China. The district spans 5,629 square kilometers, and has a population of 608,883 as of 2019.

== Administrative divisions ==
The district is divided into 8 subdistricts, 9 towns, 4 townships, and 1 ethnic township. These township-level divisions are then further divided into 244 administrative villages, 44 urban residential communities, and 3 rural residential communities.

Name	Simplified Chinese	Hanyu Pinyin	Mongolian (Hudum Script)	Mongolian (Cyrillic)	Administrative division code
Subdistricts
Zhenxing Subdistrict	振兴街道	Zhènxīng Jiēdào	ᠵᠧᠨ ᠰᠢᠩ ᠵᠡᠭᠡᠯᠢ ᠭᠤᠳᠤᠮᠵᠢ	Жен шин зээл гудамж	150404001
Xiangyang Subdistrict	向阳街道	Xiàngyáng Jiēdào	ᠰᠢᠶᠠᠩ ᠶᠠᠩ ᠵᠡᠭᠡᠯᠢ ᠭᠤᠳᠤᠮᠵᠢ	Шиян ян зээл гудамж	150404002
Songzhou Subdistrict	松州街道	Sōngzhōu Jiēdào	ᠰᠦᠩ ᠵᠧᠦ ᠵᠡᠭᠡᠯᠢ ᠭᠤᠳᠤᠮᠵᠢ	Сөн жүү зээл гудамж	150404003
Tiedong Subdistrict	铁东街道	Tiědōng Jiēdào	ᠲᠡᠮᠦᠷ ᠵᠠᠮ ᠤᠨ ᠵᠡᠭᠦᠨᠳᠠᠬᠢ ᠵᠡᠭᠡᠯᠢ ᠭᠤᠳᠤᠮᠵᠢ	Дамар замын зүүндэх зээл гудамж	150404004
Yulong Subdistrict	玉龙街道	Yùlóng Jiēdào	ᠢᠦᠢ ᠯᠦᠩ ᠵᠡᠭᠡᠯᠢ ᠭᠤᠳᠤᠮᠵᠢ	Юй лүн зээл гудамж	150404400
Quanning Subdistrict	全宁街道	Quánníng Jiēdào	ᠴᠢᠦᠸᠠᠨ ᠨᠢᠩ ᠵᠡᠭᠡᠯᠢ ᠭᠤᠳᠤᠮᠵᠢ	Чиован нин зээл гудамж	150404401
Hinggan Subdistrict	兴安街道	Xīng'ān Jiēdào	ᠬᠢᠩᠭᠠᠨ ᠵᠡᠭᠡᠯᠢ ᠭᠤᠳᠤᠮᠵᠢ	Хянган зээл гудамж	150404407
Songcheng Subdistrict	松城街道	Sōngchéng Jiēdào	ᠰᠦᠩ ᠴᠧᠩ ᠵᠡᠭᠡᠯᠢ ᠭᠤᠳᠤᠮᠵᠢ	Сөн цэн зээл гудамж	150404408
Towns
Mujiayingzi Town	穆家营子镇	Mùjiāyíngzi Zhèn	ᠮᠤ ᠵᠢᠶᠠ ᠶᠢᠩᠽᠢ ᠪᠠᠯᠭᠠᠰᠤ	Мү жье енз балгас	150404100
Quthulang Town	初头朗镇	Chūtóulǎng Zhèn	ᠴᠢᠳᠬᠤᠯᠠᠩ ᠪᠠᠯᠭᠠᠰᠤ	Цутгалан балгас	150404101
Damiao Town	大庙镇	Dàmiào Zhèn	ᠳ᠋ᠠ ᠮᠢᠶᠣᠤ ᠪᠠᠯᠭᠠᠰᠤᠨ	Да мяо балгас	150404102
Wangfu Town	王府镇	Wángfǔ Zhèn	ᠸᠠᠩ ᠬᠣᠷᠢᠶ᠎ᠠ ᠪᠠᠯᠭᠠᠰᠤ	Ван хороо балгас	150404103
Laofu Town	老府镇	Lǎofǔ Zhèn	ᠬᠠᠭᠤᠴᠢᠨ ᠬᠣᠷᠢᠶ᠎ᠠ ᠪᠠᠯᠭᠠᠰᠤ	Хуучин хороо балгас	150404104
Har Tohoi Town	哈拉道口镇	Hālādàokǒu Zhèn	ᠬᠠᠷ᠎ᠠ ᠲᠣᠬᠣᠢ ᠪᠠᠯᠭᠠᠰᠤ	Хар духай балгас	150404105
Shangguandi Town	上官地镇	Shàngguāndì Zhèn	ᠱᠠᠩ ᠭᠤᠸᠠᠨ ᠳ᠋ᠢ ᠪᠠᠯᠭᠠᠰᠤ	Шан гуан ди балгас	150404106
Angqin Town	安庆镇	Ānqìng Zhèn	ᠠᠩᠴᠢᠨ ᠪᠠᠯᠭᠠᠰᠤ		150404107
Taipingdi Town	太平地镇	Tàipíngdì Zhèn	ᠲᠠᠢ ᠫᠢᠩ ᠳ᠋ᠢ ᠪᠠᠯᠭᠠᠰᠤ	Тай пин ди балгас	150404108
Townships
Xiajiadian Township	夏家店乡	Xiàjiādiàn Xiāng	ᠰᠢᠶᠠ ᠵᠢᠶᠠ ᠳ᠋ᠢᠶᠠᠨ ᠰᠢᠶᠠᠩ	Шье жье даяан шиян	150404201
Chengzi Township	城子乡	Chéngzǐ Xiāng	ᠴᠧᠩᠽᠢ ᠰᠢᠶᠠᠩ	Цэнз шиян	150404202
Dafuyingzi Township	大夫营子乡	Dàfūyíngzi Xiāng	ᠳ᠋ᠠ ᠹᠦ᠋ ᠶᠢᠩᠽᠢ ᠰᠢᠶᠠᠩ	Да фү енз шиян	150404203
Gangzi Township	岗子乡	Gǎngzǐ Xiāng	ᠭᠠᠩᠽᠢ ᠰᠢᠶᠠᠩ	Ганз шиян	150404204
Ethnic township
Dangpudi Manchu Ethnic Township	当铺地满族乡	Dàngpùdì Mǎnzú Xiāng	ᠳ᠋ᠠᠩ ᠫᠦ᠋ ᠳ᠋ᠢ ᠮᠠᠨᠵᠤ ᠦᠨᠳᠦᠰᠦᠲᠡᠨ ᠦ ᠰᠢᠶᠠᠩ	Даан пү ди манж үндэстэний шиян	150404200

== Geography ==
Songshan District is bordered by Ar'horqin Banner to its east, Weichang Manchu and Mongol Autonomous County to its west, Yuanbaoshan District and Hongshan District to its south, Ongniud Banner to its north, Hexigten Banner to its northwest, and Harqin Banner to its southwest.

=== Climate ===
During 2018, the district experienced an average temperature of 8.9 °C (48.0 °F), with a maximum temperature of 36.1 °C (97 °F), and a minimum temperature of −24.2 °C (−12 °F). The district experienced 2783.5 hours of sunshine, 208 frost-free days, and 381.9 millimeters of precipitation.

Climate data for Gangzixiang, Songshan District, elevation 960 m (3,150 ft), (1991–2020 normals)
Month	Jan	Feb	Mar	Apr	May	Jun	Jul	Aug	Sep	Oct	Nov	Dec	Year
Mean daily maximum °C (°F)	−4.7 (23.5)	−0.9 (30.4)	5.6 (42.1)	14.0 (57.2)	21.2 (70.2)	24.9 (76.8)	26.7 (80.1)	25.5 (77.9)	21.2 (70.2)	13.5 (56.3)	3.6 (38.5)	−3.3 (26.1)	12.3 (54.1)
Daily mean °C (°F)	−12.5 (9.5)	−9.0 (15.8)	−1.9 (28.6)	7.1 (44.8)	14.4 (57.9)	18.7 (65.7)	20.8 (69.4)	18.9 (66.0)	13.4 (56.1)	5.8 (42.4)	−3.8 (25.2)	−10.8 (12.6)	5.1 (41.2)
Mean daily minimum °C (°F)	−19.0 (−2.2)	−16.4 (2.5)	−9.4 (15.1)	−0.5 (31.1)	6.5 (43.7)	11.7 (53.1)	14.6 (58.3)	12.2 (54.0)	5.5 (41.9)	−1.4 (29.5)	−10.4 (13.3)	−17.2 (1.0)	−2.0 (28.4)
Average precipitation mm (inches)	0.9 (0.04)	1.9 (0.07)	6.9 (0.27)	16.4 (0.65)	37.6 (1.48)	74.9 (2.95)	120.4 (4.74)	84.7 (3.33)	33.3 (1.31)	14.5 (0.57)	6.1 (0.24)	1.1 (0.04)	398.7 (15.69)
Average precipitation days (≥ 0.1 mm)	1.4	1.7	3.2	4.5	7.6	13.5	14.1	11.4	7.4	4.3	2.4	1.6	73.1
Average snowy days	1.8	2.3	3.6	3.0	0.2	0	0	0	0.1	1.8	3.0	1.9	17.7
Average relative humidity (%)	50	47	45	43	44	60	72	73	64	53	53	52	55
Mean monthly sunshine hours	221.8	230.0	272.7	277.0	293.4	267.1	259.4	266.8	256.5	252.5	217.7	212.1	3,027
Percentage possible sunshine	75	77	73	69	65	59	57	63	69	75	75	76	69
Source: China Meteorological Administration

== Demographics ==
As of 2019, the district's registered population is 608,883, an increase of 8,699 from 2018. Of this, there are 314,013 reported males and 294,870 reported females. The district has a crude birth rate of 11.2 per 1,000, and a crude mortality rate of 3.3 per 1,000, resulting in a rate of natural increase of 7.9 per 1,000. There are 604,400 permanent residents, an increase of 1,500 from 2018, of which, the urban population is 327,100.

=== Ethnicity ===
Reported Ethnicities of Songshan District (2019)
Ethnicity	Population	Percentage
Han Chinese	423,496	69.55%
Mongol	136,487	22.42%
Manchu	44,045	7.23%
Hui	4,015	0.66%
Others	840	0.14%
Total	608,883	100.00%

== Economy ==
Songshan's economy reached a GDP of 27.05 billion yuan in 2019, with its primary sector accounting for 18.0% of GDP, its secondary sector accounting for 22.6% of GDP, and the tertiary sector accounting for 59.4% of GDP.

As of 2019, urban residents had a per capita disposable income of 36,168 yuan, and rural residents had a per capita disposable income of 16,555 yuan. Retail sales in 2019 totaled 15.04 billion yuan.

The area is home to a number of gold mines. Other mineral deposits in Songshan include silver, copper, iron, lead, limestone, coal, fluorite, and perlite.

== Transportation ==
Major roadways which pass through Songshan District include China National Highway 111, China National Highway 305, China National Highway 306, the G16 Dandong–Xilinhot Expressway, and the G45 Daqing–Guangzhou Expressway.

The Beijing–Tongliao railway, Jinzhou-Chifeng railway, and the Chifeng-Shenyang railway (Chinese: 赤沈铁路) pass through Songshan.
