= G4515 Chifeng–Suizhong Expressway =

Road in China

Chifeng–Suizhong Expressway
- 赤峰－绥中高速公路
- Chisui Expressway 赤绥高速公路

Route information
- Auxiliary route of G45

Major junctions
- North end: G45 in Hongshan District, Chifeng, Inner Mongolia
- South end: G1 in Suizhong County, Huludao, Liaoning

Location
- Country: China

Highway system
- National Trunk Highway System; Primary; Auxiliary; National Highways; Transport in China
← G4513	→ G50

The G4515 Chifeng–Suizhong Expressway (Chinese: 赤峰—绥中高速公路), also referred to as the Chisui Expressway (Chinese: 赤绥高速公路), is an under construction expressway in China that connects Chifeng, Inner Mongolia to Suizhong County, Liaoning.

== Route ==
The expressways starts in Hongshan District, Chifeng and travels through Lingyuan, Harqin Zuoyi Mongol Autonomous County and Jianchang County before terminating in Suizhong County, Huludao.
