= List of universities and colleges in Inner Mongolia =

The following is List of Universities and Colleges in Inner Mongolia.

Note: The list is arranged in the default order followed the one provided by MOE

Name	Chinese name	Mongolian transl.	Type	Location	Note
Inner Mongolia University	内蒙古大学		Provincial	Hohhot	Double First Class
Inner Mongolia University of Science and Technology	内蒙古科技大学		Provincial	Baotou	
Inner Mongolia University of Technology	内蒙古工业大学		Provincial	Hohhot	
Inner Mongolia Agricultural University	内蒙古农业大学		Provincial	Hohhot	
Inner Mongolia Medical University	内蒙古医科大学		Provincial	Hohhot	
Baotou Medical College	包头医学院		Provincial	Baotou	
Inner Mongolia Normal University	内蒙古师范大学		Provincial	Hohhot	
Baotou Teachers' College	包头师范学院		Provincial	Baotou	
Inner Mongolia University for Nationalities	内蒙古民族大学		Provincial	Tongliao	
Chifeng University	赤峰学院		Provincial	Chifeng	
Hulunbuir College	呼伦贝尔学院		Provincial	Hulunbuir	
Jining Normal University	集宁师范学院		Provincial	Ulanqab	
Inner Mongolia University of Finance and Economics	内蒙古财经大学		Provincial	Hohhot	
Hetao College	河套学院		Provincial	Bayannur	
Pioneer College, Inner Mongolia University	内蒙古大学创业学院		Private	Hohhot	
Honder College, Inner Mongolia Normal University	内蒙古师范大学鸿德学院		Private	Hohhot	
Inner Mongolia University of Arts	内蒙古艺术学院		Provincial	Hohhot	
Ordos Institute of Technology	鄂尔多斯应用技术学院		Provincial	Ordos	
