= G1611 Hexigten–Chengde Expressway =

Road in China

Hexigten–Chengde Expressway
- 克什克腾－承德高速公路
- Hecheng Expressway 克承高速公路

Route information
- Auxiliary route of G16
- Length: 272.75 km (169.48 mi)

Major junctions
- North end: G16 / S105 in Hexigten Banner, Chifeng, Inner Mongolia
- South end: G45 in Longhua County, Chengde, Hebei

Location
- Country: China

Highway system
- National Trunk Highway System; Primary; Auxiliary; National Highways; Transport in China
← G16	→ G1612

The G1611 Hexigten–Chengde Expressway (Chinese: 克什克腾—承德高速公路), also referred to as the Hecheng Expressway (Chinese: 克承高速公路), is an expressway in China that connects Hexigten Banner, Inner Mongolia to Chengde, Hebei.

== Route ==
=== Inner Mongolia ===
The section in Inner Mongolia has a total length of 96.15 kilometers and was opened to traffic in 2023.

=== Hebei ===
==== Ulanbutong (Inner Mongolia-Hebei border) to Weichang ====
With a total length of 106.36 kilometers, construction started on 5 December 2022, and is expected to be opened to traffic in 2025.

==== Weichang to Chengde ====
The section from Weichang to Chengde, also known as the S50 Chengwei Expressway, has a total length of 70.25 kilometers. Construction started on 21 August 2010 and opened to traffic on 9 December 2013.
