= Heshigten Global Geopark =

Coordinates: 43.247954°N 117.534828°E

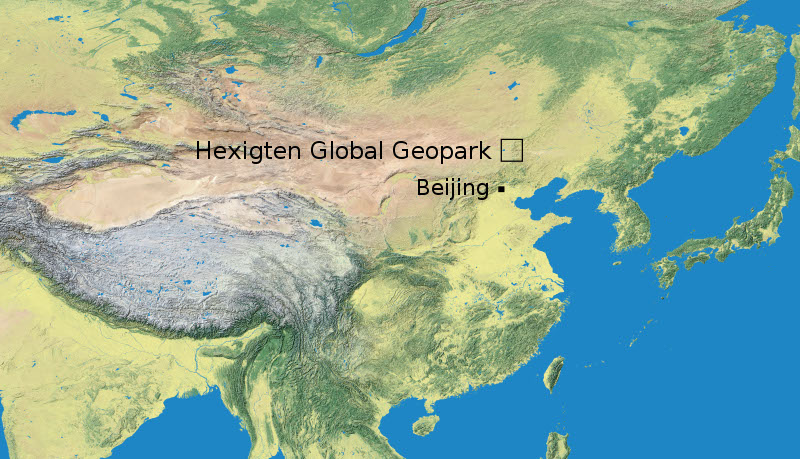
Location of Heshigten Global Geopark in China

Heshigten or Hexigten Global Geopark (Chinese: 克什克腾世界地质公园, kè shí kè téng shì jiè dì zhì gōng yuán) is a UNESCO Global Geopark in Hexigten Banner, Chifeng city, Inner Mongolia, China. Its 1,750 km^{2} area is contained in eight separate areas of scenic beauty and geologic significance, including volcanic, glacial, and desert features.

The park was designated a National Geopark of China by the Ministry of Land and Resources on December 10, 2001, and as a World Geopark by UNESCO on February 11, 2005.

== Geography ==
The park is situated in Heshigten Banner, 210 km northwest of the urban area of Chifeng City and 400 km north of Beijing, capital of China. It lies at the convergence of several geographic regions: the Greater Khingan Mountains to the east, the Yan Mountains to the south, and the Hunshandake Sandland to the southwest. The collision belt of the North China Platform and the Xingmeng Geosyncline also runs through Hexigten. The eight park areas are scattered throughout the area, sampling glacial, volcanic, desert, and hydrological land forms of scenic beauty and geological significance. Altogether, the park covers 1,750 km^{2} out of Hexigten Banner's total area of 20,673 km^{2}.

== Park areas ==
=== Arshihaty granite forest ===
The Arshihaty granite forest (阿斯哈图花岗岩石林, from Mongolian "steep peaks") in northern Hexigten Banner is a "forest" of stone columns created by frost splitting, freezing and thawing cycles, and erosion by wind. The granite columns are unusual in their strong horizontal segmentation. Five scenic areas in the granite forest are nicknamed the moon castle (月亮城堡), sworn brothers (桃园结义), eagle with folded wings (雄鹰敛翅), fortress besieged (围城), and live folk entertainment (民俗生活娱乐).

=== Qingshan granite mortars ===
The Qingshan granite mortars area (青山岩臼群是) is a landscape of glacial potholes similar to giant's kettles. These are round pits in the rock, formed by whirlpool-like swirling water during the Quaternary period. The two-square-kilometer area contains over 300 potholes ranging in size from 50 cm to a few meters, with shapes resembling pots, jars, spoons, buckets, and basins.

=== Dali Nur volcanic landscape ===
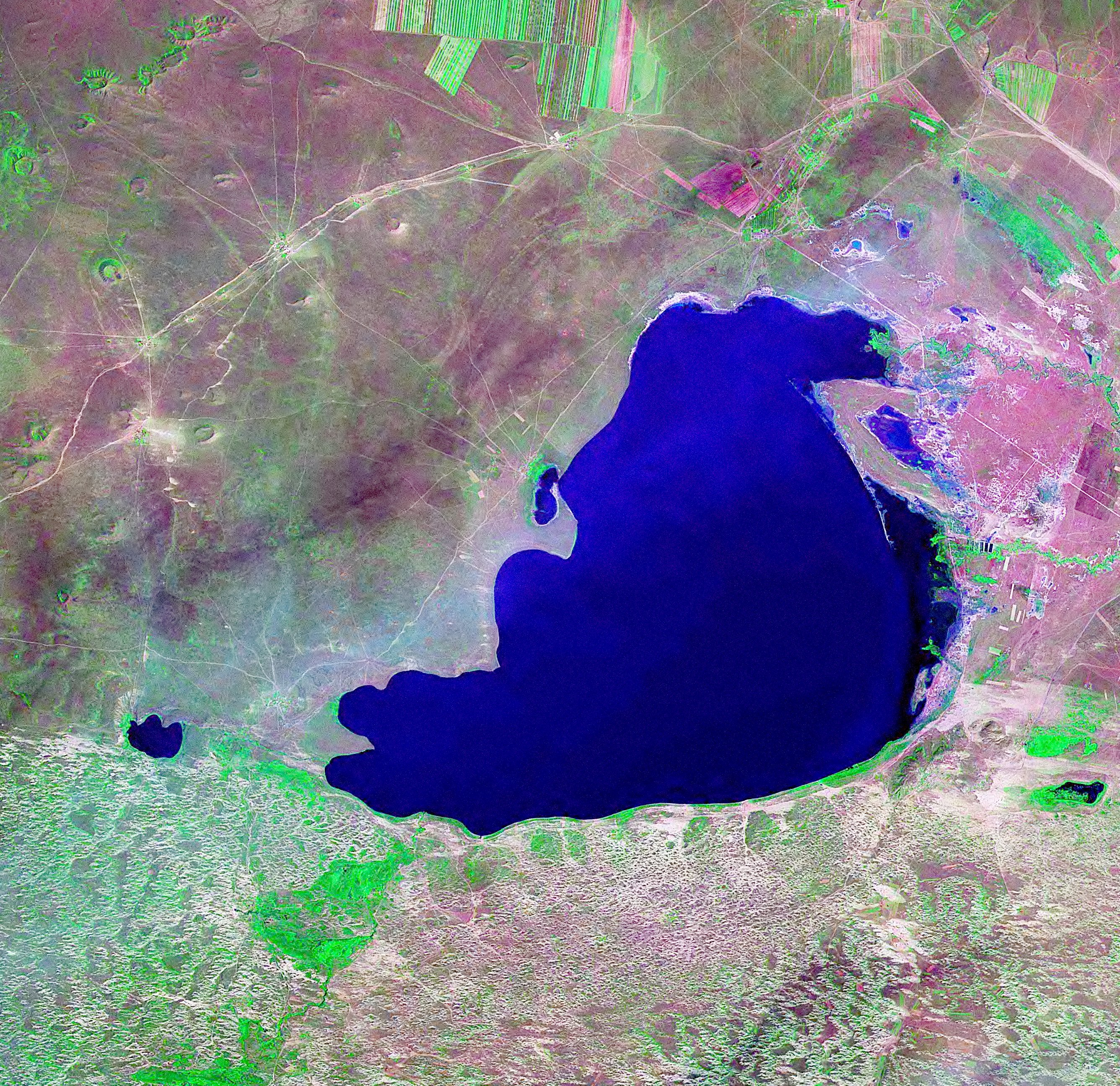
Dali Nur lake, with craters in the volcanic area to the northwest. Hunshandak Sandland is to the south of the lake. NASA Landsat imagery.

Dali Nur (Chinese 达里诺尔 or 达来诺尔) is a lake in the western part of Hexigten Banner, with several park areas near its shores. The Dali Nur volcanic group (达里诺尔火山群) lies on the northwest shore. Volcanic features include a basalt plateau and the large "plugs" of extinct volcanos, which once formed islands in the lake when water levels were higher. The plugs are now isolated hills.

=== Huanggangliang Quaternary glacial remnant ===
Mount Huanggangliang is the highest peak in the Greater Khingan mountain range, with a peak at 2029 m. Above 1500–1700 m there are "island-like" permafrost areas, remaining from the last glaciation.

=== Reshuitang thermal springs ===
The park includes a mineral hot spring bath area at Reshuitang (热水塘) in the eastern part of Hexigten.

=== Pingdingshan scenic Quaternary cirque group ===
The Pingdingshan (平顶山) glacial cirques are remnants of the Quaternary, in the southeast part of Hexigten Banner. The existence of cirques and other Quaternary glacial features in Hexigten are importance evidence of the glacial history of northern China.

=== Xilamulun River canyon ===
The Xar Moron River (西拉沐沦河, Xilamulun) flows to the northeast through Hexigten Banner. The vicinity of the Xar Moron was the original homeland of the Khitan people. In the southwest of Hexigten, the river forms a deep "grand canyon" which is included as one of the park areas.

=== Hunshandak sand land ===
Hunshandake Sandland (混善达克沙地) is one of the four largest sand lands in China, covering an area of 53,000 km^{2}. It is an ecologically sensitive region, undergoing rapid desertification because of overgrazing: from the 1960s to 2000, the fraction of Hunshandake occupied by sand dunes increased from 2% to 33%.

The sandland park area with its dunes is located in the part of Hunshandake on the south shore of Dali Nur.

== See also ==
- National Geoparks of China
