= Songshan District =

Songshan District may refer to:

- Songshan District, Chifeng (松山区)
- Songshan District, Taipei (松山區)
