= Dangpudi Manchu Ethnic Township =

Dangpudi Manchu Ethnic Township 当铺地满族乡 ᡩᠠᠩ ᡦᡠ᠋ ᡩᡳ ᠮᠠᠨᠵᡠ ᡠᡴᠰᡠᡵᠠᡳ ᡤᠠᡧᠠᠨ
- Ethnic township
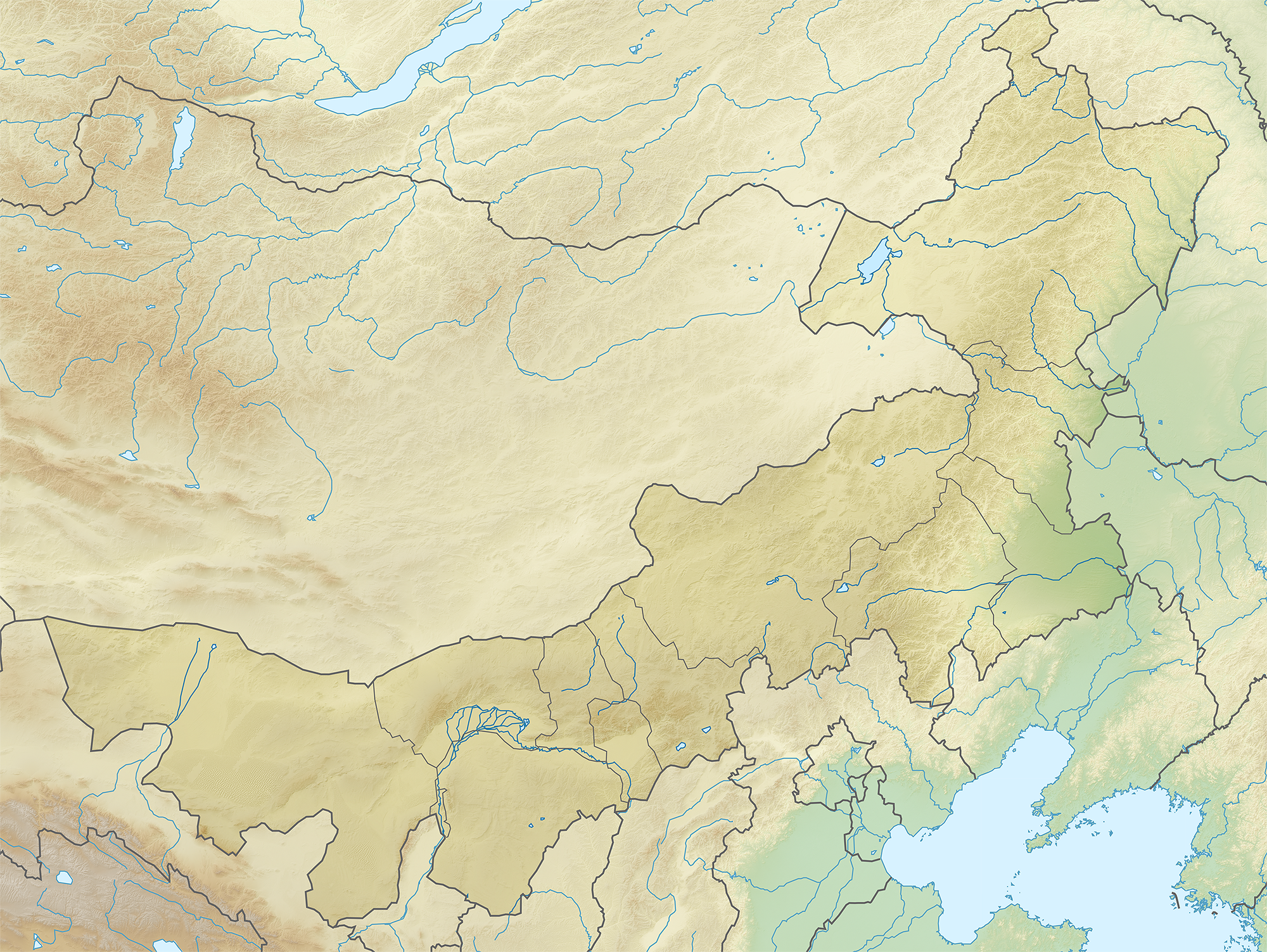
- Location in Inner Mongolia
- Coordinates: 42°21′06″N 118°52′48″E
- Country: People's Republic of China
- Autonomous region: Inner Mongolia
- Prefecture-level city: Chifeng
- District: Songshan

Area
  - Total: 386 km^{2} (149 sq mi)

Population (2018)
  - Total: 41,822
  - Density: 108/km^{2} (281/sq mi)
- Time zone: UTC+8 (China Standard)

Dangpudi Manchu Ethnic Township (simplified Chinese: 当铺地满族乡; traditional Chinese: 當鋪地滿族鄉; pinyin: Dāngpūdì Mǎnzú Xiāng) Manchu: ᡩᠠᠩ
ᡦᡠ᠋
ᡩᡳ
ᠮᠠᠨᠵᡠ
ᡠᡴᠰᡠᡵᠠᡳ
ᡤᠠᡧᠠᠨ, Möllendorff romanization: dang pu di manju uksurai gašan) is an ethnic township located in the Songshan District of Chifeng, Inner Mongolia. The ethnic township contains a large ethnically Manchu population, spans an area of 386 square kilometres (149 mi^{2}), and has a hukou population of 41,822 as of 2018.

== Administrative divisions ==
Dangpudi is divided into the following village-level divisions:

- Xinjing Village (Chinese: 新井村)
- Dangpudi Village (Chinese: 当铺地村)
- Daxinglongzhuang Village (Chinese: 大兴隆庄村)
- Xiaoxinglongzhuang Village (Chinese: 小兴隆庄村)
- Xinglongwa Village (Chinese: 兴隆洼村)
- Beidao Village (Chinese: 北道村)
- Guanjiaying Village (Chinese: 关家营村)
- Majiazi Village (Chinese: 马架子村)
- Wangjiayingzi Village (Chinese: 王家营子村)
- Xindian Village (Chinese: 新店村)
- Halahaigou Village (Chinese: 哈拉海沟村)
- Nianzigou Village (Chinese: 碾子沟村)
- Hajingou Village (Chinese: 哈金沟村)
- Shijiezhuang Village (Chinese: 石界庄村)
- Liujiagou Village (Chinese: 柳家沟村)
- Damutougou Village (Chinese: 大木头沟村)
- Nanpingfang Village (Chinese: 南平房村)
- Hashitu Village (Chinese: 哈什吐村)
- Shijianggou Village (Chinese: 石匠沟村)
- Xiaomutougou Village (Chinese: 小木头沟村)
- Jiaojiayingzi Village (Chinese: 焦家营子村)
- Sanjia Village (Chinese: 三家村)
- Sidaogouliang Village (Chinese: 四道沟梁村)
- Longwangmiao Village (Chinese: 龙王庙村)
- Zhalanfen Village (Chinese: 扎兰坟村)

== Demographics ==
As of 2018, the ethnic township has a hukou population of 41,822. As of 2012, the ethnic township was home to approximately 42,000 people, comprising 9,854 households. Of the ethnic township's population, 6,019 people, or approximately 14% of the population, were ethnically Manchu as of 2012.

== Economy ==
As of 2015, the ethnic township had a gross domestic product (GDP) of 1.46 billion yuan, and 70.466 million yuan of fiscal revenue. The ethnic township's rural population has an annual disposable income averaging 11,057 yuan.

Dangpudi's local economy is dominated by the agricultural sector, which employs about 12,000 workers. Major agricultural products of the ethnic township include fruits, vegetables, pork, beef, and donkey meat.

The ethnic township also attracts rural tourism, and mining of minerals such as molybdenum is also present in Dangpudi.

=== Poverty alleviation ===
During the mid-2010's, the government of Inner Mongolia launched a program to improve living conditions within the county. This program involved renovating homes which were deemed "dangerous", paving many previously unpaved roads, expanding safe drinking water infrastructure, improving health infrastructure, expanding the ethnic township's cultural facilities, and improving the ethnic township's supermarkets among other activities.

== See also ==
- Manchu people
- Songshan District
