= Xiangyang Subdistrict, Chifeng =

Xiangyang Subdistrict 向阳街道 ᠰᠢᠶᠠᠩ ᠶᠠᠩ ᠵᠡᠭᠡᠯᠢ ᠭᠤᠳᠤᠮᠵᠢ
- Subdistrict
- Location in Inner Mongolia
- Coordinates: 42°17′3″N 118°56′7″E
- Country: People's Republic of China
- Autonomous region: Inner Mongolia
- Prefecture-level city: Chifeng
- District: Songshan District
- Time zone: UTC+8 (China Standard)

Xiangyang Subdistrict (Chinese: 向阳街道; pinyin: Xiàngyáng Jiēdào) Šijan jan zeel gudamž (Mongolian: ᠰᠢᠶᠠᠩ
ᠶᠠᠩ
ᠵᠡᠭᠡᠯᠢ
ᠭᠤᠳᠤᠮᠵᠢ; Шиян ян зээл гудамж) is a subdistrict in Songshan District, Chifeng, Inner Mongolia, China. As of 2018, it has 9 residential communities under its administration.

== See also ==
- List of township-level divisions of Inner Mongolia
