= China National Highway 305 =

Road in China

National Highway 305
- 305国道

Route information
- Length: 815 km (506 mi)

Major junctions
- From: Zhuanghe, Liaoning
- To: Linxi, Inner Mongolia

Location
- Country: China

Highway system
- National Trunk Highway System; Primary; Auxiliary
← G304	→ G306

China National Highway 305 (G305) runs northwest from Zhuanghe, Liaoning towards Linxi, Inner Mongolia. It is 815 kilometres in length.

== Route and distance ==
Route and distance

City	Distance (km)
Zhuanghe, Liaoning	0
Gaizhou, Liaoning	122
Yingkou, Liaoning	162
Dawa County, Liaoning	202
Panjin, Liaoning	225
Beipiao, Liaoning	437
Aohan Banner, Inner Mongolia	556
Haladaokou, Inner Mongolia	606
Ongniud Banner, Inner Mongolia	671
Linxi, Inner Mongolia	815

== See also ==
- China National Highways
- China Highways
- China National Highway 318 (China National Highway 318 (G318) runs from Shanghai to Zhangmu on the China-Nepal border)
