= Chifeng Petroglyphs =

Images carved into rocks in Inner Mongolia, China

- Periods: Neolithic
- Location: Chifeng, Inner Mongolia

Site notes
- Discovered: 1980s

The Chifeng Petroglyphs (simplified Chinese: 赤峰岩画; traditional Chinese: 赤峰岩畫; pinyin: Chìfēng Yánhuà), also known as Chifeng Rock Art, are images carved into the rocks of Chifeng, Inner Mongolia. These petroglyphs were carved by the nomads of ancient northern China.

Chifeng Rock Art, dating back to 8000 to 7000 years ago, is an important part of the rock painting system in Inner Mongolia and even in northern China. The petroglyphs located here are dominated by human faces and animals, with human faces prominently represented by the eyes, followed by the mouth and nose, and then by the ears.

== Discovery and research ==
Chifeng Petroglyphs have been discovered one after another since the 1980s. The petroglyphs here are characterized by a long history, a wide variety of categories and exquisite techniques, and they occupy an important position in the world rock painting system.
