= Huangdi, Liaoning =

Huangdi 荒地镇
- Town
- Location in Liaoning
- Coordinates: 40°13′52″N 120°16′2″E
- Country: People's Republic of China
- Province: Liaoning
- Prefecture-level city: Huludao
- County: Suizhong County
- Time zone: UTC+8 (China Standard)

Huangdi (Chinese: 荒地; pinyin: Huāngdì) is a town under the administration of Suizhong County, Liaoning, China. As of 2020, it administers the following twelve villages:

- Donghuangdi Village (东荒地村)
- Xihuangdi Village (西荒地村)
- Sangyuan Village (桑园村)
- Yulin Village (榆林村)
- Xili Village (西李村)
- Dazheng Village (大郑村)
- Shangjia Village (尚家村)
- Niuxintun Village (牛心屯村)
- Shuanke Village (拴科村)
- Sunxiang Village (孙相村)
- Xitaitun Village (西台屯村)
- Yangbaotun Village (杨保屯村)
