= Chifeng University =

University in Chifeng, China

Chifeng University (Chinese: 赤峰学院) is a public university formed by the combination of Chifeng Normal College of Nationalities and other four academies. It was approved by the Ministry of Education of the People's Republic of China in 2003. It is in the city of Chifeng, the birthplace of the Hong Shan cultures. (The city has scenic spots and is a tourist destination.) The university has 24 colleges or departments.

== Schools and departments ==
- Medical College (M.B.B.S/B.D.S recognized by IMED)
- Mongolian Literature and History Institute
- College of Liberal Arts
- College of Foreign Languages
- University Ministry of Foreign Language Teaching
- Academy of Music
- Academy of Fine Arts
- Politics and Law Institute
- Economics and Management
- History and Culture
- School of Education Science
- Institute of Physical Education
- School of Mathematics and Statistics
- Resources and Environmental Sciences
- Physics and Electronics and Information Engineering
- Computer and Information Engineering
- Chemistry and Chemical Engineering
- School of Life Sciences
- Elementary Education
- College of Architecture and Mechanical Engineering
- Department of Social Sciences
- College of Adult Education

== Chifeng University Medical College ==
The Zhaowuda Union Health School founded in 1958 is the predecessor of the Chifeng University Medical College (CUMC). In July 1962 it changed its name to Inner Mongolia Chifeng Health Schools. In 1966 the school moved to new premises. After half a century of development and training thousands of graduates in April 2003 the school merged with Chifeng University and become CUMC.

The medical college has 1793 undergraduate and junior college students. It has 642 professional and technical people, 139 full-time teachers including 104 undergraduate degree, 17 master's degree, 1 doctor, and 2 PhD, and 9 part-time professors.

=== Departments ===
- Department of Basic and Clinical Medicine (M.B.B.S)
- Department of Oral Medicine (B.D.S)
- Department of Medicine
- Department of Nursing
- Department of Traditional Chinese Medicine

==== M.B.B.S ====
Bachelor of Medicine Bachelor of Surgery

- Duration: 5 Years (4 Years Study + 1 Year Internship)
- Course: Human Anatomy, histology, embryology, biochemistry, physiology, pathology, pharmacology, diagnostics, preventive medicine,

internal medicine, surgery, obstetrics and gynecology, pediatrics, medical psychology, medical ethics

==== B.D.S ====
Bachelor of Dental Surgery

- Duration: 5 Years (4 Years Study + 1 Year Internship)
- Courses: Anatomy, physiology, biochemistry, pathology, medical microbiology, diagnostics, internal medicine, surgery, oral anatomy

and physiology, oral tissue pathology, oral medicine (dental endodontics, dental diseases), Oral and Maxillofacial Surgery, Prosthodontics, Orthodontics

=== Affiliated hospitals ===
Chifeng University Medical College has 2 affiliated hospitals, 8 teaching hospitals and 3 pharmaceutical companies as a teaching and practice base, fully able to meet the professional, clinical teaching at all levels of students and trainees, practice requirements.

==== First Affiliated Hospital ====
First Affiliated Hospital is a III B hospital, established in 1980, having 1000 beds with first class facilities of cardiac surgery, brain surgery, the general surgery, orthopedics and other difficult surgery in the autonomous region.

==== Second Affiliated Hospital ====
Second Affiliated Hospital has 400 beds, consists of 25 clinical and medical departments with 113 professional and technical personnel having facilities of CT, X-ray machines, C-arm and other large equipment.

== Facilities ==
=== Classrooms ===
In the university, many modern teaching and research facilities have been set up, such as the experiment center, the computer center, the multimedia classrooms, the aural-oral labs and the computer network.

=== Laboratory ===
Medical laboratory building construction area is 16,087 square meters including 49 laboratories. These laboratories are four time funded by the Hong Kong Chinese Foundation and WHO.

=== Dorms ===
There are separate dorms for boys and girls. The dorms provided by the university to international students are two or four person-rooms with an attached bathroom, bed, furniture, free hot drinking water, heater, internet access, and public laundry.

== International co-operation ==
The university insists in running the school in an open manner, enhancing the communication and the cooperation with outside, setting up the favorable cooperating relationship with the related institutions of other countries.

- United States
- United Kingdom
- Germany
- France
- Canada
- Japan
- South Korea
- Pakistan
- Mongolia

Further, the university has appointed many foreign professors to participate in teaching, thereby enhancing and improving the foreign language teaching level.

The teaching principle is to base itself upon the local area, face the whole region, cover the vicinity, to train the application-type and skill-type high-level special persons for the local economy construction and the social development. The object is to build into an all-around university incorporating the common higher education, the adult education and the higher vocational education.
