= China National Highway 306 =

Road in China

National Highway 306
- 306国道

Route information
- Length: 497 km (309 mi)

Major junctions
- From: Suizhong, Liaoning
- To: Hexigten Qi, Inner Mongolia

Location
- Country: China

Highway system
- National Trunk Highway System; Primary; Auxiliary
← G305	→ G307

China National Highway 306 (G306) runs northwest from Suizhong, Liaoning towards Hexigten Qi, Inner Mongolia and spans 497 kilometres.

== Route and distance ==
Route and distance

City	Distance (km)
Suizhong, Liaoning	0
Jianchang, Liaoning	88
Lingyuan, Liaoning	157
Harqin Banner, Inner Mongolia	257
Hexigten Qi, Inner Mongolia	497

== See also ==
- China National Highways
