= Yuanbaoshan District =

Yuanbaoshan 元宝山区 • ᠶᠤᠸᠠᠨ ᠪᠣᠣ ᠱᠠᠨ ᠲᠣᠭᠣᠷᠢᠭ
- District
- Location within Inner Mongolia Location within China
- Coordinates: 42°02′20″N 119°17′19″E
- Country: China
- Autonomous region: Inner Mongolia
- Prefecture-level city: Chifeng
- District seat: Pingzhuang

Area
  - Total: 943.9 km^{2} (364.4 sq mi)
- Elevation: 512 m (1,680 ft)

Population (2020)
  - Total: 284,990
  - Density: 301.9/km^{2} (782.0/sq mi)
- Time zone: UTC+8 (China Standard)
- Website: www.ybs.gov.cn

Yuanbaoshan District

Chinese name
- Simplified Chinese: 元宝山区
- Traditional Chinese: 元寶山區
Transcriptions
Standard Mandarin
- Hanyu Pinyin: Yuánbǎoshān Qū

Mongolian name
- Mongolian Cyrillic: Юан буу шин дугараг
- Mongolian script: ᠶᠤᠸᠠᠨ ᠪᠣᠣ ᠱᠠᠨ ᠲᠣᠭᠣᠷᠢᠭ
Transcriptions
- SASM/GNC: Yuvan boo šan toɣoriɣ

Yuanbaoshan District (Mongolian: ᠶᠤᠸᠠᠨ ᠪᠣᠣ ᠱᠠᠨ ᠲᠣᠭᠣᠷᠢᠭ; Chinese: 元宝山区) is a district of the city of Chifeng, Inner Mongolia, China.

== Administrative divisions ==
Yuanbaoshan District is made up of 6 subdistricts, 5 towns, 1 ethnic township.

Name	Simplified Chinese	Hanyu Pinyin	Mongolian (Hudum Script)	Mongolian (Cyrillic)	Administrative division code
Subdistricts
Xilutian Subdistrict	西露天街道	Xīlùtiān Jiēdào	ᠰᠢ ᠯᠤ ᠲᠢᠶᠠᠨ ᠵᠡᠭᠡᠯᠢ ᠭᠤᠳᠤᠮᠵᠢ	Ший лөө даяан зээл гудамж	150403001
Pingzhuang Chengqu Subdistrict	平庄城区街道	Píngzhuāng Chéngqū Jiēdào	ᠫᠢᠩᠵᠤᠸᠠᠩ ᠬᠣᠲᠠ ᠶᠢᠨ ᠲᠣᠭᠣᠷᠢᠭ ᠤᠨ ᠵᠡᠭᠡᠯᠢ ᠭᠤᠳᠤᠮᠵᠢ	Пинзован хотын дугаргийн зээл гудамж	150403002
Pingzhuang Dongcheng Subdistrict	平庄东城街道	Píngzhuāng Dōngchéng Jiēdào	ᠫᠢᠩᠵᠤᠸᠠᠩ ᠤᠨ ᠵᠡᠭᠦᠨ ᠬᠣᠲᠠ ᠶᠢᠨ ᠵᠡᠭᠡᠯᠢ ᠭᠤᠳᠤᠮᠵᠢ	Пинзованийн зүүн хотын зээл гудамж	150403003
Pingzhuang Xicheng Subdistrict	平庄西城街道	Píngzhuāng Xīchéng Jiēdào	ᠫᠢᠩᠵᠤᠸᠠᠩ ᠪᠠᠷᠠᠭᠤᠨ ᠬᠣᠲᠠ ᠶᠢᠨ ᠵᠡᠭᠡᠯᠢ ᠭᠤᠳᠤᠮᠵᠢ	Пинзован баруун хотын зээл гудамж	150403004
Malin Subdistrict	马林街道	Mǎlín Jiēdào	ᠮᠠ ᠯᠢᠨ ᠵᠡᠭᠡᠯᠢ ᠭᠤᠳᠤᠮᠵᠢ	Ма лин зээл гудамж	150403005
Yunshan Road Subdistrict	云杉路街道	Yúnshānlù Jiēdào	ᠶᠦᠨ ᠱᠠᠨ ᠵᠠᠮ ᠤᠨ ᠵᠡᠭᠡᠯᠢ ᠭᠤᠳᠤᠮᠵᠢ	Ен шин замын зээл гудамж	150403006
Towns
Fengshuigou Town	风水沟镇	Fēngshuǐgōu Zhèn	ᠹᠧᠩ ᠱᠦᠢ ᠭᠧᠦ ᠪᠠᠯᠭᠠᠰᠤ	Фен шүй гүү балгас	150403100
Yuanbaoshan Town	元宝山镇	Yuánbǎoshān Zhèn	ᠶᠤᠸᠠᠨ ᠪᠣᠣ ᠱᠠᠨ ᠪᠠᠯᠭᠠᠰᠤ	Юан буу шин балгас	150403101
Meilihe Town	美丽河镇	Měilìhé Zhèn	ᠮᠡᠢᠷᠡᠨ ᠭᠣᠣᠯ ᠪᠠᠯᠭᠠᠰᠤ	Мэйрэн гол балгас	150403102
Pingzhuang Town	平庄镇	Píngzhuāng Zhèn	ᠫᠢᠩᠵᠤᠸᠠᠩ ᠪᠠᠯᠭᠠᠰᠤ	Пинзован балгас	150403103
Wujia Town	五家镇	Wǔjiā Zhèn	ᠡᠦ ᠵᠢᠶᠠ ᠪᠠᠯᠭᠠᠰᠤ	Үү жье балгас	150403104
Ethnic township
Xiaowujia Township (Xiaowujia Hui Ethnic Township)	小五家乡 (小五家回族乡)	Xiǎowǔjiā Xiāng (Xiǎowǔjiā Húizú Xiāng)	ᠰᠢᠶᠣᠤ ᠡᠦ ᠵᠢᠶᠠ ᠰᠢᠶᠠᠩ	Шяо үү жье шиян	150403200
