= Linxi County, Inner Mongolia =

Linxi County 林西县 • ᠯᠢᠨᠰᠢ ᠰᠢᠶᠠᠨ Lin-hsi
- County
- Location in Inner Mongolia Linxi (China)
- Coordinates: 43°37′N 118°04′E
- Country: China
- Autonomous region: Inner Mongolia
- Prefecture-level city: Chifeng
- County seat: Linxi Town

Area
  - Total: 3,621 km^{2} (1,398 sq mi)
- Elevation: 805 m (2,641 ft)

Population (2020)
  - Total: 186,663
  - Density: 51.55/km^{2} (133.5/sq mi)
- Time zone: UTC+8 (China Standard)
- Website: www.linxixian.gov.cn

Linxi County, Inner Mongolia

Chinese name
- Simplified Chinese: 林西县
- Traditional Chinese: 林西縣
Transcriptions
Standard Mandarin
- Hanyu Pinyin: Línxī Xiàn

Mongolian name
- Mongolian Cyrillic: Линш шиан
- Mongolian script: ᠯᠢᠨᠰᠢ ᠰᠢᠶᠠᠨ
Transcriptions
- SASM/GNC: Linsi siyan

Linxi County (Mongolian: ᠯᠢᠨᠰᠢ ᠰᠢᠶᠠᠨ; Chinese: 林西县) is a county of eastern Inner Mongolia, China. It is under the administration of Chifeng City, 165 kilometres (103 mi) to the south-southeast.

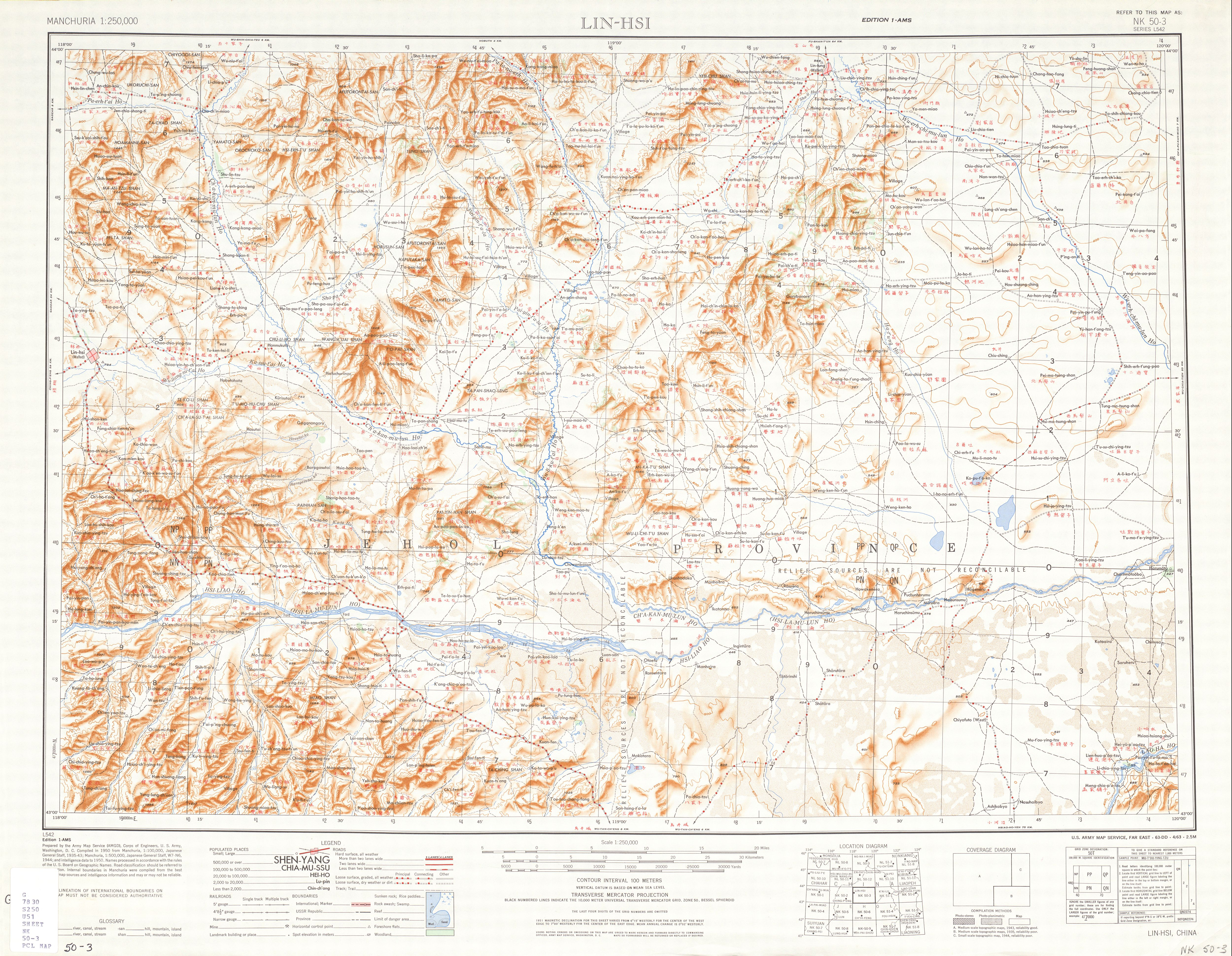
Map including Linxi (labeled as 林西 Lin-hsi (Walled)) (AMS, 1950)

== Administrative divisions ==
Linxi County is made up of 2 subdistricts, 7 towns and 2 townships.

Name	Simplified Chinese	Hanyu Pinyin	Mongolian (Hudum Script)	Mongolian (Cyrillic)	Administrative division code
Subdistricts
Chengbei Subdistrict	城北街道	Chéngběi Jiēdào	ᠬᠣᠲᠠ ᠶᠢᠨ ᠬᠣᠢᠨ᠎ᠠ ᠵᠡᠭᠡᠯᠢ ᠭᠤᠳᠤᠮᠵᠢ	Хотын хойно зээл гудамж	150424400
Chengnan Subdistrict	城南街道	Chéngnán Jiēdào	ᠬᠣᠲᠠ ᠶᠢᠨ ᠡᠮᠦᠨᠡᠬᠢ ᠵᠡᠭᠡᠯᠢ ᠭᠤᠳᠤᠮᠵᠢ	Хотын өмнөх зээл гудамж	150424401
Towns
Linxi Town	林西镇	Línxī Zhèn	ᠯᠢᠨᠰᠢ ᠪᠠᠯᠭᠠᠰᠤ	Линш балгас	150424100
Xinchengzi Town	新城子镇	Xīnchéngzi Zhèn	ᠰᠢᠨ ᠴᠧᠩᠽᠢ ᠪᠠᠯᠭᠠᠰᠤ	Шин цэнз балгас	150424101
Xinlin Town	新林镇	Xīnlín Zhèn	ᠰᠢᠨ ᠯᠢᠨ ᠪᠠᠯᠭᠠᠰᠤ	Шин лин балгас	150424102
Wushijiazi Town (Tabin Ger Town)	五十家子镇	Wǔshíjiāzi Zhèn	ᠲᠠᠪᠢᠨ ᠭᠡᠷ ᠪᠠᠯᠭᠠᠰᠤ	Тавин гэр балгас	150424103
Guandi Town	官地镇	Guāndì Zhèn	ᠭᠤᠸᠠᠨ ᠳ᠋ᠢ ᠪᠠᠯᠭᠠᠰᠤ	Гуан ди балгас	150424104
Dajing Town	大井镇	Dàjǐng Zhèn	ᠳ᠋ᠠ ᠵᠢᠩ ᠪᠠᠯᠭᠠᠰᠤ	Да жин балгас	150424105
Tongbu Town	统部镇	Tǒngbù Zhèn	ᠲᠦᠩ ᠪᠦ᠋ ᠪᠠᠯᠭᠠᠰᠤ	Дүн бүү балгас	150424106
Townships
Dayingzi Township	大营子乡	Dàyíngzi Xiāng	ᠳ᠋ᠠ ᠶᠢᠩᠽᠢ ᠰᠢᠶᠠᠩ	Да енз шиян	150424200
Xert Township	十二吐乡	Shí'èrtǔ Xiāng	ᠱᠡᠭᠡᠷᠲᠦ ᠰᠢᠶᠠᠩ	Шгэрт шиян	150424201

Other: Inner Mongolia Linxi Industrial Park (内蒙古林西工业园区)

== Climate ==
Linxi County has a dry, monsoon-influenced humid continental climate (Köppen Dwb), with very cold and dry winters, hot, somewhat humid summers, and strong winds, especially in spring. The monthly 24-hour average temperature ranges from −13.6 °C (7.5 °F) in January to 21.6 °C (70.9 °F) in July, with the annual mean at 5.17 °C (41.3 °F). The annual precipitation is about 370 millimetres (14.6 in), with more than half of it falling in July and August alone. With monthly percent possible sunshine ranging from 54% in July to 74% in February, sunshine is abundant year-round, there are 2,949 hours of bright sunshine annually.

Climate data for Linxi County, elevation 825 m (2,707 ft), (1991–2020 normals, extremes 1951–present)
Month	Jan	Feb	Mar	Apr	May	Jun	Jul	Aug	Sep	Oct	Nov	Dec	Year
Record high °C (°F)	7.5 (45.5)	16.1 (61.0)	24.8 (76.6)	34.0 (93.2)	36.2 (97.2)	38.9 (102.0)	40.4 (104.7)	37.1 (98.8)	35.0 (95.0)	28.6 (83.5)	22.0 (71.6)	12.6 (54.7)	40.4 (104.7)
Mean daily maximum °C (°F)	−6.9 (19.6)	−2.5 (27.5)	4.7 (40.5)	14.4 (57.9)	21.9 (71.4)	26.0 (78.8)	28.1 (82.6)	26.8 (80.2)	21.8 (71.2)	13.3 (55.9)	2.2 (36.0)	−5.5 (22.1)	12.0 (53.6)
Daily mean °C (°F)	−13.5 (7.7)	−9.7 (14.5)	−2.1 (28.2)	7.4 (45.3)	15.0 (59.0)	19.6 (67.3)	22.1 (71.8)	20.3 (68.5)	14.3 (57.7)	6.0 (42.8)	−4.3 (24.3)	−11.6 (11.1)	5.3 (41.5)
Mean daily minimum °C (°F)	−19.1 (−2.4)	−15.9 (3.4)	−8.7 (16.3)	0.1 (32.2)	7.6 (45.7)	12.9 (55.2)	16.1 (61.0)	14.0 (57.2)	7.2 (45.0)	−0.4 (31.3)	−9.6 (14.7)	−16.9 (1.6)	−1.1 (30.1)
Record low °C (°F)	−33.1 (−27.6)	−29.1 (−20.4)	−27.2 (−17.0)	−12.5 (9.5)	−4.4 (24.1)	2.5 (36.5)	6.7 (44.1)	5.8 (42.4)	−4.2 (24.4)	−13.4 (7.9)	−25.3 (−13.5)	−29.6 (−21.3)	−33.1 (−27.6)
Average precipitation mm (inches)	0.7 (0.03)	1.6 (0.06)	5.4 (0.21)	12.8 (0.50)	33.7 (1.33)	78.5 (3.09)	101.7 (4.00)	75.7 (2.98)	30.3 (1.19)	14.9 (0.59)	5.2 (0.20)	1.6 (0.06)	362.1 (14.24)
Average precipitation days (≥ 0.1 mm)	1.1	1.9	3.3	4.1	7.4	12.4	14.4	10.6	7.8	4.6	2.7	1.7	72
Average snowy days	2.3	3.1	5.5	3.3	0.3	0	0	0	0.1	2.5	3.9	2.9	23.9
Average relative humidity (%)	48	43	40	35	38	53	64	64	55	47	49	50	49
Mean monthly sunshine hours	212.7	219.7	268.0	271.6	287.2	261.4	256.7	271.9	254.4	244.2	204.1	198.0	2,949.9
Percentage possible sunshine	73	74	72	67	63	57	55	64	69	73	71	72	68
Source: China Meteorological Administration all-time extreme temperature
