= G16 Dandong–Xilinhot Expressway =

Road in China

Dandong–Xilinhot Expressway
- 丹东－锡林浩特高速公路
- Danxi Expressway 丹锡高速公路

Route information
- Length: 960 km (600 mi) Length when complete.

Major junctions
- East end: G11 in Donggang, Dandong, Liaoning
- West end: Xilinhot, Inner Mongolia (when complete); G303 in Baarin Right Banner, Chifeng, Inner Mongolia (current)

Location
- Country: China

Highway system
- National Trunk Highway System; Primary; Auxiliary; National Highways; Transport in China
← G1536	→ G1611

The Dandong–Xilinhot Expressway (Chinese: 丹东—锡林浩特高速公路), designated as G16 and commonly referred to as the Danxi Expressway (Chinese: 丹锡高速公路) is an expressway that connects the cities of Dandong, Liaoning, China, and Xilinhot, Inner Mongolia. When fully complete, it will be 960 km (600 mi) in length.

Currently, the expressway is complete between Dandong and Baarin Right Banner.
