= Hexigten Banner =

Hexigten Banner 克什克腾旗 • ᠬᠡᠰᠢᠭᠲᠡᠨ ᠬᠣᠰᠢᠭᠤ
- County
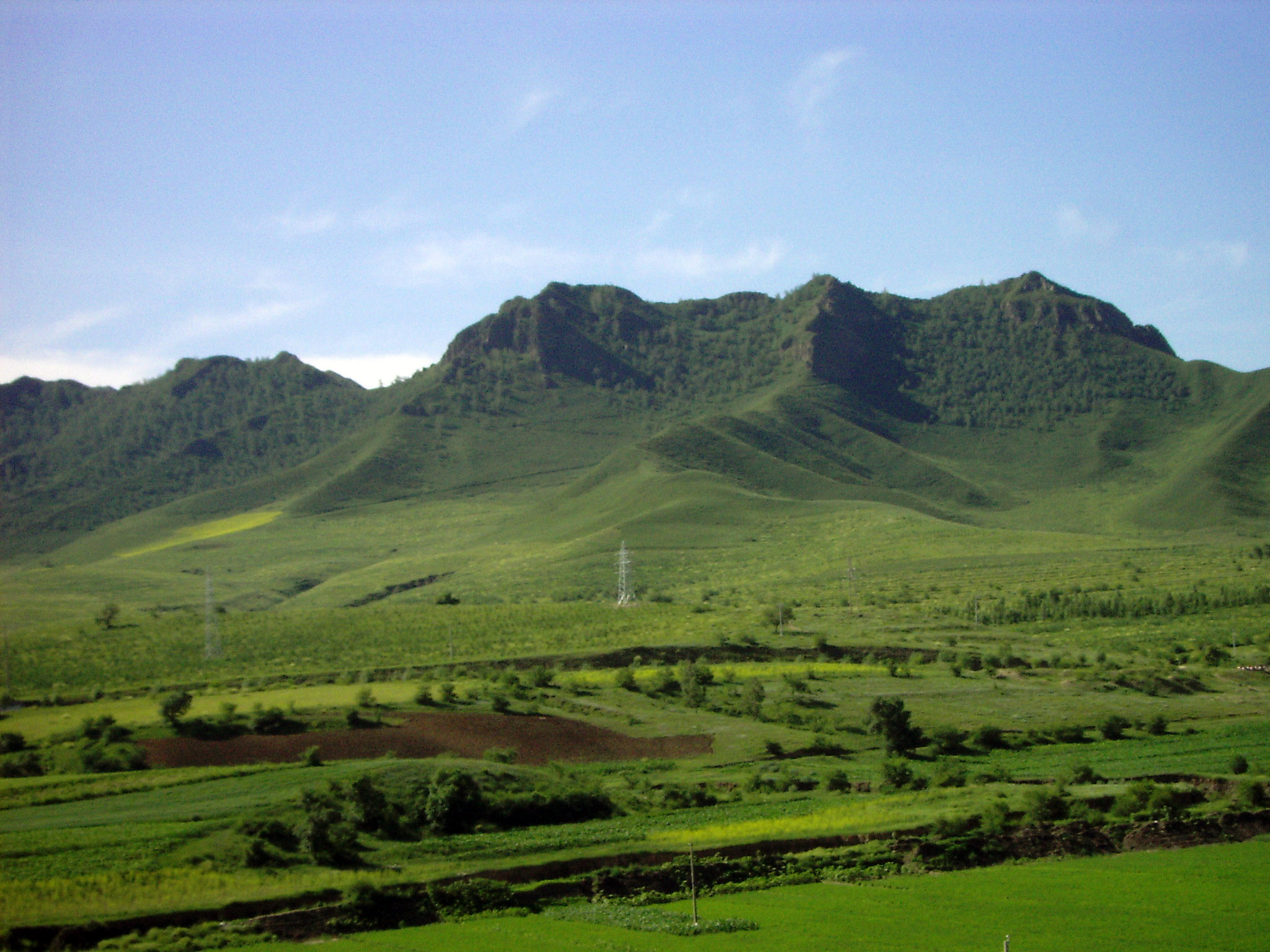
- Grasslands in the summer

- Location of the seat in Inner Mongolia Heshigten (China)
- Coordinates: 43°16′48″N 117°28′48″E
- Country: China
- Region: Inner Mongolia
- Prefecture-level city: Chifeng
- Banner seat: Jingpeng

Area
  - Total: 20,637 km^{2} (7,968 sq mi)
- Elevation: 1,100 m (3,600 ft)

Population (2020)
  - Total: 186,143
  - Density: 9.0199/km^{2} (23.361/sq mi)
- Time zone: UTC+8 (China Standard)
- Postal code: 025350
- Area code: 0476
- Website: www.kskt.gov.cn

Hexigten Banner

Chinese name
- Simplified Chinese: 克什克腾旗
- Traditional Chinese: 克什克騰旗
Transcriptions
Standard Mandarin
- Hanyu Pinyin: Kèshíkèténg Qí

Mongolian name
- Mongolian Cyrillic: Хишигтэн хошуу
- Mongolian script: ᠬᠡᠰᠢᠭᠲᠡᠨ ᠬᠣᠰᠢᠭᠤ
Transcriptions
- SASM/GNC: Kesigten qosiɣu

Hexigten Banner (Mongolian: ᠬᠡᠰᠢᠭᠲᠡᠨ ᠬᠣᠰᠢᠭᠤ; Chinese: 克什克腾旗) is a banner of Inner Mongolia, China under the jurisdiction of Chifeng, bordering Hebei province to the south. In 1690 the Battle of Ulan Butung between Qing and Dzungar forces took place here.

== Etymology ==
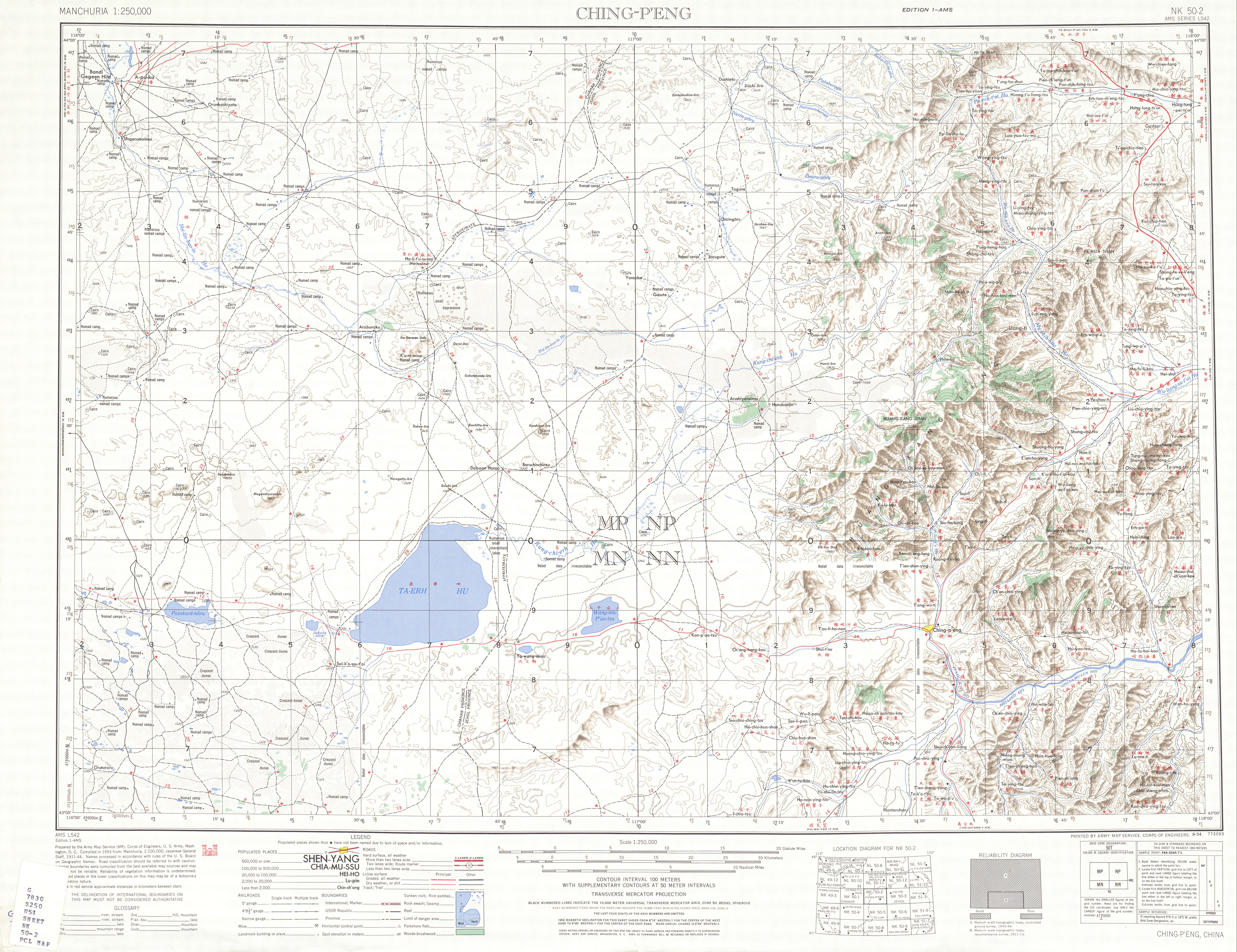
Map including areas in modern-day Hexigten Banner (AMS, 1953)

It was named after the Khishigten Mongol clan, who were considered to be the descendants of the Kheshig, the imperial guard and shock troops of the Mongol Empire.

== Demographics ==
There are 8 main ethnic groups (i.e. Han, Mongol, Hui, Manchu, Daur, Korean, Dong and Zhuang). The Mongols are of the Hishigten division.

== Administrative divisions ==
Hexigten Banner is made up of 3 subdistricts, 7 towns, 2 townships, and 4 sums.

Name	Simplified Chinese	Hanyu Pinyin	Mongolian (Hudum Script)	Mongolian (Cyrillic)	Administrative division code
Subdistricts
Yingchang Subdistrict	应昌街道	Yīngchāng Jiēdào	ᠶᠢᠩ ᠴᠠᠩ ᠵᠡᠭᠡᠯᠢ ᠭᠤᠳᠤᠮᠵᠢ	Ин цан зээл гудамж	150425400
Reshuitang Subdistrict	热水塘街道	Rèshuǐtáng Jiēdào	ᠭᠠᠯᠳᠠᠰᠤᠲᠠᠢ ᠵᠡᠭᠡᠯᠢ ᠭᠤᠳᠤᠮᠵᠢ	Галдастай зээл гудамж	150425401
Xar Moron Subdistrict	西拉沐沦街道	Xīlāmùlún Jiēdào	ᠰᠢᠷᠠᠮᠥ᠋ᠷᠡᠨ ᠵᠡᠭᠡᠯᠢ ᠭᠤᠳᠤᠮᠵᠢ	Ширмран зээл гудамж	150425403
Towns
Jingpeng Town	经棚镇	Jīngpéng Zhèn	ᠪᠢᠷᠠᠭᠤ ᠪᠠᠯᠭᠠᠰᠤ	Бяруу балгас	150425100
Yuzhoudi Town	宇宙地镇	Yǔzhòudì Zhèn	ᠢᠦᠢ ᠵᠧᠦ ᠳ᠋ᠢ ᠪᠠᠯᠭᠠᠰᠤ	Юй жүү ди балгас	150425101
Tuchengzi Town	土城子镇	Tǔchéngzi Zhèn	ᠲᠤ ᠴᠧᠩᠽᠢ ᠪᠠᠯᠭᠠᠰᠤ	Ад цэнз балгас	150425102
Tongxing Town	同兴镇	Tóngxīng Zhèn	ᠲᠦᠩ ᠰᠢᠩ ᠪᠠᠯᠭᠠᠰᠤ	Дүн шин балгас	150425103
Wanheyong Town	万合永镇	Wànhéyǒng Zhèn	ᠸᠠᠨ ᠾᠧ ᠶᠦᠩ ᠪᠠᠯᠭᠠᠰᠤ	Ван ге юн балгас	150425104
Zhirui Town	芝瑞镇	Zhīruì Zhèn	ᡁᠢ ᠷᠦᠢ ᠪᠠᠯᠭᠠᠰᠤ	Зии руу балгас	150425105
Dalai Nur Town	达来诺日镇	Dáláinuòrì Zhèn	ᠳᠠᠯᠠᠢᠨᠠᠭᠤᠷ ᠪᠠᠯᠭᠠᠰᠤ	Далайнуур балгас	150425106
Towns
Xinkaidi Township	新开地乡	Xīnkāidì Xiāng	ᠰᠢᠨ ᠺᠠᠢ ᠳ᠋ᠢ ᠰᠢᠶᠠᠩ	Шин кай ди шиян	150425200
Hongshanzi Township	红山子乡	Hóngshānzi Xiāng	ᠬᠤᠩ ᠱᠠᠨᠽᠢ ᠰᠢᠶᠠᠩ	Хон шанз шиян	150425201
Sums
Darhan Ul Sum	达日罕乌拉苏木	Dárìhǎnwūlā Sūmù	ᠳᠠᠷᠬᠠᠨ᠌ᠠᠭᠤᠯᠠ ᠰᠤᠮᠤ	Дархануул сум	150425202
Bayan Qagan Sum	巴彦查干苏木	Bāyànchágàn Sūmù	ᠪᠠᠶᠠᠨᠴᠠᠭᠠᠨ ᠰᠤᠮᠤ	Баянцагаан сум	150425203
Hurai Hure Sum	浩来呼热苏木	Hàoláihūrè Sūmù	ᠬᠠᠭᠤᠷᠠᠢ ᠬᠦᠷᠢᠶ᠎ᠡ ᠰᠤᠮᠤ	Хуурай хүрээ сум	150425204
Ulan Butung Sum	乌兰布统苏木	Wūlánbùtǒng Sūmù	ᠤᠯᠠᠭᠠᠨᠪᠤᠲᠤᠩ ᠰᠤᠮᠤ	Улаанбудон сум	150425205

== Climate ==
Climate data for Hexigten Banner, elevation 1,003 m (3,291 ft), (1991–2020 normals, extremes 1981–2010)
Month	Jan	Feb	Mar	Apr	May	Jun	Jul	Aug	Sep	Oct	Nov	Dec	Year
Record high °C (°F)	4.0 (39.2)	14.2 (57.6)	22.3 (72.1)	31.5 (88.7)	34.7 (94.5)	36.2 (97.2)	37.8 (100.0)	35.6 (96.1)	33.4 (92.1)	26.8 (80.2)	20.4 (68.7)	11.6 (52.9)	37.8 (100.0)
Mean daily maximum °C (°F)	−10.3 (13.5)	−5.0 (23.0)	3.6 (38.5)	13.3 (55.9)	20.8 (69.4)	25.1 (77.2)	27.4 (81.3)	26.2 (79.2)	21.1 (70.0)	12.4 (54.3)	1.0 (33.8)	−8.1 (17.4)	10.6 (51.1)
Daily mean °C (°F)	−16.4 (2.5)	−12.2 (10.0)	−3.8 (25.2)	5.8 (42.4)	13.3 (55.9)	18.0 (64.4)	20.9 (69.6)	18.9 (66.0)	12.8 (55.0)	4.4 (39.9)	−5.7 (21.7)	−14.0 (6.8)	3.5 (38.3)
Mean daily minimum °C (°F)	−21.2 (−6.2)	−17.9 (−0.2)	−10.1 (13.8)	−1.6 (29.1)	5.4 (41.7)	10.9 (51.6)	14.7 (58.5)	12.5 (54.5)	5.7 (42.3)	−2.0 (28.4)	−10.9 (12.4)	−18.7 (−1.7)	−2.8 (27.0)
Record low °C (°F)	−35.3 (−31.5)	−31.3 (−24.3)	−27.8 (−18.0)	−17.1 (1.2)	−5.4 (22.3)	0.7 (33.3)	4.8 (40.6)	2.3 (36.1)	−7.4 (18.7)	−14.9 (5.2)	−28.5 (−19.3)	−33.2 (−27.8)	−35.3 (−31.5)
Average precipitation mm (inches)	2.5 (0.10)	3.6 (0.14)	7.5 (0.30)	17.4 (0.69)	43.4 (1.71)	64.2 (2.53)	106.0 (4.17)	74.7 (2.94)	37.8 (1.49)	20.0 (0.79)	8.6 (0.34)	3.8 (0.15)	389.5 (15.35)
Average precipitation days (≥ 0.1 mm)	4.5	3.9	5.4	5.6	8.4	13.7	15.3	11.7	8.7	6.6	5.6	5.9	95.3
Average snowy days	10.1	7.8	8.8	5.3	0.9	0	0	0	0.5	4.5	9.1	12.0	59
Average relative humidity (%)	64	60	51	42	43	58	67	67	60	55	59	64	58
Mean monthly sunshine hours	211.3	221.7	265.0	263.3	286.7	273.6	267.6	277.4	250.1	235.0	197.1	191.2	2,940
Percentage possible sunshine	72	74	71	65	63	60	58	65	68	70	69	69	67
Source: China Meteorological Administration

== Transport ==
- China National Highway 303
- China National Highway 306
- Hanbai Highway
- Jitong Railway

== Economy ==
The main industries are mining, renewable energy, tourism, and stock breeding. From 2006 to 2008, Hexigten ranked No. 1 for 3 consecutive years in wind power production among all the counties of China with 532 wind turbines installed in 2008, totally installed generating capacity of 525 megawatt and annual energy generation of 1124 GWh.

== Sights ==
- Heshigten Global Geopark is one of the UNESCO Global Geoparks. Its 1,750 km^{2} area is contained in eight separate areas of scenic beauty and geologic significance, including volcanic, glacial, and desert features.
