= Hongshan District, Chifeng =

Hongshan 红山区 • ᠬᠦᠩ ᠱᠠᠨ ᠲᠣᠭᠣᠷᠢᠭ
- District
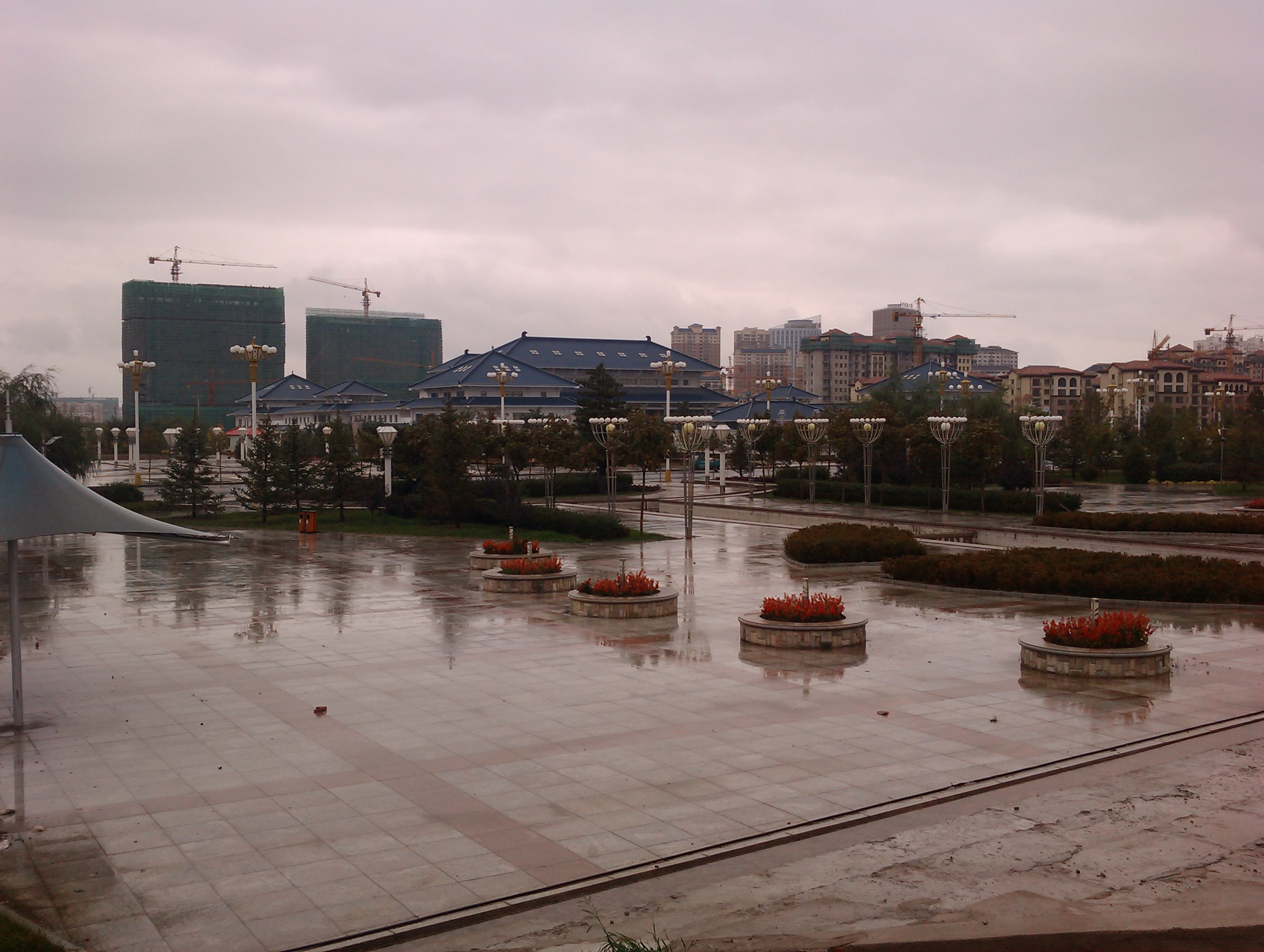
- Panoramic

- Location within Inner Mongolia Location within China
- Coordinates: 42°15′55″N 118°57′34″E
- Country: China
- Autonomous region: Inner Mongolia
- Prefecture-level city: Chifeng
- District seat: Qiaobei Subdistrict

Area
  - Total: 499.8 km^{2} (193.0 sq mi)
- Elevation: 569 m (1,867 ft)

Population (2020)
  - Total: 469,079
  - Density: 938.5/km^{2} (2,431/sq mi)
- Time zone: UTC+8 (China Standard)
- Website: www.hongshanqu.gov.cn

Hongshan District, Chifeng

Chinese name
- Simplified Chinese: 红山区
- Traditional Chinese: 紅山區
- Literal meaning: red mountain
Transcriptions
Standard Mandarin
- Hanyu Pinyin: Hóngshān Qū

Mongolian name
- Mongolian Cyrillic: Хүн шин дугараг
- Mongolian script: ᠬᠦᠩ ᠱᠠᠨ ᠲᠣᠭᠣᠷᠢᠭ
Transcriptions
- SASM/GNC: Küŋ šan toɣoriɣ

Hongshan District (Mongolian: ᠬᠦᠩ ᠱᠠᠨ ᠲᠣᠭᠣᠷᠢᠭ; Chinese: 红山区) is a district of the city of Chifeng, Inner Mongolia, China.

== Administrative divisions ==
Hongshan District is made up of 11 subdistricts and 2 towns.

Name	Simplified Chinese	Hanyu Pinyin	Mongolian (Hudum Script)	Mongolian (Cyrillic)	Administrative division code
Subdistricts
Xitun Subdistrict	西屯街道	Xītún Jiēdào	ᠰᠢ ᠲᠦᠨ ᠵᠡᠭᠡᠯᠢ ᠭᠤᠳᠤᠮᠵᠢ	Ший түн зээл гудамж	150402001
Sanzhong Street Subdistrict	三中街街道	Sānzhōngjiē Jiēdào	ᠭᠤᠷᠪᠠᠳᠤᠭᠠᠷ ᠳᠤᠮᠳᠠᠳᠤ ᠵᠡᠭᠡᠯᠢ ᠶᠢᠨ ᠵᠡᠭᠡᠯᠢ ᠭᠤᠳᠤᠮᠵᠢ	Гуравдугаар дундад зээлийн зээл гудамж	150402002
Yongju Subdistrict	永巨街道	Yǒngjù Jiēdào	ᠶᠦᠩ ᠵᠢᠦᠢ ᠵᠡᠭᠡᠯᠢ ᠭᠤᠳᠤᠮᠵᠢ	Юн жууй зээл гудамж	150402003
Dongcheng Subdistrict	东城街道	Dōngchéng Jiēdào	ᠳ᠋ᠦᠩ ᠴᠧᠩ ᠵᠡᠭᠡᠯᠢ ᠭᠤᠳᠤᠮᠵᠢ	Дүн цэн зээл гудамж	150402004
Nanxin Street Subdistrict	南新街街道	Nánxīnjiē Jiēdào	ᠨᠠᠨ ᠰᠢᠨ ᠵᠡᠭᠡᠯᠢ ᠶᠢᠨ ᠵᠡᠭᠡᠯᠢ ᠭᠤᠳᠤᠮᠵᠢ	Нон шин зээлийн зээл гудамж	150402005
Zhanqian Subdistrict	站前街道	Zhànqián Jiēdào	ᠥᠷᠲᠡᠭᠡᠨ ᠡᠮᠦᠨᠡᠬᠢ ᠵᠡᠭᠡᠯᠢ ᠭᠤᠳᠤᠮᠵᠢ	Өртөөн өмнөх зээл гудамж	150402006
Tienan Subdistrict	铁南街道	Tiěnán Jiēdào	ᠲᠢᠶᠧ ᠨᠠᠨ ᠵᠡᠭᠡᠯᠢ ᠭᠤᠳᠤᠮᠵᠢ	Тие нон зээл гудамж	150402007
Changqing Subdistrict	长青街道	Chángqīng Jiēdào	ᠴᠠᠩ ᠴᠢᠩ ᠵᠡᠭᠡᠯᠢ ᠭᠤᠳᠤᠮᠵᠢ	Цан чин зээл гудамж	150402008
Had Subdistrict	哈达街道	Hǎdá Jiēdào	ᠬᠠᠳᠠ ᠵᠡᠭᠡᠯᠢ ᠭᠤᠳᠤᠮᠵᠢ	Хад зээл гудамж	150402009
Xicheng Subdistrict	西城街道	Xīchéng Jiēdào	ᠪᠠᠷᠠᠭᠤᠨ ᠬᠣᠲᠠ ᠶᠢᠨ ᠵᠡᠭᠡᠯᠢ ᠭᠤᠳᠤᠮᠵᠢ	Баруун хотын зээл гудамж	150402010
Qiaobei Subdistrict	桥北街道	Qiáoběi Jiēdào	ᠴᠢᠶᠣᠤ ᠪᠧᠢ ᠵᠡᠭᠡᠯᠢ ᠭᠤᠳᠤᠮᠵᠢ	Чяо бей зээл гудамж	150402011
Towns
Hongmiaozi Town	红庙子镇	Hóngmiàozǐ Zhèn	ᠬᠤᠩ ᠮᠢᠶᠣᠤᠽᠢ ᠪᠠᠯᠭᠠᠰᠤ	Хон мяози балгас	150402100
Wenzhong Town	文钟镇	Wénzhōng Zhèn	ᠸᠧᠨ ᠵᠦᠩ ᠪᠠᠯᠭᠠᠰᠤ	Вен жүн балгас	150402102

Others:

- Hongshan Industrial Park, Chifeng High-tech Industrial Development Zone Management Committee (赤峰高新技术产业开发区管理委员会红山产业园)
- Inner Mongolia Hongshan Logistics Park (内蒙古红山物流园区, ᠥᠪᠥᠷ ᠮᠣᠩᠭᠣᠯ ᠤᠨ ᠬᠤᠩ ᠱᠠᠨ ᠡᠳ᠋ ᠪᠣᠳᠠᠰ ᠤᠨ ᠨᠡᠭᠦᠳᠡᠯ ᠦᠨ ᠲᠣᠭᠣᠷᠢᠭ)
