= Suizhong County =

Suizhong 绥中县 Suichung
- County
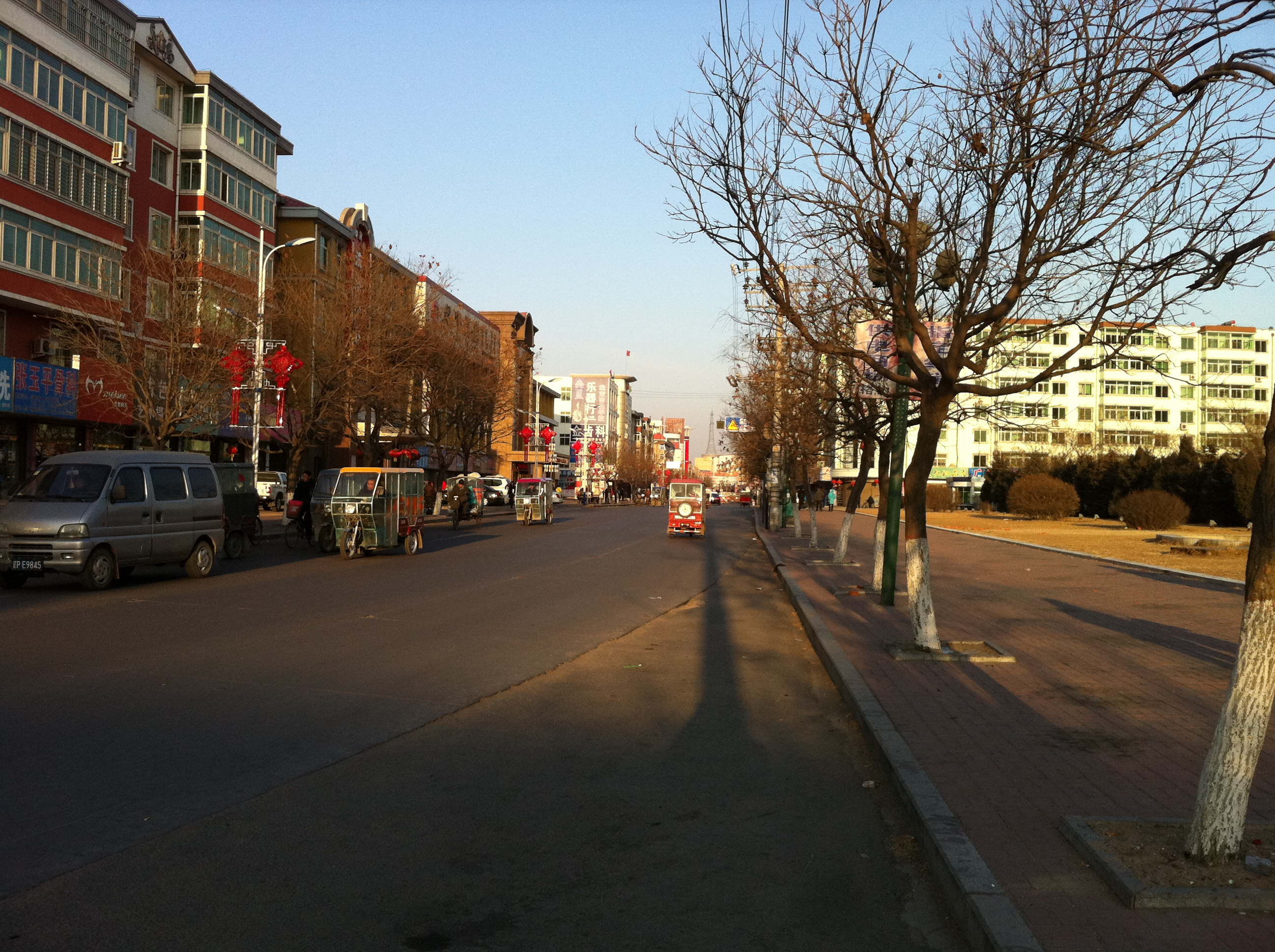

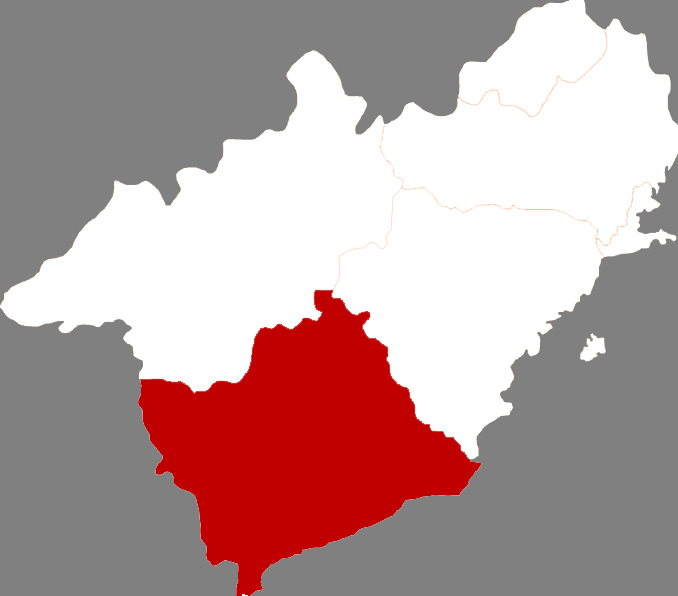
- Location in Huludao City

- Location of the seat in Liaoning
- Coordinates: 40°20′N 120°21′E
- Country: People's Republic of China
- Province: Liaoning
- Prefecture-level city: Huludao
- County seat: Suizhong Town (绥中镇)

Area
  - Total: 2,765 km^{2} (1,068 sq mi)
- Elevation: 17 m (56 ft)

Population (2020 census)
  - Total: 545,963
  - Density: 197.5/km^{2} (511.4/sq mi)
- Time zone: UTC+8 (China Standard)
- Postal code: 125200
- Area code: 0429

Suizhong County (simplified Chinese: 绥中县; traditional Chinese: 綏中縣; pinyin: Suízhōng Xiàn) is a county of southwestern Liaoning, People's Republic of China. It is located on the northern coast of the Bohai Sea and is the southernmost county of Huludao City (as well as non-peninsular Liaoning), bordering Hebei to the southwest. The county has an area of 2,765 square kilometres (1,068 sq mi), a population of 550,000, and is an economically important region within Huludao. Suizhong is home to the first Chinese citizen to travel in space, Yang Liwei, and Wu Sangui, a warlord.

== Administrative divisions ==
There are 14 towns, five townships, and six ethnic townships in the county.

Towns:

- Suizhong Town (Suichung) (绥中镇)
- Qianwei (Tsienwei) (前卫镇)
- Wanjia (万家镇)
- Qiansuo (前所镇)
- Gaoling (高岭镇)
- Tashantun (塔山屯镇)
- Xidianzi (西甸子镇)
- Wangbao (王宝镇)
- Huangdi (荒地镇)
- Kuanbang (宽邦镇)
- Dawangmiao (大王庙镇)
- Xiaozhuangzi (小庄子镇)
- Gaotai (高台镇)
- Shahe (沙河镇)

Townships:

- Qiuzigou Township (秋子沟乡)
- Jiabeiyan Township (加碑岩乡)
- Yong'anbao Township (永安堡乡)
- Lijiabao Township (李家堡乡)
- Chengjiao Township (城郊乡)
- Xipingpo Manchu Ethnic Township (西平坡满族乡)
- Gejia Manchu Ethnic Township (葛家满族乡)
- Gaodianzi Manchu Ethnic Township (高甸子满族乡)
- Fanjia Manchu Ethnic Township (范家满族乡)
- Wanghu Manchu Ethnic Township (网户满族乡)
- Mingshui Manchu Ethnic Township (明水满族乡)

== Climate ==
Suizhong County has a monsoon-influenced humid continental climate (Köppen Dwa), with cold, very dry, and rather long winters, and hot, humid summers; a majority of the annual rainfall occurs in July and August alone. The monthly 24-hour average temperature ranges from −7.1 °C (19.2 °F) in January to 24.3 °C (75.7 °F) in July, while the annual mean is 10.0 °C (50.0 °F); however, high temperatures peak in August. Due to the coastal location, temperatures are moderated in the summer, but prevailingly northerly and westerly winds minimise maritime influence during winter.

Climate data for Suizhong, elevation 29 m (95 ft), (1991–2020 normals, extremes 1971–2025)
Month	Jan	Feb	Mar	Apr	May	Jun	Jul	Aug	Sep	Oct	Nov	Dec	Year
Record high °C (°F)	12.7 (54.9)	19.1 (66.4)	29.3 (84.7)	32.9 (91.2)	37.9 (100.2)	39.0 (102.2)	38.1 (100.6)	35.6 (96.1)	33.7 (92.7)	30.6 (87.1)	24.5 (76.1)	15.3 (59.5)	39.0 (102.2)
Mean daily maximum °C (°F)	−0.3 (31.5)	3.1 (37.6)	9.3 (48.7)	17.0 (62.6)	23.4 (74.1)	26.5 (79.7)	28.8 (83.8)	29.0 (84.2)	25.5 (77.9)	18.4 (65.1)	8.9 (48.0)	1.8 (35.2)	16.0 (60.7)
Daily mean °C (°F)	−6.9 (19.6)	−3.3 (26.1)	3.2 (37.8)	11.0 (51.8)	17.6 (63.7)	21.7 (71.1)	24.6 (76.3)	24.3 (75.7)	19.4 (66.9)	11.9 (53.4)	2.8 (37.0)	−4.3 (24.3)	10.2 (50.3)
Mean daily minimum °C (°F)	−12.0 (10.4)	−8.4 (16.9)	−2.0 (28.4)	5.5 (41.9)	12.3 (54.1)	17.5 (63.5)	21.2 (70.2)	20.3 (68.5)	14.2 (57.6)	6.2 (43.2)	−2.2 (28.0)	−9.1 (15.6)	5.3 (41.5)
Record low °C (°F)	−26.4 (−15.5)	−22.4 (−8.3)	−13.1 (8.4)	−5.9 (21.4)	3.4 (38.1)	8.8 (47.8)	14.7 (58.5)	10.9 (51.6)	1.9 (35.4)	−6.0 (21.2)	−16.5 (2.3)	−23.0 (−9.4)	−26.4 (−15.5)
Average precipitation mm (inches)	2.5 (0.10)	4.1 (0.16)	7.0 (0.28)	26.2 (1.03)	53.6 (2.11)	89.9 (3.54)	156.2 (6.15)	178.1 (7.01)	47.7 (1.88)	31.3 (1.23)	14.1 (0.56)	2.9 (0.11)	613.6 (24.16)
Average precipitation days (≥ 0.1 mm)	1.7	1.9	2.6	5.5	6.7	9.8	11.1	9.0	6.4	4.7	3.5	1.9	64.8
Average snowy days	2.6	2.3	1.7	0.6	0	0	0	0	0	0.2	2.2	2.8	12.4
Average relative humidity (%)	54	54	52	53	58	73	83	81	72	64	58	55	63
Mean monthly sunshine hours	209.1	204.9	249.3	253.4	270.0	220.9	190.2	213.2	230.8	225.3	192.8	196.0	2,655.9
Percentage possible sunshine	70	68	67	63	60	49	42	51	63	66	65	68	61
Source 1: China Meteorological Administration October all-time Record
Source 2: Weather China
