= Chifeng =

Chifeng 赤峰市 ᠤᠯᠠᠭᠠᠨᠬᠠᠳᠠ ᠬᠣᠲᠠ
- Prefecture-level city
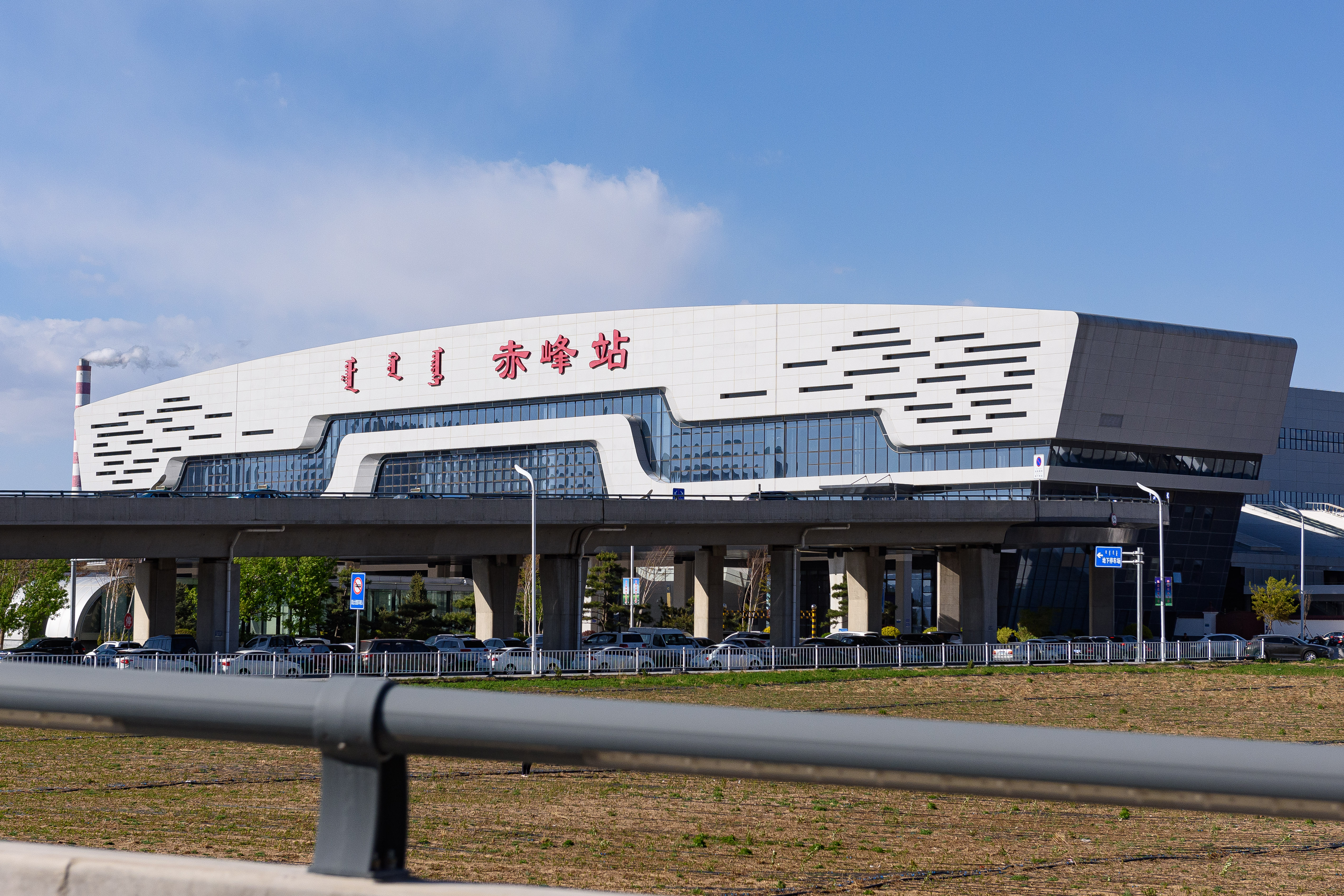
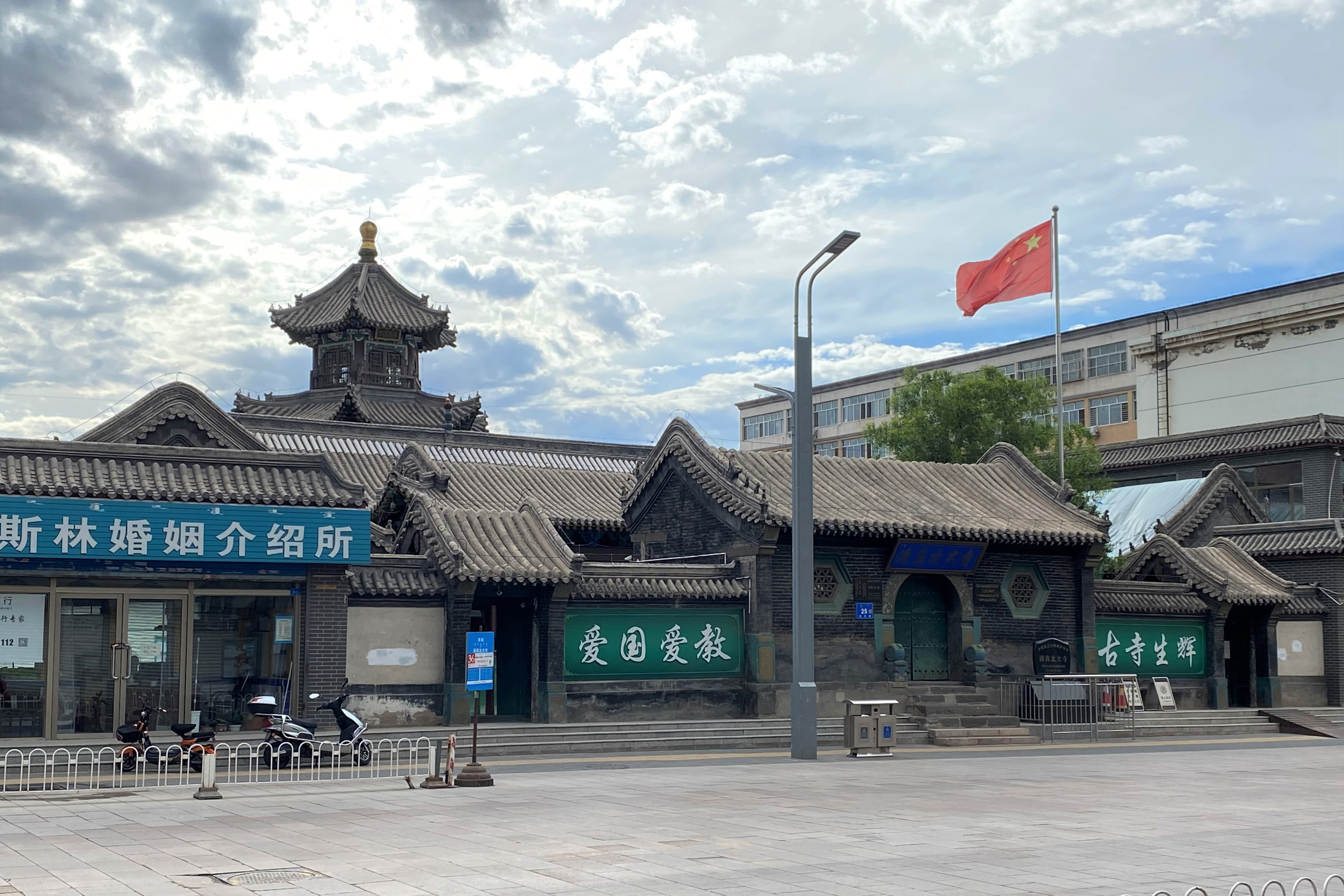
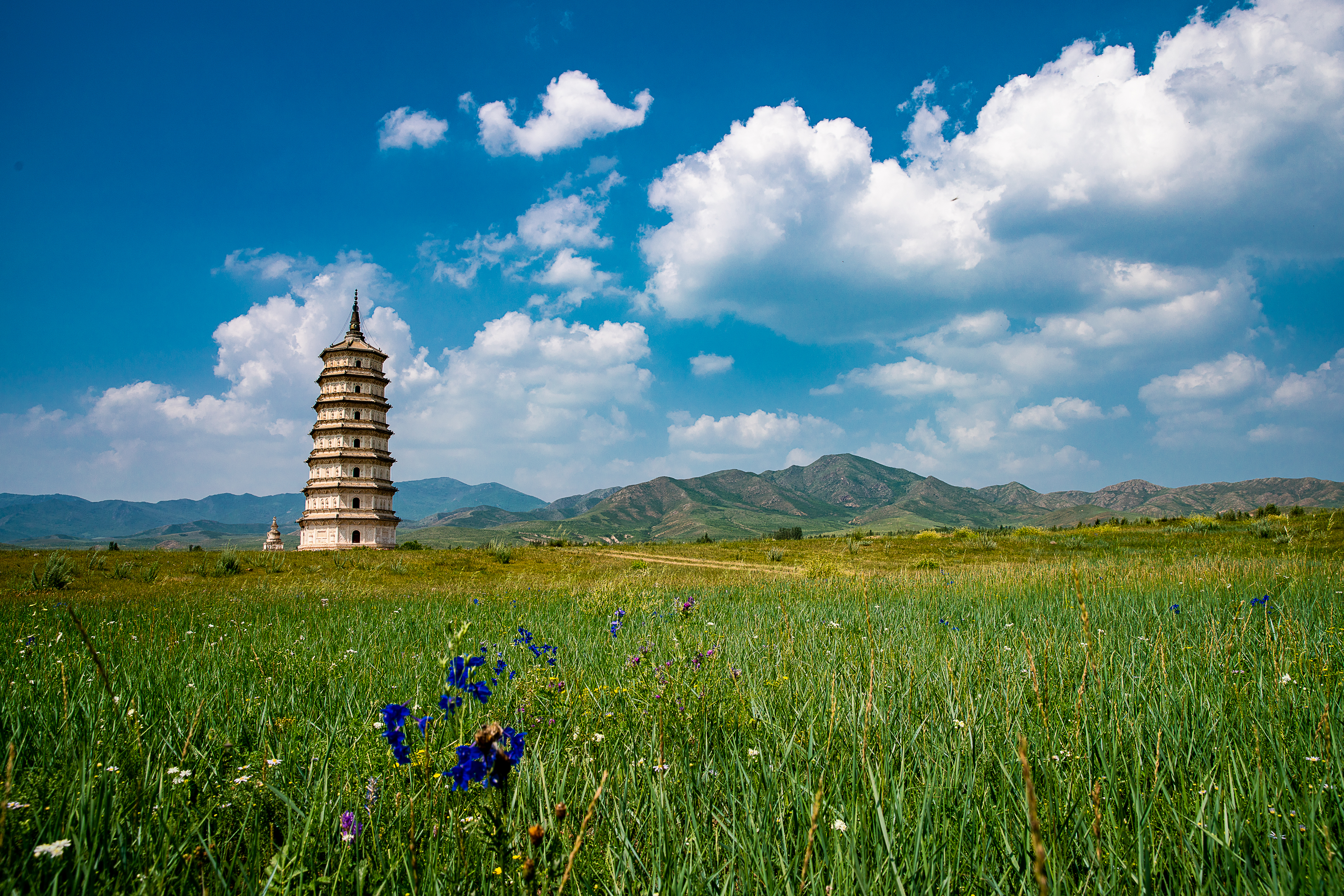
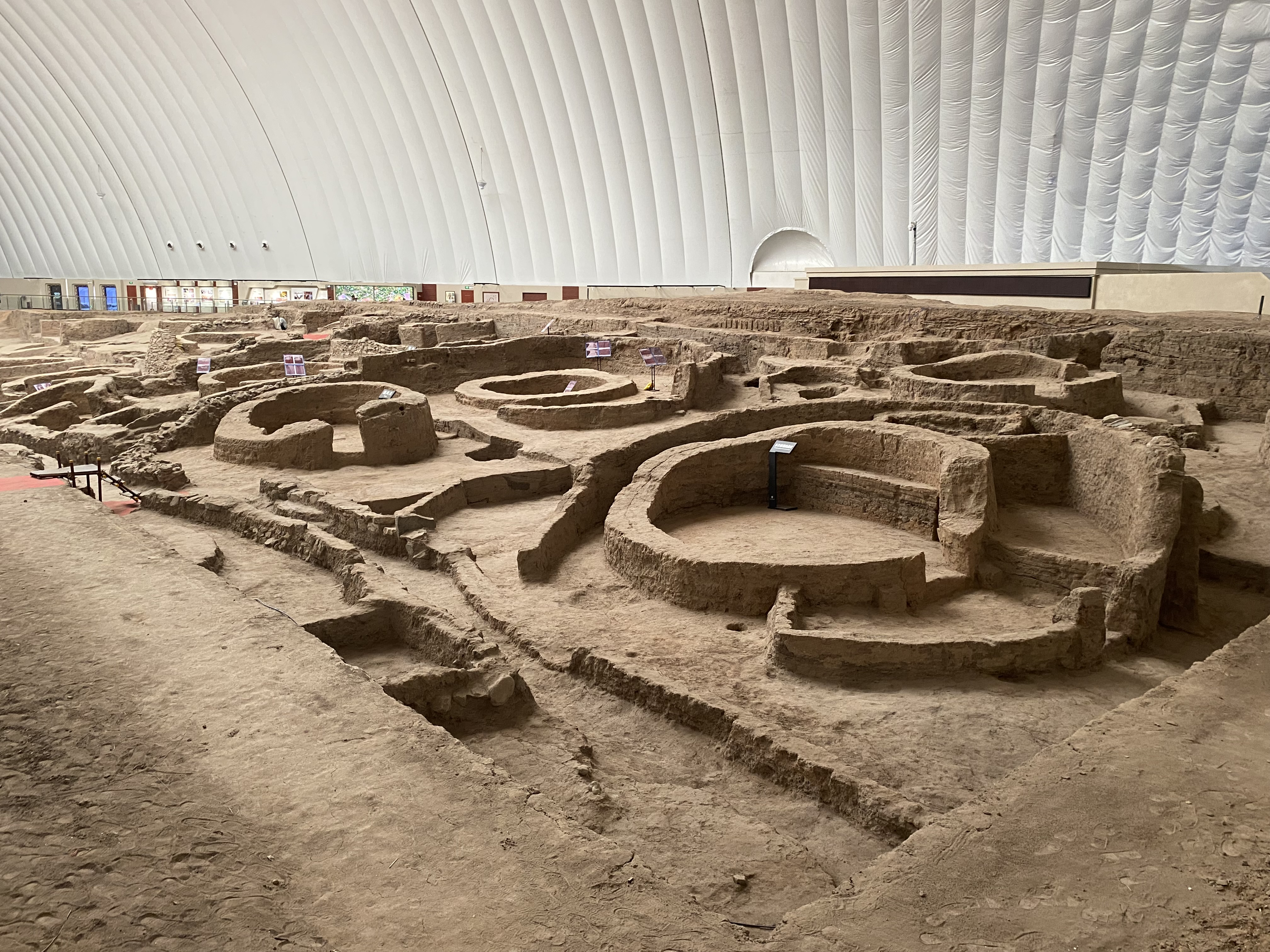
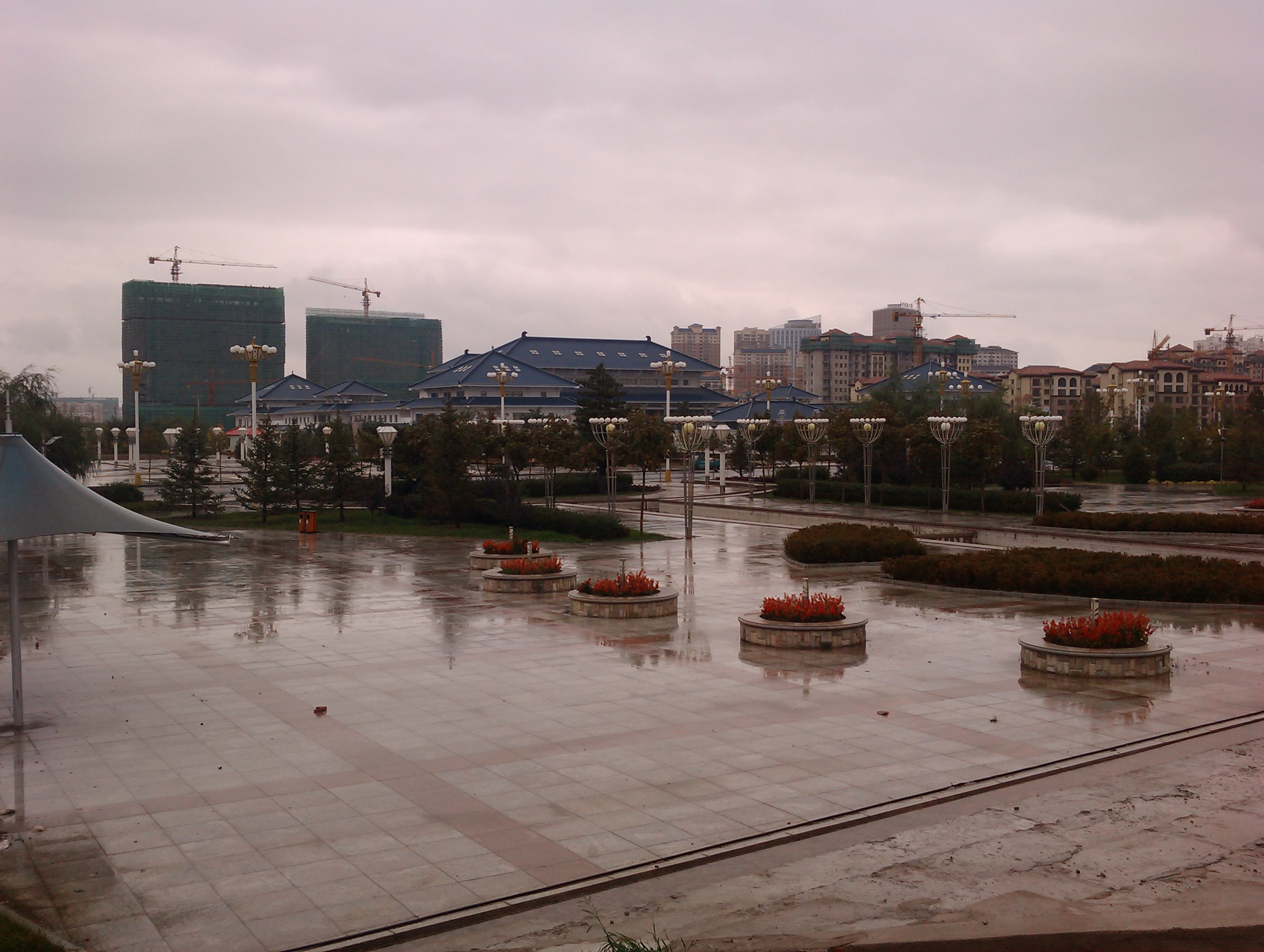
- From top, left to right: Chifeng Railway Station; Chifeng North Great Mosque; Qingzhou white pagoda, Bairin Right Banner; Lower Xiajiadian ruins, Erdaojingzi Site Museum; Hongshan District plaza

- Location of Chifeng City jurisdiction in Inner Mongolia

- Location of the city centre in Inner Mongolia Chifeng (China)
- Coordinates: 42°15′18″N 118°52′57″E
- Country: People's Republic of China
- Autonomous region: Inner Mongolia
- Municipal seat: Songshan District

Area
  - Prefecture-level city: 90,275 km^{2} (34,855 sq mi)
  - Urban: 7,012 km^{2} (2,707 sq mi)
  - Metro: 6,125 km^{2} (2,365 sq mi)
- Elevation: 586 m (1,923 ft)

Population (2020 census)
  - Prefecture-level city: 4,035,967
  - Density: 44.707/km^{2} (115.79/sq mi)
  - Urban: 1,460,381
  - Urban density: 208.3/km^{2} (539.4/sq mi)
  - Metro: 1,175,391
  - Metro density: 191.9/km^{2} (497.0/sq mi)

GDP
  - Prefecture-level city: CN¥ 186.1 billion US$ 29.9 billion
  - Per capita: CN¥ 43,269; US$ 6,947
- Time zone: UTC+8 (China Standard)
- Postal code: 024000
- Area code: 0476
- ISO 3166 code: CN-NM-04
- Licence plate prefixes: 蒙D
- Website: www.chifeng.gov.cn

Chifeng

Chinese name
- Chinese: 赤峰
- Hanyu Pinyin: Chìfēng
- Literal meaning: red peak
Transcriptions
Standard Mandarin
- Hanyu Pinyin: Chìfēng
- Bopomofo: ㄔˋ ㄈㄥ
- Gwoyeu Romatzyh: Chyhfeng
- Wade–Giles: Chʻih^{4}-fêng^{1}
- Yale Romanization: Chr̀fēng
- IPA: [ʈʂʰɻ̩̂.fə́ŋ]

Mongolian name
- Mongolian Cyrillic: Улаанхад хот
- Mongolian script: ᠤᠯᠠᠭᠠᠨᠬᠠᠳᠠ ᠬᠣᠲᠠ
Transcriptions
- SASM/GNC: Ulaɣanqada qota

Chifeng (Note: Chinese: 赤峰市; also known as Ulankhad (Mongolian: ᠤᠯᠠᠭᠠᠨᠬᠠᠳᠠ ᠬᠣᠲᠠ (Улаанхад хот), Ulaɣanqada qota, [ʊlaːnxad xɔt], "red cliff")) is a prefecture-level city in Southeastern Inner Mongolia, People's Republic of China. It borders Xilin Gol League to the north and west, Tongliao to the northeast, Chaoyang (Liaoning) to the southeast and Chengde (Hebei) to the south. The city has a total administrative area of 90,275 km^{2} (34,855 sq mi) and as of the 2020 census, had a population of 4,035,967 inhabitants (4,341,245 in 2010). However, 1,175,391 of those residents lived in the built-up (or metro) area made of the 2 urban districts of Hongshan and Songshan, as Yuanbaoshan is not conurbated yet. However, a large part of Songshan district is still rural and Yuanbaoshan district a de facto separate town 27 kilometers away from the core district of Chifeng. The city was the administrative center of the previous Ju Ud League. (Note: 昭乌达盟; ᠵᠤᠤ ᠤᠳᠠ ᠴᠢᠭᠤᠯᠭᠠᠨ)

== History ==
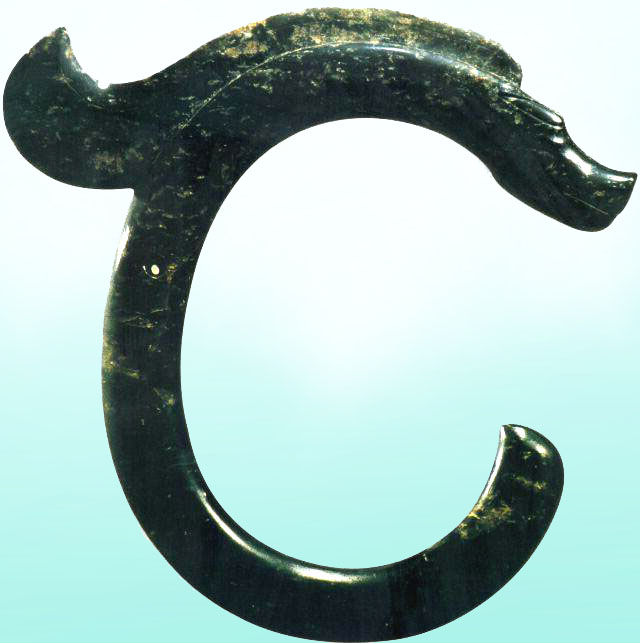
The C-shaped jade dragon of the Hongshan Culture

According to archeological studies, human occupation of the Chifeng area can be traced back at least ten thousand years, and Neolithic cultural history can be traced back nearly eight thousand years. Representative ruins and relics of Hongshan Culture, Grassland Bronze Culture, Liao eras have been discovered in Chifeng. The ruins of an ancient village, named Xinglongwa, and the biggest jade dragon unearthed in the area are noted as "the first village" and "the first dragon" by some. The discovery of ruins and relics of ancient cultures have come from more than 6,800 sites. Named after Chifeng's Hongshan District, Hongshan Culture was a Neolithic culture in northeastern China, whose sites have been found mainly in Chifeng, and dated from about 4700 to 2900 BC.

The area surrounding Chifeng was the political center and home to the Liao capital Shangjing Linhuangfu. Therefore, the amount of ruins and relics of the Liao regime is ranked the most important in Chifeng. Chifeng region was under the administration of 'Ju Ud League', one of the six original Leagues in Inner Mongolia. Mongolian Banners (county level regions) were organized into conventional assemblies at the league level. In republican era, Chifeng was under the administration of Rehe Province, along with parts of today's Liaoning and Hebei including Chaoyang and Chengde. Chifeng was occupied by the Japanese in 1933. Chifeng was established as the third largest city of Rehe Province after Chengde and Chaoyang. After Operation August Storm, the Soviet-Mongolian Cavalry-Mechanized Group entered Chifeng. After Rehe Province was rendered defunct in 1955, Chifeng was placed administratively under the newly established Inner Mongolia Autonomous Region under CCP rule, whose provincial seat was previously at Ulanhot and transferred to Zhangjiakou and then Hohhot in the 1950s. In the 1970s, going by the name Juud League, Chifeng was under the administration of Liaoning province. After 1979, Chifeng was under Inner Mongolian rule, and Ju Ud League was dissolved on 10 October 1983.

== Geography ==
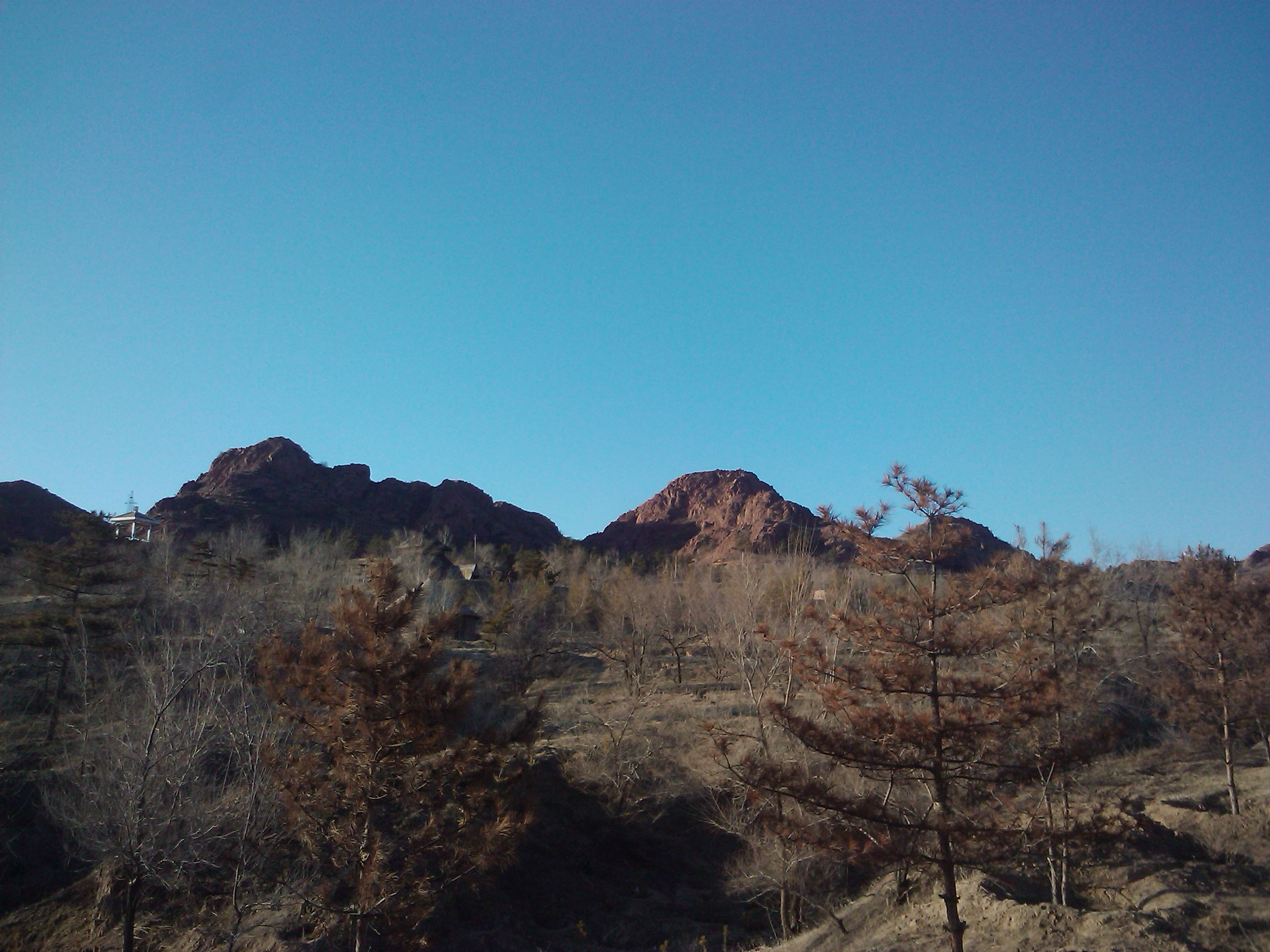
Hongshan, the "Red Hill", from which Chifeng received its name.

Chifeng is situated along the upper reaches of the Xiliao River. Within its area are the southwesternmost extension of the Greater Khingan, the Inner Mongolia Plateau as well as the Xiliao River Plain, and finally the northernmost extent of the Yan Mountains. Bordering prefecture-level divisions are Tongliao to the northeast, Chaoyang (Liaoning) to the southeast, Chengde (Hebei) to the south, and the Xilingol League and to the west. From north to south Chifeng City stretches 457.5 km (284.3 mi), while from east to west it stretches 375 km (233 mi). Elevations decrease from a high of 2,067 m (6,781 ft) in the west to less than 300 m (980 ft) in the east.

=== Climate ===
Chifeng has a four-season, monsoon-influenced, continental semi-arid climate (Köppen BSk), with long, cold, windy, but dry winters, and hot, humid summers. Monthly mean temperatures range from −10.4 °C (13.3 °F) in January to 23.7 °C (74.7 °F) in July, with an annual mean of 7.82 °C (46.1 °F). Nearly half of the year's rainfall occurs in July and August, and even then dry and sunny weather dominates the city. With monthly percent possible sunshine ranging from 55% in July to 71% in January and February, sunshine is abundant year-round, and the city receives 2,866 hours of bright sunshine annually, about 65% of the possible total.

Climate data for Chifeng, elevation 669 m (2,195 ft), (1991–2020 normals, extremes 1936–present)
Month	Jan	Feb	Mar	Apr	May	Jun	Jul	Aug	Sep	Oct	Nov	Dec	Year
Record high °C (°F)	11.3 (52.3)	20.4 (68.7)	28.2 (82.8)	33.8 (92.8)	39.0 (102.2)	39.8 (103.6)	40.4 (104.7)	37.8 (100.0)	34.6 (94.3)	29.4 (84.9)	22.2 (72.0)	15.6 (60.1)	40.4 (104.7)
Mean daily maximum °C (°F)	−3.1 (26.4)	1.2 (34.2)	8.1 (46.6)	17.0 (62.6)	24.0 (75.2)	27.8 (82.0)	29.6 (85.3)	28.3 (82.9)	23.7 (74.7)	15.8 (60.4)	5.4 (41.7)	−1.6 (29.1)	14.7 (58.4)
Daily mean °C (°F)	−10.2 (13.6)	−6.4 (20.5)	0.9 (33.6)	9.8 (49.6)	17.2 (63.0)	21.4 (70.5)	23.8 (74.8)	22.1 (71.8)	16.5 (61.7)	8.5 (47.3)	−1.4 (29.5)	−8.4 (16.9)	7.8 (46.1)
Mean daily minimum °C (°F)	−15.9 (3.4)	−12.6 (9.3)	−5.6 (21.9)	3.0 (37.4)	10.4 (50.7)	15.5 (59.9)	18.5 (65.3)	16.6 (61.9)	10.1 (50.2)	2.4 (36.3)	−6.7 (19.9)	−13.7 (7.3)	1.8 (35.3)
Record low °C (°F)	−29.5 (−21.1)	−26.5 (−15.7)	−23.9 (−11.0)	−13.9 (7.0)	−2.8 (27.0)	3.0 (37.4)	11.0 (51.8)	5.5 (41.9)	−2.3 (27.9)	−11.1 (12.0)	−22.8 (−9.0)	−25.9 (−14.6)	−29.5 (−21.1)
Average precipitation mm (inches)	1.2 (0.05)	2.5 (0.10)	6.7 (0.26)	18.4 (0.72)	36.6 (1.44)	69.5 (2.74)	114.6 (4.51)	73.1 (2.88)	32.1 (1.26)	21.0 (0.83)	6.7 (0.26)	1.3 (0.05)	383.7 (15.1)
Average precipitation days (≥ 0.1 mm)	1.5	1.6	2.8	4.2	7.5	12.7	12.9	10.1	6.9	4.1	2.8	1.4	68.5
Average snowy days	2.3	2.4	3.4	1.9	0.2	0.0	0.0	0.0	0.0	1.3	2.8	2.2	16.5
Average relative humidity (%)	44	40	37	37	39	55	65	66	57	49	49	47	49
Mean monthly sunshine hours	215.4	219.3	261.9	262.6	287.5	264.8	267.0	272.7	257.2	244.6	203.8	200.9	2,957.7
Percentage possible sunshine	73	73	70	65	63	58	58	64	70	72	70	71	67
Source 1: China Meteorological Administration
Source 2: Weather China, Pogodaiklimat.ru (extremes) all-time extreme temperature

== Administrative divisions ==
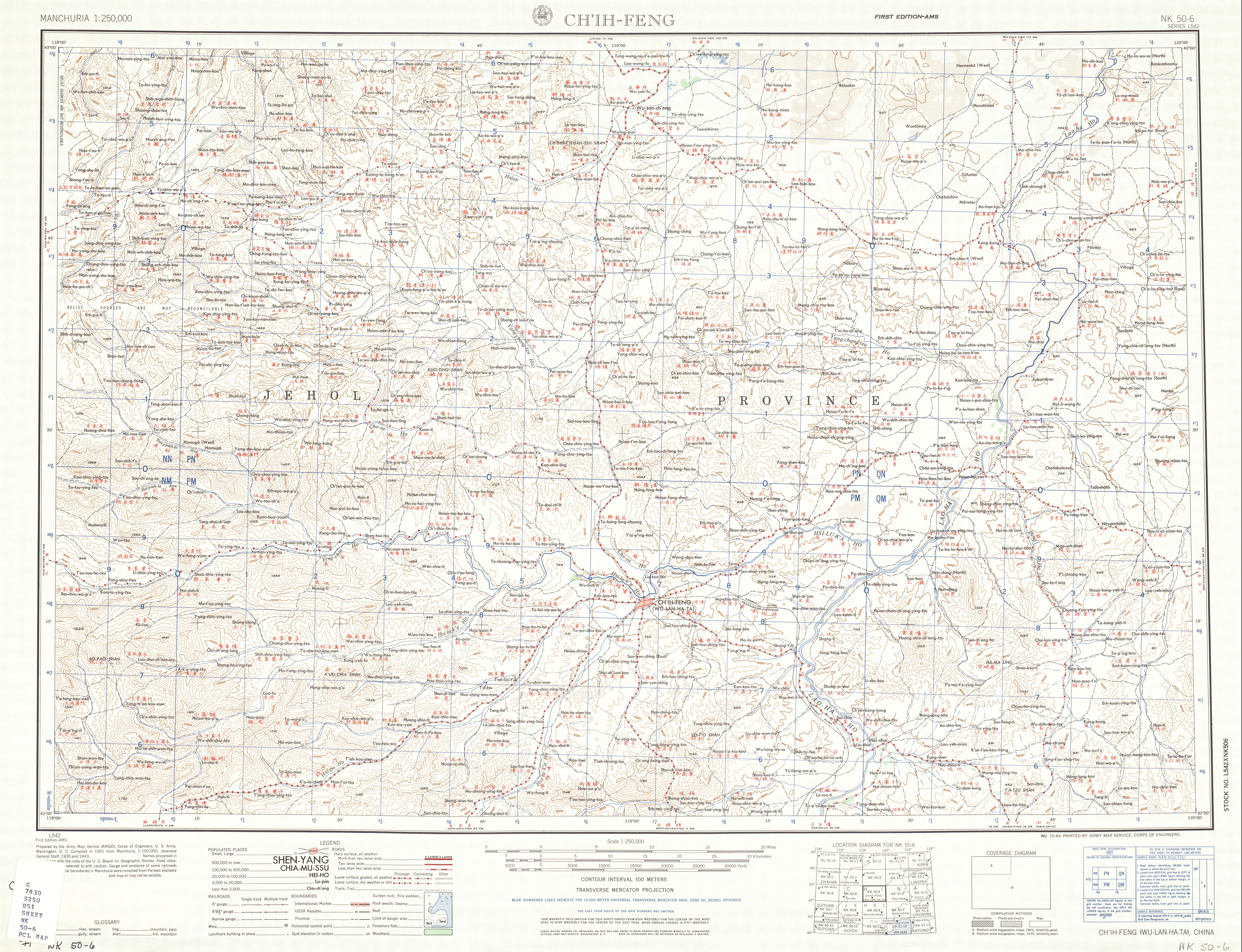
Map including Chifeng (labeled as CH'IH-FENG 赤峰 (WU-LAN-HA-TA)) (AMS, 1951)

Chifeng has three districts, two counties and seven banners:

Map
#	Name	Mongolian	Chinese characters	Pinyin	Population (2010)	Area (km^{2})	Density (/km^{2})
1	Hongshan District	ᠬᠦᠩ ᠱᠠᠨ ᠲᠣᠭᠣᠷᠢᠭ (Küŋ šan toɣoriɣ)	红山区	Hóngshān Qū	434,785	170	1,765
2	Yuanbaoshan District	ᠶᠤᠸᠠᠨ ᠪᠣᠣ ᠱᠠᠨ ᠲᠣᠭᠣᠷᠢᠭ (Yuvan boo šan toɣoriɣ)	元宝山区	Yuánbǎoshān Qū	325,170	887	327
3	Songshan District	ᠰᠦᠩ ᠱᠠᠨ ᠲᠣᠭᠣᠷᠢᠭ (Süŋ šan toɣoriɣ)	松山区	Sōngshān Qū	573,571	5,955	91
4	Ningcheng County	ᠨᠢᠩᠴᠧᠩ ᠰᠢᠶᠠᠨ (Niŋčėŋ siyan)	宁城县	Níngchéng Xiàn	546,845	4,305	139
5	Linxi County	ᠯᠢᠨᠰᠢ ᠰᠢᠶᠠᠨ (Linsi siyan)	林西县	Línxī Xiàn	200,619	3,933	61
6	Ar Horqin Banner	ᠠᠷᠤ ᠬᠣᠷᠴᠢᠨ ᠬᠣᠰᠢᠭᠤ (Aru Qorčin qosiɣu)	阿鲁科尔沁旗	Ālǔkē'ěrqìn Qí	272,205	14,555	21
7	Bairin Left Banner (Bairin Jun Banner)	ᠪᠠᠭᠠᠷᠢᠨ ᠵᠡᠭᠦᠨ ᠬᠣᠰᠢᠭᠤ (Baɣarin Jegün qosiɣu)	巴林左旗	Bālín Zuǒ Qí	327,765	6,713	52
8	Bairin Right Banner (Bairin Barun Banner)	ᠪᠠᠭᠠᠷᠢᠨ ᠪᠠᠷᠠᠭᠤᠨ ᠬᠣᠰᠢᠭᠤ (Baɣarin Baraɣun qosiɣu)	巴林右旗	Bālín Yòu Qí	175,543	9,837	18
9	Hexigten Banner	ᠬᠡᠰᠢᠭᠲᠡᠨ ᠬᠣᠰᠢᠭᠤ (Kesigten qosiɣu)	克什克腾旗	Kèshíkèténg Qí	211,155	20,673	12
10	Ongniud Banner	ᠣᠩᠨᠢᠭᠤᠳ ᠬᠣᠰᠢᠭᠤ (Oŋniɣud qosiɣu)	翁牛特旗	Wēngniútè Qí	433,298	11,882	40
11	Harqin Banner	ᠬᠠᠷᠠᠴᠢᠨ ᠬᠣᠰᠢᠭᠤ (Qaračin qosiɣu)	喀喇沁旗	Kālāqìn Qí	293,246	3,071	120
12	Aohan Banner	ᠠᠤᠬᠠᠨ ᠬᠣᠰᠢᠭᠤ (Auqan qosiɣu)	敖汉旗	Áohàn Qi	547,043	8,294	71

== Demographics ==
In 2004, Chifeng had 4,435,737 inhabitants (49.14 per km^{2}).

Ethnic group	population	share
Han	3,441,581	77.58%
Mongols	830,357	18.72%
Manchu	128,656	2.9%
Hui	31,122	0.7%
Koreans	1,614	0.04%
Zhuang	402	0.01%
Daur	386	0.01%
Other	1,619	0.04%

== Economy ==
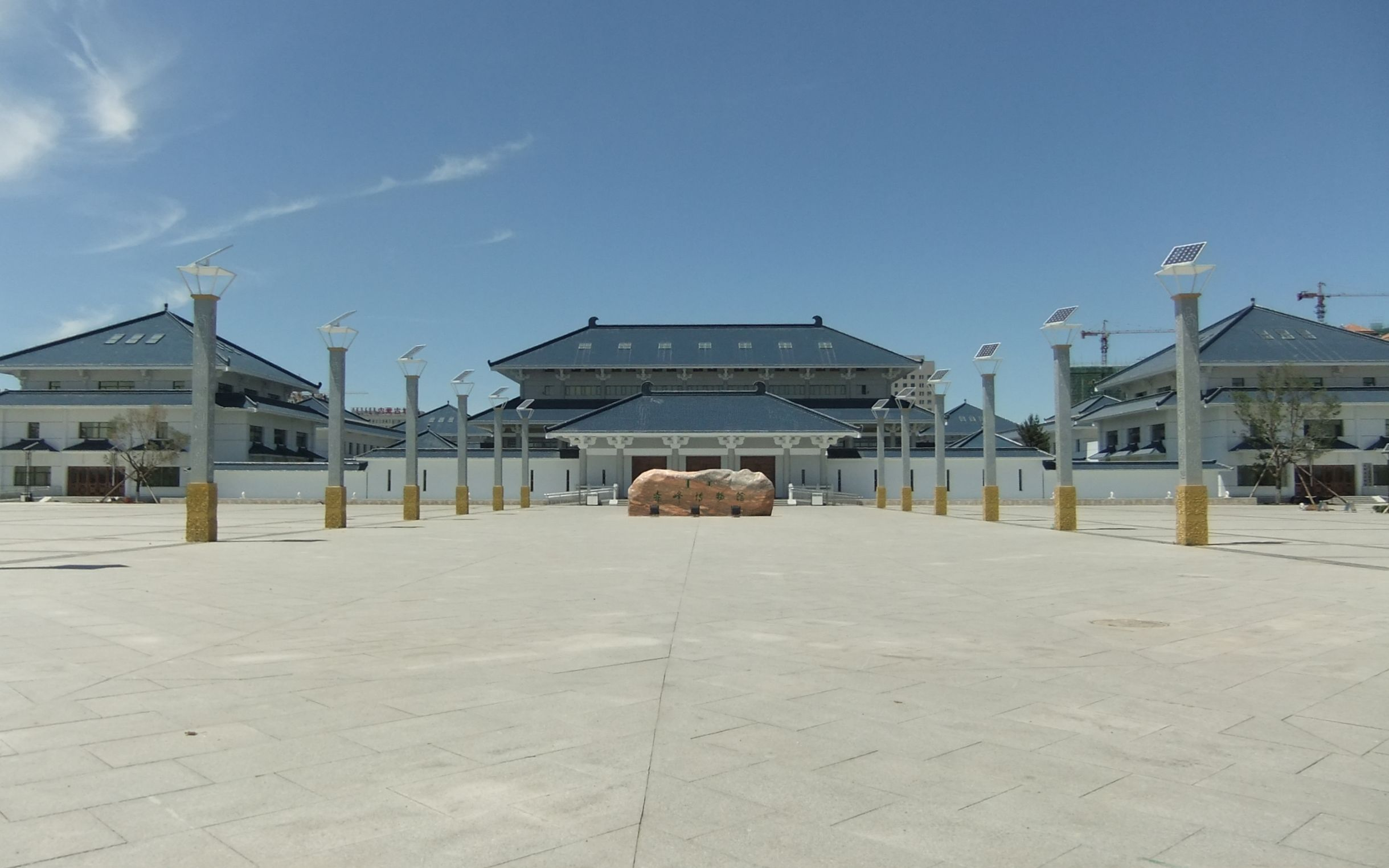
Chifeng Museum

During the period of "the 10th Five-Year Plan", Chifeng conducted the strategy of "found the municipality by ecology, strengthen the municipality by industry, prosper the municipality by science and education", by strengthening the development of resources, and seizing the historic opportunity of Western Development.

Following the strategy, Chifeng began tightening up ecological and infrastructure construction, actively promoting the process of agricultural and animal husbandry industrialization, industrialization and urbanization, greatly encouraging the development of service industry and county-level economy, trying to expand the general economy volume, increasing industry level, and enhancing the core competition.

As a result, the social economy development quickly. Currently, the industrial economic system dominated with minerals, energy, medicines and foods and the agricultural and animal husbandry industrialization development structure dominated with meat, milk, vegetables and grass in Chifeng has been initially taking into shape. Chifeng has become the base of agriculture and animal husbandry and industry of the eastern part of Inner Mongolia. Compared with those of the end of "the 9th Five-Year Plan", GDP of the municipality, average regional GDP and the fiscal income doubled, the investment of fixed asset quadrupled.

In 2005, GDP of the municipality reached 34.56 billion Yuan, fiscal income reached 3.15 billion Yuan, the investment of fixed asset reached 23.1 billion Yuan, the general retail amount of social consumption reached 13.7 billion Yuan, the urban per capita disposable income came to 7,572 Yuan and average pure income of farmers and herdsmen was 2,817 Yuan. Chifeng had been cited as "Pacesetter of National Sand Control and Ecological Construction", "National Sanitary City", "National Model City of supporting army and cherishing the people", "National Perfect Tourism City", "National perfect City in Social Security", "Perfect Area of Spiritual Civilization" and "China's 50 Credit security areas in investment environment".

During "11th Five-Year Plan", Chifeng is further conducting the development strategy of "found the municipality by ecology, strengthen the municipality by industry, prosper the municipality by science and education", by speeding up the process of new type industrialization, Agriculture and animal husbandry industrialization and urbanization, putting stress on industrial economy, project construction and investment introduction, in order to conscientiously increase fiscal income, average income of urban residents and farmers, try to create harmonious Chifeng.

It is planned that, by 2010, GDP will come to 85 billion Yuan, by around 20% up averagely; fiscal income will come to 10 billion Yuan, around 26% up averagely. Through the fast development during "11th Five-year Plan", Chifeng will be built as a producing base of green agricultural and animal husbandry products, energy supply base accessing to northeastern and northern China, important raw material and deep-processing base of nonferrous metal, tourism site of grassland, central city and goods interflow center between Inner Mongolia and Hebei.

=== Mineral resources ===
In mineral resources, there are over 70 mineral deposits. The area is rich in coal, oil and gas; nonferrous and ferrous metals, namely iron, tin, zinc, lead, gold, silver, molybdenum etc. have large reserves. Non-metal minerals include limestone, marble, fluorspar, silica, pearlite, bentonite etc.

In agricultural and animal husbandry products, besides the dominant crops of corn, rice, millet, there are cash crops like beans, buckwheat, oil-used sunflower seeds, sugar beets, tobacco, and Chinese herbals. Yearly yield of grains can reach 6 billion Jin. The facility agriculture featured by greenhouse and cold-keeping shed has come to 220,000mu. The area of natural grassland in the municipality is over 8,900mu. The raising livestock is over 14 million all over the municipality.

=== Power generation ===
In wind and water resources, there are many large and ideal national-grade wind power plants, and more than 60 large and middle size reservoirs. The ground water amounts to 5 billion m^{3}.

=== Industries ===
Major industries include finance, insurance, telecommunications, distribution, logistics, hotels and restaurants, leisure and entertainment. High-tech industrial zone spans 24 km^{2} (9.3 sq mi).

== Transportation ==
Chifeng is a transportation hub connecting the east and west area of Inner Mongolia. Tianjin, Beijing, Shenyang and other major cities are only 500 km (310 mi) away from Chifeng, while Jinzhou, Huludao, Qinhuangdao, are less than 300 km (190 mi) away.

=== Rail ===
Chifeng has direct train service from its train station to Beijing, Harbin, Shenyang, Dalian, Shanhaiguan, and Hebei.

=== Roads and expressways ===
- China National Highway 111
- China National Highway 306
- G16 Dandong–Xilinhot Expressway
- G45 Daqing–Guangzhou Expressway

There are 8 provincial and national highways linking Chifeng with surrounding cities, such as Hohhot and cities in Liaoning.

=== Air ===
Chifeng Yulong Airport has service to major cities such as Beijing, Hohhot, and other cities.

=== Bus ===
Chifeng Bus is a bus service serving Chifeng that has 38 lines.

== Education ==
- Chifeng University

== Notable people ==
- Bao Xishun, recognized as the world's tallest man from 2005 until 2007, is from Chifeng, as is his wife
- Chinggeltei, linguist
- Gungsangnorbu, jasagh and politician of the early Republic of China
- Ma Boyong, novelist, columnist and blogger
- Meng Fanlong, boxer
- Wang Likun, actress and dancer
- Wang Luodan, actress and singer
- Wu Guoqing, police detective and forensic scientist
- Wuliji Buren, mixed martial artist
- Zhang Wei (Theway Zhang), singer
- Zhao Hongzhu, politician

== See also ==
- Chifeng Petroglyphs

== Literature ==
- 今日内蒙古: 赤峰 (in Chinese (China)). Hohhot: Inner Mongolia People's Press. 1997. p. 9 and 121. ISBN 7-204-03544-5.
