= List of administrative divisions of Inner Mongolia =

Inner Mongolia Autonomous Region
- Autonomous region
- Capital: Hohhot

Prefecture-level divisions
- Prefectural cities: 9
- Leagues: 3

County level divisions
- County cities: 11
- Counties: 17
- Banners: 49
- Autonomous banners: 3
- Districts: 23

Township level divisions
- Towns: 532
- Townships: 407
- Ethnic townships: 18
- Sums: 277
- Ethnic sums: 1
- Subdistricts: 190

Villages level divisions
- Communities: 2,350
- Administrative villages / gaqa: 11,078

Inner Mongolia, an autonomous region of the People's Republic of China, is made up of prefecture-level divisions, which are divided into county-level divisions, which are then divided into township-level divisions.

== Administrative divisions ==
This chart lists only the prefecture-level and county-level divisions of Inner Mongolia.

Prefecture level	County Level							
Prefecture level	English name official	Mongolian	Mongolian Transliteration	SASM/GNC (broad) official transcription	Chinese	Pinyin	Division code	
Hohhot city ᠬᠥᠬᠡᠬᠣᠲᠠ; Kökeqota; Hohhot 呼和浩特市; Hūhéhàotè Shì (Capital) (1501 / HET)	Xincheng District	ᠰᠢᠨ᠎ᠡ ᠬᠣᠲᠠ ᠲᠣᠭᠣᠷᠢᠭ	Sin-e qota toγoriγ	Xin hot torig	新城区	Xīnchéng Qū	150102	XCN
Hohhot city ᠬᠥᠬᠡᠬᠣᠲᠠ; Kökeqota; Hohhot 呼和浩特市; Hūhéhàotè Shì (Capital) (1501 / HET)	Huimin District	ᠬᠣᠳᠣᠩ ᠠᠷᠠᠳ ᠤᠨ ᠲᠣᠭᠣᠷᠢᠭ	Qotoŋ arad-un toγoriγ	Hodong arad torig	回民区	Huímín Qū	150103	HMQ
Hohhot city ᠬᠥᠬᠡᠬᠣᠲᠠ; Kökeqota; Hohhot 呼和浩特市; Hūhéhàotè Shì (Capital) (1501 / HET)	Yuquan District	ᠢᠤᠢ ᠴᠢᠤᠸᠠᠨ ᠲᠣᠭᠣᠷᠢᠭ	Iui čiuvan toγoriγ	Yuquan torig (Note: Native Mongolian translation does not exist.)	玉泉区	Yùquán Qū	150104	YQN
Hohhot city ᠬᠥᠬᠡᠬᠣᠲᠠ; Kökeqota; Hohhot 呼和浩特市; Hūhéhàotè Shì (Capital) (1501 / HET)	Saihan District	ᠰᠠᠶᠢᠬᠠᠨ ᠲᠣᠭᠣᠷᠢᠭ	Sayiqan toγoriγ	Saihan torig	赛罕区	Sàihǎn Qū	150105	SAQ
Hohhot city ᠬᠥᠬᠡᠬᠣᠲᠠ; Kökeqota; Hohhot 呼和浩特市; Hūhéhàotè Shì (Capital) (1501 / HET)	Tumed Left Banner	ᠲᠦᠮᠡᠳ ᠵᠡᠭᠦᠨ ᠬᠣᠰᠢᠭᠤ	Tümed Jegün qosiɣu	Tumed jun hoxu	土默特左旗	Tǔmòtè Zuǒqí	150121	TUZ
Hohhot city ᠬᠥᠬᠡᠬᠣᠲᠠ; Kökeqota; Hohhot 呼和浩特市; Hūhéhàotè Shì (Capital) (1501 / HET)	Togtoh County	ᠲᠣᠭᠲᠠᠬᠤ ᠰᠢᠶᠠᠨ	Toɣtaqu siyan	Togtoh xan	托克托县	Tuōkètuō Xiàn	150122	TOG
Hohhot city ᠬᠥᠬᠡᠬᠣᠲᠠ; Kökeqota; Hohhot 呼和浩特市; Hūhéhàotè Shì (Capital) (1501 / HET)	Horinger County	ᠬᠣᠷᠢᠨ ᠭᠡᠷ ᠰᠢᠶᠠᠨ	Qorin Ger siyan	Horin ger xan	和林格尔县	Hélíngé'ěr Xiàn	150123	HOR
Hohhot city ᠬᠥᠬᠡᠬᠣᠲᠠ; Kökeqota; Hohhot 呼和浩特市; Hūhéhàotè Shì (Capital) (1501 / HET)	Qingshuihe County	ᠴᠢᠩ ᠱᠦᠢ ᠾᠧ ᠰᠢᠶᠠᠨ	Čiŋ šüi hė siyan	Qingshuihe xan	清水河县	Qīngshuǐhé Xiàn	150124	QSH
Hohhot city ᠬᠥᠬᠡᠬᠣᠲᠠ; Kökeqota; Hohhot 呼和浩特市; Hūhéhàotè Shì (Capital) (1501 / HET)	Wuchuan County	ᠦᠴᠤᠸᠠᠨ ᠰᠢᠶᠠᠨ	Üčuvan siyan	Wuchuan xan	武川县	Wǔchuān Xiàn	150125	WCX
Baotou city ᠪᠤᠭᠤᠲᠤ ᠬᠣᠲᠠ; Buɣutu qota Bugt hot 包头市; Bāotóu Shì (1502 / BTS)	Donghe District	ᠳᠦᠩᠾᠧ ᠲᠣᠭᠣᠷᠢᠭ	Düŋhė toγoriγ	Donghe torig	东河区	Dōnghé Qū	150202	DHE
Baotou city ᠪᠤᠭᠤᠲᠤ ᠬᠣᠲᠠ; Buɣutu qota Bugt hot 包头市; Bāotóu Shì (1502 / BTS)	Hondlon District	ᠬᠥᠨᠳᠡᠯᠡᠨ ᠲᠣᠭᠣᠷᠢᠭ	Köndelen toγoriγ	Hondlon torig	昆都仑区	Kūndūlún Qū	150203	HDB
Baotou city ᠪᠤᠭᠤᠲᠤ ᠬᠣᠲᠠ; Buɣutu qota Bugt hot 包头市; Bāotóu Shì (1502 / BTS)	Qingshan District	ᠴᠢᠩᠱᠠᠨ ᠲᠣᠭᠣᠷᠢᠭ	Čiŋšan toγoriγ	Qingshan torig	青山区	Qīngshān Qū	150204	QSB
Baotou city ᠪᠤᠭᠤᠲᠤ ᠬᠣᠲᠠ; Buɣutu qota Bugt hot 包头市; Bāotóu Shì (1502 / BTS)	Shiguai District	ᠰᠢᠭᠤᠶᠢᠲᠤ ᠲᠣᠭᠣᠷᠢᠭ	Siɣuyitu toγoriγ	Siguyitu torig	石拐区	Shíguǎi Qū	150205	XIT
Baotou city ᠪᠤᠭᠤᠲᠤ ᠬᠣᠲᠠ; Buɣutu qota Bugt hot 包头市; Bāotóu Shì (1502 / BTS)	Bayan Obo Mining District	ᠪᠠᠶᠠᠨ ᠣᠪᠣᠭ᠋᠎ᠠ ᠠᠭᠤᠷᠬᠠᠢ ᠶᠢᠨ ᠲᠣᠭᠣᠷᠢᠭ	Bayan Oboɣ-a Aɣurqai-yin toγoriγ	Bayan obo urhain torig	白云鄂博矿区	Báiyún Èbó Kuàngqū	150206	BYK
Baotou city ᠪᠤᠭᠤᠲᠤ ᠬᠣᠲᠠ; Buɣutu qota Bugt hot 包头市; Bāotóu Shì (1502 / BTS)	Jiuyuan District	ᠵᠢᠦ ᠶᠤᠸᠠᠨ ᠲᠣᠭᠣᠷᠢᠭ	Jiü yuvan toγoriγ	Jiuyuan torig	九原区	Jiǔyuán Qū	150207	JYN
Baotou city ᠪᠤᠭᠤᠲᠤ ᠬᠣᠲᠠ; Buɣutu qota Bugt hot 包头市; Bāotóu Shì (1502 / BTS)	Tumed Right Banner	ᠲᠦᠮᠡᠳ ᠪᠠᠷᠠᠭᠤᠨ ᠬᠣᠰᠢᠭᠤ	Tümed Baraɣun qosiɣu	Tumed barun hoxu	土默特右旗	Tǔmòtè Yòuqí	150221	TUY
Baotou city ᠪᠤᠭᠤᠲᠤ ᠬᠣᠲᠠ; Buɣutu qota Bugt hot 包头市; Bāotóu Shì (1502 / BTS)	Guyang County	ᠭᠦᠶᠠᠩ ᠰᠢᠶᠠᠨ	Güyaŋ siyan	Guyang xan	固阳县	Gùyáng Xiàn	150222	GYM
Baotou city ᠪᠤᠭᠤᠲᠤ ᠬᠣᠲᠠ; Buɣutu qota Bugt hot 包头市; Bāotóu Shì (1502 / BTS)	Darhan Muminggan United Banner	ᠳᠠᠷᠬᠠᠨ ᠮᠤᠤᠮᠢᠩᠭ᠋ᠠᠨ ᠬᠣᠯᠪᠣᠭᠠᠲᠤ ᠬᠣᠰᠢᠭᠤ	Darqan Muumiŋɣan Qolboɣatu qosiɣu	Darhan muminggan holbot hoxu	达尔罕茂明安 联合旗	Dá'ěrhǎn Màomíng'ān; Liánhéqí	150223	DML
Wuhai city ᠦᠬᠠᠢ ᠬᠣᠲᠠ; Üqai qota Uhai hot 乌海市; Wūhǎi Shì (1503 / WHM)	Haibowan District	ᠬᠠᠶᠢᠷᠤᠪ ᠤᠨ ᠲᠣᠬᠣᠢ ᠲᠣᠭᠣᠷᠢᠭ	Qayirub-un Toqoi toγoriγ	Hairibin tohoi torig	海勃湾区	Hǎibówān Qū	150302	HBW
Wuhai city ᠦᠬᠠᠢ ᠬᠣᠲᠠ; Üqai qota Uhai hot 乌海市; Wūhǎi Shì (1503 / WHM)	Hainan District	ᠬᠠᠶᠢᠨᠠᠨ ᠲᠣᠭᠣᠷᠢᠭ	Qayinan toγoriγ	Hainan torig	海南区	Hǎinán Qū	150303	HNU
Wuhai city ᠦᠬᠠᠢ ᠬᠣᠲᠠ; Üqai qota Uhai hot 乌海市; Wūhǎi Shì (1503 / WHM)	Wuda District	ᠤᠳᠠ ᠲᠣᠭᠣᠷᠢᠭ	Uda toɣoriɣ	Uda torig	乌达区	Wūdá Qū	150304	UDQ
Chifeng city ᠤᠯᠠᠭᠠᠨᠬᠠᠳᠠ ᠬᠣᠲᠠ; Ulaɣanqada qota Ulanhad hot 赤峰市; Chìfēng Shì (1504 / CFS)	Hongshan District	ᠬᠦᠩ ᠱᠠᠨ ᠲᠣᠭᠣᠷᠢᠭ	Küŋ šan toγoriγ	Hongshan torig	红山区	Hóngshān Qū	150402	HSZ
Chifeng city ᠤᠯᠠᠭᠠᠨᠬᠠᠳᠠ ᠬᠣᠲᠠ; Ulaɣanqada qota Ulanhad hot 赤峰市; Chìfēng Shì (1504 / CFS)	Yuanbaoshan District	ᠶᠤᠸᠠᠨ ᠪᠣᠣ ᠱᠠᠨ ᠲᠣᠭᠣᠷᠢᠭ	Yuvan boo šan toγoriγ	Yuanbaoshan torig	元宝山区	Yuánbǎoshān Qū	150403	YBO
Chifeng city ᠤᠯᠠᠭᠠᠨᠬᠠᠳᠠ ᠬᠣᠲᠠ; Ulaɣanqada qota Ulanhad hot 赤峰市; Chìfēng Shì (1504 / CFS)	Songshan District	ᠰᠦᠩ ᠱᠠᠨ ᠲᠣᠭᠣᠷᠢᠭ	Süŋ šan toγoriγ	Songshan torig	松山区	Sōngshān Qū	150404	SSQ
Chifeng city ᠤᠯᠠᠭᠠᠨᠬᠠᠳᠠ ᠬᠣᠲᠠ; Ulaɣanqada qota Ulanhad hot 赤峰市; Chìfēng Shì (1504 / CFS)	Ar Horqin Banner	ᠠᠷᠤ ᠬᠣᠷᠴᠢᠨ ᠬᠣᠰᠢᠭᠤ	Aru Qorčin qosiɣu	Ar horqin hoxu	阿鲁科尔沁旗	Ālǔkē'ěrqìn Qí	150421	AHO
Chifeng city ᠤᠯᠠᠭᠠᠨᠬᠠᠳᠠ ᠬᠣᠲᠠ; Ulaɣanqada qota Ulanhad hot 赤峰市; Chìfēng Shì (1504 / CFS)	Bairin Left Banner	ᠪᠠᠭᠠᠷᠢᠨ ᠵᠡᠭᠦᠨ ᠬᠣᠰᠢᠭᠤ	Baɣarin Jegün qosiɣu	Bairin jun hoxu	巴林左旗	Bālín Zuǒqí	150422	BAZ
Chifeng city ᠤᠯᠠᠭᠠᠨᠬᠠᠳᠠ ᠬᠣᠲᠠ; Ulaɣanqada qota Ulanhad hot 赤峰市; Chìfēng Shì (1504 / CFS)	Bairin Right Banner	ᠪᠠᠭᠠᠷᠢᠨ ᠪᠠᠷᠠᠭᠤᠨ ᠬᠣᠰᠢᠭᠤ	Baɣarin Baraɣun qosiɣu	Bairin barun hoxu	巴林右旗	Bālín Yòuqí	150423	BAY
Chifeng city ᠤᠯᠠᠭᠠᠨᠬᠠᠳᠠ ᠬᠣᠲᠠ; Ulaɣanqada qota Ulanhad hot 赤峰市; Chìfēng Shì (1504 / CFS)	Linxi County	ᠯᠢᠨᠰᠢ ᠰᠢᠶᠠᠨ	Linsi siyan	Linxi xan	林西县	Línxī Xiàn	150424	LXM
Chifeng city ᠤᠯᠠᠭᠠᠨᠬᠠᠳᠠ ᠬᠣᠲᠠ; Ulaɣanqada qota Ulanhad hot 赤峰市; Chìfēng Shì (1504 / CFS)	Hexigten Banner	ᠬᠡᠰᠢᠭᠲᠡᠨ ᠬᠣᠰᠢᠭᠤ	Kesigten qosiɣu	Hexigten hoxu	克什克腾旗	Kèshíkèténg Qí	150425	HXT
Chifeng city ᠤᠯᠠᠭᠠᠨᠬᠠᠳᠠ ᠬᠣᠲᠠ; Ulaɣanqada qota Ulanhad hot 赤峰市; Chìfēng Shì (1504 / CFS)	Ongniud Banner	ᠣᠩᠨᠢᠭᠤᠳ ᠬᠣᠰᠢᠭᠤ	Oŋniɣud qosiɣu	Ongniud hoxu	翁牛特旗	Wēngniútè Qí	150426	ONG
Chifeng city ᠤᠯᠠᠭᠠᠨᠬᠠᠳᠠ ᠬᠣᠲᠠ; Ulaɣanqada qota Ulanhad hot 赤峰市; Chìfēng Shì (1504 / CFS)	Harqin Banner	ᠬᠠᠷᠠᠴᠢᠨ ᠬᠣᠰᠢᠭᠤ	Qaračin qosiɣu	Harqin hoxu	喀喇沁旗	Kālāqìn Qí	150428	HAR
Chifeng city ᠤᠯᠠᠭᠠᠨᠬᠠᠳᠠ ᠬᠣᠲᠠ; Ulaɣanqada qota Ulanhad hot 赤峰市; Chìfēng Shì (1504 / CFS)	Ningcheng County	ᠨᠢᠩᠴᠧᠩ ᠰᠢᠶᠠᠨ	Niŋčėŋ siyan	Ningcheng xan	宁城县	Níngchéng Xiàn	150429	NCH
Chifeng city ᠤᠯᠠᠭᠠᠨᠬᠠᠳᠠ ᠬᠣᠲᠠ; Ulaɣanqada qota Ulanhad hot 赤峰市; Chìfēng Shì (1504 / CFS)	Aohan Banner	ᠠᠣᠬᠠᠨ ᠬᠣᠰᠢᠭᠤ	Aoqan qosiɣu	Aohan hoxu	敖汉旗	Áohàn Qí	150430	AHN
Tongliao city ᠲᠦᠩᠯᠢᠶᠣᠤ ᠬᠣᠲᠠ; Tüŋliyou qota Tungliyo hot 通辽市; Tōngliáo Shì (1505 / TLO)	Horqin District	ᠬᠣᠷᠴᠢᠨ ᠲᠣᠭᠣᠷᠢᠭ	Qorčin toγoriγ	Horqin torig	科尔沁区	Kē'ěrqìn Qū	150502	HQN
Tongliao city ᠲᠦᠩᠯᠢᠶᠣᠤ ᠬᠣᠲᠠ; Tüŋliyou qota Tungliyo hot 通辽市; Tōngliáo Shì (1505 / TLO)	Horqin Left Middle Banner	ᠬᠣᠷᠴᠢᠨ ᠵᠡᠭᠦᠨ ᠭᠠᠷᠤᠨ ᠳᠤᠮᠳᠠᠳᠤ ᠬᠣᠰᠢᠭᠤ	Qorčin Jegün Ɣarun Dumdadu qosiɣu	Horqin jun garun dundad hoxu	科尔沁左翼中旗	Kē'ěrqìn Zuǒyì Zhōngqí	150521	HZZ
Tongliao city ᠲᠦᠩᠯᠢᠶᠣᠤ ᠬᠣᠲᠠ; Tüŋliyou qota Tungliyo hot 通辽市; Tōngliáo Shì (1505 / TLO)	Horqin Left Rear Banner	ᠬᠣᠷᠴᠢᠨ ᠵᠡᠭᠦᠨ ᠭᠠᠷᠤᠨ ᠬᠣᠶᠢᠲᠤ ᠬᠣᠰᠢᠭᠤ	Qorčin Jegün Ɣarun Qoyitu qosiɣu	Horqin jun garun hoit hoxu	科尔沁左翼后旗	Kē'ěrqìn Zuǒyì Hòuqí	150522	HZI
Tongliao city ᠲᠦᠩᠯᠢᠶᠣᠤ ᠬᠣᠲᠠ; Tüŋliyou qota Tungliyo hot 通辽市; Tōngliáo Shì (1505 / TLO)	Kailu County	ᠺᠠᠶᠢᠯᠦ ᠰᠢᠶᠠᠨ	Ḵayilü siyan	Kailu xan	开鲁县	Kāilǔ Xiàn	150523	KLU
Tongliao city ᠲᠦᠩᠯᠢᠶᠣᠤ ᠬᠣᠲᠠ; Tüŋliyou qota Tungliyo hot 通辽市; Tōngliáo Shì (1505 / TLO)	Hure Banner	ᠬᠦᠷᠢᠶ᠎ᠡ ᠬᠣᠰᠢᠭᠤ	Küriy-e qosiɣu	Hure hoxu	库伦旗	Kùlún Qí	150524	HUR
Tongliao city ᠲᠦᠩᠯᠢᠶᠣᠤ ᠬᠣᠲᠠ; Tüŋliyou qota Tungliyo hot 通辽市; Tōngliáo Shì (1505 / TLO)	Naiman Banner	ᠨᠠᠢᠮᠠᠨ ᠬᠣᠰᠢᠭᠤ	Naiman qosiɣu	Naiman hoxu	奈曼旗	Nàimàn Qí	150525	NMN
Tongliao city ᠲᠦᠩᠯᠢᠶᠣᠤ ᠬᠣᠲᠠ; Tüŋliyou qota Tungliyo hot 通辽市; Tōngliáo Shì (1505 / TLO)	Jarud Banner	ᠵᠠᠷᠤᠳ ᠬᠣᠰᠢᠭᠤ	Jarud qosiɣu	Jarud hoxu	扎鲁特旗	Zālǔtè Qí	150526	JAR
Tongliao city ᠲᠦᠩᠯᠢᠶᠣᠤ ᠬᠣᠲᠠ; Tüŋliyou qota Tungliyo hot 通辽市; Tōngliáo Shì (1505 / TLO)	Holingol city	ᠬᠣᠣᠯᠢᠨ ᠭᠣᠣᠯ ᠬᠣᠲᠠ	Qoolin Ɣool qota	Holin gol hot	霍林郭勒市	Huòlínguōlè Shì	150581	HOL
Ordos city ᠣᠷᠳᠣᠰ ᠬᠣᠲᠠ; Ordos qota Ordos hot 鄂尔多斯市; È'ěrduōsī Shì (1506 / ODS)	Dongsheng District	ᠳ᠋ᠦᠩᠱᠧᠩ ᠲᠣᠭᠣᠷᠢᠭ	Düŋšėŋ toγoriγ	Dongsheng torig	东胜区	Dōngshèng Qū	150602	DNS
Ordos city ᠣᠷᠳᠣᠰ ᠬᠣᠲᠠ; Ordos qota Ordos hot 鄂尔多斯市; È'ěrduōsī Shì (1506 / ODS)	Kangbashi District	ᠬᠢᠶ᠎ᠠ ᠪᠠᠭᠰᠢ ᠲᠣᠭᠣᠷᠢᠭ	Kiy-a Baγsi toγoriγ	Hiya Bagsi dûgûrig	康巴什区	Kāngbāshí Qū	150603	KBS
Ordos city ᠣᠷᠳᠣᠰ ᠬᠣᠲᠠ; Ordos qota Ordos hot 鄂尔多斯市; È'ěrduōsī Shì (1506 / ODS)	Dalad Banner	ᠳᠠᠯᠠᠳ ᠬᠣᠰᠢᠭᠤ	Dalad qosiɣu	Dalad hoxu	达拉特旗	Dálātè Qí	150621	DLA
Ordos city ᠣᠷᠳᠣᠰ ᠬᠣᠲᠠ; Ordos qota Ordos hot 鄂尔多斯市; È'ěrduōsī Shì (1506 / ODS)	Jungar Banner	ᠵᠡᠭᠦᠨᠭᠠᠷ ᠬᠣᠰᠢᠭᠤ	Jegünɣar qosiɣu	Jungar hoxu	准格尔旗	Zhǔngé'ěr Qí	150622	JUN
Ordos city ᠣᠷᠳᠣᠰ ᠬᠣᠲᠠ; Ordos qota Ordos hot 鄂尔多斯市; È'ěrduōsī Shì (1506 / ODS)	Otog Front Banner	ᠣᠲᠣᠭ ᠤᠨ ᠡᠮᠦᠨᠡᠳᠦ ᠬᠣᠰᠢᠭᠤ	Otoɣ-un Emünedü qosiɣu	Otog omnod hoxu	鄂托克前旗	Ètuōkè Qiánqí	150623	OTQ
Ordos city ᠣᠷᠳᠣᠰ ᠬᠣᠲᠠ; Ordos qota Ordos hot 鄂尔多斯市; È'ěrduōsī Shì (1506 / ODS)	Otog Banner	ᠣᠲᠣᠭ ᠬᠣᠰᠢᠭᠤ	Otoɣ qosiɣu	Otog hoxu	鄂托克旗	Ètuōkè Qí	150624	OTO
Ordos city ᠣᠷᠳᠣᠰ ᠬᠣᠲᠠ; Ordos qota Ordos hot 鄂尔多斯市; È'ěrduōsī Shì (1506 / ODS)	Hanggin Banner	ᠬᠠᠩᠭᠢᠨ ᠬᠣᠰᠢᠭᠤ	Qaŋɣin qosiɣu	Hanggin hoxu	杭锦旗	Hángjǐn Qí	150625	HAQ
Ordos city ᠣᠷᠳᠣᠰ ᠬᠣᠲᠠ; Ordos qota Ordos hot 鄂尔多斯市; È'ěrduōsī Shì (1506 / ODS)	Uxin Banner	ᠦᠦᠰᠢᠨ ᠬᠣᠰᠢᠭᠤ	Üüsin qosiɣu	Uxin hoxu	乌审旗	Wūshěn Qí	150626	UXI
Ordos city ᠣᠷᠳᠣᠰ ᠬᠣᠲᠠ; Ordos qota Ordos hot 鄂尔多斯市; È'ěrduōsī Shì (1506 / ODS)	Ejin Horo Banner	ᠡᠵᠢᠨ ᠬᠣᠷᠣᠭ᠎ᠠ ᠬᠣᠰᠢᠭᠤ	Ejin Qoroɣ-a qosiɣu	Ejin horo hoxu	伊金霍洛旗	Yījīnhuòluò Qí	150627	EHO
Hulunbuir city ᠬᠥᠯᠥᠨ ᠪᠤᠶᠢᠷ ᠬᠣᠲᠠ; Kölön Buyir qota Hulun buir hot 呼伦贝尔市; Hūlúnbèi'ěr Shì (1507 / HBR)	Hailar District	ᠬᠠᠶᠢᠯᠠᠷ ᠲᠣᠭᠣᠷᠢᠭ	Qayilar toγoriγ	Hailar torig	海拉尔区	Hǎilā'ěr Qū	150702	HLR
Hulunbuir city ᠬᠥᠯᠥᠨ ᠪᠤᠶᠢᠷ ᠬᠣᠲᠠ; Kölön Buyir qota Hulun buir hot 呼伦贝尔市; Hūlúnbèi'ěr Shì (1507 / HBR)	Jalainur District	ᠵᠠᠯᠠᠢᠳᠨᠠᠭᠤᠷ ᠲᠣᠭᠣᠷᠢᠭ	Jalainaɣur toγoriγ	Zalainur torig	扎赉诺尔区	Zhālàinuò'ěr Qū	150703	ZLN
Hulunbuir city ᠬᠥᠯᠥᠨ ᠪᠤᠶᠢᠷ ᠬᠣᠲᠠ; Kölön Buyir qota Hulun buir hot 呼伦贝尔市; Hūlúnbèi'ěr Shì (1507 / HBR)	Arun Banner	ᠠᠷᠤᠨ ᠬᠣᠰᠢᠭᠤ	Arun qosiɣu	Arun hoxu	阿荣旗	Āróng Qí	150721	ARU
Hulunbuir city ᠬᠥᠯᠥᠨ ᠪᠤᠶᠢᠷ ᠬᠣᠲᠠ; Kölön Buyir qota Hulun buir hot 呼伦贝尔市; Hūlúnbèi'ěr Shì (1507 / HBR)	Morin'dawa Banner (Note: Conventional name: Morin'dawa Daur Autonomous Banner; Mongolian: ᠮᠣᠷᠢᠨ ᠳᠠᠪᠠᠭ᠎ᠠ ᠳᠠᠭᠤᠷ ᠥᠪᠡᠷᠲᠡᠭᠡᠨ ᠵᠠᠰᠠᠬᠤ ᠬᠣᠰᠢᠭᠤ; Transliteration: Morin Dabaɣ-a Daɣur öbertegen jasaqu qosiɣu; SASM/GNC (broad): Morin'dawa daur orto jasah hoxu; Chinese: 莫力达瓦达斡尔族自治旗; pinyin: Mòlìdáwǎ Dáwò'ěrzú Zìzhìqí)	ᠮᠣᠷᠢᠨ ᠳᠠᠪᠠᠭ᠎ᠠ ᠬᠣᠰᠢᠭᠤ	Morin dabaɣ-a qosiɣu	Morin dawa hoxu	莫力达瓦旗	Mòlìdáwǎ Qí	150722	MDD
Hulunbuir city ᠬᠥᠯᠥᠨ ᠪᠤᠶᠢᠷ ᠬᠣᠲᠠ; Kölön Buyir qota Hulun buir hot 呼伦贝尔市; Hūlúnbèi'ěr Shì (1507 / HBR)	Oroqen Banner (Note: Conventional name: Oroqen Autonomous Banner; Mongolian: ᠣᠷᠴᠣᠨ ᠤ ᠥᠪᠡᠷᠲᠡᠭᠡᠨ ᠵᠠᠰᠠᠬᠤ ᠬᠣᠰᠢᠭᠤ; Transliteration: Orčon-u öbertegen jasaqu qosiɣu; SASM/GNC (broad): Oroqen orto jasah hoxu; Chinese: 鄂伦春自治旗; pinyin: Èlúnchūn Zìzhìqí)	ᠣᠷᠴᠣᠨ ᠤ ᠬᠣᠰᠢᠭᠤ	Orčon-u qosiɣu	Oroqen hoxu	鄂伦春旗	Èlúnchūn Qí	150723	ORO
Hulunbuir city ᠬᠥᠯᠥᠨ ᠪᠤᠶᠢᠷ ᠬᠣᠲᠠ; Kölön Buyir qota Hulun buir hot 呼伦贝尔市; Hūlúnbèi'ěr Shì (1507 / HBR)	Evenk Banner (Note: Conventional name: Evenk Autonomous Banner; Mongolian: ᠡᠸᠡᠩᠬᠢ ᠥᠪᠡᠷᠲᠡᠭᠡᠨ ᠵᠠᠰᠠᠬᠤ ᠬᠣᠰᠢᠭᠤ; Transliteration: Eveŋki öbertegen jasaqu qosiɣu; SASM/GNC (broad): Ewenki orto jasah hoxu; Chinese: 鄂温克族自治旗; pinyin: Èwēnkèzú Zìzhìqí)	ᠡᠸᠡᠩᠬᠢ ᠬᠣᠰᠢᠭᠤ	Eveŋki qosiɣu	Ewenki hoxu	鄂温克旗	Èwēnkè Qí	150724	EWE
Hulunbuir city ᠬᠥᠯᠥᠨ ᠪᠤᠶᠢᠷ ᠬᠣᠲᠠ; Kölön Buyir qota Hulun buir hot 呼伦贝尔市; Hūlúnbèi'ěr Shì (1507 / HBR)	Old Barag Banner	ᠬᠠᠭᠤᠴᠢᠨ ᠪᠠᠷᠭᠤ ᠬᠣᠰᠢᠭᠤ	Qaɣučin Barɣu qosiɣu	Huqin barag hoxu	陈巴尔虎旗	Chénbā'ěrhǔ Qí	150725	CBA
Hulunbuir city ᠬᠥᠯᠥᠨ ᠪᠤᠶᠢᠷ ᠬᠣᠲᠠ; Kölön Buyir qota Hulun buir hot 呼伦贝尔市; Hūlúnbèi'ěr Shì (1507 / HBR)	New Barag Left Banner	ᠰᠢᠨ᠎ᠡ ᠪᠠᠷᠭᠤ ᠵᠡᠭᠦᠨ ᠬᠣᠰᠢᠭᠤ	Sin-e Barɣu Jegün qosiɣu	Xin barag jun hoxu	新巴尔虎左旗	Xīnbā'ěrhǔ Zuǒqí	150726	XBZ
Hulunbuir city ᠬᠥᠯᠥᠨ ᠪᠤᠶᠢᠷ ᠬᠣᠲᠠ; Kölön Buyir qota Hulun buir hot 呼伦贝尔市; Hūlúnbèi'ěr Shì (1507 / HBR)	New Barag Right Banner	ᠰᠢᠨ᠎ᠡ ᠪᠠᠷᠭᠤ ᠪᠠᠷᠠᠭᠤᠨ ᠬᠣᠰᠢᠭᠤ	Sin-e Barɣu Baraɣun qosiɣu	Xin barag barun hoxu	新巴尔虎右旗	Xīnbā'ěrhǔ Yòuqí	150727	XBY
Hulunbuir city ᠬᠥᠯᠥᠨ ᠪᠤᠶᠢᠷ ᠬᠣᠲᠠ; Kölön Buyir qota Hulun buir hot 呼伦贝尔市; Hūlúnbèi'ěr Shì (1507 / HBR)	Manzhouli city	ᠮᠠᠨᠵᠤᠤᠷ ᠬᠣᠲᠠ	Manjuur qota	Manzhouli hot	满洲里市	Mǎnzhōulǐ Shì	150781	MLX
Hulunbuir city ᠬᠥᠯᠥᠨ ᠪᠤᠶᠢᠷ ᠬᠣᠲᠠ; Kölön Buyir qota Hulun buir hot 呼伦贝尔市; Hūlúnbèi'ěr Shì (1507 / HBR)	Yakeshi city	ᠶᠠᠭᠰᠢ ᠬᠣᠲᠠ	Yaɣsi qota	Yakeshi hot	牙克石市	Yákèshí Shì	150782	YKS
Hulunbuir city ᠬᠥᠯᠥᠨ ᠪᠤᠶᠢᠷ ᠬᠣᠲᠠ; Kölön Buyir qota Hulun buir hot 呼伦贝尔市; Hūlúnbèi'ěr Shì (1507 / HBR)	Zalantun city	ᠵᠠᠯᠠᠨ ᠠᠶᠢᠯ ᠬᠣᠲᠠ	Jalan Ayil qota	Zalan tun hot	扎兰屯市	Zhālántún Shì	150783	ZLT
Hulunbuir city ᠬᠥᠯᠥᠨ ᠪᠤᠶᠢᠷ ᠬᠣᠲᠠ; Kölön Buyir qota Hulun buir hot 呼伦贝尔市; Hūlúnbèi'ěr Shì (1507 / HBR)	Ergun city	ᠡᠷᠭᠦᠨ᠎ᠡ ᠬᠣᠲᠠ	Ergün-e qota	Ergun hot	额尔古纳市	É'ěrgǔnà Shì	150784	ERG
Hulunbuir city ᠬᠥᠯᠥᠨ ᠪᠤᠶᠢᠷ ᠬᠣᠲᠠ; Kölön Buyir qota Hulun buir hot 呼伦贝尔市; Hūlúnbèi'ěr Shì (1507 / HBR)	Genhe city	ᠭᠡᠭᠡᠨ ᠭᠣᠣᠯ ᠬᠣᠲᠠ	Gegen Ɣool qota	Gen gol hot	根河市	Gēnhé Shì	150785	GHS
Bayannur city ᠪᠠᠶᠠᠨᠨᠠᠭᠤᠷ ᠬᠣᠲᠠ; Bayannaɣur qota Bayannur hot 巴彦淖尔市; Bāyànnào'ěr Shì (1508 / BYR)	Linhe District	ᠯᠢᠨᠾᠧ ᠲᠣᠭᠣᠷᠢᠭ	Linhė toγoriγ	Linhe torig	临河区	Línhé Qū	150802	LNH
Bayannur city ᠪᠠᠶᠠᠨᠨᠠᠭᠤᠷ ᠬᠣᠲᠠ; Bayannaɣur qota Bayannur hot 巴彦淖尔市; Bāyànnào'ěr Shì (1508 / BYR)	Wuyuan County	ᠦᠶᠤᠸᠠᠨ ᠰᠢᠶᠠᠨ	Üyuvan siyan	Wuyuan xan	五原县	Wǔyuán Xiàn	150821	WYM
Bayannur city ᠪᠠᠶᠠᠨᠨᠠᠭᠤᠷ ᠬᠣᠲᠠ; Bayannaɣur qota Bayannur hot 巴彦淖尔市; Bāyànnào'ěr Shì (1508 / BYR)	Dengkou County	ᠳ᠋ᠧᠩᠺᠧᠦ ᠰᠢᠶᠠᠨ	Dėŋḵėü siyan	Dengkou xan	磴口县	Dèngkǒu Xiàn	150822	DKO
Bayannur city ᠪᠠᠶᠠᠨᠨᠠᠭᠤᠷ ᠬᠣᠲᠠ; Bayannaɣur qota Bayannur hot 巴彦淖尔市; Bāyànnào'ěr Shì (1508 / BYR)	Urad Front Banner	ᠤᠷᠠᠳ ᠤᠨ ᠡᠮᠦᠨᠡᠳᠦ ᠬᠣᠰᠢᠭᠤ	Urad-un Emünedü qosiɣu	Urad omnod hoxu	乌拉特前旗	Wūlātè Qiánqí	150823	URQ
Bayannur city ᠪᠠᠶᠠᠨᠨᠠᠭᠤᠷ ᠬᠣᠲᠠ; Bayannaɣur qota Bayannur hot 巴彦淖尔市; Bāyànnào'ěr Shì (1508 / BYR)	Urad Middle Banner	ᠤᠷᠠᠳ ᠤᠨ ᠳᠤᠮᠳᠠᠳᠤ ᠬᠣᠰᠢᠭᠤ	Urad-un Dumdadu qosiɣu	Urad dundad hoxu	乌拉特中旗	Wūlātè Zhōngqí	150824	URZ
Bayannur city ᠪᠠᠶᠠᠨᠨᠠᠭᠤᠷ ᠬᠣᠲᠠ; Bayannaɣur qota Bayannur hot 巴彦淖尔市; Bāyànnào'ěr Shì (1508 / BYR)	Urad Rear Banner	ᠤᠷᠠᠳ ᠤᠨ ᠬᠣᠶᠢᠲᠤ ᠬᠣᠰᠢᠭᠤ	Urad-un Qoyitu qosiɣu	Urad hoit hoxu	乌拉特后旗	Wūlātè Hòuqí	150825	URH
Bayannur city ᠪᠠᠶᠠᠨᠨᠠᠭᠤᠷ ᠬᠣᠲᠠ; Bayannaɣur qota Bayannur hot 巴彦淖尔市; Bāyànnào'ěr Shì (1508 / BYR)	Hanggin Rear Banner	ᠬᠠᠩᠭᠢᠨ ᠬᠣᠶᠢᠲᠤ ᠬᠣᠰᠢᠭᠤ	Qaŋɣin Qoyitu qosiɣu	Hanggin hoit hoxu	杭锦后旗	Hángjǐn Hòuqí	150826	HAH
Ulanqab city ᠤᠯᠠᠭᠠᠨᠴᠠᠪ ᠬᠣᠲᠠ; Ulaɣančab qota Ulanqab hot 乌兰察布市; Wūlánchábù Shì (1509 / ULS)	Jining District	ᠵᠢᠨᠢᠩ ᠲᠣᠭᠣᠷᠢᠭ	Jiniŋ toγoriγ	Jining torig	集宁区	Jíníng Qū	150902	JIN
Ulanqab city ᠤᠯᠠᠭᠠᠨᠴᠠᠪ ᠬᠣᠲᠠ; Ulaɣančab qota Ulanqab hot 乌兰察布市; Wūlánchábù Shì (1509 / ULS)	Zhuozi County	ᠵᠦᠸᠧᠽᠢ ᠰᠢᠶᠠᠨ	Jüvėǳi siyan	Zhuozi xan	卓资县	Zhuózī Xiàn	150921	ZUZ
Ulanqab city ᠤᠯᠠᠭᠠᠨᠴᠠᠪ ᠬᠣᠲᠠ; Ulaɣančab qota Ulanqab hot 乌兰察布市; Wūlánchábù Shì (1509 / ULS)	Huade County	ᠬᠤᠸᠠᠳᠧ ᠰᠢᠶᠠᠨ	Quvadė siyan	Huade xan	化德县	Huàdé Xiàn	150922	HDE
Ulanqab city ᠤᠯᠠᠭᠠᠨᠴᠠᠪ ᠬᠣᠲᠠ; Ulaɣančab qota Ulanqab hot 乌兰察布市; Wūlánchábù Shì (1509 / ULS)	Shangdu County	ᠱᠠᠩᠳᠤ ᠰᠢᠶᠠᠨ	Šaŋdu siyan	Shangdu xan	商都县	Shāngdū Xiàn	150923	SDX
Ulanqab city ᠤᠯᠠᠭᠠᠨᠴᠠᠪ ᠬᠣᠲᠠ; Ulaɣančab qota Ulanqab hot 乌兰察布市; Wūlánchábù Shì (1509 / ULS)	Xinghe County	ᠰᠢᠩᠾᠧ ᠰᠢᠶᠠᠨ	Siŋhė siyan	Xinghe xan	兴和县	Xīnghé Xiàn	150924	XHM
Ulanqab city ᠤᠯᠠᠭᠠᠨᠴᠠᠪ ᠬᠣᠲᠠ; Ulaɣančab qota Ulanqab hot 乌兰察布市; Wūlánchábù Shì (1509 / ULS)	Liangcheng County	ᠯᠢᠶᠠᠩᠴᠠᠩ ᠰᠢᠶᠠᠨ	Liyaŋčaŋ siyan	Liangcheng xan	凉城县	Liángchéng Xiàn	150925	LCM
Ulanqab city ᠤᠯᠠᠭᠠᠨᠴᠠᠪ ᠬᠣᠲᠠ; Ulaɣančab qota Ulanqab hot 乌兰察布市; Wūlánchábù Shì (1509 / ULS)	Qahar Right Front Banner	ᠴᠠᠬᠠᠷ ᠪᠠᠷᠠᠭᠤᠨ ᠭᠠᠷᠤᠨ ᠡᠮᠦᠨᠡᠳᠦ ᠬᠣᠰᠢᠭᠤ	Čaqar Baraɣun Ɣarun Emünedü qosiɣu	Qahar barun garun omnod hoxu	察哈尔右翼前旗	Cháhā'ěr Yòuyì Qiánqí	150926	QYM
Ulanqab city ᠤᠯᠠᠭᠠᠨᠴᠠᠪ ᠬᠣᠲᠠ; Ulaɣančab qota Ulanqab hot 乌兰察布市; Wūlánchábù Shì (1509 / ULS)	Qahar Right Middle Banner	ᠴᠠᠬᠠᠷ ᠪᠠᠷᠠᠭᠤᠨ ᠭᠠᠷᠤᠨ ᠳᠤᠮᠳᠠᠳᠤ ᠬᠣᠰᠢᠭᠤ	Čaqar Baraɣun Ɣarun Dumdadu qosiɣu	Qahar barun garun dundad hoxu	察哈尔右翼中旗	Cháhā'ěr Yòuyì Zhōngqí	150927	QYZ
Ulanqab city ᠤᠯᠠᠭᠠᠨᠴᠠᠪ ᠬᠣᠲᠠ; Ulaɣančab qota Ulanqab hot 乌兰察布市; Wūlánchábù Shì (1509 / ULS)	Qahar Right Rear Banner	ᠴᠠᠬᠠᠷ ᠪᠠᠷᠠᠭᠤᠨ ᠭᠠᠷᠤᠨ ᠬᠣᠶᠢᠲᠤ ᠬᠣᠰᠢᠭᠤ	Čaqar Baraɣun Ɣarun Qoyitu qosiɣu	Qahar barun garun hoit hoxu	察哈尔右翼后旗	Cháhā'ěr Yòuyì Hòuqí	150928	QYH
Ulanqab city ᠤᠯᠠᠭᠠᠨᠴᠠᠪ ᠬᠣᠲᠠ; Ulaɣančab qota Ulanqab hot 乌兰察布市; Wūlánchábù Shì (1509 / ULS)	Dorbod Banner	ᠳᠥᠷᠪᠡᠳ ᠬᠣᠰᠢᠭᠤ	Dörbed qosiɣu	Dorbod hoxu	四子王旗	Sìzǐwáng Qí	150929	DOR
Ulanqab city ᠤᠯᠠᠭᠠᠨᠴᠠᠪ ᠬᠣᠲᠠ; Ulaɣančab qota Ulanqab hot 乌兰察布市; Wūlánchábù Shì (1509 / ULS)	Fengzhen city	ᠹᠧᠩᠵᠧᠨ ᠬᠣᠲᠠ	Fėŋjėn qota	Fengzhen hot	丰镇市	Fēngzhèn Shì	150981	FZS
Hinggan League ᠬᠢᠩᠭ᠋ᠠᠨ ᠠᠢᠮᠠᠭ; Qiŋɣan ayimaɣ Hinggan aimag 兴安盟; Xīng'ān Méng (1522 / HIN)	Ulanhot city	ᠤᠯᠠᠭᠠᠨᠬᠣᠲᠠ	Ulaɣanqota	Ulanhot	乌兰浩特市	Wūlánhàotè Shì	152201	ULO
Hinggan League ᠬᠢᠩᠭ᠋ᠠᠨ ᠠᠢᠮᠠᠭ; Qiŋɣan ayimaɣ Hinggan aimag 兴安盟; Xīng'ān Méng (1522 / HIN)	Arxan city	ᠷᠠᠰᠢᠶᠠᠨ ᠬᠣᠲᠠ	Rasiyan qota	Arxan hot	阿尔山市	Ā'ěrshān Shì	152202	ARS
Hinggan League ᠬᠢᠩᠭ᠋ᠠᠨ ᠠᠢᠮᠠᠭ; Qiŋɣan ayimaɣ Hinggan aimag 兴安盟; Xīng'ān Méng (1522 / HIN)	Horqin Right Front Banner	ᠬᠣᠷᠴᠢᠨ ᠪᠠᠷᠠᠭᠤᠨ ᠭᠠᠷᠤᠨ ᠡᠮᠦᠨᠡᠳᠦ ᠬᠣᠰᠢᠭᠤ	Qorčin Baraɣun Ɣarun Emünedü qosiɣu	Horqin barun garun omnod hoxu	科尔沁右翼前旗	Kē'ěrqìn Yòuyì Qiánqí	152221	HYQ
Hinggan League ᠬᠢᠩᠭ᠋ᠠᠨ ᠠᠢᠮᠠᠭ; Qiŋɣan ayimaɣ Hinggan aimag 兴安盟; Xīng'ān Méng (1522 / HIN)	Horqin Right Middle Banner	ᠬᠣᠷᠴᠢᠨ ᠪᠠᠷᠠᠭᠤᠨ ᠭᠠᠷᠤᠨ ᠳᠤᠮᠳᠠᠳᠤ ᠬᠣᠰᠢᠭᠤ	Qorčin Baraɣun Ɣarun Dumdadu qosiɣu	Horqin barun garun dundad hoxu	科尔沁右翼中旗	Kē'ěrqìn Yòuyì Zhōngqí	152222	HYZ
Hinggan League ᠬᠢᠩᠭ᠋ᠠᠨ ᠠᠢᠮᠠᠭ; Qiŋɣan ayimaɣ Hinggan aimag 兴安盟; Xīng'ān Méng (1522 / HIN)	Jalaid Banner	ᠵᠠᠯᠠᠢᠳ ᠬᠣᠰᠢᠭᠤ	Jalaid qosiɣu	Jalaid hoxu	扎赉特旗	Zālàitè Qí	152223	JAL
Hinggan League ᠬᠢᠩᠭ᠋ᠠᠨ ᠠᠢᠮᠠᠭ; Qiŋɣan ayimaɣ Hinggan aimag 兴安盟; Xīng'ān Méng (1522 / HIN)	Tuquan County	ᠲᠦᠴᠢᠤᠸᠠᠨ ᠰᠢᠶᠠᠨ	Tüčiuvan siyan	Tuquan xan	突泉县	Tūquán Xiàn	152224	TUQ
Xilingol League ᠰᠢᠯᠢ ᠶᠢᠨ ᠭᠣᠣᠯ ᠠᠢᠮᠠᠭ; Sili-yin Ɣool ayimaɣ Xiliin gol aimag 锡林郭勒盟; Xīlínguōlè Méng (1525 / XGO)	Erenhot city	ᠡᠷᠢᠶᠡᠨ ᠬᠣᠲᠠ	Eriyen qota	Eren hot	二连浩特市	Èrliánhàotè Shì	152501	ERC
Xilingol League ᠰᠢᠯᠢ ᠶᠢᠨ ᠭᠣᠣᠯ ᠠᠢᠮᠠᠭ; Sili-yin Ɣool ayimaɣ Xiliin gol aimag 锡林郭勒盟; Xīlínguōlè Méng (1525 / XGO)	Xilinhot city	ᠰᠢᠯᠢ ᠶᠢᠨ ᠬᠣᠲᠠ	Sili-yin qota	Xiliin gol hot	锡林浩特市	Xīlínhàotè Shì	152502	XLI
Xilingol League ᠰᠢᠯᠢ ᠶᠢᠨ ᠭᠣᠣᠯ ᠠᠢᠮᠠᠭ; Sili-yin Ɣool ayimaɣ Xiliin gol aimag 锡林郭勒盟; Xīlínguōlè Méng (1525 / XGO)	Abag Banner	ᠠᠪᠠᠭ᠎ᠠ ᠬᠣᠰᠢᠭᠤ	Abaɣ-a qosiɣu	Abag hoxu	阿巴嘎旗	Ābāgā Qí	152522	ABG
Xilingol League ᠰᠢᠯᠢ ᠶᠢᠨ ᠭᠣᠣᠯ ᠠᠢᠮᠠᠭ; Sili-yin Ɣool ayimaɣ Xiliin gol aimag 锡林郭勒盟; Xīlínguōlè Méng (1525 / XGO)	Sonid Left Banner	ᠰᠥᠨᠡᠳ ᠵᠡᠭᠦᠨ ᠬᠣᠰᠢᠭᠤ	Söned Jegün qosiɣu	Sonid jun hoxu	苏尼特左旗	Sūnítè Zuǒqí	152523	SOZ
Xilingol League ᠰᠢᠯᠢ ᠶᠢᠨ ᠭᠣᠣᠯ ᠠᠢᠮᠠᠭ; Sili-yin Ɣool ayimaɣ Xiliin gol aimag 锡林郭勒盟; Xīlínguōlè Méng (1525 / XGO)	Sonid Right Banner	ᠰᠥᠨᠡᠳ ᠪᠠᠷᠠᠭᠤᠨ ᠬᠣᠰᠢᠭᠤ	Söned Baraɣun qosiɣu	Sonid barun hoxu	苏尼特右旗	Sūnítè Yòuqí	152524	SOY
Xilingol League ᠰᠢᠯᠢ ᠶᠢᠨ ᠭᠣᠣᠯ ᠠᠢᠮᠠᠭ; Sili-yin Ɣool ayimaɣ Xiliin gol aimag 锡林郭勒盟; Xīlínguōlè Méng (1525 / XGO)	East Ujimqin Banner	ᠵᠡᠭᠦᠨ ᠤᠵᠤᠮᠤᠴᠢᠨ ᠬᠣᠰᠢᠭᠤ	Jegün Ujumučin qosiɣu	Jun ujimqin hoxu	东乌珠穆沁旗	Dōngwūzhūmùqìn Qí	152525	DUJ
Xilingol League ᠰᠢᠯᠢ ᠶᠢᠨ ᠭᠣᠣᠯ ᠠᠢᠮᠠᠭ; Sili-yin Ɣool ayimaɣ Xiliin gol aimag 锡林郭勒盟; Xīlínguōlè Méng (1525 / XGO)	West Ujimqin Banner	ᠪᠠᠷᠠᠭᠤᠨ ᠤᠵᠤᠮᠤᠴᠢᠨ ᠬᠣᠰᠢᠭᠤ	Baraɣun Ujumučin qosiɣu	Barun ujimqin hoxu	西乌珠穆沁旗	Xīwūzhūmùqìn Qí	152526	XUJ
Xilingol League ᠰᠢᠯᠢ ᠶᠢᠨ ᠭᠣᠣᠯ ᠠᠢᠮᠠᠭ; Sili-yin Ɣool ayimaɣ Xiliin gol aimag 锡林郭勒盟; Xīlínguōlè Méng (1525 / XGO)	Taibus Banner	ᠲᠠᠶᠢᠫᠤᠰᠧ ᠬᠣᠰᠢᠭᠤ	Tayipusė qosiɣu	Taibus hoxu	太仆寺旗	Tàipúsì Qí	152527	TAB
Xilingol League ᠰᠢᠯᠢ ᠶᠢᠨ ᠭᠣᠣᠯ ᠠᠢᠮᠠᠭ; Sili-yin Ɣool ayimaɣ Xiliin gol aimag 锡林郭勒盟; Xīlínguōlè Méng (1525 / XGO)	Xianghuang Banner	ᠬᠥᠪᠡᠭᠡᠲᠦ ᠰᠢᠷ᠎ᠠ ᠬᠣᠰᠢᠭᠤ	Köbegetü Sir-a qosiɣu	Hobot xar hoxu	镶黄旗	Xiānghuáng Qí	152528	XHG
Xilingol League ᠰᠢᠯᠢ ᠶᠢᠨ ᠭᠣᠣᠯ ᠠᠢᠮᠠᠭ; Sili-yin Ɣool ayimaɣ Xiliin gol aimag 锡林郭勒盟; Xīlínguōlè Méng (1525 / XGO)	Zhengxiangbai Banner	ᠰᠢᠯᠤᠭᠤᠨ ᠬᠥᠪᠡᠭᠡᠲᠦ ᠴᠠᠭᠠᠨ ᠬᠣᠰᠢᠭᠤ	Siluɣun Köbegetü Čaɣan qosiɣu	Xulun hobot qagan hoxu	正镶白旗	Zhèngxiāngbái Qí	152529	ZXB
Xilingol League ᠰᠢᠯᠢ ᠶᠢᠨ ᠭᠣᠣᠯ ᠠᠢᠮᠠᠭ; Sili-yin Ɣool ayimaɣ Xiliin gol aimag 锡林郭勒盟; Xīlínguōlè Méng (1525 / XGO)	Zhenglan Banner	ᠰᠢᠯᠤᠭᠤᠨ ᠬᠥᠬᠡ ᠬᠣᠰᠢᠭᠤ	Siluɣun Köke qosiɣu	Xulun hoh hoxu	正蓝旗	Zhènglán Qí	152530	ZLM
Xilingol League ᠰᠢᠯᠢ ᠶᠢᠨ ᠭᠣᠣᠯ ᠠᠢᠮᠠᠭ; Sili-yin Ɣool ayimaɣ Xiliin gol aimag 锡林郭勒盟; Xīlínguōlè Méng (1525 / XGO)	Duolun County	ᠳᠣᠯᠣᠨᠨᠤᠤᠷ ᠰᠢᠶᠠᠨ	Dolonnuur siyan	Duolun xan	多伦县	Duōlún Xiàn	152531	DLM
Alxa League ᠠᠯᠠᠱᠠ ᠠᠢᠮᠠᠭ; Alaša ayimaɣ Alxa aimag 阿拉善盟; Ālāshàn Méng (1529 / ALM)	Alxa Left Banner	ᠠᠯᠠᠱᠠ ᠵᠡᠭᠦᠨ ᠬᠣᠰᠢᠭᠤ	Alaša Jegün qosiɣu	Alxa jun hoxu	阿拉善左旗	Ālāshàn Zuǒqí	152921	ALZ
Alxa League ᠠᠯᠠᠱᠠ ᠠᠢᠮᠠᠭ; Alaša ayimaɣ Alxa aimag 阿拉善盟; Ālāshàn Méng (1529 / ALM)	Alxa Right Banner	ᠠᠯᠠᠱᠠ ᠪᠠᠷᠠᠭᠤᠨ ᠬᠣᠰᠢᠭᠤ	Alaša Baraɣun qosiɣu	Alxa barun hoxu	阿拉善右旗	Ālāshàn Yòuqí	152922	ALY
Alxa League ᠠᠯᠠᠱᠠ ᠠᠢᠮᠠᠭ; Alaša ayimaɣ Alxa aimag 阿拉善盟; Ālāshàn Méng (1529 / ALM)	Ejin Banner	ᠡᠵᠡᠨ᠎ᠡ ᠬᠣᠰᠢᠭᠤ	Ejen-e qosiɣu	Ejin hoxu	额济纳旗	Éjìnà Qí	152923	EJI

== Recent changes in administrative divisions ==
Date	Before	After	Note	Reference
1970-10-03	parts of Ulanqab League	Hohhot (P-City)	transferred	
1970-10-03	↳ Tumed Left Banner	↳ Tumed Left Banner	transferred	
1970-10-03	↳ Togtoh County	↳ Togtoh County	transferred	
1970-10-03	parts of Ulanqab League	Baotou (P-City)	transferred	
1970-10-03	↳ Tumed Right Banner	↳ Tumed Right Banner	transferred	
1970-10-03	↳ Guyang County	↳ Guyang County	transferred	
1970-10-30	Urat Middle Rear United Banner	Chaoge Banner	established	
1975-08-30	parts of Bayannur League	Wuhai (P-City) city district	established	
1975-08-30	↳ Wuda (PC-City)	Wuhai (P-City) city district	disestablished	
1975-08-30	parts of Ih'ju League	Wuhai (P-City) city district	established	
1975-08-30	↳ Haibowan (PC-City)	Wuhai (P-City) city district	disestablished	
1976-12-13	parts of Qingshan District	Jianhua Kuang District	established	
1978-10-01	Hongqi District	Huimin District	renamed	
1979-05-30	parts of Heilongjiang Province	Inner Mongolia A.R.	provincial transferred	
1979-05-30	Hulunbuir League	Hulunbuir League	transferred	
1979-05-30	↳ Butha Banner	↳ Butha Banner	transferred	
1979-05-30	↳ Arun Banner	↳ Arun Banner	transferred	
1979-05-30	↳ Xuguit Banner	↳ Xuguit Banner	transferred	
1979-05-30	↳ Jalaid Banner	↳ Jalaid Banner	transferred	
1979-05-30	↳ Ergun Right Banner	↳ Ergun Right Banner	transferred	
1979-05-30	↳ Ergun Left Banner	↳ Ergun Left Banner	transferred	
1979-05-30	↳ Old Barag Banner	↳ Old Barag Banner	transferred	
1979-05-30	↳ New Barag Left Banner	↳ New Barag Left Banner	transferred	
1979-05-30	↳ New Barag Right Banner	↳ New Barag Right Banner	transferred	
1979-05-30	↳ Oroqen Banner (Aut.)	↳ Oroqen Banner (Aut.)	transferred	
1979-05-30	↳ Hailar (PC-City)	↳ Hailar (PC-City)	transferred	
1979-05-30	↳ Manzhouli (PC-City)	↳ Manzhouli (PC-City)	transferred	
1979-05-30	parts of Daxing'anling Prefecture	Hulunbuir League	transferred	
1979-05-30	↳ Evenk Banner (Aut.)	↳ Evenk Banner (Aut.)	transferred	
1979-05-30	↳ Morindawa Banner (Aut.)	↳ Morindawa Banner (Aut.)	transferred	
1979-05-30	parts of Jilin Province	Inner Mongolia A.R.	provincial transferred	
1979-05-30	parts of Baicheng Prefecture	Hulunbuir League	transferred	
1979-05-30	↳ Tuquan County	↳ Tuquan County	transferred	
1979-05-30	↳ Horqin Right Front Banner	↳ Horqin Right Front Banner	transferred	
1979-05-30	Jirem League	Jirem League	transferred	
1979-05-30	↳ Tongliao County	↳ Tongliao County	transferred	
1979-05-30	↳ Kailu County	↳ Kailu County	transferred	
1979-05-30	↳ Naiman Banner	↳ Naiman Banner	transferred	
1979-05-30	↳ Hure Banner	↳ Hure Banner	transferred	
1979-05-30	↳ Jarud Banner	↳ Jarud Banner	transferred	
1979-05-30	↳ Horqin Left Middle Banner	↳ Horqin Left Middle Banner	transferred	
1979-05-30	↳ Horqin Right Middle Banner	↳ Horqin Right Middle Banner	transferred	
1979-05-30	↳ Horqin Left Rear Banner	↳ Horqin Left Rear Banner	transferred	
1979-05-30	↳ Tongliao (PC-City)	↳ Tongliao (PC-City)	transferred	
1979-05-30	parts of Liaoning Province	Inner Mongolia A.R.	provincial transferred	
1979-05-30	Ju'ud League	Ju'ud League	transferred	
1979-05-30	↳ Chifeng County	↳ Chifeng County	transferred	
1979-05-30	↳ Ningcheng County	↳ Ningcheng County	transferred	
1979-05-30	↳ Linxi County	↳ Linxi County	transferred	
1979-05-30	↳ Aohan Banner	↳ Aohan Banner	transferred	
1979-05-30	↳ Ongniud Banner	↳ Ongniud Banner	transferred	
1979-05-30	↳ Harqin Banner	↳ Harqin Banner	transferred	
1979-05-30	↳ Bairin Right Banner	↳ Bairin Right Banner	transferred	
1979-05-30	↳ Bairin Left Banner	↳ Bairin Left Banner	transferred	
1979-05-30	↳ Hexigten Banner	↳ Hexigten Banner	transferred	
1979-05-30	↳ Arhorqin Banner	↳ Arhorqin Banner	transferred	
1979-05-30	↳ Chifeng (PC-City)	↳ Chifeng (PC-City)	transferred	
1979-05-30	parts of Ningxia Hui A.R.	Inner Mongolia A.R.	provincial transferred	
1979-05-30	provincial-controlled	Alxa League	transferred & established	
1979-05-30	↳ Alxa Left Banner	↳ Alxa Left Banner	transferred	
1979-05-30	parts of Gansu Province	Inner Mongolia A.R.	provincial transferred	
1979-05-30	parts of Wuwei Prefecture	Alxa League	transferred & established	
1979-05-30	↳ Alxa Right Banner	↳ Alxa Right Banner	transferred	
1979-05-30	parts of Jiuquan Prefecture	Alxa League	transferred & established	
1979-05-30	↳ Ejin Banner	↳ Ejin Banner	transferred	
1980-05-13	Xiangyang District	Yuquan District	renamed	
1980-05-08	parts of Ulanqab League	Xilingol League	transferred	
1980-05-08	↳ Erenhot (PC-City)	↳ Erenhot (PC-City)	transferred	
1980-05-08	↳ Sonid Right Banner	↳ Sonid Right Banner	transferred	
1980-07-26	parts of Horqin Right Front Banner	Ulanhot (PC-City)	established	
1980-07-26	parts of Hulunbuir League	Hinggan League	established	
1980-07-26	↳ Horqin Right Front Banner	↳ Horqin Right Front Banner	transferred	
1980-07-26	↳ Jalaid Banner	↳ Jalaid Banner	transferred	
1980-07-26	↳ Tuquan County	↳ Tuquan County	transferred	
1980-07-26	parts of Jirem League	Hinggan League	established	
1980-07-26	↳ Horqin Right Middle Banner	↳ Horqin Right Middle Banner	transferred	
1980-07-26	↳ Ulanhot (PC-City)	↳ Ulanhot (PC-City)	transferred	
1980-08-12	parts of Otog Banner	Otog Front Banner	established	
1980-11-01	Jianhua Kuang District	Qingshan District	merged into	
1981-08-21	Urat Middle Rear United Banner	Urat Middle Banner	renamed	
1981-08-21	Chaoge Banner	Urat Rear Banner	renamed	
1983-01-18	all Province-controlled city (P-City) → Prefecture-level city (PL-City)			Civil Affairs Announcement
1983-01-18	all Prefecture-controlled city (PC-City) → County-level city (CL-City)			Civil Affairs Announcement
1983-10-10	Ju'ud League	Chifeng (PL-City)	reorganized	
1983-10-10	Chifeng (CL-City)	Hongshan District	disestablished & established	
1983-10-10	Chifeng (CL-City)	Yuanbaoshan District	disestablished & established	
1983-10-10	Chifeng County	Jiao District, Chifeng	reorganized	
1983-10-10	Abganar Banner	Xilinhot (CL-City)	reorganized	
1983-10-10	Xuguit Banner	Yakeshi (CL-City)	reorganized	
1983-10-10	Butha Banner	Zhalantun (CL-City)	reorganized	
1983-10-10	Dongsheng County	Dongsheng (CL-City)	reorganized	
1984-12-11	Linhe County	Linhe (CL-City)	reorganized	
1985-11-09	parts of Jarud Banner	Holingol (CL-City)	established	
1986-07-21	Tongliao County	Tongliao (CL-City)	merged into	
1990-11-15	Fengzhen County	Fengzhen (CL-City)	reorganized	
1993-05-03	Jiao District, Chifeng	Songshan District	renamed	Civil Affairs [1993]89
1994-04-28	Ergun Left Banner	Genhe (CL-City)	reorganized	Civil Affairs [1994]65
1994-07-13	Ergun Right Banner	Ergun (CL-City)	reorganized	Civil Affairs [1994]111
1995-11-21	parts of Ulanqab League	Hohhot (PL-City)	transferred	
1995-11-21	↳ Horinger County	↳ Horinger County	transferred	
1995-11-21	↳ Qingshuihe County	↳ Qingshuihe County	transferred	
1995-11-21	parts of Ulanqab League	Hohhot (PL-City)	transferred	State Council [1996]36
1995-11-21	↳ Wuchuan County	↳ Wuchuan County	transferred	State Council [1996]36
1996-06-10	parts of Horqin Right Front Banner	Arxan (CL-City)	established	Civil Affairs [1996]41
1999-01-30	Jirem League	Tongliao (PL-City)	reorganized	State Council [1999]5
1999-01-30	Tongliao (CL-City)	Horqin District	reorganized	State Council [1999]5
1999-08-10	Jiao District, Baotou	Jiuyuan District	renamed	Civil Affairs [1999]22
1999-08-10	Shiguai Mining District	Shiguai District	renamed	Civil Affairs [1999]22
2000-05-15	Jiao District, Hohhot	Saihan District	renamed	State Council [2000]42
2000-05-15	Jiao District, Hohhot	Xincheng District	merged into	State Council [2000]42
2000-05-15	Jiao District, Hohhot	Huimin District	merged into	State Council [2000]42
2000-05-15	Jiao District, Hohhot	Yuquan District	merged into	State Council [2000]42
2001-02-26	Ih'ju League	Ordos (PL-City)	reorganized	State Council [2001]17
2001-02-26	Dongsheng (CL-City)	Dongsheng District	reorganized	State Council [2001]17
2001-10-10	Hulunbuir League	Hulunbuir (PL-City)	reorganized	State Council [2001]130
2001-10-10	Hailar (CL-City)	Hailar District	reorganized	State Council [2001]130
2003-12-01	Bayannur League	Bayannur (PL-City)	reorganized	State Council [2003]121
2003-12-01	Linhe (CL-City)	Linhe District	reorganized	State Council [2003]121
2003-12-01	Ulanqab League	Ulanqab (PL-City)	reorganized	State Council [2003]122
2003-12-01	Jining (CL-City)	Jining District	reorganized	State Council [2003]122
2013-03-06	parts of Manzhouli (CL-City)	Jalainur District	established	Civil Affairs [2013]68
2016-06-08	parts of Dongsheng District	Kangbashi District	established	State Council [2016]102
2016-06-08	parts of Ejin'horo Banner	Kangbashi District	established	State Council [2016]102

== Population composition and area ==
=== Prefectures ===
Prefecture	2020	2010	2000	Area
Alxa	262,361	231,334	199,351	267,574 km^{2}
Bayannur	1,538,715	1,669,915	1,713,800	65,788 km^{2}
Wuhai	556,621	532,902	434,925	1,754 km^{2}
Ordos	2,153,638	1,940,653	1,395,441	86,752 km^{2}
Baotou	2,709,378	2,650,364	2,297,404	27,768 km^{2}
Hohhot	3,446,100	2,866,615	2,437,898	17,186.1 km^{2}
Ulanqab	1,706,328	2,143,590	1,894,196	54,491 km^{2}
Xilingol	1,107,075	1,028,022	993,400	211,866 km^{2}
Chifeng	4,035,967	4,341,245	4,518,046	90,275 km^{2}
Tongliao	2,873,168	3,139,153	3,083,461	59,535 km^{2}
Hinggan	1,416,929	1,613,250	1,618,882	59,806 km^{2}
Hulunbuir	2,242,875	2,549,278	2,736,543	263,953 km^{2}

=== Counties ===
Name	Prefecture	2010
Xincheng	Hohhot	567,255
Huimin	Hohhot	394,555
Yuquan	Hohhot	383,365
Saihan	Hohhot	635,599
Tumed Left	Hohhot	312,532
Togtoh	Hohhot	200,840
Horinger	Hohhot	169,856
Qingshuihe	Hohhot	93,887
Wuchuan	Hohhot	108,726
Donghe	Baotou	512,045
Hondlon	Baotou	726,838
Qingshan	Baotou	481,216
Shiguai	Baotou	35,805
Bayan Obo	Baotou	26,050
Jiuyuan	Baotou	195,831
Binhe	Baotou	119,066
Tumed Right	Baotou	276,453
Darhan Muminggan United	Baotou	101,486
Guyang	Baotou	175,574
Haibowan	Wuhai	296,177
Hainan	Wuhai	103,355
Wuda	Wuhai	133,370
Hongshan	Chifeng	434,785
Yuanbaoshan	Chifeng	325,170
Songshan	Chifeng	573,571
Ar Horqin	Chifeng	272,205
Bairin Left	Chifeng	327,765
Bairin Right	Chifeng	175,543
Hexigten	Chifeng	211,155
Ongniud	Chifeng	433,298
Harqin	Chifeng	293,246
Aohan	Chifeng	547,043
Linxi	Chifeng	200,619
Ningcheng	Chifeng	546,845
Horqin	Tongliao	898,895
Horqin Left Middle	Tongliao	514,741
Horqin Left Rear	Tongliao	379,237
Hure	Tongliao	167,020
Naiman	Tongliao	401,509
Jarud	Tongliao	279,371
Kailu	Tongliao	396,166
Holingol	Tongliao	102,214
Dongsheng	Ordos	582,544
Kangbashi District	Ordos	not established
Dalad	Ordos	322,101
Jungar	Ordos	356,501
Otog Front	Ordos	68,282
Otog	Ordos	148,844
Hanggin	Ordos	111,102
Uxin	Ordos	124,527
Ejin Horo	Ordos	226,752
Hailar	Hulunbuir	344,947
Jalainur	Hulunbuir	not established
Arun	Hulunbuir	278,744
Old Barag	Hulunbuir	58,244
New Barag Left	Hulunbuir	40,258
New Barag Right	Hulunbuir	36,356
Morin Dawa	Hulunbuir	276,912
Oroqen	Hulunbuir	223,752
Evenk	Hulunbuir	134,981
Manzhouli	Hulunbuir	249,473
Yakeshi	Hulunbuir	352,177
Zhalantun	Hulunbuir	366,326
Ergun	Hulunbuir	76,667
Genhe	Hulunbuir	110,441
Linhe	Bayannur	541,721
Urad Front	Bayannur	293,269
Urad Middle	Bayannur	134,204
Urad Rear	Bayannur	65,207
Hanggin Rear	Bayannur	257,943
Wuyuan	Bayannur	260,480
Dengkou	Bayannur	117,091
Jining	Ulanqab	298,887
Chahar Right Front	Ulanqab	247,285
Chahar Right Middle	Ulanqab	219,038
Chahar Right Rear	Ulanqab	217,877
Siziwang	Ulanqab	210,646
Zhuozi	Ulanqab	226,144
Huade	Ulanqab	175,621
Shangdu	Ulanqab	346,985
Xinghe	Ulanqab	317,286
Liangcheng	Ulanqab	246,038
Fengzhen	Ulanqab	336,749
Ulanhot	Hinggan	327,081
Arxan	Hinggan	68,311
Horqin Right Front	Hinggan	299,834
Horqin Right Middle	Hinggan	251,465
Jalaid	Hinggan	392,346
Tuquan	Hinggan	274,213
Erenhot	Xilingol	74,197
Xilinhot	Xilingol	245,886
Abag	Xilingol	43,574
Sonid Left	Xilingol	33,652
Sonid Right	Xilingol	71,063
East Ujimqin	Xilingol	93,962
West Ujimqin	Xilingol	87,614
Taibus	Xilingol	112,339
Xianghuang	Xilingol	28,450
Zhengxiangbai	Xilingol	54,443
Zhenglan	Xilingol	81,967
Duolun	Xilingol	100,893
Alxa Left	Alxa	173,494
Alxa Right	Alxa	25,430
Ejin	Alxa	32,410
