= List of township-level divisions of Inner Mongolia =

Location of Inner Mongolia in China

This is a list of township-level divisions of the Inner Mongolia Autonomous Region, People's Republic of China (PRC). After province, prefecture, and county-level divisions, township-level divisions constitute the formal fourth-level administrative divisions of the PRC. This list is divided first into the prefecture-level then the county-level divisions.

See also: Sums of Inner Mongolia (苏木)

== Hohhot ==
=== Huimin District (回民区) ===
Subdistricts 街道

- Xinhua West Road Subdistrict, Huimin (新华西路街道), Central Mountain West Road Subdistrict (中山西路街道), Guanming Road Subdistrict (光明路街道), Haizheer West Road Subdistrict (海拉尔西路街道), Huan River Subdistrict (环河街街道), Tongdao Autonomous Area (通道街街道), Gangtie Road Subdistrict (钢铁路街道)

Townships板镇

- Youban Township, Huimin (攸攸板镇)

=== Saihan District (赛罕区) ===
- Subdistricts

Renminlu Subdistrict (人民路街道), Daxuexilu Subdistrict (大学西路街道), Ulaanchab East Road Subdistrict (乌兰察布东路街道), Daxue East Road Subdistrict (大学东路街道), Zhongzhuan Road Subdistrict (中专路街道), Zhaowudao Road Subdistrict, (昭乌达路街道), Bayan Subdistrict (巴彦街道), Chile Subdistrict (敕勒川街道)

=== Xincheng District (新城区, ᠰᠢᠨ᠎ᠡ ᠬᠣᠲᠠ ᠲᠣᠭᠣᠷᠢᠭ) ===
- Subdistricts

Hailerai East Road Subdistrict (海拉尔东路街道), Xilinbei North Road Subdistrict (锡林北路街道), Central Mountain East Road Subdistrict (中山东路街道), Dongjie Subdistrict (东街街道), Xijie Subdistrict (西街街道), Dongxi road Subdistrict (东风路街道), Huanxi Road Subdistrict (迎新路街道), Genghis Khan Street Subdistrict (成吉思汗大街街道), 保合少镇和新城区鸿盛高科技园区。

=== Yuquan District (玉泉区) ===
- subdistricts

小召前街街道、兴隆巷街道、长和廊街道、石东路街道、大南街街道、鄂尔多斯路街道、西菜园街道、昭君路街道、小黑河镇和裕隆工业园区。

=== Qingshuihe County (清水河县) ===
- 镇

Lamawen Township, Qingshuie (喇嘛湾镇), Chengguan, Qingshuihe, (城关镇), Honghe, Qingshuihe (宏河镇老), Niuwan, Qingshuihe (牛湾镇)

- 乡

Yaogou Township (窑沟乡), Beibao Township, (北堡乡), Jiucaizhuang, Qingshuihe (韭菜庄乡), Wuyingtai Town (五良太乡)

=== Togtoh County (托克托县), ( ᠲᠣᠭᠲᠠᠬᠤ ᠰᠢᠶᠠᠨ ) ===
Township (镇)

- Shuanghe Township, Hohhot, (双河镇), Xinyingxi, Hohhot, (新营子镇), Wushen Township, Hohhot (五申镇), Gucheng, Hohhot (古城镇), Wushenjia, Hohhot (伍什家镇)

=== Wuchuan County (武川县) ===
镇 Heheyiwe Town, Wuchuan (可可以力更镇), Hele Town, Wuchuan (哈乐镇), Xiwulanbuer, Wuchuan (西乌兰不浪镇) 乡

- Daqingshan Township, Wuchuan (大青山乡), Deshenggou Township, Wuchuan(德胜沟乡), Shangtuhai Township, Wuchuan (上秃亥乡), Halaheshao Township, Wuchuan (哈拉合少乡), Erfengzi Township, Wuchuan(二份子乡), Haolaishan Township, Wuchuan (耗赖山乡)

=== Tumed Left Banner (土默特左旗) ===
镇

- Chasuqi Town, Tumed (察素齐镇), Bikeqi Town, Tumed (毕克齐镇), Shanhua Town, Tumed (善岱镇), Baijiuzi Town, Tumed (白庙子镇), Baimiaozi Town, Tumed (台阁牧镇), Sha'erxing Town, Tumed (沙尔沁镇), Chileichuan Town, Tumed (敕勒川镇)

乡

- Beishenzhou Township, Tumed (北什轴乡), Tabusha Township, Tumed (塔布赛乡)

== Alxa League (阿拉善盟) ==
=== Alxa Left Banner (阿拉善左旗) ===
Towns

- Bayan Haote, Alxa (巴彦浩特镇), Jiaergalesaihan Town, Alxa(嘉尔嘎勒赛汉镇), Wenduerletu Town, Alxa (温都尔勒图镇), Jilantai, Alxa (吉兰泰镇), Wusitai, Alxa (乌斯太镇), Barunbie, Alxa (巴润别立镇), Zongbieli, Alxa (宗别立镇), Aolunbulage, Alxa (敖伦布拉格镇), Tenggelielli, Alxa (腾格里额里斯镇)

Banner (苏木)

- Bayan Muren County, Alxa (巴彦木仁苏木), Wuliji County, Alxa (乌力吉苏木), Bayan nuorigong County, Alxa (巴彦诺日公苏木), Eerkehashenha County, Alxa (额尔克哈什哈苏木), Yingen County, Alxa (银根苏木), Chaogetuhu County, Alxa (超格图呼热苏木)

=== Alxa Right Banner (阿拉善右旗) ===
Town 镇

- Badan Jilin Town, Alxa Right Banner (巴丹吉林镇), Yabulai, Alxa Right Banner(雅布赖镇), Alatengaobao Town, Alxa Right Banner (阿拉腾敖包镇)

County 苏木

- Alatengchaogesu County, Alxa Right Banner (阿拉腾朝格苏木), Mandela County, Alxa Right Banner (曼德拉苏木), Talmusubulage County, Alxa Right Banner (塔木素布拉格苏木), Bayangaole County, Alxa Right Banner (巴彦高勒苏木)

=== Ejin Banner (额济纳) ===
Town

- Dongfeng Town, Ejin (东风镇), Dalaihubu Town, Ejin (达来呼布镇), Hariburigedeyinwula Town, Ejin (哈日布日格德音乌拉镇)

County 苏木

- SaihanTaolai County, Ejin (赛汉陶来苏木), Mazongshan County, Ejin (马鬃山苏木), Subaoerner County, Ejin (苏泊淖尔苏木), Bayanlai County, Ejin (巴彦陶来苏), Muwentugaole County, Ejin (木温图高勒苏木)

== Baotou (包头市; ) ==
=== Bayan Obo Mining District (云鄂博矿区; ᠪᠠᠶᠠᠨ ᠣᠪᠣᠭ᠋᠎ᠠ ᠠᠭᠤᠷᠬᠠᠢ ᠶᠢᠨ ᠲᠣᠭᠣᠷᠢᠭ ) ===
It has two subdistricts

=== Donghe District ( 东河区, ᠳᠦᠩᠾᠧ ᠲᠣᠭᠣᠷᠢᠭ ) ===
- Subdistrict 街道

Heping Subdistrict, Baotou (和平街道), Caishenye Subdistrict, Baotou (财神庙街道), (西脑包街道), (南门外街道), (南圪洞街道), Donggu Subdistrict, Baotou, Dongzhan Subdistrict, Baotou (东站街道), Renmin Subdistrict, Baotou (回民街道), Tianjiao Subdistrict, Baotou (天骄街道), Hedong Subdistrict, Baotou (河东街道), Tiexi Subdistrict, Baotou (铁西街道), Dongxing Subdistrict, Baotou (东兴街道), Yanggeleng, Baotou(杨圪楞街道)

- Towns 镇

Hedong Town, Donghe (河东镇), Sha'erxing Town, Baotou (沙尔沁镇)

=== Jiuyuan District (九原区; ᠵᠢᠦᠶᠤᠸᠠᠨ ᠲᠣᠭᠣᠷᠢᠭ ===
- Subdistrict街道

Shahe Subdistrict, Jiuyuan (沙河街道), Saihan Subdistrict (赛汗街道), Sarula Subdistrict, Jiuyuan (萨如拉街道), Baiyinxile Subdistrict (白音席勒街道)

- Town 镇

Machi Town, Jiuyuan (麻池镇), Hayehutong Subdistrict, Jiuyuan (哈业胡同镇), Halinge'er Town, Jiuyuan (哈林格尔镇)

=== Kundulun District ( ᠬᠥᠨᠳᠡᠯᠡᠨ ᠲᠣᠭᠣᠷᠢᠭ, 昆都仑区) ===
There are 15 subdivisions. Shaoxian Road Subdistrict, Shiguai (少先路街道), Kunbei Subdistrict, Shiguai (昆北街道), Zhaotan Subdistrict, Shiguai (沼潭街道) Linyin road Subdistrict, Shiguai (林荫路街道), Youyi dajie Subdistrict, Shiguai (友谊大街街道), Aerdingdajie subdistrict, shiguai (阿尔丁大街街道), Tuanjie Main street Subdistrict, Shiguai (团结大街街道), Anshandao Subdistrict, Shiguai (鞍山道街道), (前进道街道), Qianjindao Subdistrict, Shiguai (市府东路街道), Baiyun road subdistrict, Shiguai (白云路街道), Huanghe West Road Subdistrict (黄河西路街道), Kungong Subdistrict, Shiguai (昆工路街道), Kunhe Township, Shiguai(昆河镇)

=== Qingshan District 青山区 ===
Xianfengdao Subdistrict, Qingshan (先锋道街道), Xingfulu Subdistrict, Qingshan (幸福路街道), Mowanqing road Subdistrict, Qingshan (万青路街道), Fuqianglu Subdistrict, Qingshan (富强路街道), Kexue road Subdistrict, Qingshan (科学路街道), Qingshan road subdistrict, Subdistrict (青山路街道), Ziyou road Subdistrict, Qingshan (自由路街道), Wusutu Subdistrict, Qingshan (乌素图街道), Xitulu Subdistrict, Qingshan (稀土路街道), Qingfu Town, Qingshan (青福镇), Xingsheng Town, Qingshan (兴胜镇)

=== Shiguai District (石拐區) ===
街道

- Shiguai Subdistrict, Shiguai (石拐街道), Dafa Subdistrict, Shiguai (大发街道), Daci Subdistrict, Shiguai (大磁街道), Wudanggou Subdistrict, Shiguai (五当沟街道), Baihugou Subdistrict, Shiguai (白狐沟街道), Dadeheng Subdistrict, Shuguai (大德恒街道)

=== Guyang County ===
Jinshan Town, Guyang, (金山镇), Xidou Township, Guyang, (西斗铺镇), Xiashihao Town, Guyang (下湿壕镇), Yinhao Town, Guyang (银号镇), Huaishou Town, Guyang (怀朔镇), Xingshunxi Town, Guyang (兴顺西镇)

=== Darhan Muminggan United Banner ===
- Bailingmiao Town, Darhan (百灵庙镇), Mandula, Darhan (满都拉镇), xilamuren, Darhan (希拉穆仁镇), Mingan, Darhan (明安镇), Bayinhua, Darhan (巴音花镇), Shibao Town, Darhan (石宝镇), Wukehdong Town, Darhana (乌克忽洞镇)

=== Tumed Right Banner ===
百灵庙镇满都拉镇希拉穆仁镇明安镇巴音花镇石宝镇乌克忽洞镇

== Bayannur ==
=== Linhe District ===
Subdistricts 街道

- Tuanjie Subdistrict, Linhe (团结街道), Chezhan Subdistrict, Linhe (车站街道), Xianfeng Subdistrict, Linhe (先锋街道), Jiefang Subdistrict, Linhe (解放街道), Xinhua Subdistrict, Linhe (新华街道), Dongjie Road Subdistrict, Linhe (东环路街), Daotie Subdistrict, Linhe (道铁南街道), Liuhuanlu Subdistrict, Linhe (西环路街道), Beihuairoad Subdistrict, Linhe (北环路街道), Jinchuan Subdistrict, Linhe (金川街道), Huifeng Subdistrict, Linhe (汇丰街道)

Town 镇

- Langshan Town, Linhe (狼山镇), Xinhua Subdistrict, Linhe (新华镇), Ganshaomiao Town, Linhe(干召庙镇), Wulantuke, Linhe (乌兰图克镇), Shuanghe Town, Linhe (双河镇), Chengguan, Linhe(城关镇), Bainaobao, Linhe (白脑包镇)
