= Qingshan Qu =

Qingshan Qu may refer to:

- Qingshan District, Wuhan (青山区; Qīngshān Qū), Hubei, China
- Qingshan District, Baotou (青山区; Qīngshān Qū), Inner Mongolia, China
- Qu Qingshan (born 1957), Chinese politician
