= Huade County =

Huade County 化德县 • ᠬᠤᠸᠠᠳᠧ ᠰᠢᠶᠠᠨ
- County
- Location in Inner Mongolia Huade (China)
- Coordinates: 41°54′N 114°01′E
- Country: China
- Autonomous region: Inner Mongolia
- Prefecture-level city: Ulaan Chab
- County seat: Changshun

Area
  - Total: 2,520 km^{2} (970 sq mi)
- Elevation: 1,464 m (4,803 ft)

Population (2020)
  - Total: 95,273
  - Density: 37.8/km^{2} (97.9/sq mi)
- Time zone: UTC+8 (China Standard)
- Website: www.huade.gov.cn

Huade County

Chinese name
- Simplified Chinese: 化德县
- Traditional Chinese: 化德縣
Transcriptions
Standard Mandarin
- Hanyu Pinyin: Huàdé Xiàn

Mongolian name
- Mongolian Cyrillic: Хуате шиан
- Mongolian script: ᠬᠤᠸᠠᠳᠧ ᠰᠢᠶᠠᠨ
Transcriptions
- SASM/GNC: Quvadė siyan

Huade (Mongolian: ᠬᠤᠸᠠᠳᠧ ᠰᠢᠶᠠᠨ; Chinese: 化德县) is a county of central Inner Mongolia, China, bordering Hebei province to the southeast, Xilin Gol League to the northeast, and Shangdu County to the west. It is under the administration of Ulaan Chab city.

== Administrative divisions ==
Huade County is made up of 3 towns and 3 townships.

Name	Simplified Chinese	Hanyu Pinyin	Mongolian (Hudum Script)	Mongolian (Cyrillic)	Administrative division code
Towns
Changshun Town	长顺镇	Chángshùn Zhèn	ᠴᠠᠩ ᠱᠦᠨ ᠪᠠᠯᠭᠠᠰᠤ	Цан шөн балгас	150922103
Chaoyang Town	朝阳镇	Cháoyáng Zhèn	ᠴᠣᠤ ᠶᠠᠩ ᠪᠠᠯᠭᠠᠰᠤ	Цуу ян балгас	150922104
Qihao Town	七号镇	Qīhào Zhèn	ᠴᠢ ᠬᠣᠤ ᠪᠠᠯᠭᠠᠰᠤ	Чи хоо балгас	150922105
Townships
Dabat Township	德包图乡	Débāotú Xiāng	ᠳᠠᠪᠠᠭᠠᠲᠤ ᠰᠢᠶᠠᠩ	Даваат шиян	150922200
Gun Hudag Township	公腊胡洞乡	Gōnglàhúdòng Xiāng	ᠭᠦᠨᠬᠤᠳᠳᠤᠭ ᠰᠢᠶᠠᠩ	Хнхудаг шиян	150922201
Bayan Tal Township	白音特拉乡	Báiyīntèlā Xiāng	ᠪᠠᠶᠠᠨᠲᠠᠯ᠎ᠠ ᠰᠢᠶᠠᠩ	Баянтөл шиян	150922202

Other: Changshun Industrial Park, Huade County (化德县长顺工业园区)

== Climate ==
Huade has a monsoon-influenced, continental semi-arid climate (Köppen BSk), with very cold and dry winters, hot, somewhat humid summers, and strong winds, especially in spring. The monthly 24-hour average temperature ranges from −15.1 °C (4.8 °F) in January to 19.5 °C (67.1 °F) in July, with the annual mean at 3.23 °C (37.8 °F). The annual precipitation is 313 millimetres (12.3 in), with more than half of it falling in July and August alone. With monthly percent possible sunshine ranging from 60% in July to 75% in January and October, sunshine is abundant year-round, and there are 3,077 hours of bright sunshine annually.

Climate data for Huade County, elevation 1,483 m (4,865 ft), (1991–2020 normals, extremes 1951–2010)
Month	Jan	Feb	Mar	Apr	May	Jun	Jul	Aug	Sep	Oct	Nov	Dec	Year
Record high °C (°F)	6.9 (44.4)	13.4 (56.1)	20.1 (68.2)	29.4 (84.9)	31.9 (89.4)	36.4 (97.5)	36.5 (97.7)	32.9 (91.2)	31.9 (89.4)	23.7 (74.7)	16.8 (62.2)	10.8 (51.4)	36.5 (97.7)
Mean daily maximum °C (°F)	−8.7 (16.3)	−4.0 (24.8)	3.5 (38.3)	12.1 (53.8)	19.0 (66.2)	23.7 (74.7)	25.8 (78.4)	24.3 (75.7)	19.0 (66.2)	10.7 (51.3)	0.8 (33.4)	−7.0 (19.4)	9.9 (49.9)
Daily mean °C (°F)	−14.7 (5.5)	−10.6 (12.9)	−3.2 (26.2)	5.3 (41.5)	12.5 (54.5)	17.4 (63.3)	19.8 (67.6)	18.2 (64.8)	12.5 (54.5)	4.2 (39.6)	−5.3 (22.5)	−12.7 (9.1)	3.6 (38.5)
Mean daily minimum °C (°F)	−19.1 (−2.4)	−15.6 (3.9)	−8.7 (16.3)	−0.7 (30.7)	6.1 (43.0)	11.5 (52.7)	14.5 (58.1)	12.8 (55.0)	6.9 (44.4)	−0.9 (30.4)	−9.9 (14.2)	−17.0 (1.4)	−1.7 (29.0)
Record low °C (°F)	−31.5 (−24.7)	−30.9 (−23.6)	−25.8 (−14.4)	−14.4 (6.1)	−9.7 (14.5)	−1.5 (29.3)	5.6 (42.1)	4.2 (39.6)	−6.8 (19.8)	−15.7 (3.7)	−27.3 (−17.1)	−30.9 (−23.6)	−31.5 (−24.7)
Average precipitation mm (inches)	1.4 (0.06)	2.5 (0.10)	4.8 (0.19)	13.5 (0.53)	32.0 (1.26)	54.4 (2.14)	93.3 (3.67)	59.1 (2.33)	37.3 (1.47)	18.0 (0.71)	6.2 (0.24)	1.8 (0.07)	324.3 (12.77)
Average precipitation days (≥ 0.1 mm)	2.7	3.2	4.3	5.2	7.9	11.9	13.4	10.9	9.3	5.8	4.3	3.1	82
Average snowy days	5.9	6.7	6.6	4.5	0.9	0	0	0	0.5	3.5	7.2	7.9	43.7
Average relative humidity (%)	66	58	47	40	41	52	63	62	56	54	60	65	55
Mean monthly sunshine hours	213.0	214.3	256.2	260.3	284.9	266.3	270.7	267.4	240.1	241.5	205.0	196.7	2,916.4
Percentage possible sunshine	72	71	69	65	63	59	59	63	65	71	71	70	67
Source: China Meteorological Administration
