= Horqin Right Front Banner =

Horqin Right Front Banner 科尔沁右翼前旗 • ᠬᠣᠷᠴᠢᠨ ᠪᠠᠷᠠᠭᠤᠨ ᠭᠠᠷᠤᠨ ᠡᠮᠦᠨᠡᠳᠦ ᠬᠣᠰᠢᠭᠤ
- Banner
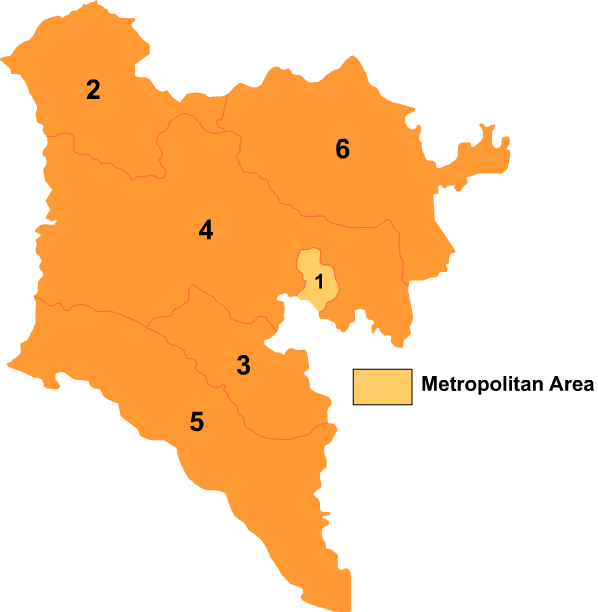
- Hinggan divisions: Horqin Right Front Banner is 4 on this map

- Location of the seat in Inner Mongolia Horqin RFB (China)
- Coordinates: 46°04′55″N 121°57′18″E
- Country: China
- Autonomous region: Inner Mongolia
- League: Hinggan
- Banner seat: Horqin Town

Area
  - Total: 19,375 km^{2} (7,481 sq mi)

Population (2020)
  - Total: 285,392
  - Density: 14.730/km^{2} (38.150/sq mi)
- Time zone: UTC+8 (China Standard)
- Division code: HYQ
- Website: www.kyqq.gov.cn

Horqin Right Front Banner

Chinese name
- Simplified Chinese: 科尔沁右翼前旗
- Traditional Chinese: 科爾沁右翼前旗
Transcriptions
Standard Mandarin
- Hanyu Pinyin: Kē'ěrqìn Yòuyì Qián Qi

Mongolian name
- Mongolian Cyrillic: Хорчин баруун гарын өмнөд хошуу
- Mongolian script: ᠬᠣᠷᠴᠢᠨ ᠪᠠᠷᠠᠭᠤᠨ ᠭᠠᠷᠤᠨ ᠡᠮᠦᠨᠡᠳᠦ ᠬᠣᠰᠢᠭᠤ
Transcriptions
- SASM/GNC: Qorčin Baraɣun Ɣarun Emünedü qosiɣu

Horqin Right Front Banner (Mongolian: ᠬᠣᠷᠴᠢᠨ ᠪᠠᠷᠠᠭᠤᠨ ᠭᠠᠷᠤᠨ ᠡᠮᠦᠨᠡᠳᠦ ᠬᠣᠰᠢᠭᠤ; Chinese: 科尔沁右翼前旗) is a banner in the east of Inner Mongolia, China, bordering Jilin province to the southeast. It is under the administration of Hinggan League. The local Mongolian dialect is Khorchin Mongolian.

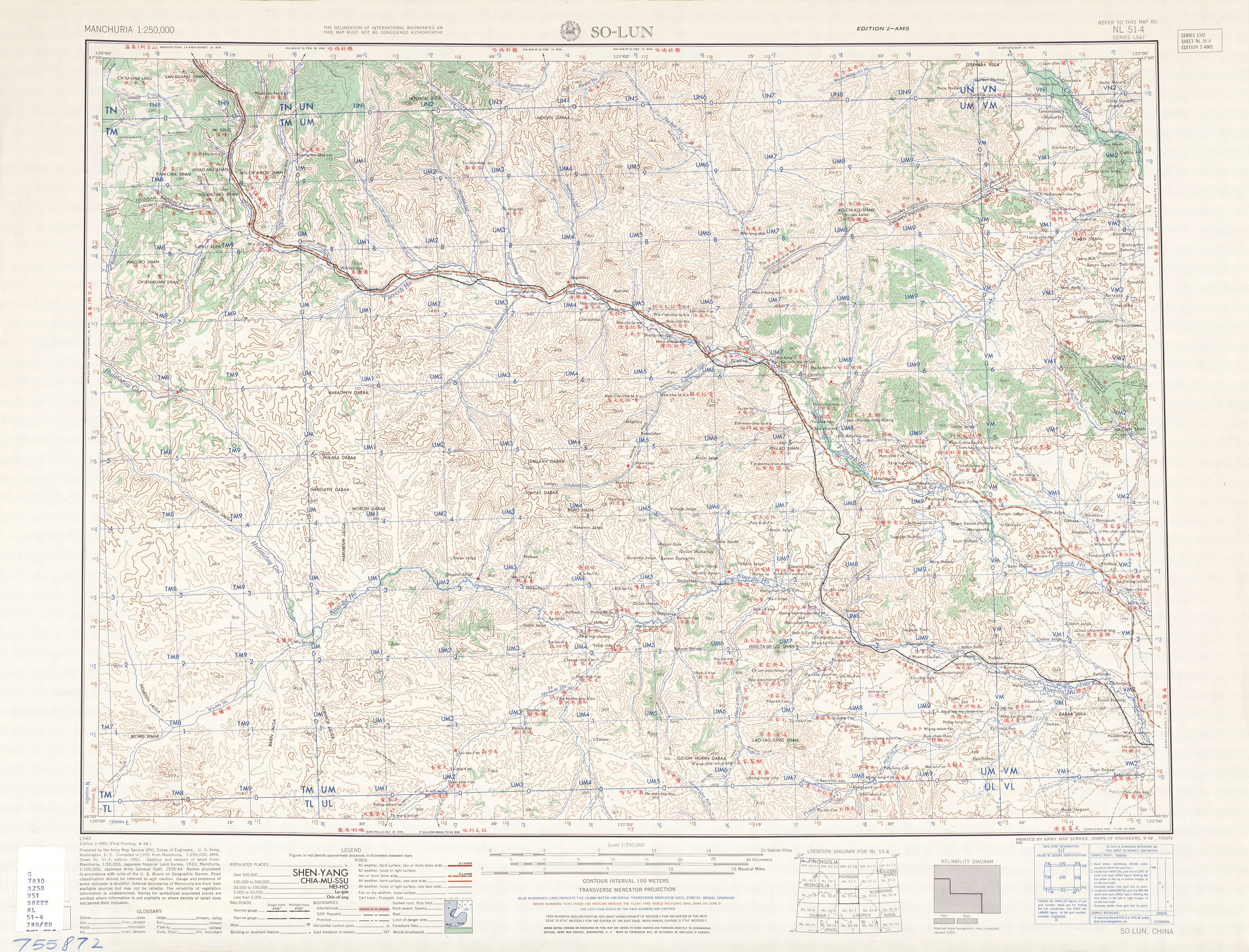
Map including part of modern-day Horqin Right Front Banner (AMS, 1955)

== Administrative divisions ==
Horqin Right Front Banner is divided into 9 towns, 1 township, 1 ethnic township, and 3 sums.

Name	Simplified Chinese	Hanyu Pinyin	Mongolian (Hudum Script)	Mongolian (Cyrillic)	Administrative division code
Towns
Horqin Town	科尔沁镇	Kē'ěrqìn Zhèn	ᠬᠣᠷᠴᠢᠨ ᠪᠠᠯᠭᠠᠰᠤ	Хорчин балгас	152221100
Solon Town	索伦镇	Suǒlún Zhèn	ᠰᠣᠯᠣᠨ ᠪᠠᠯᠭᠠᠰᠤ	Солон балгас	152221101
Debseg Town	德伯斯镇	Débósī Zhèn	ᠳᠡᠪᠰᠡᠭ ᠪᠠᠯᠭᠠᠰᠤ	Дэвсэг балгас	152221102
Dashizhai Town	大石寨镇	Dàshízhài Zhèn	ᠳ᠋ᠠᠱᠢᠵᠠᠢ ᠪᠠᠯᠭᠠᠰᠤ	Ташжээ балгас	152221103
Güiler Town	归流河镇	Guīliúhé Zhèn	ᠭᠦᠢᠯᠡᠷ ᠪᠠᠯᠭᠠᠰᠤ	Хийлөөр балгас	152221104
Jurhen Town	居力很镇	Jūlìhěn Zhèn	ᠵᠢᠷᠦᠬᠡᠨ ᠪᠠᠯᠭᠠᠰᠤ	Зүрхэн балгас	152221105
Qarsan Town	察尔森镇	Chá'ěrsēn Zhèn	ᠴᠠᠷᠠᠰᠤᠨ ᠪᠠᠯᠭᠠᠰᠤ	Царсан балгас	152221106
Eregt Town	额尔格图镇	É'ěrgétú Zhèn	ᠡᠷᠭᠢᠲᠦ ᠪᠠᠯᠭᠠᠰᠤ	Эрхт балгас	152221107
Netger Town	俄体镇	Étǐ Zhèn	ᠨᠡᠲᠦᠭᠡᠷ ᠪᠠᠯᠭᠠᠰᠤ	Нэтгэр балгас	152221108
Township
Burgastai Township	巴日嘎斯台乡	Bārìgāsītái Xiāng	ᠪᠤᠷᠭᠠᠰᠤᠲᠠᠢ ᠰᠢᠶᠠᠩ	Бургастай шиян	152221203
Ethnic township
Manjutun Manchu Ethnic Township	满族屯满族乡	Mǎnzútún Mǎnzú Xiāng	ᠮᠠᠨᠵᠤᠲ᠋ᠦ᠋ᠨ ᠦ ᠮᠠᠨᠵᠤ ᠦᠨᠳᠦᠰᠦᠲᠡᠨ ᠦ ᠰᠢᠶᠠᠩ	Манжтний манж үндэстэний шиян	152221200
Sums
Ulan Mod Sum	乌兰毛都苏木	Wūlánmáodū Sūmù	ᠤᠯᠠᠭᠠᠨᠮᠣᠳᠣ ᠰᠤᠮᠤ	Улаанумт сум	152221201
Aldar Sum	阿力得尔苏木	Ālìdé'ěr Sūmù	ᠠᠯᠳᠠᠷ ᠰᠤᠮᠤ	Алдар сум	152221202
Tohom Sum	桃合木苏木	Táohémù Sūmù	ᠲᠣᠬᠣᠮ ᠰᠤᠮᠤ	Тохом сум	152221204

Others:

- Yuejin Horse Herding Pasture (跃进马场)
- Solon Pasture (索伦牧场)
- Aldar Pasture (阿力得尔牧场)
- Gongzhuling Pasture (公主陵牧场)
- Lüshui Breeding Stock Center (绿水种畜繁育中心)
- Horqin Right Front Banner Industrial Park (科右前旗工业园区)
- Horqin Right Front Banner Modern Agriculture and Animal Husbandry Park (科右前旗现代农牧业园区)

== Climate ==
Climate data for Solun Town, Horqin Right Front Banner, elevation 500 m (1,600 ft), (1991–2020 normals)
Month	Jan	Feb	Mar	Apr	May	Jun	Jul	Aug	Sep	Oct	Nov	Dec	Year
Mean daily maximum °C (°F)	−9.5 (14.9)	−4.0 (24.8)	3.7 (38.7)	13.5 (56.3)	21.6 (70.9)	25.8 (78.4)	27.6 (81.7)	26.1 (79.0)	21.0 (69.8)	12.1 (53.8)	−0.3 (31.5)	−8.7 (16.3)	10.7 (51.3)
Daily mean °C (°F)	−16.7 (1.9)	−12.3 (9.9)	−4.4 (24.1)	5.7 (42.3)	13.8 (56.8)	18.6 (65.5)	21.2 (70.2)	19.0 (66.2)	12.5 (54.5)	4.0 (39.2)	−7.3 (18.9)	−15.2 (4.6)	3.2 (37.8)
Mean daily minimum °C (°F)	−22.3 (−8.1)	−19.0 (−2.2)	−11.5 (11.3)	−1.9 (28.6)	5.8 (42.4)	11.8 (53.2)	15.4 (59.7)	13.1 (55.6)	5.6 (42.1)	−2.6 (27.3)	−13.0 (8.6)	−20.6 (−5.1)	−3.3 (26.1)
Average precipitation mm (inches)	1.6 (0.06)	1.9 (0.07)	5.1 (0.20)	15.4 (0.61)	36.5 (1.44)	97.4 (3.83)	145.3 (5.72)	89.1 (3.51)	43.0 (1.69)	16.5 (0.65)	5.9 (0.23)	4.1 (0.16)	461.8 (18.17)
Average precipitation days (≥ 0.1 mm)	2.1	1.9	3.2	4.7	7.3	14.0	14.7	12.5	8.4	4.0	3.4	3.6	79.8
Average snowy days	3.5	2.6	5.0	3.4	0.6	0	0	0	0.2	2.0	4.2	5.1	26.6
Average relative humidity (%)	58	52	45	39	43	63	72	74	64	53	57	60	57
Mean monthly sunshine hours	201.9	217.7	266.9	260.2	272.1	249.9	251.2	261.0	249.8	234.4	189.4	176.8	2,831.3
Percentage possible sunshine	72	74	72	64	58	53	53	60	67	71	68	67	65
Source: China Meteorological Administration
