= Hondlon District =

Hondlon 昆都仑区 • ᠬᠥᠨᠳᠡᠯᠡᠨ ᠲᠣᠭᠣᠷᠢᠭ
- District
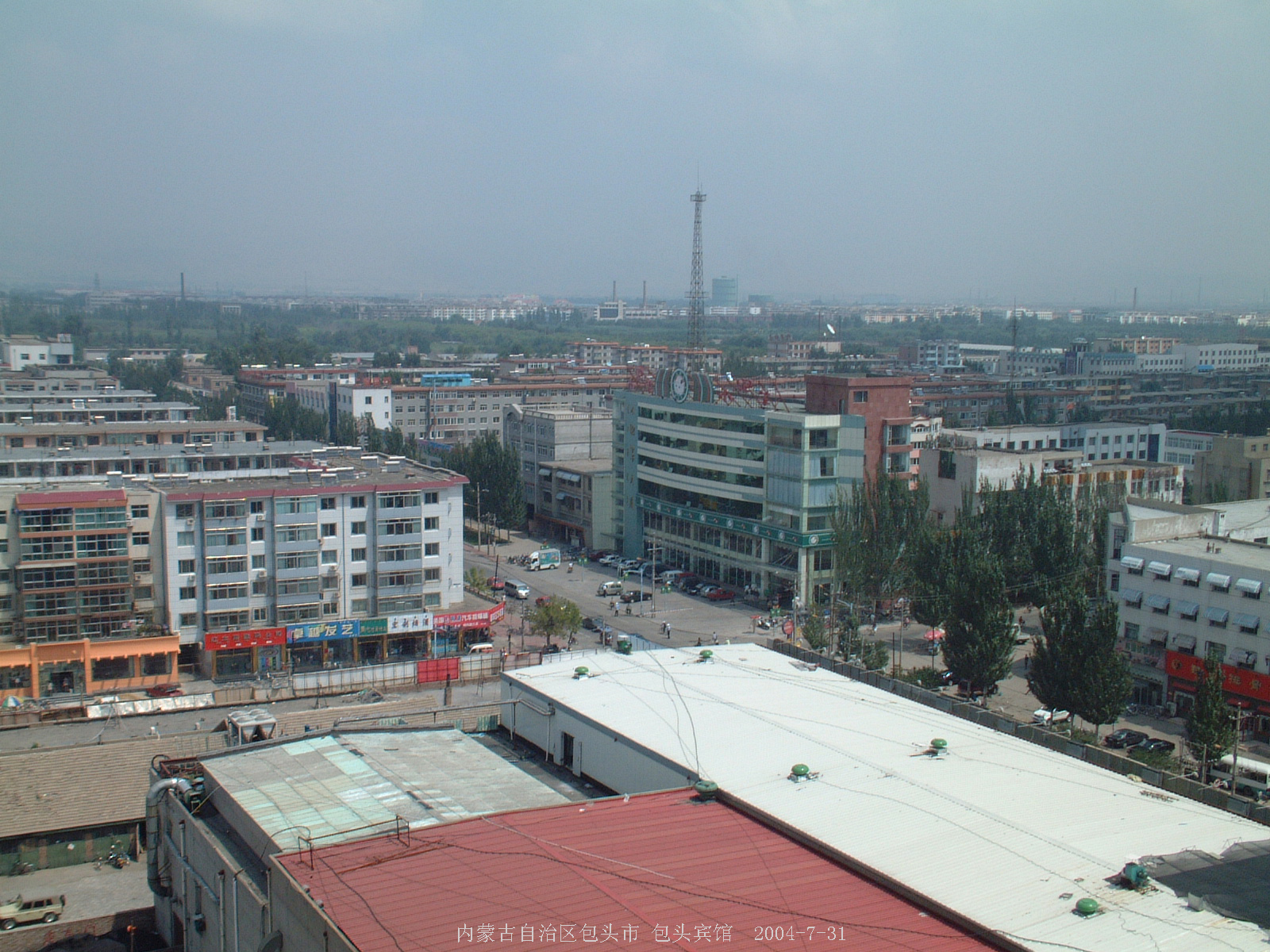

- Location within Inner Mongolia Location within China
- Coordinates: 40°38′32″N 109°50′17″E
- Country: China
- Autonomous region: Inner Mongolia
- Prefecture-level city: Baotou
- District seat: Arad Avenue Subdistrict

Area
  - Total: 320.6 km^{2} (123.8 sq mi)
- Elevation: 1,057 m (3,468 ft)

Population (2020)
  - Total: 787,681
  - Density: 2,457/km^{2} (6,363/sq mi)
- Time zone: UTC+8 (China Standard)
- Website: www.kdl.gov.cn

Hondlon District

Chinese name
- Simplified Chinese: 昆都仑区
- Traditional Chinese: 崑都崙區
Transcriptions
Standard Mandarin
- Hanyu Pinyin: Kūndūlún Qū

Mongolian name
- Mongolian Cyrillic: Хөндлөн дүүрэг
- Mongolian script: ᠬᠥᠨᠳᠡᠯᠡᠨ ᠲᠣᠭᠣᠷᠢᠭ
Transcriptions
- SASM/GNC: Köndelen toɣoriɣ

Hondlon District (Mongolian: ᠬᠥᠨᠳᠡᠯᠡᠨ ᠲᠣᠭᠣᠷᠢᠭ; Chinese: 昆都仑区) is a district of Baotou, the largest city of Inner Mongolia, China. It was a major destination of migration from Shaanxi, (Note: The movement is known in Chinese as 走西口.) as opposed to Donghe District which retains a mostly native population.

== Administrative divisions ==
Hondlon District is made up of 13 subdistricts and 2 towns.

Name	Simplified Chinese	Hanyu Pinyin	Mongolian (Hudum Script)	Mongolian (Cyrillic)	Administrative division code
Subdistricts
Shaoxian Road Subdistrict	少先路街道	Shàoxiānlù Jiēdào	ᠪᠠᠭᠠᠴᠤᠳ ᠵᠠᠮ ᠤᠨ ᠵᠡᠭᠡᠯᠢ ᠭᠤᠳᠤᠮᠵᠢ	Багачууд замын зээл гудамж	150203001
Zhaotan Subdistrict	沼潭街道	Zhǎotán Jiēdào	ᠵᠣᠤ ᠲᠠᠨ ᠵᠡᠭᠡᠯᠢ ᠭᠤᠳᠤᠮᠵᠢ	Жуу дан зээл гудамж	150203003
Linyin Road Subdistrict	林荫路街道	Línyīnlù Jiēdào	ᠯᠢᠨ ᠶᠢᠨ ᠵᠠᠮ ᠤᠨ ᠵᠡᠭᠡᠯᠢ ᠭᠤᠳᠤᠮᠵᠢ	Лин ин замын зээл гудамж	150203004
Youyi Avenue Subdistrict	友谊大街街道	Yǒuyìdàjiē Jiēdào	ᠶᠢᠦ ᠢ ᠶᠡᠬᠡ ᠵᠡᠭᠡᠯᠢ ᠭᠤᠳᠤᠮᠵᠢ	Еү И их зээл гудамж	150203005
Arad Avenue Subdistrict	阿尔丁大街街道	Ā'ěrdīngdàjiē Jiēdào	ᠠᠷᠠᠳ ᠵᠡᠭᠡᠯᠢ ᠭᠤᠳᠤᠮᠵᠢ	Ард зээл гудамж	150203006
Tuanjie Avenue Subdistrict	团结大街街道	Tuánjiédàjiē Jiēdào	ᠪᠦᠯᠬᠦᠮᠳᠡᠯ ᠶᠡᠬᠡ ᠵᠡᠭᠡᠯᠢ ᠶᠢᠨ ᠵᠡᠭᠡᠯᠢ ᠭᠤᠳᠤᠮᠵᠢ	Бүлгэмдэл их зээлийн зээл гудамж	150203007
Anshan Road Subdistrict	鞍山道街道	Ānshāndào Jiēdào	ᠠᠨᠱᠠᠨ ᠵᠡᠭᠡᠯᠢ ᠭᠤᠳᠤᠮᠵᠢ	Аншин зээл гудамж	150203008
Qianjin Road Subdistrict	前进道街道	Qiánjìndào Jiēdào	ᠴᠢᠶᠠᠨ ᠵᠢᠨ ᠵᠠᠮ ᠤᠨ ᠵᠡᠭᠡᠯᠢ ᠭᠤᠳᠤᠮᠵᠢ	Чонгийн замын зээл гудамж	150203009
Shifu East Road Subdistrict	市府东路街道	Shìfǔdōnglù Jiēdào	ᠬᠣᠲᠠ ᠶᠢᠨ ᠵᠠᠰᠠᠭ ᠤᠨ ᠣᠷᠳᠣᠨ ᠤ ᠵᠡᠭᠦᠨ ᠵᠠᠮ ᠤᠨ ᠵᠡᠭᠡᠯᠢ ᠭᠤᠳᠤᠮᠵᠢ	Хотын засгийн ордны зүүн замын зээл гудамж	150203010
Baiyun Road Subdistrict	白云路街道	Báiyúnlù Jiēdào	ᠪᠠᠶᠠᠨ ᠵᠠᠮ ᠤᠨ ᠵᠡᠭᠡᠯᠢ ᠭᠤᠳᠤᠮᠵᠢ	Баян замын зээл гудамж	150203011
Huanghe West Road Subdistrict	黄河西路街道	Huánghéxīlù Jiēdào	ᠬᠠᠲᠤᠨ ᠭᠣᠣᠯ ᠪᠠᠷᠠᠭᠤᠨ ᠵᠠᠮ ᠤᠨ ᠵᠡᠭᠡᠯᠢ ᠭᠤᠳᠤᠮᠵᠢ	Хатан гол баруун замын зээл гудамж	150203012
Kungong Road Subdistrict	昆工路街道	Kūngōnglù Jiēdào	ᠺᠦᠨ ᠭᠦᠩ ᠵᠠᠮ ᠤᠨ ᠵᠡᠭᠡᠯᠢ ᠭᠤᠳᠤᠮᠵᠢ	Кун хүн замын зээл гудамж	150203013
Kunbei Subdistrict	昆北街道	Kūnběi Jiēdào	ᠺᠦᠨ ᠪᠧᠢ ᠵᠡᠭᠡᠯᠢ ᠭᠤᠳᠤᠮᠵᠢ	Кун бей зээл гудамж	150203014
Towns
Kunhe Town	昆河镇	Kūnhé Zhèn	ᠺᠦᠨ ᠾᠧ ᠪᠠᠯᠭᠠᠰᠤ (ᠬᠥᠨᠳᠡᠯᠡᠨ ᠭᠣᠣᠯ ᠪᠠᠯᠭᠠᠰᠤ)	Кун ге балгас (Хөндлөн гол балгас)	150203100
Burhant Town	卜尔汉图镇	Bǔ'ěrhàntú Zhèn	ᠪᠤᠷᠬᠠᠨᠲᠤ ᠪᠠᠯᠭᠠᠰᠤ	Бурхант балгас	150203102

Other:

- Bao Gang Factory Area Agency (包钢厂区办事处)

== References and Notes ==
- www.xzqh.org (in Chinese)
