= Qingshuihe County =

Qingshuihe County 清水河县 • ᠴᠢᠩ ᠱᠦᠢ ᠾᠧ ᠰᠢᠶᠠᠨ Tsingshuiho
- County
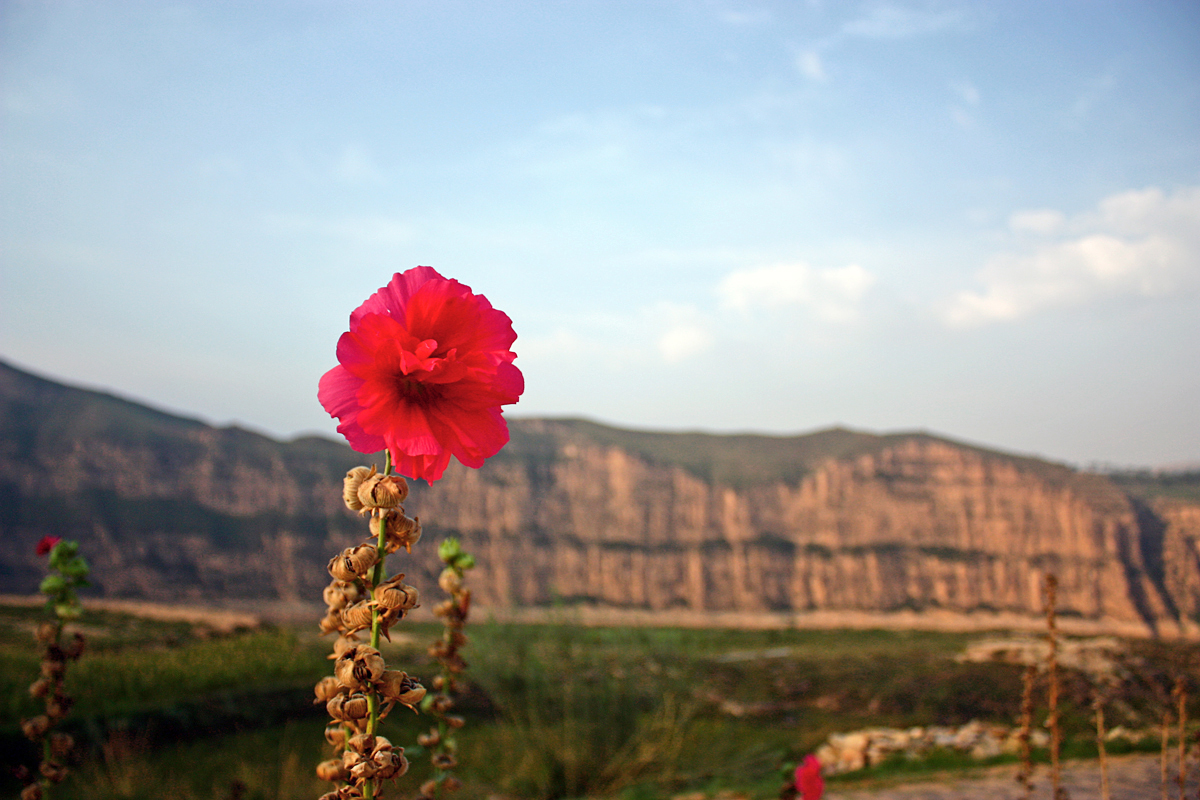
- Laoniuwan in the south of the county

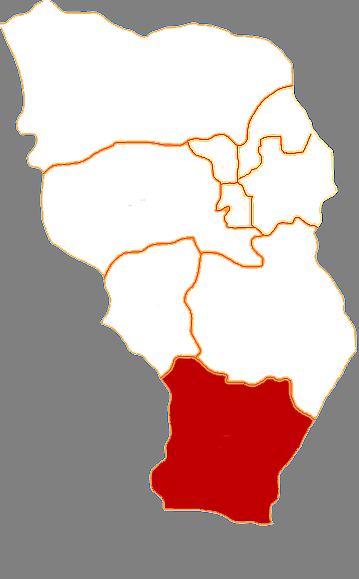
- Map showing Qingshuihe County in Hohhot City, Inner Mongolia, China

- Location in Inner Mongolia Qingshuihe (China)
- Coordinates: 39°55′N 111°41′E
- Country: China
- Autonomous region: Inner Mongolia
- Prefecture-level city: Hohhot
- County seat: Chengguan Town

Area
  - Total: 2,807 km^{2} (1,084 sq mi)
- Elevation: 1,164 m (3,819 ft)

Population (2020)
  - Total: 76,674
  - Density: 27.32/km^{2} (70.75/sq mi)
- Time zone: UTC+8 (China Standard)
- Website: www.qingshuihe.gov.cn

Qingshuihe County

Chinese name
- Simplified Chinese: 清水河县
- Traditional Chinese: 清水河縣
Transcriptions
Standard Mandarin
- Hanyu Pinyin: Qīngshuǐhé Xiàn

Mongolian name
- Mongolian Cyrillic: Чиншуйхө шянь
- Mongolian script: ᠴᠢᠩ ᠱᠦᠢ ᠾᠧ ᠰᠢᠶᠠᠨ
Transcriptions
- SASM/GNC: Čiŋ šüi hė siyan

Qingshuihe County (Mongolian: ᠴᠢᠩ ᠱᠦᠢ ᠾᠧ ᠰᠢᠶᠠᠨ; Chinese: 清水河县) is a county of Inner Mongolia Autonomous Region, North China, it is under the administration of the prefecture-level city of Hohhot, the capital of the autonomous region, bordering Shanxi province to the south and east. It is the southernmost county-level division of the regional capital of Hohhot, which lies more than 100 kilometres (62 mi) to the north.

In 2005, the county council started development on a new city, 20 kilometres (12 mi) north of the existing town of Qingshuihe, closer to Hohhot. Chinese media reports said the scheme would have cost more than $6b yuan ($880m, £610m) in total, many times more than the county government's annual expenditure. The council expected either local, regional or national help to complete the project, but this was not approved. In 2007, money for the project ran out, and development stopped, leaving both a half-developed and unoccupied city, as well as a lack of finances and resource to maintain the existing town.

== Administrative divisions ==
Horinger County is made up of 4 towns and 4 townships.

Name	Simplified Chinese	Hanyu Pinyin	Mongolian (Hudum Script)	Mongolian (Cyrillic)	Administrative division code
Towns
Chengguan Town	城关镇	Chéngguān Zhèn	ᠴᠧᠩ ᠭᠤᠸᠠᠨ ᠪᠠᠯᠭᠠᠰᠤ	Цэн гуан балгас	150124100
Honghe Town	宏河镇	Hónghé Zhèn	ᠬᠤᠩ ᠾᠧ ᠪᠠᠯᠭᠠᠰᠤ	Хон ге балгас	150124101
Lamawan Town	喇嘛湾镇	Lǎmawān Zhèn	ᠯᠠᠮ ᠶᠢᠨ ᠲᠣᠬᠣᠢ ᠪᠠᠯᠭᠠᠰᠤ	Ламийн духай балгас	150124102
Laoniuwan Town	老牛湾镇	Lǎoniúwān Zhèn	ᠯᠣᠣ ᠨᠢᠦ ᠸᠠᠨ ᠪᠠᠯᠭᠠᠰᠤ	Луу нүү ван балгас	150124103
Townships
Yaogou Township	窑沟乡	Yáogōu Xiāng	ᠶᠣᠣ ᠭᠧᠦ ᠰᠢᠶᠠᠩ	Ёо гүү шиян	150124200
Beibu Township	北堡乡	Běibǔ Xiāng	ᠪᠧᠢ ᠪᠣᠣ ᠰᠢᠶᠠᠩ	Бей буу шиян	150124201
Jiucaizhuang Township	韭菜庄乡	Jiǔcàizhuāng Xiāng	ᠵᠢᠦ ᠼᠠᠢ ᠵᠤᠸᠠᠩ ᠰᠢᠶᠠᠩ	Жүү цай зуван шиян	150124202
Uliyastai Township	五良太乡	Wǔliángtài Xiāng	ᠤᠯᠢᠶᠠᠰᠤᠲᠠᠢ ᠰᠢᠶᠠᠩ	Улиастай шиян	150124203

Other:

- Inner Mongolia Qingshuihe Industrial Park (内蒙古清水河工业园区, ᠴᠢᠩ ᠱᠦᠢ ᠾᠧ ᠰᠢᠶᠠᠨ ᠤ ᠠᠵᠤ ᠦᠢᠯᠡᠳᠪᠦᠷᠢ ᠶᠢᠨ ᠲᠣᠭᠣᠷᠢᠭ)

== Climate ==
Climate data for Qingshuihe, elevation 1,208 m (3,963 ft), (1991–2020 normals, extremes 1981–2010)
Month	Jan	Feb	Mar	Apr	May	Jun	Jul	Aug	Sep	Oct	Nov	Dec	Year
Record high °C (°F)	10.3 (50.5)	17.9 (64.2)	26.4 (79.5)	33.6 (92.5)	33.8 (92.8)	40.3 (104.5)	39.3 (102.7)	35.0 (95.0)	33.7 (92.7)	26.4 (79.5)	19.3 (66.7)	15.5 (59.9)	40.3 (104.5)
Mean daily maximum °C (°F)	−3.1 (26.4)	1.9 (35.4)	9.1 (48.4)	17.2 (63.0)	23.2 (73.8)	27.7 (81.9)	29.3 (84.7)	27.2 (81.0)	22.1 (71.8)	14.9 (58.8)	6.1 (43.0)	−1.5 (29.3)	14.5 (58.1)
Daily mean °C (°F)	−10.1 (13.8)	−5.3 (22.5)	2.2 (36.0)	10.1 (50.2)	16.6 (61.9)	21.2 (70.2)	23.1 (73.6)	20.9 (69.6)	15.5 (59.9)	8.1 (46.6)	−0.2 (31.6)	−7.8 (18.0)	7.9 (46.2)
Mean daily minimum °C (°F)	−15.4 (4.3)	−10.9 (12.4)	−3.7 (25.3)	3.4 (38.1)	9.7 (49.5)	14.7 (58.5)	17.3 (63.1)	15.5 (59.9)	10.0 (50.0)	2.8 (37.0)	−4.9 (23.2)	−12.6 (9.3)	2.2 (35.9)
Record low °C (°F)	−29.1 (−20.4)	−25.0 (−13.0)	−20.1 (−4.2)	−10.3 (13.5)	−2.2 (28.0)	1.4 (34.5)	0.0 (32.0)	4.7 (40.5)	−2.4 (27.7)	−9.8 (14.4)	−21.8 (−7.2)	−31.3 (−24.3)	−31.3 (−24.3)
Average precipitation mm (inches)	2.8 (0.11)	4.2 (0.17)	8.8 (0.35)	22.6 (0.89)	38.6 (1.52)	52.5 (2.07)	110.0 (4.33)	93.3 (3.67)	56.8 (2.24)	27.3 (1.07)	9.6 (0.38)	2.6 (0.10)	429.1 (16.9)
Average precipitation days (≥ 0.1 mm)	2.9	3.4	4.1	5.0	6.7	10.2	12.2	11.2	9.7	6.0	3.8	2.8	78
Average snowy days	4.6	4.9	3.9	1.4	0.3	0	0	0	0	0.9	3.5	4.8	24.3
Average relative humidity (%)	56	48	40	36	38	46	58	63	60	56	54	54	51
Mean monthly sunshine hours	217.4	219.5	257.2	274.6	293.4	269.6	250.3	243.7	225.8	233.0	207.9	205.0	2,897.4
Percentage possible sunshine	72	72	69	69	66	60	56	58	61	68	70	71	66
Source: China Meteorological Administration
