= Qingshan District, Baotou =

Qingshan 青山区 • ᠴᠢᠩᠱᠠᠨ ᠲᠣᠭᠣᠷᠢᠭ
- District
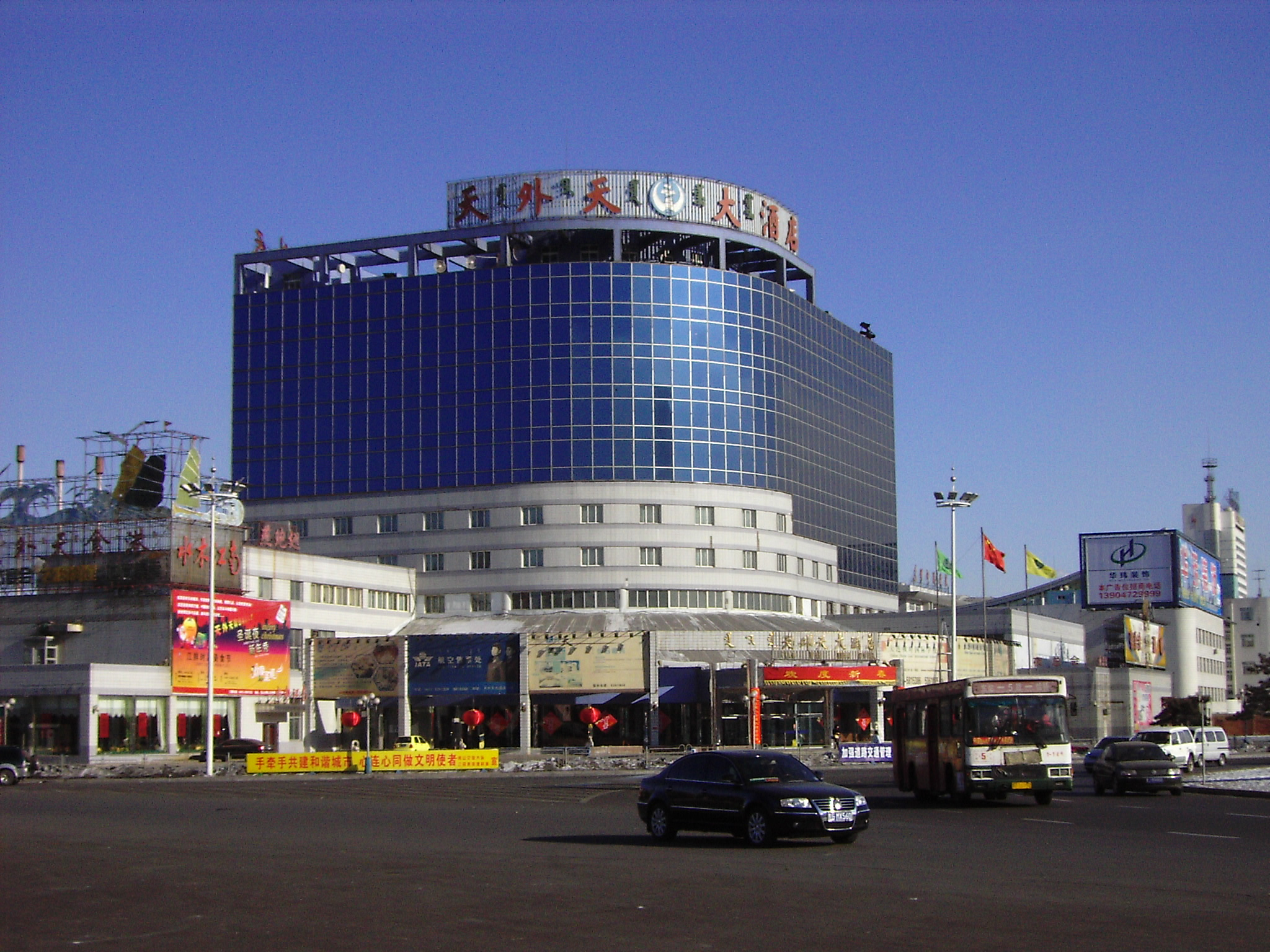

- Location within Inner Mongolia Location within China
- Country: China
- Autonomous region: Inner Mongolia
- Prefecture-level city: Baotou
- District seat: Qingfu

Area
  - Total: 283.0 km^{2} (109.3 sq mi)

Population (2020)
  - Total: 719,255
  - Density: 2,542/km^{2} (6,583/sq mi)
- Time zone: UTC+8 (China Standard)
- Website: www.qsq.gov.cn

Qingshan District, Baotou

Chinese name
- Simplified Chinese: 青山区
- Traditional Chinese: 青山區
Transcriptions
Standard Mandarin
- Hanyu Pinyin: Qīngshān Qū

Mongolian name
- Mongolian Cyrillic: Чинсань дүүрэг
- Mongolian script: ᠴᠢᠩᠱᠠᠨ ᠲᠣᠭᠣᠷᠢᠭ
Transcriptions
- SASM/GNC: Čiŋšan toɣoriɣ

Qingshan District (Mongolian: ᠴᠢᠩᠱᠠᠨ ᠲᠣᠭᠣᠷᠢᠭ; Chinese: 青山区) is a district of the city of Baotou, Inner Mongolia, China.

== Administrative divisions ==
Qingshan District is made up of 9 subdistricts and 3 towns.

Name	Simplified Chinese	Hanyu Pinyin	Mongolian (Hudum Script)	Mongolian (Cyrillic)	Administrative division code
Subdistricts
Xianfeng Road Subdistrict	先锋道街道	Xiānfēngdào Jiēdào	ᠬᠣᠰᠢᠭᠤᠴᠢ ᠵᠠᠮ ᠤᠨ ᠵᠡᠭᠡᠯᠢ ᠭᠤᠳᠤᠮᠵᠢ	Хошууч замын зээл гудамж	150204001
Xingfu Road Subdistrict	幸福路街道	Xìngfúlù Jiēdào	ᠰᠢᠩ ᠹᠦ᠋ ᠵᠠᠮ ᠤᠨ ᠵᠡᠭᠡᠯᠢ ᠭᠤᠳᠤᠮᠵᠢ	Шин фү замын зээл гудамж	150204002
Wanqing Road Subdistrict	万青路街道	Wànqīnglù Jiēdào	ᠥᠩᠭᠡᠴᠢᠯ ᠵᠠᠮ ᠤᠨ ᠵᠡᠭᠡᠯᠢ ᠭᠤᠳᠤᠮᠵᠢ	Өнхчил замын зээл гудамж	150204003
Fuqiang Road Subdistrict	富强路街道	Fùqiánglù Jiēdào	ᠬᠦᠴᠦᠷᠬᠡᠭᠵᠢᠯ ᠵᠠᠮ ᠤᠨ ᠵᠡᠭᠡᠯᠢ ᠭᠤᠳᠤᠮᠵᠢ	Хүчирхэгжил замын зээл гудамж	150204004
Kexue Road Subdistrict	科学路街道	Kēxuélù Jiēdào	ᠰᠢᠨᠵᠢᠯᠡᠬᠦᠢ ᠤᠬᠠᠭᠠᠨ ᠵᠠᠮ ᠤᠨ ᠵᠡᠭᠡᠯᠢ ᠭᠤᠳᠤᠮᠵᠢ	Шинжлэхүй ухаан замын зээл гудамж	150204005
Qingshan Road Subdistrict	青山路街道	Qīngshānlù Jiēdào	ᠴᠢᠩᠱᠠᠨ ᠵᠠᠮ ᠤᠨ ᠵᠡᠭᠡᠯᠢ ᠭᠤᠳᠤᠮᠵᠢ	Чаншин замын зээл гудамж	150204006
Ziyou Road Subdistrict	自由路街道	Zìyóulù Jiēdào	ᠴᠢᠯᠥᠭᠡᠲᠦ ᠵᠠᠮ ᠤᠨ ᠵᠡᠭᠡᠯᠢ ᠭᠤᠳᠤᠮᠵᠢ	Чөлөөт замын зээл гудамж	150204007
Ust Subdistrict	乌素图街道	Wūsùtú Jiēdào	ᠤᠰᠤᠲᠤ ᠵᠡᠭᠡᠯᠢ ᠭᠤᠳᠤᠮᠵᠢ	Уст зээл гудамж	150204008
Towns
Qingfu Town	青福镇	Qīngfú Zhèn	ᠴᠢᠩ ᠹᠦ᠋ ᠪᠠᠯᠭᠠᠰᠤ	Чин фү балгас	150204100
Xingsheng Town	兴胜镇	Xīngshèng Zhèn	ᠰᠢᠩ ᠱᠧᠩ ᠪᠠᠯᠭᠠᠰᠤ	Шин шен балгас	150204101

Other:

- Baotou Equipment Manufacturing Industrial Park (包头市装备制造产业园区)
