= Shangdu County =

Shangdu County 商都县 • ᠱᠠᠩᠳᠤ ᠰᠢᠶᠠᠨ
- County
- Location in Inner Mongolia Shangdu (China)
- Coordinates: 41°34′N 113°35′E
- Country: China
- Autonomous region: Inner Mongolia
- Prefecture-level city: Ulanqab
- County seat: Qitai

Area
  - Total: 4,353 km^{2} (1,681 sq mi)
- Elevation: 1,381 m (4,531 ft)

Population (2020)
  - Total: 173,926
  - Density: 39.96/km^{2} (103.5/sq mi)
- Time zone: UTC+8 (China Standard)
- Postal code: 013450
- Website: www.shangdu.gov.cn

Shangdu County

Chinese name
- Simplified Chinese: 商都县
- Traditional Chinese: 商都縣
Transcriptions
Standard Mandarin
- Hanyu Pinyin: Shāngdū Xiàn

Mongolian name
- Mongolian Cyrillic: Шанду шянь
- Mongolian script: ᠱᠠᠩᠳᠤ ᠰᠢᠶᠠᠨ
Transcriptions
- SASM/GNC: Šaŋdu siyan

Ulanqab, Inner Mongolia China - Planet Labs satellite image

Shangdu County (Mongolian: ᠱᠠᠩᠳᠤ ᠰᠢᠶᠠᠨ; Chinese: 商都县) is a county of south-central Inner Mongolia, China. It is under the administration of Ulanqab City and has an area of 4,353 square kilometres (1,681 sq mi), and in 2020 had about 173,000 inhabitants.

== Administrative divisions ==
Shangdu County is made up of 6 towns and 4 townships.

Name	Simplified Chinese	Hanyu Pinyin	Mongolian (Hudum Script)	Mongolian (Cyrillic)	Mongolian (Romanized)	Administrative division code
Towns
Qitai Town	七台镇	Qītái Zhèn	ᠴᠢ ᠲᠠᠢ ᠪᠠᠯᠭᠠᠰᠤ	Читэй балгас	Chitey balgas	150923101
Shibaqing Town	十八顷镇	Shíbāqǐng Zhèn	ᠱᠢ ᠪᠠ ᠴᠢᠩ ᠪᠠᠯᠭᠠᠰᠤ	Ши ба чин балгас	Shi ba chin balgas	150923102
Ih Haxat Town	大黑沙土镇	Dàhēishātǔ Zhèn	ᠶᠡᠬᠡ ᠬᠠᠰᠢᠶᠠᠲᠤ ᠪᠠᠯᠭᠠᠰᠤ	Их хашаат балгас	Ih hashaat balgas	150923103
Xijingzi Town	西井子镇	Xījǐngzǐ Zhèn	ᠰᠢ ᠵᠢᠩ ᠽᠢ ᠪᠠᠯᠭᠠᠰᠤ	Ший жин зи балгас	Shiy zhin zi balgas	150923104
Tunkendui Town	屯垦队镇	Túnkěnduì Zhèn	ᠲᠦᠨ ᠺᠧᠨ ᠳᠦᠢ ᠪᠠᠯᠭᠠᠰᠤ	Түн кен дүй балгас	Tün ken düy balgas	150923105
Xiaohaizi Town	小海子镇	Xiǎohǎizi Zhèn	ᠰᠢᠶᠣᠤ ᠬᠠᠢ ᠽᠢ ᠪᠠᠯᠭᠠᠰᠤ	Шяо хай зи балгас	Shyao hay zi balgas	150923106
Townships
Ih Hure Township	大库伦乡	Dàkùlún Xiāng	ᠶᠡᠬᠡᠬᠦ᠋ᠷᠢᠶ᠎ᠡ ᠰᠢᠶᠠᠩ	Ихүүрээ шиян	Ihüüree shiyan	150923200
Mod Township	卯都乡	Mǎodū Xiāng	ᠮᠣᠳᠣ ᠰᠢᠶᠠᠩ	Мод шиян	Mod shiyan	150923201
Bor Hujir Township	玻璃忽镜乡	Bōlíhūjìng Xiāng	ᠪᠣᠷᠣ ᠬᠤᠵᠢᠷ ᠰᠢᠶᠠᠩ	Бор хужир шиян	Bor huzhir shiyan	150923202
Sandaqing Township	三大顷乡	Sāndàqǐng Xiāng	ᠰᠠᠨ ᠳ᠋ᠠ ᠴᠢᠩ ᠰᠢᠶᠠᠩ	Сан да чин шиян	San da chin shiyan	150923203

== Climate ==
Climate data for Shangdu, elevation 1,420 m (4,660 ft), (1991–2020 normals, extremes 1981–2010)
Month	Jan	Feb	Mar	Apr	May	Jun	Jul	Aug	Sep	Oct	Nov	Dec	Year
Record high °C (°F)	8.5 (47.3)	14.4 (57.9)	20.9 (69.6)	29.9 (85.8)	32.9 (91.2)	36.6 (97.9)	36.3 (97.3)	34.6 (94.3)	32.6 (90.7)	25.7 (78.3)	17.8 (64.0)	12.4 (54.3)	36.6 (97.9)
Mean daily maximum °C (°F)	−6.9 (19.6)	−2.2 (28.0)	5.2 (41.4)	13.6 (56.5)	20.3 (68.5)	24.8 (76.6)	26.7 (80.1)	25.1 (77.2)	20.0 (68.0)	12.1 (53.8)	2.5 (36.5)	−5.1 (22.8)	11.3 (52.4)
Daily mean °C (°F)	−13.7 (7.3)	−9.5 (14.9)	−2.1 (28.2)	6.3 (43.3)	13.4 (56.1)	18.2 (64.8)	20.5 (68.9)	18.7 (65.7)	13.0 (55.4)	5.0 (41.0)	−4.2 (24.4)	−11.4 (11.5)	4.5 (40.1)
Mean daily minimum °C (°F)	−18.8 (−1.8)	−15.3 (4.5)	−8.3 (17.1)	−0.5 (31.1)	6.4 (43.5)	11.6 (52.9)	14.6 (58.3)	12.7 (54.9)	6.7 (44.1)	−0.7 (30.7)	−9.2 (15.4)	−16.3 (2.7)	−1.4 (29.5)
Record low °C (°F)	−30.6 (−23.1)	−30.7 (−23.3)	−25.2 (−13.4)	−13.5 (7.7)	−6.7 (19.9)	0.2 (32.4)	5.8 (42.4)	0.5 (32.9)	−6.1 (21.0)	−15.7 (3.7)	−28.9 (−20.0)	−29.9 (−21.8)	−30.7 (−23.3)
Average precipitation mm (inches)	1.8 (0.07)	2.8 (0.11)	5.2 (0.20)	16.0 (0.63)	31.3 (1.23)	45.7 (1.80)	94.2 (3.71)	59.7 (2.35)	43.7 (1.72)	20.3 (0.80)	6.2 (0.24)	2.1 (0.08)	329 (12.94)
Average precipitation days (≥ 0.1 mm)	2.1	2.7	3.4	4.5	7.2	10.3	12.7	10.0	8.7	5.2	3.7	2.4	72.9
Average snowy days	3.3	4.1	4.6	3.0	0.4	0	0	0	0.3	1.8	5.1	4.3	26.9
Average relative humidity (%)	65	58	48	41	43	54	65	66	61	57	60	64	57
Mean monthly sunshine hours	212.0	214.3	258.9	265.6	288.6	269.6	264.5	259.3	237.4	239.9	202.6	197.9	2,910.6
Percentage possible sunshine	71	71	69	66	64	60	58	61	64	71	70	70	66
Source: China Meteorological Administration
