= SASM/GNC romanization =

Romanization systems used in China

The former State Administration of Surveying and Mapping, Geographical Names Committee and former Script Reform Committee of the People's Republic of China have adopted several romanizations for Chinese, Mongolian, Tibetan and Uyghur, officially known as pinyin, Regulation of Phonetic Transcription in Hanyu Pinyin Letters of Place Names in Minority Nationality Languages and Orthography of Chinese Personal Name in Hanyu Pinyin Letters. These systems may be referred to as SASM/GNC/SRC transcriptions or SASM/GNC romanizations.

These romanization systems have been used for foreign translations of Chinese personal names and toponyms since 1978.

All schemes except pinyin have a strict form and a broad form, where the broad form is used in general. In the case of pinyin, tone marks are omitted in practice.

== Chinese ==
Hanyu Pinyin is used for the romanization of Chinese; however, the tone marks are omitted in the broad sense and included in the strict sense.

== Mongolian ==
=== Scheme ===
Mongolian	extended IPA	SASM/GNC/SRC (broad)	SASM/GNC/SRC (strict)
ᠠ	a	a	a
ᠪ	p˭	b	b
ᠼ	tsʰ	c	c
ᠳ᠊ ᠳ	t˭	d	d
ᠡ	ə	e	e
ᠹ	f	f	f
ᠭ ᠭ‍	k˭	g	g
ᠬ ᠬ‍	x	h	h
ᠢ	i	i	i
ᠵ	tʃ˭	j	j
ᠺ	kʰ	k	k
ᠯ	l	l	l
ᠮ	m	m	m
ᠨ	n	n	n
ᠥ	o	o	o
ᠫ	pʰ	p	p
ᠴ	tʃʰ	q	q
ᠷ	r	r	r
ᠰ	s	s	s
ᠲ	tʰ	t	t
ᠦ	u	u	u
ᠸ	w	w	w
ᠱ	ʃ	x	x
ᠶ	j	y	y
ᠽ	ts˭	z	z
ᠣ	ɔ	o	ô
ᠤ	ʊ	u	û

Though Mongolian script is listed within the standard, it is still a phonetic transcription based on the Qahar dialect. For example, ᠤᠯᠠᠭᠠᠨᠬᠠᠳᠠ ᠬᠣᠲᠠ is not transcribed as Ûlaganhada hôta but rather Ûlaanhad hôt (strict) or Ulanhad hot (broad).

Though it is recommended within the standard the strict transcription to use the system when transcribing place names and broad transcription is recommended for general use, strict transcription is rarely used in practice, e.g. Hohhot rather than Hohhôt. In certain occasions, the SASM/GNC/SRC romanization of Mongolian is even fused with Hanyu pinyin, such as Huhhot or Huhehot.

=== Examples ===
Mongolian	SASM/GNC/SRC (strict)	SASM/GNC/SRC (broad)	Scientific	Cyrillic	Common transcription of Cyrillic
ᠬᠥᠬᠡᠬᠣᠲᠠ	Hohhôt	Hohhot	Kökeqota	Хөххот	Khökhkhot
ᠤᠯᠠᠭᠠᠨᠬᠠᠳᠠ ᠬᠣᠲᠠ	Ûlaanhad hôt	Ulanhad hot	Ulaɣanqada qota	Улаанхад хот	Ulaankhad khot
ᠡᠷᠢᠶᠡᠨ ᠬᠣᠲᠠ	Ereen hôt	Eren hot	Eriyen qota	Эрээн хот	Ereen khot
ᠰ‍‍ᠢᠯᠢ ᠶᠢᠨ ᠭᠣᠤᠯ	Xiliin gôl	Xilin gol	Sili-yin ɣoul	Шилийн гол	Shiliin gol (Shiliyn gol)
ᠠᠯᠠᠱᠠ	Alxaa	Alxa	Alaša	Алшаа	Alshaa
ᠴᠠᠬᠠᠷ	Qahar	Qahar	Čaqar	Цахар	Tsakhar
ᠴᠠᠭᠠᠨ	Qagaan	Qagan	Čaɣan	Цагаан	Tsagaan
ᠴᠢᠩᠭᠢᠰ ᠬᠠᠭᠠᠨ	Qingis Haan	Qingis Han	Činggis Qaɣan	Чингис Хаан	Chingis Khaan
ᠬᠢᠲᠠᠳ ᠤᠳ	Hitdûûd	Hitdud	Kitad-ud	Хятадууд	Khyataduud
ᠠᠭᠠᠷᠤ	agarûû	agaru	aɣaru	агруу	agruu
ᠪᠤᠭᠤᠲᠤ	Bûgt	Bugt	Buɣutu	Бугат	Bugat
ᠪᠤᠭᠤᠲᠤ	Bûût	But	Buɣutu	Бугат	Bugat
ᠪᠢᠷᠠᠭᠤ	Birag	Birag	Biraɣu	Бяруу	Byaruu
ᠪᠠᠷᠭᠠ	Barag	Barag	Barɣu	Барга	Barga
ᠪᠤᠷᠢᠶᠠᠳ	Bûriyad	Buriad	Buriyad	Буриад	Buriad
ᠪᠤᠷᠢᠶᠠᠳ	Bûryaad	Buryad	Buriyad	Буряад	Buryaad
ᠳᠥᠷᠪᠡᠳ	Dorbod	Dorbod	Dörbed	Дөрвөд	Dörvöd
ᠣᠩᠨᠢᠭᠤᠳ	Ôngniûd	Ongniud	Ongniɣud	Онниуд	Onniud

Characters labeled as red in SASM/GNC/SRC strict and Cyrillic Mongolian are not mutually isomorphic. This may be caused by dialectal difference (Chakhar and Khalkha) or different interpretation of the concept phonetical and phonemical. Characters labeled as green in SASM/GNC/SRC strict and Traditional Mongolian are not mutually equivalent.

== Uyghur ==
The SASM/GNC/SRC romanization system for the Uyghur language is based on Uyghur New script (commonly known as Yengi Yeziⱪ or Uyghur Pinyin Yëziqi), since at the time it devised Uyghur New script was the official orthography of the Uyghur language in China.

=== Scheme ===
- UEY – Uyghur Arabic script (Uyghur Ereb Yëziqi)
- UKY – Uyghur Cyrillic alphabet (Uyghur Kiril Yëziqi)
- ULY – Uyghur Latin script (Uyghur Latin Yëziqi)
- UYY – Uyghur New script (Uyghur Yëngi Yëziqi)
- broad – SASM/GNC/SRC broad
- strict – SASM/GNC/SRC strict

UEY	ISO 233	IPA	UKY	ULY	UYY	broad	strict
ا, ئا		a	я, a	a	a	a	a
ب		b	б	b	b	b	b
تس		tsʰ	ц	ts	c	c	c
د		d	д	d	d	d	d
ې, ئې		e	е	ë	e	e	ê
ف		f	ф	f	f	f	f
گ		ɡ	г	g	g	g	g
خ		x	х	x	h	h	h
ئى ,ى		i	и	i	i	i	i
ج		dʒ	җ	j	j	j	j
ك		kʰ	к	k	k	k	k
ل		l	л	l	l	l	l
م		m	м	m	m	m	m
ن		n	н	n	n	n	n
و, ئو		o	о	o	o	o	o
پ		pʰ	п	p	p	p	p
چ		tʃʰ	ч	ch	q	q	q
ر		r	р	r	r	r	r
س		s	с	s	s	s	s
ت		tʰ	т	t	t	t	t
ۇ, ئۇ		u	ю, у	u	u	u	u
ۋ		v	в	w	v	v	v
ۋ		w	в	w	w	w	w
ش		ʃ	ш	sh	x	x	x
ي		j	й	y	y	y	y
ز		z	з	z	z	z	z
غ		ʁ	ғ	gh	ƣ	g	ĝ
ھ		h	Һ	h	ⱨ	h	ĥ
ق		qʰ	қ	q	ⱪ	k	k̂
ە, ئە		ɛ	ə	e	ə	a (e)	ä
ۆ, ئۆ		ø	ө	ö	ɵ	o	ö
ۈ, ئۈ		y	ү	ü	ü	ü	ü
ژ		ʒ	ж	zh	ⱬ	y (Initial) j (Coda)	ŷ (Initial) ĵ (Coda)
ڭ		ŋ	ң	ng	ng	ng	ng

== Non-SASM/GNC/SRC transcriptions and orthographies in China ==
=== Pinyin-based or pinyin-influenced ===
Romanizations such as Bbánlám pìngyīm and Guangdong Romanization, and orthographies such as the Zhuang alphabet (1982) and Yengi Yeziⱪ for Uyghur (Uyghur Pinyin Yëziqi), are not used for SASM/GNC/SRC transcriptions.

=== Non-SASM/GNC/SRC transcriptions used in China ===
Non-SASM/GNC/SRC transliterations may be used in China for scholarly purposes, and are promoted for those circumstances. For example, libraries in China use Wylie transliteration and scientific transcription to transcribe Tibetan and Mongolian book titles respectively within the library catalog.

Non-SASM/GNC/SRC transcriptions (e.g. the THDL), however, are not rather promoted.

=== Personal and place names from languages without SASM/GNC/SRC romanization ===
For personal and place names from languages without SASM/GNC/SRC romanization, the pinyin romanization of its transcription into Chinese characters are used. For example, Xishuangbanna is not transcribed as Sipsongpanna or Sibsongbanna.

The Oirat language, however, is transcribed from the corresponding Qahar dialect, since it is considered officially by the PRC government as a dialect of Mongolian.
