= Bao'anzhao Prison =

Prison in Inner Mongolia, China

- Location: Jalaid Banner, Hinggan League, Inner Mongolia, China
- Status: Operational
- Security class: Prison
- Opened: 1954

Bao'anzhao Prison (Chinese: 保安沼监狱; pinyin: Bǎo'ānzhǎo Jiānyù), formally the Inner Mongolia Autonomous Region Bao'anzhao Prison (内蒙古自治区保安沼监狱), is a prison in Jalaid Banner, Hinggan League, Inner Mongolia, China. The prison developed from the large agricultural laogai or labour-reform farm system established in the Bao'anzhao area during the 1950s.

== History ==
The Bao'anzhao area lies in Jalaid Banner near the confluence of the Chuo'er River and Nen River. According to the Bao'anzhao District People's Procuratorate, the wider Bao'anzhao region covers approximately 227 square kilometres (88 sq mi) and historically contained several prison farms administered by the Inner Mongolia prison authorities.

Preparations to develop a labour-reform farm in the area began in the early 1950s. In December 1954, the Inner Mongolia Autonomous Region Local State-owned Bao'anzhao Mechanised Farm (内蒙古自治区地方国营保安沼机耕农场) was formally established, with prisoner rehabilitation and agricultural production among its principal functions.

The Laogai Handbook, published by the Laogai Research Foundation, gives the institutional predecessor of Bao'anzhao Prison as the Inner Mongolia No. 4 Labour-Reform Detachment (内蒙古第四劳改队), established in 1953. According to the handbook, the unit moved from the Yiershi forest area to Bao'anzhao in 1954 to establish a labour-reform farm. It was renamed the Inner Mongolia No. 1 Labour-Reform Detachment (内蒙古第一劳改队) in 1989 and Bao'anzhao Prison in 1994.

The handbook described Bao'anzhao as the largest prison in Inner Mongolia at the time and reported that it controlled approximately 220 square kilometres (85 sq mi) of cultivated land. It stated that in 1990 the prison held 6,790 prisoners, including 140 women and 169 juvenile prisoners. These historical population figures originate from the Laogai Research Foundation and are not current prison population figures.

The wider Bao'anzhao prison-farm region also included Ulan Prison and Wutaqi Prison. According to the Laogai Handbook, in 2003 Bao'anzhao Farm, Ulan Farm and Wutaqi Farm were combined to form the Inner Mongolia Bao'anzhao Agriculture, Industry and Trade Co., Ltd. (内蒙古保安沼农工贸有限责任公司).

== Prison population ==
The prison remained substantially smaller in the 21st century than the population reported for 1990. In 2018, the Inner Mongolia People's Procuratorate reported that Bao'anzhao Prison held more than 1,600 prisoners. It stated that 44.6 percent of the prison population at the time was ethnically Mongolian.

== Prison farm and forced-labour finding ==
Agricultural enterprises have historically been associated with Bao'anzhao Prison and the neighbouring prison farms. The contemporary enterprise associated with the area is the Inner Mongolia Hengzheng Group Baoanzhao Agriculture, Industry, and Trade Co., Ltd. Government procurement records continue to associate the company and its agricultural projects with the Inner Mongolia Prison Administration and the prison farms in the Bao'anzhao region.

In May 2016, U.S. Customs and Border Protection (CBP) issued a withhold release order on stevia extracts and derivatives believed to have been produced using convict or forced labour by the Inner Mongolia Hengzheng Group Baoanzhao Agriculture, Industry, and Trade Co., Ltd. Following an investigation, CBP issued a formal finding in October 2020 that certain stevia products made by the company with convict, forced or indentured labour were being, or were likely to be, imported into the United States.

CBP stated that its investigation had found sufficient evidence to identify Baoanzhao as a "prison/forced labor facility". The finding identified the company under several alternative names, including Inner Mongolia Hengzheng Group Baoanzhao Agriculture and Trade Co., Ltd., Inner Mongolia Autonomous Region Prison Administration Bureau Baoanzhao Agriculture and Trade Co., Ltd., and Baoanzhao Prison Farm.

== See also ==
- List of prisons in Inner Mongolia
- Laogai
- Ulan Prison
- Wutaqi Prison
