= List of prisons in Inner Mongolia =

This is a list of prisons within Inner Mongolia region of the People's Republic of China.

== Inner Mongolia ==
=== Chifeng ===
		Prisons			
Name	Enterprise name	City/County/District	Village/Town	Established	Notes
Chifeng Prison	Inner Mongolia Aut. Region Chifeng Brickyard; Inner Mongolia Aut. Region Wanjie Stone and TimberFactory; Chifeng Tibetan Handicrafts Econ. & Trade Co. Ltd.; Chifeng Machine Works	Songshan District, Chifeng		1951	Sells overseas. On Dec. 23, 2004 held 1,030 inmates
Kelaqin Prison	Keaaqin Banner Lustrous Stone Mine	Harqin Banner, Chifeng	Sishijiazi		

=== Hohhot ===
		Prisons			
Name	Enterprise name	City/County/District	Village/Town	Established	Notes
Hohhot No. 1 Prison	Inner Mongolia Xinghua Machinery Plant; Xinghua Craft Products Factory; Xinghua Industrial Boiler Factory	Zhaojun Rd, Yuquan District	Xiaoheihe		3.2 km^{2}
Hohhot No. 2 Prison	Inner Mongolia Hohhot Xinghua Brickyard	Yuquan District	Xiaoheihe, Xicaiyuan	1980	Formerly Inner Mongolia Erdaohe Reeducation Through Labor
Hohhot No. 3 Prison		Togtoh County	Fengyan		Can house over 2,000 inmates
Hohhot No. 4 Prison		Saihan District	Qiaobao		For old, sick, weak, disabled inmates.
		Detention centers			
Name	Enterprise name	City/County/District	Village/Town	Established	Notes
Inner Mongolia Detention Center		Hohhot			
Hohhot No. 1 Detention Center		Hohhot			
Hohhot No. 2 Detention Center		Hohhot			
Hohhot No. 3 Detention Center		Hohhot			
Yuquan Detention Center		Yuquan District			
Huimin Detention Center		Huimin District			
Saihan Detention Center		Saihan District			
Qingshuihe Detention Center		Qingshuihe County			
Tumed Left Banner Detention Center		Tumed Left Banner			
Wuchuan Detention Center		Wuchuan County			
Horinger Detention Center		Horinger County			
Togtoh Detention Center		Togtoh County			
		Administrative Detention centers			
Name	Enterprise name	City/County/District	Village/Town	Established	Notes
Hohhot No. 1 Administrative Detention Center		Hohhot			
Hohhot No. 2 Administrative Detention Center		Hohhot			
Hohhot No. 3 Administrative Detention Center		Hohhot			

=== Ordos ===
		Prisons			
Name	Enterprise name	City/County/District	Village/Town	Established	Notes
Ordos Prison	Ordos City Xinxing Brickyard and Silicon Calcium Factory	Ordos City	Tongchuan	1983	Originally located at Sanqingdi Labor Reform Company in Shulinzhao Town, Dalad Banner, Yikezhao League
Ejin Horo Prison	Aut. Region Lijiata Coal Mine	Ordos City			In Bulian Mining Area, over 1,000 inmates
		Detention centers			
Name	Enterprise name	City/County/District	Village/Town	Established	Notes
Ejin Horo Banner Detention Center		Ejin Horo Banner			
Ordos Detention Center		Ordos			
Otog Front Banner Detention Center		Otog Front Banner			
Otog Banner Detention Center		Otog Banner			
Jungar Banner Detention Center		Jungar Banner			
Uxin Banner Detention Center		Uxin Banner			
Dalad Banner Detention Center		Dalad Banner			
Hanggin Banner Detention Center		Hanggin Banner			

Name	Enterprise name	City/County/District	Village/Town	Established	Notes
Bao'anzhao Prison	Bao'anzhao Farm (Inner Mongolia Bao'anzhao Agriculture and Labor Trading Co. Ltd.)				Likely largest prison in province. In 1990 held total of 6,790 inmates, of which 140 were women and 169 were juveniles.
Inner Mongolia Autonomuous Region Women's Prison	Inner Mongolia Xinghua Clothing Factory				
Inner Mongolia Provincial Juvenile Offender Detachment				1954	
Jilantai Prison	Jilantai Prison Coal Mine	Alxa League	Gulaben		
Salaqi Prison	Saxian Farm		Salaqi, Natai, Goumen	1959	
Tongliao City Prison				1984	
Ulan Prison	Ulan Farm	Bao'anzhao, Jalaid Banner, Hinggan League	Yinde'er		
Wutaqi Prison	Inner Mongolia Aut. Region Wutaqi Farm	Jalaid Banner, Hinggan League			
Xilin Hot Prison	Brickyard; Xilin Gol League Xilinhot Prison Coal Mine	Xilin Gol League			Area of 57 km^{2}

== Sources ==
- Laogai Handbook 2007-2008 (PDF) (in Chinese and English). Washington, D.C.: Laogai Research Foundation. October 2008. pp. 255–270. ISBN 978-1-931550-25-3.
