= Wang Bo (politician) =

Chinese politician

- 王波

Vice Chairperson of Inner Mongolia Autonomous Regional People's Congress
- In office January 2018 – January 2022
- Chairperson: Li Jiheng

Vice Chairman of Inner Mongolia Autonomous Regional People's Government
- In office November 2011 – January 2018
- Chairman: Bagatur; Bu Xiaolin

Mayor of Hohhot
- In office April 2010 – November 2011
- Party Secretary: Han Zhiran
- Preceded by: Tang Aijun
- Succeeded by: Qin Yi

Mayor of Bayannur
- In office February 2008 – April 2010
- Party Secretary: Wang Suyi
- Preceded by: Wang Suyi
- Succeeded by: He Yonglin

Personal details
- Born: October 1958 (age 67–68) Ongniud Banner, Inner Mongolia, China
- Party: Chinese Communist Party (1986–2024; expelled)
- Education: Shenyang University of Chemical Technology; Tianjin University; Central Party School of the Chinese Communist Party; Peking University

Wang Bo (Chinese: 王波; pinyin: Wáng Bō; born October 1958) is a former Chinese politician who spent his entire career in north China's Inner Mongolia Autonomous Region. He was investigated by China's top anti-graft agency in June 2024. He has been retired for 2 years. Previously he served as vice chairperson of Inner Mongolia Autonomous Regional People's Congress. He was a delegate to the 13th National People's Congress.

== Early life and education ==
Wang was born in Ongniud Banner, Inner Mongolia, in October 1958. He was a sent-down youth between September 1977 and April 1978. After resuming the college entrance examination, in 1978, he enrolled at Shenyang Institute of Chemical Technology (now Shenyang University of Chemical Technology), where he majored in chemical machinery. From 1992 to 1993 he did his postgraduate work at Tianjin University. He also studied at the Central Party School of the Chinese Communist Party, and earned a master's degree in business administration from Peking University in 2007.

== Career ==
Wang worked in government after university in 1982. He joined the Chinese Communist Party (CCP) in April 1986. In March 1987, he was transferred to Chifeng Municipal Labor Bureau, and eventually became deputy director in March 1991. He was appointed governor of Yuanbaoshan District in April 1995, concurrently serving as deputy party secretary. He was elevated to secretary-general of Chifeng in November 1998 and in March 2000 was admitted to member of the CCP Chifeng Committee, the city's top authority. He was vice mayor of Chifeng in September 2001 and subsequently deputy party secretary in March 2005.

Wang was made vice mayor of Baotou in October 2006 and was admitted to member of the CCP Baotou Municipal Committee, the city's top authority.

Wang became mayor of Bayannur in February 2008 before being assigned to the similar position in Hohhot in April 2010.

In November 2011, Wang took office as vice chairman of Inner Mongolia Autonomous Regional People's Government, and held that office until January 2018.

In January 2018, Wang was chosen as vice chairperson of Inner Mongolia Autonomous Regional People's Congress, serving in the post until his retirement in January 2022.

== Downfall ==
On 3 June 2024, Wang was put under investigation for alleged "serious violations of discipline and laws" by the Central Commission for Discipline Inspection (CCDI), the party's internal disciplinary body, and the National Supervisory Commission, the highest anti-corruption agency of China. On December 10, he was stripped of his posts within the CCP and in the public office. On December 18, he was arrested by the Supreme People's Procuratorate.

On 10 April 2025, Wang was indicted on suspicion of accepting bribes. On October 14, he was sentenced to death with a two-year reprieve for taking bribes exceeding 449 million yuan ($62.88 million) by the Yichang Intermediate People's Court in Hubei province. He was deprived of political rights for life and all his properties were also confiscated.

Party political offices
| Preceded by Wang Suyi | Mayor of Bayannur; 2008–2010 | Succeeded by He Yonglin |
Government offices
| Preceded by Tang Aijun | Mayor of Hohhot; 2010–2011 | Succeeded by Qin Yi |
