= Liu Zhengdong =

Chinese engineer (born 1966)

- Born: October 1966 (age 59); Tuquan County, Inner Mongolia, China
- Education: Tsinghua University; Central Iron and Steel Research Institute; University of British Columbia
- Spouse: Zhao Kui
- Scientific career
- Fields: Steel; Metallurgy
- Workplaces: China Iron & Steel Research Institute Group

Chinese name
- Traditional Chinese: 劉正東
- Simplified Chinese: 刘正东
Transcriptions
Standard Mandarin
- Hanyu Pinyin: Liǘ Zhèngdōng

Liu Zhengdong (Chinese: 刘正东; born October 1966) is a Chinese engineer currently serving as deputy chief engineer of China Iron & Steel Research Institute Group and chief specialist of Central Iron and Steel Research Institute.

== Biography ==
Liu was born in Tuquan County, Inner Mongolia, in October 1966. He took the National College Entrance Examination in 1985, and earned the highest marks in his home league Hinggan. He attended Tsinghua University where he received his bachelor's degree in metal pressure processing in 1990. After completing his master's degree in heat treatment of metal at Central Iron and Steel Research Institute, he attended the University of British Columbia where he obtained his doctor's degree in ferrous metallurgy in 2001. In 2001 he was offered a position at China Iron & Steel Research Institute Group.

== Personal life ==
Liu's wife named Zhao Kui (赵葵).

== Honours and awards ==
- January 9, 2015 State Science and Technology Progress Award (First Class)
- November 4, 2015 Science and Technology Innovation Award of the Ho Leung Ho Lee Foundation
- May 30, 2018 12th Guanghua Engineering Technology Award
- November 22, 2019 Member of the Chinese Academy of Engineering (CAE)
