= Tang Aijun =

Chinese politician

- 汤爱军

Mayor of Hohhot
- In office April 2005 – April 2010
- Preceded by: Liu Xiu
- Succeeded by: Wang Bo

Mayor of Hulunbuir
- In office March 2003 – January 2005
- Preceded by: Liang Tiecheng
- Succeeded by: Cao Zhenghai

County Governor of Tuquan County
- In office September 1990 – August 1992

Personal details
- Born: April 1950 (age 76) Tuquan County, Inner Mongolia, China
- Party: Chinese Communist Party (1972–2016; expelled)
- Education: Jilin University of Technology

Chinese name
- Traditional Chinese: 湯愛軍
- Simplified Chinese: 汤爱军
Transcriptions
Standard Mandarin
- Hanyu Pinyin: Tāng Àijūn

Tang Aijun (born April 1950) is a former Chinese politician from Inner Mongolia. Tang served as mayor of Hulunbuir, Inner Mongolia, from 2003 to 2005, and as mayor of the regional capital, Hohhot, from 2005 to 2010. As of August 2014 Tang is under investigation for alleged "serious violations of law and discipline."

== Early life and education ==
Tang was born and raised in Tuquan County of Hinggan League in Inner Mongolia, China. Tang graduated from Jilin University of Technology (Jilin University) in January 1977.

== Career ==
Tang started his career in politics in November 1970. Tang joined the Chinese Communist Party in October 1972.

Beginning in 1970, he served in several posts in Tuquan County, including worker, production team leader, and factory manager. In December 1983 he became the deputy county governor of Tuquan County, rising to county governor in 1990. In May 1997 he was transferred to Hulunbuir.

In March 2003, Tang was appointed as deputy party chief and mayor of Hulunbuir. In January 2005 he was transferred to work as mayor of Hohhot, the capital of Inner Mongolia, a position he held until 2010. Hohhot's economy grew steadily during Tang's tenure. By 2009, the city had one of the highest GDP per capita numbers of any provincial capital in China.

In a 2009 interview with China's national radio station, Tang said that he aimed to expand the financial sector of the city's economy, in addition to investing more in tourism. Tang aimed to make Hohhot a summer destination for tourists from the Beijing-Tianjin area, due to the latter's heat. In addition, he wanted to make Hohhot the centre of the dairy industry in China, as well as a prominent producer of silicon for use in solar panels. In 2008, during Tang's tenure, a deputy Party Secretary in charge of law enforcement, Wang Zhiping (王志平), was reportedly killed in his office along with a female tax official.

Tang left active politics in 2010 when he turned 60, the mandatory retirement age for officials of his rank. In the following years, he served in insignificant roles, such as member of the Standing Committee of the Inner Mongolia People's Congress, and also as the Chair of the Hohhot Philanthropic Organization.

== Downfall ==
On August 16, 2014, state media announced that Tang Aijun was being investigated by the Central Commission for Discipline Inspection of the Chinese Communist Party for "serious violations of laws and regulations".

He was detained by on January 26, 2015. The investigation took over one year.

Tang was expelled from the Communist Party in January 2016. It was said that he took "cash and gifts" and abused his power for the gain of others. On October 30, he received a sentence of 12 years in prison and fine of 1 million yuan for taking bribes. The money and property that he had received in the form of bribes will be turned over to the national treasury.

Government offices
Preceded by Liang Tiecheng	Mayor of Hulunbuir; 2003–2005	Succeeded by Cao Zhenghai
Preceded by Liu Xiu	Mayor of Hohhot; 2005–2010	Succeeded by Wang Bo
