= Arxan Yiershi Airport =

Arxan Yiershi Airport 阿尔山伊尔施机场
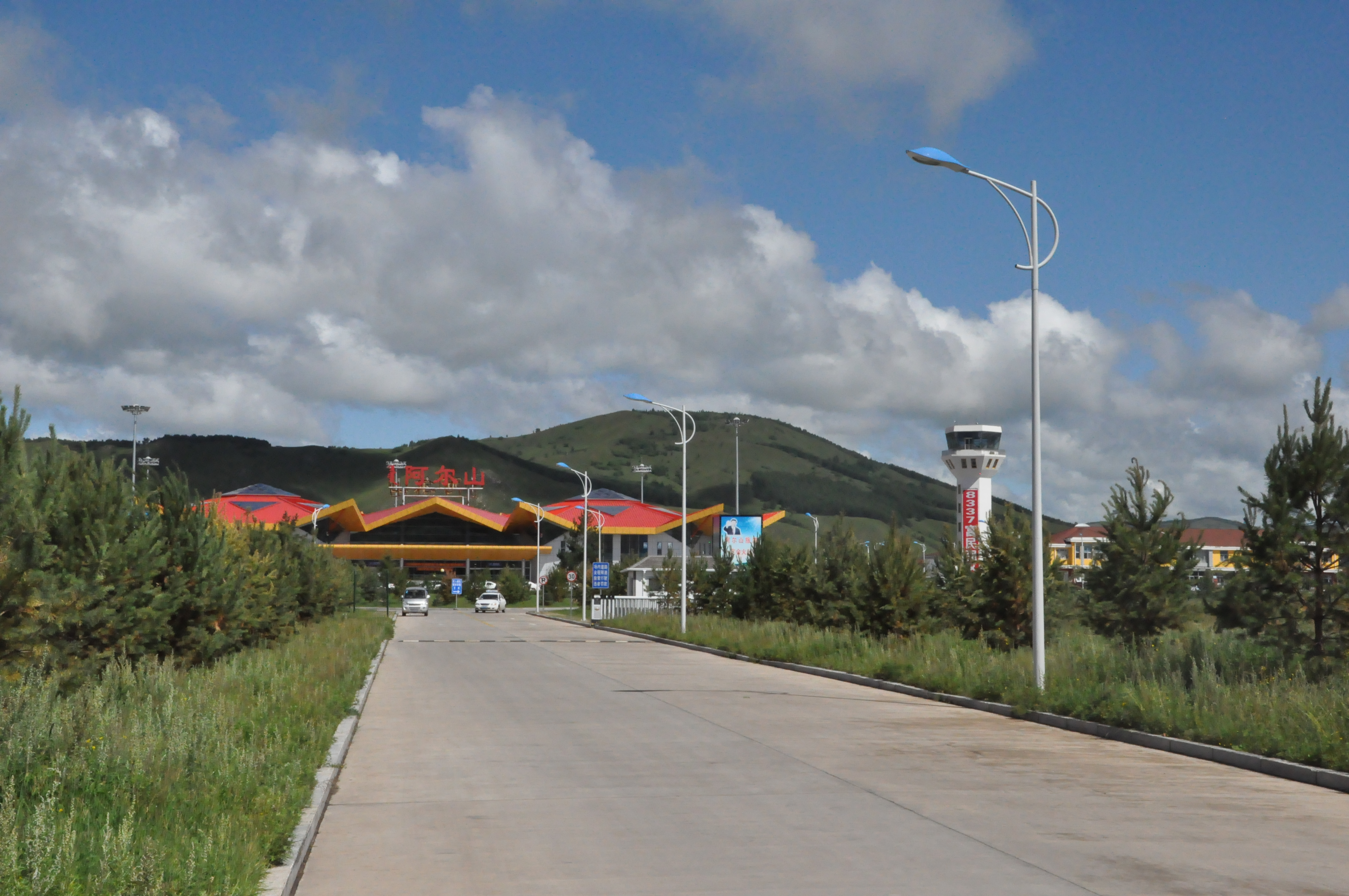
- IATA: YIE; ICAO: ZBES

Summary
- Airport type: Public
- Serves: Arxan, Inner Mongolia, China
- Location: Yi'ershi
- Opened: 28 August 2011
- Coordinates: 47°18′38″N 119°54′43″E

Map
- Location of airport in Inner Mongolia

Runways
Direction	Length		Surface
Direction	m	ft	Surface
08/26	2,400	7,874

Statistics (2021)
- Passengers: 52,860
- Aircraft movements: 1,242
- Cargo (metric tons): 31.3

Arxan Yiershi Airport
- Simplified Chinese: 阿尔山伊尔施机场
- Traditional Chinese: 阿爾山伊爾施機場
Transcriptions
Standard Mandarin
- Hanyu Pinyin: Ā'ěrshān Yī'ěrshī Jīchǎng

Aershan Yiershi Airport (IATA: YIE, ICAO: ZBES) is an airport serving the city of Arxan (A'ershan) in the Hinggan League of Inner Mongolia Autonomous Region, China. It is located near the town of Yi'ershi, 16.5 kilometers north of the city center. Construction started in September 2008 with a total investment of 303 million yuan, and the airport was opened on 28 August 2011.

== Facilities ==
The airport has one runway that is 2,400 meters long and 45 meters wide, and is designed to handle 290,000 passengers per year.

== Airlines and destinations ==
Airlines	Destinations
Beijing Capital Airlines	Beijing–Daxing
China Express Airlines	Hohhot, Ulanhot

== See also ==
- List of airports in China
- List of the busiest airports in China
