= Aiguo =

Aiguo (simplified Chinese: 爱国; traditional Chinese: 愛國; pinyin: Àiguó; lit. 'love country') may refer to these places in China:

- Aiguo Subdistrict, Zhanjiang, in Xiashan District, Zhanjiang, Guangdong
- Aiguo Subdistrict, Ulanhot, Inner Mongolia
