= Tianchi =

Tianchi (天池) may refer to several locations in China:

== Lakes ==
Heaven Lake primarily refers to the crater lake of Mount Baekdu, on the Sino–North Korean border

Heaven Lake is the translation of a Chinese, Mongolian, Manju, Korean, etc. name of a lake; here "Heaven" may refer to Tian or Tengri here:

- Heaven Lake of Tian Shan, lake in Xinjiang
- Heaven Lake of Arxan, near Arxan City, Inner Mongolia

== Places ==
- Tianchi, Mianchi County, in Mianchi County, Henan
- Tianchi, Arxan, in Arxan City, Inner Mongolia
- Tianchi, Huaying, in Huaying City, Sichuan
- Tianchi, Lezhi County, in Lezhi County, Sichuan
- Tianchi, Xuyong County, in Xuyong County, Sichuan
- Tianchi Lake, Phoenix Mountains, Wudong Village, Guangdong Province
