= Aiguo Subdistrict, Ulanhot =

Aiguo Subdistrict 爱国街道
- Subdistrict
- Location in Inner Mongolia
- Coordinates: 46°4′44″N 122°4′29″E
- Country: China
- Autonomous region: Inner Mongolia
- League: Hinggan League
- County-level city: Ulanhot
- Time zone: UTC+8 (China Standard Time)

Aiguo Subdistrict (Chinese: 爱国街道; pinyin: Àiguó Jiēdào) is a subdistrict in Ulanhot, Inner Mongolia, China. As of 2020, it administers the following four residential neighborhoods:

- Wanjia Community (万佳社区)
- Chunyang Community (春阳社区)
- Puhui Community (普惠社区)
- Tao'erhe Community (洮儿河社区)

== See also ==
- List of township-level divisions of Inner Mongolia
