= Cao Zhenghai =

Chinese politician (1960–2017)

- 曹征海

Vice Chairman of the Chinese People's Political Consultative Conference Anhui Provincial Committee
- In office January 2017 – May 2017

Personal details
- Born: March 1960 Datong, Shanxi, China
- Died: 20 May 2017 (aged 57) Beijing, China
- Education: Renmin University of China; Minzu University of China
- Occupation: Politician

Cao Zhenghai (March 1960 - May 20, 2017, Chinese: 曹征海), a native of Datong, Shanxi, was a political figure in the People's Republic of China. He obtained his degree from the Department of Industrial Economics at Renmin University of China, specializing in capital building economics, and earned a PhD degree from the Central University for Nationalities, focusing on the economics of China's ethnic minorities.

== Biography ==
In September 1978, he enrolled in the Department of Industrial Economics at Renmin University of China, specializing on capital building economics. In September 1982, he entered the workforce and was appointed to instruct in the company management department at Inner Mongolia Architecture School. In September 1983, he assumed the role of an officer in the Comprehensive Planning Department of the Inner Mongolia Autonomous Region Capital Construction Committee. In September 1984, he was designated as an officer in the Strategy Department of the Political Research Office of the Inner Mongolia Autonomous Regional Committee of the Chinese Communist Party and concurrently served as an associate researcher. In March 1988, he joined the Chinese Communist Party (CCP). In September 1989, he became the deputy director of the Strategy Division of the Political Research Office of the Party Committee of the Inner Mongolia Autonomous Region. In July 1992, he was promoted to director of the same division and concurrently appointed deputy secretary of the CCP Linhe Municipal Party Committee. In February 1998, he was appointed deputy mayor of Baotou City, and in September 2001, he became vice mayor of the Baotou Municipal. In September 2001, he was appointed as a member of the Standing Committee of the Baotou Municipal Committee of the CCP and served as Deputy Mayor of Baotou. In March 2003, he assumed the position of Deputy Secretary of the CCP Baotou Municipal Committee. In January 2005, he assumed the role of Deputy Secretary of the CCP Hulunbuir Municipal Committee and acting mayor of Hulunbuir, subsequently being elected as Mayor of Hulunbuir in March 2005. In October 2006, he assumed the position of Secretary of the CCP Hulunbuir Municipal Committee. In December 2010, he was appointed to the Standing Committee of the Inner Mongolia Autonomous Regional Committee of the CCP.

In May 2012, he was appointed as a member of the Standing Committee of the Anhui Provincial Committee of the CCP and served as the minister of the publicity department. In January 2017, he assumed the role of deputy secretary of the Party Group and vice-chairman of the Anhui Provincial Committee of the Chinese People's Political Consultative Conference (CPPCC).

He died in Beijing on May 20, 2017, following a protracted illness during his tenure.

Party political offices
Previous: Tang Chengpei	Minister of the Publicity Department, CCP Anhui Provincial Committee	Next: Yu Aihua
Previous: Liang Tiecheng	Secretary of the CCP Hulunbuir Municipal Committee	Next: Luo Zhihu
Government offices
Previous: Liang Tiecheng	Mayor of Hulunbuir	Next: Luo Zhihu
