= Arxan National Forest Park =

Park in Mongolia, China

- Location: Inner Mongolia
- Nearest city: Arxan

Arxan National Forest Park is a national park in Arxan, Inner Mongolia, China. The park was established in 2000 and rated in 2017 as a AAAAA tourist destination. The park lies in the southwest foothill of the volcanic mountain range of the Greater Khingan. The park is known for landscape of solidified lava formations, crater lakes and dense forests.

During a 2014 tour, CCP general secretary Xi Jinping remarked that Arxan is "beautiful in all four seasons" and "will rise to fame by developing tourism".

A Rhododendron Festival is staged in May during the flower season to celebrate the blossom of the Rhododendron.
