= Ulanhot =

City in Inner Mongolia, China

Ulanhot 乌兰浩特市 ᠤᠯᠠᠭᠠᠨᠬᠣᠲᠠ
- County-level city
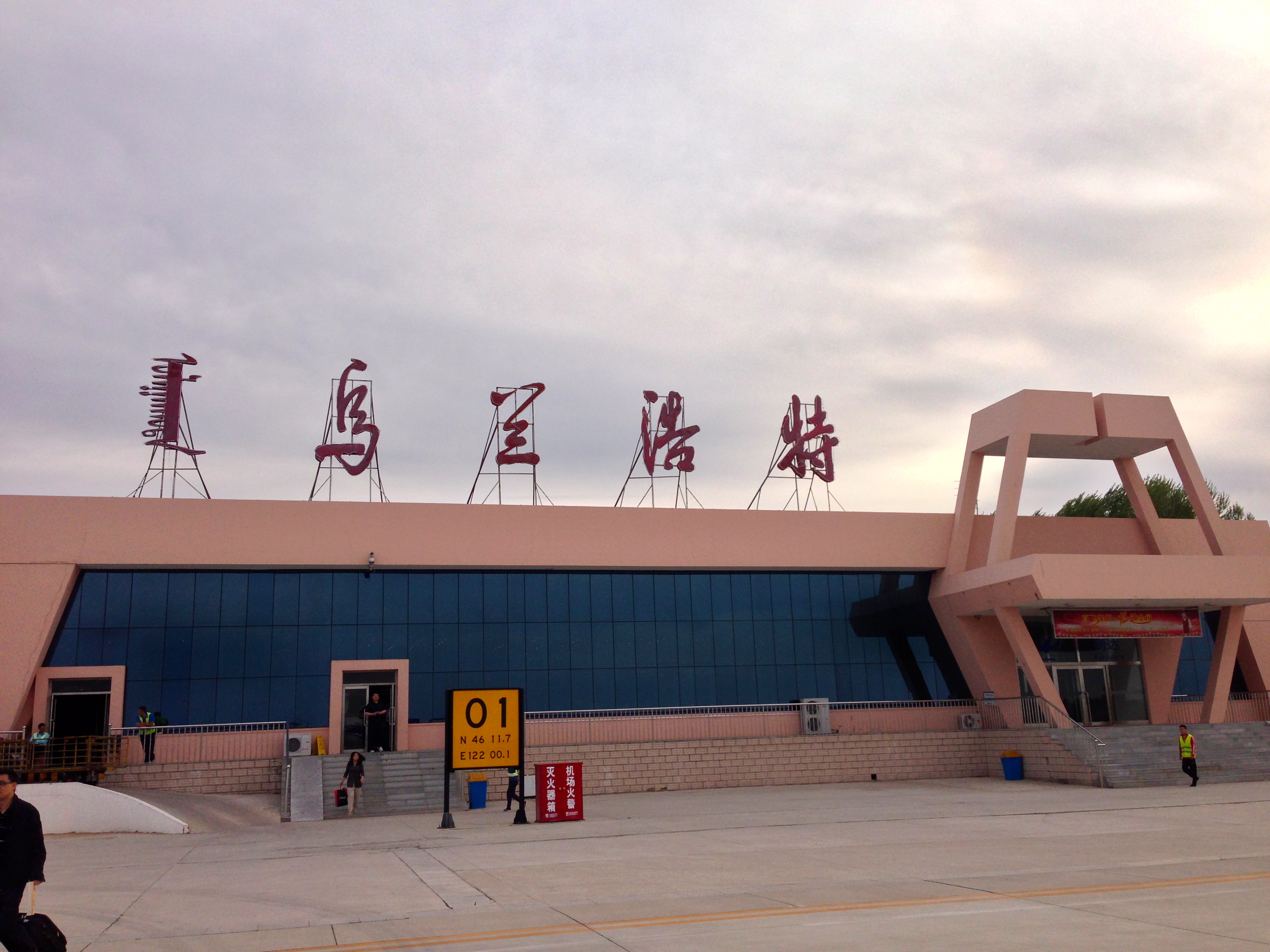
- Ulanhot Airport main terminal building

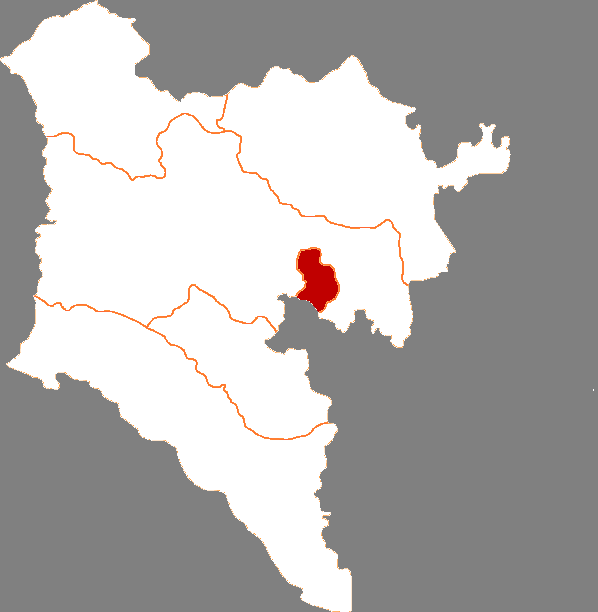
- Ulanhot in Hinggan

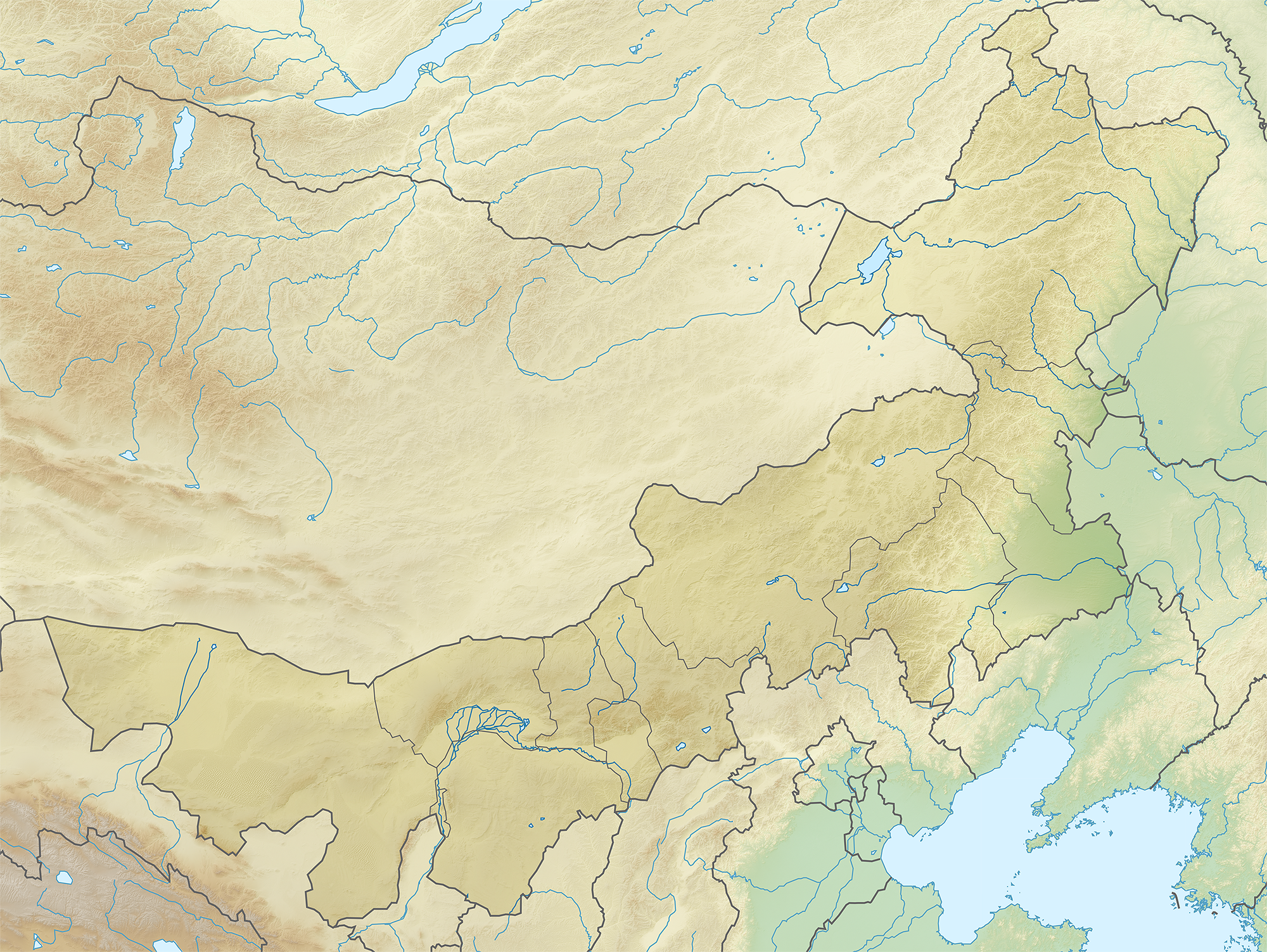
- Location of the city center in Inner Mongolia Ulanhot (China)
- Coordinates (Ulanhot municipal government): 46°04′20″N 122°05′36″E
- Country: China
- Autonomous region: Inner Mongolia
- League: Hinggan
- Municipal seat: Heping Subdistrict

Area
  - County-level city: 772.0 km^{2} (298.1 sq mi)
  - Urban: 86.10 km^{2} (33.24 sq mi)

Population (2020)
  - County-level city: 356,035
  - Density: 461.2/km^{2} (1,194/sq mi)
  - Urban: 265,600
  - Urban density: 3,085/km^{2} (7,990/sq mi)
- Time zone: UTC+8 (China Standard)
- Postal code: 137400
- Area code: 0482
- Website: www.wlht.gov.cn

Ulanhot

Chinese name
- Simplified Chinese: 乌兰浩特
- Traditional Chinese: 烏蘭浩特
Transcriptions
Standard Mandarin
- Hanyu Pinyin: Wūlánhàotè

Mongolian name
- Mongolian Cyrillic: Улаан хот
- Mongolian script: ᠤᠯᠠᠭᠠᠨᠬᠣᠲᠠ
Transcriptions
- SASM/GNC: Ulaγan qota

Former name

Alternative Chinese name
- Traditional Chinese: 王爺廟
- Simplified Chinese: 王爷庙
- Literal meaning: prince temple
Transcriptions
Standard Mandarin
- Hanyu Pinyin: Wángyemiào

Mongolian name
- Mongolian Cyrillic: Вангийн сүм
- Mongolian script: ᠸᠠᠩ ᠤᠨ ᠰᠦᠮ᠎ᠡ
Transcriptions
- SASM/GNC: Wang-un süme

Ulanhot (Note: Mongolian: ᠤᠯᠠᠭᠠᠨᠬᠣᠲᠠ, romanized: Ulaγanqota, pronounced [ʊlɑ́ːŋxɔtʰ(ə)]; lit. 'Red City'; simplified Chinese: 乌兰浩特; traditional Chinese: 烏蘭浩特; pinyin: Wūlánhàotè) is a county-level city and the administrative center of Hinggan League in the east of Inner Mongolia, China. Formerly known as Wangin Süm, (Note: Mongolian: ᠸᠠᠩ ᠤᠨ ᠰᠦᠮ᠎ᠡ᠎, romanized: Wang-un sume, pronounced [wɑŋkʲíːn súm(ə)]; simplified Chinese: 王爷庙; traditional Chinese: 王爺廟; pinyin: Wángyé miào; lit. 'Temple of the King') the city became the first capital of Inner Mongolia, the first autonomous region in China, on 1 May 1947, until the regional capital moved to Zhangjiakou in late December 1949; the regional capital moved again in June 1952 to Hohhot, which remains the capital to this day.

The city is connected to Baicheng, Jilin by the Baicheng–Arxan railway (Chinese: 白阿铁路), which runs through the pass south of Ulanhot. China's National Highway 302 runs from Tumen, Jilin to Ulanhot. In the 7918 Network of Highways it will be on the route from Hunchun to Ulanhot. The city is also served by Ulanhot Yilelite Airport (ICAO code ZBUL, IATA code HLH). Routes flown by Air China and Hainan Airlines connect Ulanhot with Beijing Capital International Airport and Hohhot.

Just outside the city is a tomb from the Yuan dynasty and a temple dedicated to Genghis Khan. The temple was constructed in 1940. In the year 2002 it received funds for significant expansion.

== Administrative divisions ==
Ulanhot is divided into 10 subdistricts and 4 towns.

Name	Simplified Chinese	Hanyu Pinyin	Mongolian (Hudum Script)	Mongolian (Cyrillic)	Administrative division code
Subdistricts
Aiguo Subdistrict	爱国街道	Àiguó Jiēdào	ᠠᠢ ᠭᠦᠸᠧ ᠵᠡᠭᠡᠯᠢ ᠭᠤᠳᠤᠮᠵᠢ	Ай хве зээл гудамж	152201001
Heping Subdistrict	和平街道	Hépíng Jiēdào	ᠾᠧ ᠫᠢᠩ ᠵᠡᠭᠡᠯᠢ ᠭᠤᠳᠤᠮᠵᠢ	Ге пин зээл гудамж	152201002
Xing'an Subdistrict	兴安街道	Xīng'ān Jiēdào	ᠬᠢᠩᠭᠠᠨ ᠵᠡᠭᠡᠯᠢ ᠭᠤᠳᠤᠮᠵᠢ	Хянган зээл гудамж	152201003
Shengli Subdistrict	胜利街道	Shènglì Jiēdào	ᠱᠧᠩᠯᠢ ᠵᠡᠭᠡᠯᠢ ᠭᠤᠳᠤᠮᠵᠢ	Шенли зээл гудамж	152201004
Tiexi Subdistrict	铁西街道	Tiěxī Jiēdào	ᠲᠡᠮᠦᠷ ᠵᠠᠮ ᠤᠨ ᠪᠠᠷᠠᠭᠤᠨᠳ᠋ᠠᠬᠢ ᠵᠡᠭᠡᠯᠢ ᠭᠤᠳᠤᠮᠵᠢ	Дамар замын баруунтах зээл гудамж	152201005
Dulin Subdistrict	都林街道	Dūlín Jiēdào	ᠳᠡᠭᠦᠯᠢᠨ ᠵᠡᠭᠡᠯᠢ ᠭᠤᠳᠤᠮᠵᠢ	Дүүлэн зээл гудамж	152201006
Wuyi Subdistrict	五一街道	Wǔyī Jiēdào	ᠡᠦ ᠢ ᠵᠡᠭᠡᠯᠢ ᠭᠤᠳᠤᠮᠵᠢ	Үү И зээл гудамж	152201007
Chengjiao Subdistrict	城郊街道	Chéngjiāo Jiēdào	ᠬᠣᠲᠠ ᠶᠢᠨ ᠲᠡᠭᠦᠷᠭᠡᠨ ᠵᠡᠭᠡᠯᠢ ᠭᠤᠳᠤᠮᠵᠢ	Хотын дүүргэн зээл гудамж	152201008
Xincheng Subdistrict	新城街道	Xīnchéng Jiēdào	ᠰᠢᠨ᠎ᠡ ᠬᠣᠲᠠ ᠵᠡᠭᠡᠯᠢ ᠭᠤᠳᠢᠮᠵᠢ	Шинэ хот зээл гудимж	152201009
Tianjiao Subdistrict	天骄街道	Tiānjiāo Jiēdào	ᠲᠢᠶᠠᠨ ᠵᠢᠶᠣᠤ ᠵᠡᠭᠡᠯᠢ ᠭᠤᠳᠤᠮᠵᠢ	Даяан жяо зээл гудамж	152201010
Towns
Ulan Had Town	乌兰哈达镇	Wūlánhādá Zhèn	ᠤᠯᠠᠭᠠᠨᠬᠠᠳᠠ ᠪᠠᠯᠭᠠᠰᠤ	Улаанахта балгас	152201100
Gegensüm Town	葛根庙镇	Gěgēnmiào Zhèn	ᠭᠡᠭᠡᠨᠰᠦ᠋ᠮ᠎ᠡ ᠪᠠᠯᠭᠠᠰᠤ	Хээнсм балгас	152201101
Tabin Ortoo Town	太本站镇	Tàiběnzhàn Zhèn	ᠲᠠᠪᠢᠨ ᠥᠷᠲᠡᠭᠡ ᠪᠠᠯᠭᠠᠰᠤ	Тавин өртөө балгас	152201102
Ilalt Town	义勒力特镇	Yìlèlìtè Zhèn	ᠢᠯᠠᠯᠲᠠ ᠪᠠᠯᠭᠠᠰᠤ	Ялалт балгас	152201103

Others:

- Hoh Horse Herding Pasture (呼和马场)
- Ulanhot Green Industrial Park (乌兰浩特绿色产业园)
- Hinggan League Economic-Technological Development Area (兴安盟经济技术开发区)

== Climate ==
Ulan Hot has a monsoon-influenced humid continental climate (Köppen Dwa, Trewartha Dcac). Winters are long, cold and dry, while summers are very warm. The monthly 24-hour mean temperature ranges from −15.0 °C (5.0 °F) in January to 22.9 °C (73.2 °F) in July, and the annual mean is 5.03 °C (41.1 °F). Over two-thirds of the annual rainfall occurs from May to August.

Ulan Hot

Climate chart (precipitation, max. and min. temperature)
J	F	M	A	M	J	J	A	S	O	N	D
1.5 −8 −19	2 −3 −15	4.2 5 −8	17 15 2	41 23 10	88 27 16	135 29 19	82 28 17	39 22 10	13 13 1	4.1 1 −9	3.6 −7 −17
- █ Average max. and min. temperatures in °C
- █ Precipitation totals in mm
- Source: CMA
Imperial conversion
J	F	M	A	M	J	J	A	S	O	N	D
0.1 17 −1	0.1 27 5	0.2 41 19	0.7 59 35	1.6 73 49	3.4 81 60	5.3 84 66	3.2 82 62	1.5 72 49	0.5 56 34	0.2 34 16	0.1 19 2
- █ Average max. and min. temperatures in °F
- █ Precipitation totals in inches

Climate data for Ulan Hot, elevation 275 m (902 ft), (1991–2020 normals, extremes 1971–2000)
Month	Jan	Feb	Mar	Apr	May	Jun	Jul	Aug	Sep	Oct	Nov	Dec	Year
Record high °C (°F)	6.0 (42.8)	11.7 (53.1)	23.5 (74.3)	31.7 (89.1)	38.3 (100.9)	40.3 (104.5)	39.7 (103.5)	37.1 (98.8)	32.5 (90.5)	29.9 (85.8)	18.9 (66.0)	7.7 (45.9)	40.3 (104.5)
Mean daily maximum °C (°F)	−8.1 (17.4)	−2.8 (27.0)	5.1 (41.2)	15.0 (59.0)	22.7 (72.9)	27.3 (81.1)	29.1 (84.4)	27.5 (81.5)	22.3 (72.1)	13.3 (55.9)	1.1 (34.0)	−7.1 (19.2)	12.1 (53.8)
Daily mean °C (°F)	−14.1 (6.6)	−9.5 (14.9)	−1.6 (29.1)	8.3 (46.9)	16.2 (61.2)	21.5 (70.7)	23.9 (75.0)	22.0 (71.6)	15.7 (60.3)	6.7 (44.1)	−4.5 (23.9)	−12.5 (9.5)	6.0 (42.8)
Mean daily minimum °C (°F)	−18.6 (−1.5)	−14.9 (5.2)	−7.5 (18.5)	1.6 (34.9)	9.5 (49.1)	15.7 (60.3)	19.0 (66.2)	16.8 (62.2)	9.6 (49.3)	1.1 (34.0)	−9.0 (15.8)	−16.7 (1.9)	0.6 (33.0)
Record low °C (°F)	−33.7 (−28.7)	−31.2 (−24.2)	−25.4 (−13.7)	−13.6 (7.5)	−4.5 (23.9)	2.9 (37.2)	10.4 (50.7)	6.0 (42.8)	−3.5 (25.7)	−17.4 (0.7)	−26.4 (−15.5)	−32.9 (−27.2)	−33.7 (−28.7)
Average precipitation mm (inches)	1.5 (0.06)	2.0 (0.08)	4.2 (0.17)	17.1 (0.67)	40.9 (1.61)	87.5 (3.44)	134.8 (5.31)	81.8 (3.22)	38.8 (1.53)	13.4 (0.53)	4.1 (0.16)	3.6 (0.14)	429.7 (16.92)
Average precipitation days (≥ 0.1 mm)	2.4	1.8	3.0	3.9	7.6	11.9	12.7	10.8	7.1	3.5	3.2	3.4	71.3
Average snowy days	4.2	3.0	4.6	1.7	0.1	0	0	0	0.1	1.1	4.4	5.3	24.5
Average relative humidity (%)	52	43	37	34	40	55	66	66	56	48	50	54	50
Mean monthly sunshine hours	202.5	216.2	266.2	261.4	271.5	252.0	244.0	255.8	249.9	230.0	184.0	177.3	2,810.8
Percentage possible sunshine	72	73	71	64	58	54	52	59	67	69	66	66	64
Source 1: China Meteorological Administration
Source 2: Weather China

== Education ==
Secondary schools in Ulanhot include:

- Ulanhot No. 1 (乌兰浩特第一中学)
- Ulanhot No. 2 (乌兰浩特第二中学)
- Ulanhot No. 3 (乌兰浩特第三中学)

== Transportation ==
- Ulanhot Yilelite Airport
- Ulanhot railway station
