= Horqin Right Middle Banner =

Horqin Right Middle Banner 科尔沁右翼中旗 • ᠬᠣᠷᠴᠢᠨ ᠪᠠᠷᠠᠭᠤᠨ ᠭᠠᠷᠤᠨ ᠳᠤᠮᠳᠠᠳᠤ ᠬᠣᠰᠢᠭᠤ
- Banner
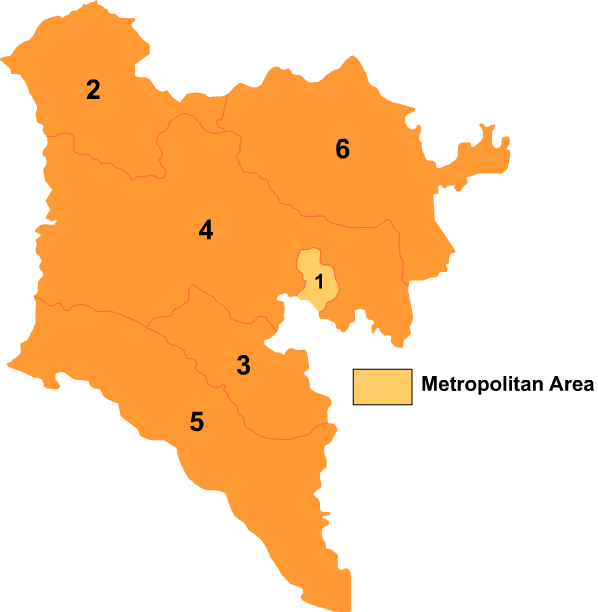
- Hinggan divisions: Horqin Right Middle Banner is 5 on this map

- Location of the seat in Inner Mongolia Horqin RMB (China)
- Coordinates (Horqin Right Middle Banner government): 45.061°N 121.477°E
- Country: China
- Autonomous region: Inner Mongolia
- League: Hinggan
- Banner seat: Bayan Huxu

Area
  - Total: 15,613 km^{2} (6,028 sq mi)

Population (2020)
  - Total: 207,380
  - Density: 13.283/km^{2} (34.402/sq mi)
- Time zone: UTC+8 (China Standard)
- Postal code: 029400
- Division code: HYZ
- Website: www.kyzq.gov.cn

Horqin Right Middle Banner

Chinese name
- Simplified Chinese: 科尔沁右翼中旗
- Traditional Chinese: 科爾沁右翼中旗
Transcriptions
Standard Mandarin
- Hanyu Pinyin: kē'ěrqìn Yòuyì Zhōng Qí

Mongolian name
- Mongolian Cyrillic: Хорчин Баруун Гарын Дундад Хошуу
- Mongolian script: ᠬᠣᠷᠴᠢᠨ ᠪᠠᠷᠠᠭᠤᠨ ᠭᠠᠷᠤᠨ ᠳᠤᠮᠳᠠᠳᠤ ᠬᠣᠰᠢᠭᠤ
Transcriptions
- SASM/GNC: Qorčin Baraɣun Ɣarun Dumdadu qosiɣu

Horqin Right Middle Banner (Mongolian script: ᠬᠣᠷᠴᠢᠨ ᠪᠠᠷᠠᠭᠤᠨ ᠭᠠᠷᠤᠨ ᠳᠤᠮᠳᠠᠳᠤ ᠬᠣᠰᠢᠭᠤ; Chinese: 科尔沁右翼中旗) is a banner in the east of Inner Mongolia, China, bordering Jilin province to the east. It is under the administration of Hinggan League. The local Mongolian dialect is Khorchin Mongolian. The banner spans an area of 15,613 square kilometers in area, and has a population of 207,380 as of 2020.

== Name ==
"Horqin" in Mongolian translates to "archer". The area was also historically known as the Tüsheet Banner (ᠲᠦᠰᠢᠶᠡᠲᠦ ᠬᠣᠰᠢᠭᠤ, Chinese: 图什业图旗).

== Geography ==
It borders Horqin Right Front Banner and Tuquan County to the north, Tongyu County and Taonan in Jilin Province to the east, Horqin Left Middle Banner to the south, and Jarud Banner, Huolinguole and East Ujimqin Banner to the west.

The banner's main rivers include the Holin Gol, the Obor Hund Gol, the Emtin Gol (额木庭郭勒), and the Wunugeqi Gol (乌努格其河).

=== Climate ===
The average annual temperature is 5.6 °C (42.1 °F), and the annual precipitation is typically between 350 and 400 millimetres (14 and 16 in).

Climate data for Horqin Right Middle Banner, elevation 282 m (925 ft), (1991–2020 normals, extremes 1981–2010)
| Month | Jan | Feb | Mar | Apr | May | Jun | Jul | Aug | Sep | Oct | Nov | Dec | Year |
|---|---|---|---|---|---|---|---|---|---|---|---|---|---|
| Record high °C (°F) | 8.5 (47.3) | 14.4 (57.9) | 29.2 (84.6) | 33.7 (92.7) | 40.0 (104.0) | 42.1 (107.8) | 39.9 (103.8) | 39.9 (103.8) | 35.3 (95.5) | 29.7 (85.5) | 19.4 (66.9) | 11.4 (52.5) | 42.1 (107.8) |
| Mean daily maximum °C (°F) | −7.4 (18.7) | −2.2 (28.0) | 5.8 (42.4) | 15.8 (60.4) | 23.5 (74.3) | 27.9 (82.2) | 29.6 (85.3) | 28.3 (82.9) | 23.2 (73.8) | 14.2 (57.6) | 2.1 (35.8) | −6.1 (21.0) | 12.9 (55.2) |
| Daily mean °C (°F) | −12.6 (9.3) | −8.3 (17.1) | −0.6 (30.9) | 9.2 (48.6) | 16.9 (62.4) | 22.0 (71.6) | 24.4 (75.9) | 22.6 (72.7) | 16.6 (61.9) | 7.8 (46.0) | −3.2 (26.2) | −10.9 (12.4) | 7.0 (44.6) |
| Mean daily minimum °C (°F) | −16.5 (2.3) | −13.0 (8.6) | −6.2 (20.8) | 3.0 (37.4) | 10.6 (51.1) | 16.5 (61.7) | 19.6 (67.3) | 17.6 (63.7) | 10.9 (51.6) | 2.5 (36.5) | −7.6 (18.3) | −14.8 (5.4) | 1.9 (35.4) |
| Record low °C (°F) | −29.4 (−20.9) | −27.5 (−17.5) | −19.5 (−3.1) | −9.2 (15.4) | −0.5 (31.1) | 4.5 (40.1) | 11.7 (53.1) | 8.9 (48.0) | 0.8 (33.4) | −12.6 (9.3) | −21.6 (−6.9) | −26.6 (−15.9) | −29.4 (−20.9) |
| Average precipitation mm (inches) | 1.1 (0.04) | 1.8 (0.07) | 4.8 (0.19) | 12.6 (0.50) | 38.2 (1.50) | 75.1 (2.96) | 111.7 (4.40) | 79.4 (3.13) | 29.2 (1.15) | 13.4 (0.53) | 3.8 (0.15) | 3.2 (0.13) | 374.3 (14.75) |
| Average precipitation days (≥ 0.1 mm) | 1.9 | 1.5 | 3.2 | 4.0 | 7.4 | 11.3 | 12.2 | 10.2 | 7.0 | 4.1 | 2.3 | 2.8 | 67.9 |
| Average snowy days | 3.1 | 2.2 | 3.8 | 1.6 | 0.1 | 0 | 0 | 0 | 0 | 1.0 | 3.3 | 4.5 | 19.6 |
| Average relative humidity (%) | 46 | 40 | 36 | 33 | 39 | 54 | 66 | 65 | 54 | 45 | 46 | 49 | 48 |
| Mean monthly sunshine hours | 213.2 | 229.9 | 277.3 | 275.9 | 292.0 | 271.2 | 264.9 | 274.4 | 262.1 | 244.2 | 193.7 | 186.8 | 2,985.6 |
| Percentage possible sunshine | 75 | 78 | 74 | 68 | 63 | 58 | 57 | 64 | 71 | 73 | 69 | 69 | 68 |
Source: China Meteorological Administration

Climate data for Gaoliban Town, Horqin Right Middle Banner (1991–2020 normals)
| Month | Jan | Feb | Mar | Apr | May | Jun | Jul | Aug | Sep | Oct | Nov | Dec | Year |
|---|---|---|---|---|---|---|---|---|---|---|---|---|---|
| Mean daily maximum °C (°F) | −7.3 (18.9) | −2.0 (28.4) | 6.2 (43.2) | 16.1 (61.0) | 23.7 (74.7) | 28.2 (82.8) | 29.8 (85.6) | 28.4 (83.1) | 23.4 (74.1) | 14.4 (57.9) | 2.3 (36.1) | −6.1 (21.0) | 13.1 (55.6) |
| Daily mean °C (°F) | −13.8 (7.2) | −9.1 (15.6) | −1.1 (30.0) | 8.8 (47.8) | 16.7 (62.1) | 21.9 (71.4) | 24.2 (75.6) | 22.2 (72.0) | 16.0 (60.8) | 7.2 (45.0) | −4.2 (24.4) | −12.1 (10.2) | 6.4 (43.5) |
| Mean daily minimum °C (°F) | −18.9 (−2.0) | −15.1 (4.8) | −8.1 (17.4) | 1.2 (34.2) | 9.3 (48.7) | 15.5 (59.9) | 18.9 (66.0) | 16.6 (61.9) | 9.2 (48.6) | 0.7 (33.3) | −9.7 (14.5) | −17.1 (1.2) | 0.2 (32.4) |
| Average precipitation mm (inches) | 0.9 (0.04) | 1.9 (0.07) | 3.6 (0.14) | 11.7 (0.46) | 35.4 (1.39) | 63.1 (2.48) | 89.4 (3.52) | 67.8 (2.67) | 32.4 (1.28) | 11.1 (0.44) | 3.0 (0.12) | 2.6 (0.10) | 322.9 (12.71) |
| Average precipitation days (≥ 0.1 mm) | 1.9 | 1.5 | 2.5 | 3.8 | 7.3 | 11.2 | 11.7 | 9.2 | 6.7 | 3.7 | 2.4 | 2.6 | 64.5 |
| Average snowy days | 2.8 | 2.0 | 3.2 | 1.2 | 0.1 | 0 | 0 | 0 | 0.2 | 0.9 | 2.9 | 3.6 | 16.9 |
| Average relative humidity (%) | 51 | 43 | 38 | 36 | 43 | 58 | 70 | 72 | 62 | 51 | 52 | 54 | 53 |
| Mean monthly sunshine hours | 204.5 | 220.1 | 264.5 | 261.5 | 275.7 | 260.4 | 251.1 | 252.5 | 243.3 | 224.3 | 188.5 | 183.2 | 2,829.6 |
| Percentage possible sunshine | 71 | 74 | 71 | 64 | 60 | 56 | 54 | 59 | 66 | 67 | 67 | 67 | 65 |
Source: China Meteorological Administration

== History ==
A segment of the Jin Dynasty Great Wall runs through the banner. The Jin Dynasty city of Tule Mod (吐列毛) was located in the banner, and its ruins of the city still exist within the banner.

Horqin Right Middle Banner was established in 1636.

== Administrative divisions ==
The banner is divided into 6 towns and 6 sums. The banner's seat of government is the town of Bayan Huxu.

| Name | Simplified Chinese | Hanyu Pinyin | Mongolian (Hudum Script) | Mongolian (Cyrillic) | Administrative division code |
|---|---|---|---|---|---|
Towns
| Bayan Huxu | 巴彦呼舒镇 | Bāyànhūshū Zhèn | ᠪᠠᠶᠠᠨᠬᠣᠰᠢᠭᠤ ᠪᠠᠯᠭᠠᠰᠤ | Баянхошуу балгас | 152222100 |
| Barun Jirem | 巴仁哲里木镇 | Bārénzhélǐmù Zhèn | ᠪᠠᠷᠠᠭᠤᠨ ᠵᠢᠷᠢᠮ ᠪᠠᠯᠭᠠᠰᠤ | Баруун жирим балгас | 152222101 |
| Tule Mod | 吐列毛杜镇 | Tǔlièmáodù Zhèn | ᠲᠦᠯᠢᠶᠡᠮᠣᠳᠣ ᠪᠠᠯᠭᠠᠰᠤ | Дөлгөөмт балгас | 152222102 |
| Durelj | 杜尔基镇 | Dù'ěrjī Zhèn | ᠳᠦᠷᠦᠯᠵᠢ ᠪᠠᠯᠭᠠᠰᠤ | Дөрөлж балгас | 152222103 |
| Golin Baixing | 高力板镇 | Gāolìbǎn Zhèn | ᠭᠣᠣᠯ ᠤᠨ ᠪᠠᠢᠰᠢᠩ ᠪᠠᠯᠭᠠᠰᠤ | Голын байшин балгас | 152222104 |
| Hoyor Sum | 好腰苏木镇 | Hǎoyāosūmù Zhèn | ᠬᠣᠶᠠᠷ ᠰᠤᠮᠤ ᠪᠠᠯᠭᠠᠰᠤ | Хоёр сум балгас | 152222105 |
Sums
| Daiqin Tal Sum | 代钦塔拉苏木 | Dàiqīntǎlā Sūmù | ᠳᠠᠢᠴᠢᠨᠲᠠᠯ᠎ᠠ ᠰᠤᠮᠤ | Дайчинэтэл сум | 152222200 |
| Xinjam Sum | 新佳木苏木 | Xīnjiāmù Sūmù | ᠰᠢᠨᠡᠵᠠᠮ ᠰᠤᠮᠤ | Шинэзэм сум | 152222201 |
| Har Nur Sum | 哈日诺尔苏木 | Hārìnuò'ěr Sūmù | ᠬᠠᠷᠠᠨᠠᠭᠤᠷ ᠰᠤᠮᠤ | Харнуур сум | 152222202 |
| Emtin Gol Sum | 额木庭高勒苏木 | Émùtínggāolè Sūmù | ᠡᠮᠲᠦ ᠶᠢᠨ ᠭᠣᠣᠯ ᠰᠤᠮᠤ | Эмтийн гол сум | 152222203 |
| Bayan Mangh Sum | 巴彦茫哈苏木 | Bāyànmánghā Sūmù | ᠪᠠᠶᠠᠨᠮᠠᠩᠬ᠎ᠠ ᠰᠤᠮᠤ | Баянманх сум | 152222204 |
| Bayan Nur Sum | 巴彦淖尔苏木 | Bāyànnào'ěr Sūmù | ᠪᠠᠶᠠᠨᠨᠠᠭᠤᠷ ᠰᠤᠮᠤ | Баяннуур сум | 152222205 |

Others:

- Budun Hua Ranch (布敦化牧场)
- Tule Mod Farm (吐列毛杜农场)
- Monggon Tolgoi Mine Work Unit (孟恩套力盖矿区工作部)
- Budun Hua Mine Work Unit (布敦化矿区工作部)

== Demographics ==
The banner has a population of 255,494 people, hailing from 14 different ethnic groups. The ethnic Mongolian population is dominant in the banner, accounting for 86.6% of the total population, the highest proportion of any banner.

== Economy ==
As of 2016, the banner's GDP totaled 6.596 billion Yuan, government revenue totaled 232 million Yuan, urban per capita disposable income reached 21,700 Yuan, and rural per capita disposable income reached 7,904 Yuan.

The banner's main mineral deposits include gold, tin, copper, iron, lead, zinc, coal, rare earth minerals, perlite, and quartz.

== Transportation ==
The Tongliao-Holin Gol railway passes through the banner, as does National Highway 110.
