= Hohhot No. 4 Prison =

Prison in Southern Mongolia, China

- Location within Southern Mongolia Hohhot No. 4 Prison (China)
- Location: 40.864306°N 111.589267°E
- Status: Operational
- Managed by: Inner Mongolia Prison Administrative Bureau

Hohhot No. 4 Prison
- Simplified Chinese: 呼和浩特第四监狱
- Traditional Chinese: 呼和浩特第四監獄
Transcriptions

Hohhot No. 4 Prison (Chinese: 呼和浩特第四监狱)i s located in Ba Kouzi Village, Youyouban Town, Huimin District, Hohhot City, Inner Mongolia Autonomous Region, at the southern foot of the Daqing Mountains. The prison covers an area of 150 mu (approximately 24.7 acres). It is a prison in western Inner Mongolia specifically designated to house elderly, infirm, and disabled inmates.

Originally the division for elderly, sick, and disabled prisoners within the Laowopu Prison of Inner Mongolia, it was officially upgraded to a standalone prison with government approval in 1998 and was initially named Tumote Prison. In 2003, it was renamed Hohhot No. 4 Prison.

The prison comprises 10 administrative departments, 6 prison wards, a hospital, a riot control unit, and a guard unit.

The prison-run enterprise, Hohhot No. 4 Industry and Trade Co., Ltd., primarily engages in garment manufacturing and the processing of electronic components.

== See also ==
- List of prisons in Inner Mongolia
