= Arxan =

Arxan 阿尔山市 • ᠷᠠᠰᠢᠶᠠᠨ ᠬᠣᠲᠠ
- County-level city
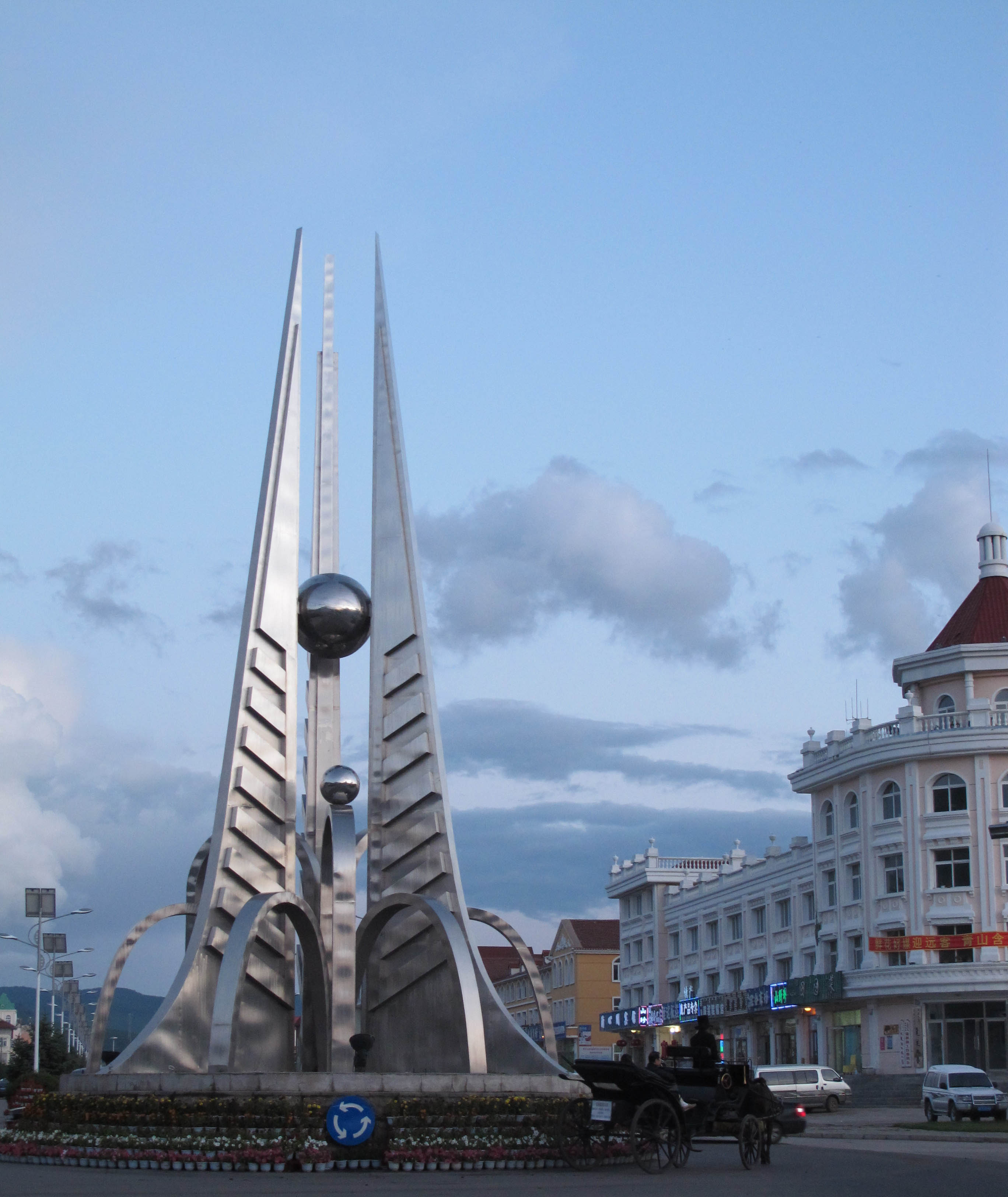

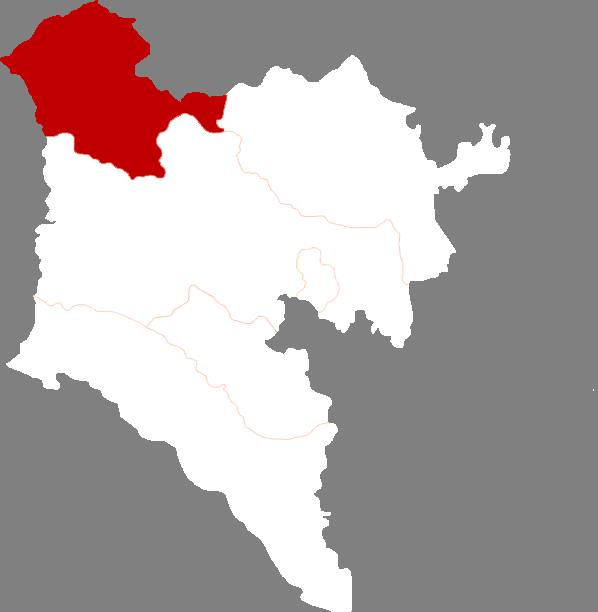
- Location of Arxan City jurisdiction in the Hinggan League

- Location in Inner Mongolia Arxan (China)
- Coordinates: 47°11′N 119°57′E
- Country: China
- Autonomous region: Inner Mongolia
- League: Hinggan
- County-level city established: June 1996
- Municipal seat: Wenquan Subdistrict

Area
  - County-level city: 7,408.7 km^{2} (2,860.5 sq mi)
  - Urban: 15.40 km^{2} (5.95 sq mi)
- Elevation: 1,003 m (3,291 ft)

Population (2020)
  - County-level city: 32,301
  - Density: 4.3599/km^{2} (11.292/sq mi)
  - Urban: 47,800
- Time zone: UTC+8 (China Standard)
- Postal code: 137800
- Area code: 0482
- Website: www.aes.gov.cn

Arxan

Chinese name
- Simplified Chinese: 阿尔山
- Traditional Chinese: 阿爾山
Transcriptions
Standard Mandarin
- Hanyu Pinyin: Ā'ěrshān

Mongolian name
- Mongolian Cyrillic: Рашаан хот
- Mongolian script: ᠷᠠᠰᠢᠶᠠᠨ ᠬᠣᠲᠠ
Transcriptions
- SASM/GNC: Arxaan hôt

Arxan (Mongolian: ᠷᠠᠰᠢᠶᠠᠨ lit. "Hot Springs") is a county-level city in the Hinggan League of northeastern Inner Mongolia, China.

== Geography and climate ==
Arxan is located in the northwest of Hinggan League, with latitude ranging from 46° 39' to 47° 39' N and longitude ranging from 119° 28' to 121° 23' E; the maximal north–south extent is 118 km (73 mi), while the maximal east–west width is 142 km (88 mi). It spans part of the southwest of the Greater Khingan Range.

Due to the upper-mid latitude and elevation of around 1,000 m (3,280 ft), the climate of Arxan is a subarctic (Köppen Dwc), with strong monsoonal influence, severely cold winters and warm, rainy summers, and low temperatures averaging below freezing for eight calendar months; the monthly 24-hour average temperature stays below freezing for six calendar months. The monthly 24-hour average temperature ranges from −24.8 °C or −12.6 °F in January to 17.1 °C or 62.8 °F in July, and the annual mean is −2.31 °C or 27.8 °F. For much of the year, diurnal temperature variation is large and frequently in excess of 15 °C or 27 °F. Nearly three-fourths of the annual precipitation occurs from June to September; however, precipitation is frequent year-round, with both frequency and relative humidity peaking in summer and there being a secondary humidity peak during the winter.

Climate data for Arxan, elevation 997 m (3,271 ft), (1991–2020 normals), extremes 1952-present
Month	Jan	Feb	Mar	Apr	May	Jun	Jul	Aug	Sep	Oct	Nov	Dec	Year
Record high °C (°F)	2.6 (36.7)	5.9 (42.6)	18.8 (65.8)	27.2 (81.0)	32.3 (90.1)	36.0 (96.8)	35.7 (96.3)	35.5 (95.9)	30.9 (87.6)	25.3 (77.5)	12.8 (55.0)	4.8 (40.6)	36.0 (96.8)
Mean daily maximum °C (°F)	−17.1 (1.2)	−11.8 (10.8)	−3.5 (25.7)	7.9 (46.2)	16.8 (62.2)	21.9 (71.4)	24.3 (75.7)	22.5 (72.5)	16.9 (62.4)	7.2 (45.0)	−5.3 (22.5)	−14.9 (5.2)	5.4 (41.7)
Daily mean °C (°F)	−24.4 (−11.9)	−20.3 (−4.5)	−11.0 (12.2)	1.0 (33.8)	9.3 (48.7)	14.7 (58.5)	17.8 (64.0)	15.6 (60.1)	8.8 (47.8)	−0.4 (31.3)	−12.3 (9.9)	−21.6 (−6.9)	−1.9 (28.6)
Mean daily minimum °C (°F)	−30.1 (−22.2)	−27.0 (−16.6)	−18.3 (−0.9)	−6.1 (21.0)	1.1 (34.0)	7.0 (44.6)	11.4 (52.5)	9.3 (48.7)	1.9 (35.4)	−6.7 (19.9)	−18.4 (−1.1)	−27.3 (−17.1)	−8.6 (16.5)
Record low °C (°F)	−45.7 (−50.3)	−45.0 (−49.0)	−40.8 (−41.4)	−27.6 (−17.7)	−14.3 (6.3)	−7.4 (18.7)	−0.6 (30.9)	−3.4 (25.9)	−13.8 (7.2)	−26.2 (−15.2)	−38.4 (−37.1)	−44.5 (−48.1)	−45.7 (−50.3)
Average precipitation mm (inches)	5.4 (0.21)	5.1 (0.20)	9.9 (0.39)	21.8 (0.86)	40.6 (1.60)	78.4 (3.09)	118.9 (4.68)	94.1 (3.70)	47.2 (1.86)	26.3 (1.04)	11.9 (0.47)	8.8 (0.35)	468.4 (18.45)
Average precipitation days (≥ 0.1 mm)	13.4	9.6	9.9	8.7	9.9	14.7	15.9	14.4	10.2	8.9	12.9	16.0	144.5
Average snowy days	19.6	15.0	14.7	10.5	3.8	0.3	0	0	1.6	9.8	17.7	21.4	114.4
Average relative humidity (%)	72	71	65	53	50	67	75	76	68	64	71	74	67
Mean monthly sunshine hours	183.7	210.0	262.3	254.3	269.2	251.4	242.6	242.8	229.2	207.3	162.9	155.6	2,671.3
Percentage possible sunshine	66	72	71	62	57	53	51	56	62	63	59	59	61
Source: China Meteorological Administration extremes

== Administrative divisions ==
Arxan is divided into 4 subdistricts and 4 towns.

Name	Simplified Chinese	Hanyu Pinyin	Mongolian (Hudum Script)	Mongolian (Cyrillic)	Administrative division code
Subdistricts
Linhai Subdistrict	林海街道	Línhǎi Jiēdào	ᠯᠢᠨ ᠬᠠᠢ ᠵᠡᠭᠡᠯᠢ ᠭᠤᠳᠤᠮᠵᠢ	Лин хай зээл гудамж	152202001
Xincheng Subdistrict	新城街道	Xīnchéng Jiēdào	ᠰᠢᠨ᠎ᠡ ᠬᠣᠲᠠ ᠵᠡᠭᠡᠯᠢ ᠭᠤᠳᠤᠮᠵᠢ	Шинэ хот зээл гудамж	152202002
Wenquan Subdistrict	温泉街道	Wēnquán Jiēdào	ᠸᠧᠨ ᠴᠢᠦᠸᠠᠨ ᠵᠡᠭᠡᠯᠢ ᠭᠤᠳᠤᠮᠵᠢ	Вен чиован зээл гудамж	152202003
Irbes Subdistrict	伊尔施街道	Yī'ěrshī Jiēdào	ᠢᠷᠪᠢᠰ ᠵᠡᠭᠡᠯᠢ ᠭᠤᠳᠤᠮᠵᠢ	Ирвэс зээл гудамж	152202004
Towns
Tianchi Town	天池镇	Tiānchí Zhèn	ᠲᠢᠶᠠᠨ ᡂᠢ ᠪᠠᠯᠭᠠᠰᠤ	Даяан циг балгас	152202100
Bailang Town	白狼镇	Báiláng Zhèn	ᠪᠠᠢ ᠯᠠᠩ ᠪᠠᠯᠭᠠᠰᠤ	Бай лан балгас	152202101
Wuchagou Town	五岔沟镇	Wǔchàgōu Zhèn	ᠡᠦ ᠴᠠ ᠭᠧᠦ ᠪᠠᠯᠭᠠᠰᠤ	Үү ца гүү балгас	152202102
Mingshuihe Town	明水河镇	Míngshuǐhé Zhèn	ᠮᠢᠩ ᠱᠦᠢ ᠾᠧ ᠪᠠᠯᠭᠠᠰᠤ	Мин шүй ге балгас	152202103

== Tourism ==
Arxan National Forest Park is located in Arxan. The park attracts tourists drawn by its landscape of solidified lava formations, crater lakes and dense forests.

== Transportation ==
Arxan is served by the Arxan Yi'ershi Airport.
