= Shenyang University of Chemical Technology =

University in China

- 沈阳化工大学
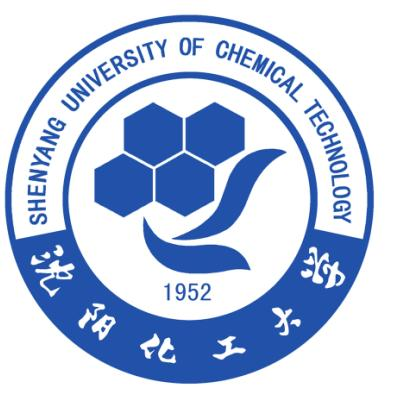
- Other names: Huagong Daxue, 化大, SUCT
- Former names: Shenyang Institute of Chemical Technology
- Type: Provisional
- Established: 1952
- Accreditation: China Ministry Of Education
- Academic affiliations: Canadian Counsel of Professional Engineers (CCPE)
- Principal: Pang Yu Chun
- Academic staff: 1,100
- Students: 20,000
- Undergraduates: 18,500
- Postgraduates: 4,000
- Location: Shenyang, Liaoning, China
- Colors: Blue and white
- Website: english.syuct.edu.cn

Shenyang University of Chemical Technology (SYUCT or SUCT) is a public university in Shenyang, Liaoning, China under the provincial government. It publishes extensive research in chemistry and physical sciences, as well as engineering.

It has become a multi-level teaching system for postgraduates, undergraduates, and the education of Branch Institute (state-owned and society-run), foreign students, adults, and continuous education.

== History ==
In 1952, Shenyang Chemical Industry Technical School was established. In 1958 it was upgraded to a college and named Shenyang Institute of Chemical Technology. In 1960, the name was changed to Liaoning University of Science and Technology. In 1962, it became the Shenyang Institute of Chemical Technology. On January 21, 2010, it was renamed Shenyang University of Chemical Technology.

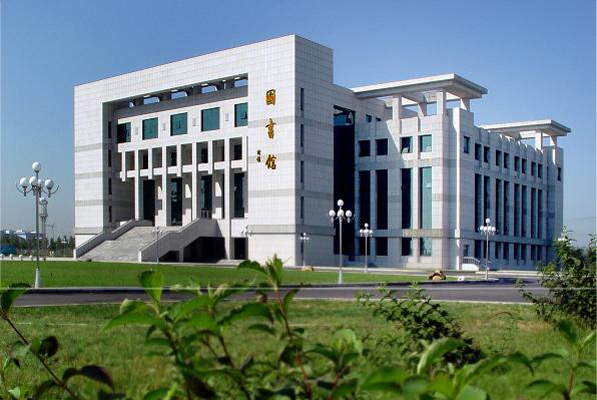
SUCT Library

== Achievements ==
SUCT was awarded 14 teaching achievements was at the provincial level, including two first, 10 second, and two third.

Since the 9th Five-year Project, SUCT has undertaken and accomplished over 400 scientific and research projects from the state, the province (ministry), the city and enterprises; publishing around 2,000 academic articles.

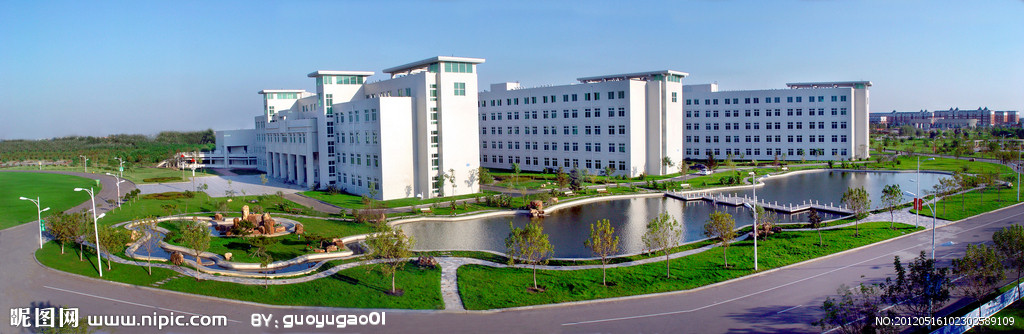
Department of Chemical Engineering

== International relations ==
SUCT has established friendly international cooperation relationships with more than 20 universities and scientific research institutes in Japan, Britain, Russia, USA, etc.

SUCT is affiliated with Bedfordshire University (UK) for 3+2 model joint education, for 2+3 model with Ivanovo State University of Chemical Technology (Russia), for 3+1 model with Westscotland University (UK), and the graduates will be given certificates and diplomas from both SUCT and foreign universities.

== Schools and departments ==
SUCT teaches chemical and computer engineering. The university is affiliated with the Canadian Counsel for Professional Engineers (CCPE). SUCT is composed of 12 colleges or departments:

- College of Chemical Engineering
- Applied Chemistry
- Environmental and Biological Engineering
- Material Sciences & Engineering
- Mechanical Engineering
- Information Engineering
- Computer Science & Technology
- Economics Administration
- Keya College
- College of Adult Education
- Department of foreign Language
- Department of Mathematics & Science
- Department of Postgraduates
- Social Science
- Department of Physical Education

SUCT offers 34 undergraduate courses, 12 authorized disciplines for master's degree, and one in the field of Master in Engineering. SUCT provides higher degree courses to on-job graduate to continue their education for higher degree and has five disciplines for doctorates in affiliation with domestic and overseas universities. SUCT has three major subjects, one major lab at provincial level, as well as 40 kinds of labs.

The following majors are studied in English:

- Chemical Engineering
- Computer Engineering
- Electrical Engineering
- Electronics Engineering
- International Business and Accounting
- Mechanical Engineering
- Software Engineering

== Staff ==
SUCT has 813 professional teachers, including 104 senior teachers, 308 vice-senior teachers. Above 50 are the experts who are awarded the subsidy of the State Council, outstanding provincial-level teachers and provincial or municipal level heads of department.

== Enrollment ==
Approximately 18,000 students are enrolled at the university. Students come from primarily Liaoning Province, and others come from provinces across China.

=== International students ===
More than 200 students from Tanzania, Bangladesh, Ghana, Mauritius, India, Nepal, Nigeria, and Pakistan study under the graduate and master programmes of engineering fields and business.
