= Liang Tiecheng =

Chinese politician

Liang Tiecheng (b. November 1956, Chinese: 梁铁城), a native of Harqin Left Wing, Liaoning, is a Mongolian politician in the People's Republic of China.

== Biography ==
Liang Tiecheng became a member of the Chinese Communist Party in August 1976, entered the workforce in July 1975, graduated from the postgraduate program of the Central Party School's training department with a specialization in economic management. In February 1994, he held the position of secretary general of the Chifeng Municipal Committee in the Inner Mongolia Autonomous Region. In June 1995, he held the position of standing committee member and secretary general of the CCP Chifeng Municipal Committee. In March 2000, he was appointed as deputy secretary of the Hulunbeier League Committee. In September 2001, he held the position of deputy secretary of the CCP Hulunbuir League Committee and Mayor of Hulunbuir.

In February 2002, he held the position of deputy secretary of the Hulunbuir Municipal Committee. In January 2003, he assumed the role of mayor of Hulunbuir. In January 2003, he was designated as secretary of the CCP Hulunbuir Municipal Committee. In December 2006, he was designated as the director of the Development and Reform Commission of the Inner Mongolia Autonomous Region. In January 2013, he was appointed vice chairman of the Committee of the Inner Mongolia Autonomous Region of the Chinese People's Political Consultative Conference and director of the Development and Reform Commission of the Autonomous Region (Chinese: 内蒙古自治区发展和改革委员会). In January 2015, he simultaneously relinquished his position as director of the Development and Reform Commission of the Inner Mongolia Autonomous Region.
