= Jalaid Banner =

Jalaid Banner 扎赉特旗 • ᠵᠠᠯᠠᠢᠳ ᠬᠣᠰᠢᠭᠤ
- Banner
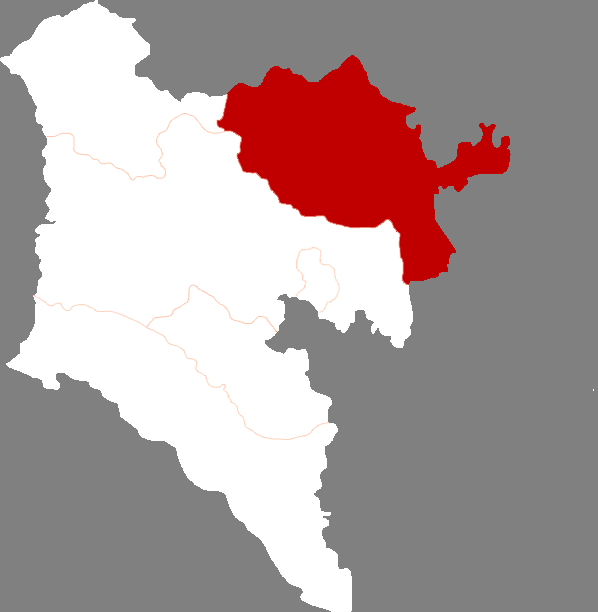
- Map of Jalaid Banner in Hinggan League, Inner Mongolia, China

- Location in Inner Mongolia Jalaid (China)
- Coordinates: 46°43′N 122°54′E
- Country: China
- Autonomous region: Inner Mongolia
- League: Hinggan League
- Banner seat: Inder

Area
  - Total: 11,000 km^{2} (4,200 sq mi)
- Elevation: 192 m (630 ft)

Population (2020)
  - Total: 315,153
  - Density: 29/km^{2} (74/sq mi)
- Time zone: UTC+8 (China Standard Time)
- Postal code: 137600
- Area code: 0482
- Website: www.zltq.gov.cn

Jalaid Banner

Chinese name
- Simplified Chinese: 扎赉特旗
- Traditional Chinese: 扎賚特旗
Transcriptions
Standard Mandarin
- Hanyu Pinyin: Zālàitè Qí

Mongolian name
- Mongolian Cyrillic: Жалайд хошуу
- Mongolian script: ᠵᠠᠯᠠᠢᠳ ᠬᠣᠰᠢᠭᠤ
Transcriptions
- SASM/GNC: Jalaid qosiɣu

Jalaid Banner (Mongolian: ᠵᠠᠯᠠᠢᠳ ᠬᠣᠰᠢᠭᠤ; Chinese: 扎赉特旗) is a banner under the jurisdiction of Hinggan League in the northeast of the Inner Mongolia, China. Jalaid Mongols live here.

== Administrative divisions ==
Jalaid Banner has jurisdiction over 8 towns, 2 townships, and 3 sums. The banner's seat of government is located in Inder.

Name	Simplified Chinese	Hanyu Pinyin	Mongolian (Hudum Script)	Mongolian (Cyrillic)	Administrative division code
Towns
Inder Town	音德尔镇	Yīndé'ěr Zhèn	ᠢᠨᠳᠡᠷ ᠪᠠᠯᠭᠠᠰᠤ	Индра балгас	152223100
Xinlin Town	新林镇	Xīnlín Zhèn	ᠰᠢᠨᠯᠢᠨ ᠪᠠᠯᠭᠠᠰᠤ	Шнлэн балгас	152223101
Bayan Gol Town	巴彦高勒镇	Bāyàngāolè Zhèn	ᠪᠠᠶᠠᠨᠭᠣᠣᠯ ᠪᠠᠯᠭᠠᠰᠤ	Баянгол балгас	152223102
Hurel Town	胡尔勒镇	Hú'ěrlè Zhèn	ᠬᠦᠷᠡᠯ ᠪᠠᠯᠭᠠᠰᠤ	Хүрэл балгас	152223103
Arban Ger Town	阿尔本格勒镇	Ā'ěrběngélè Zhèn	ᠠᠷᠪᠠᠨᠭᠡᠷ ᠪᠠᠯᠭᠠᠰᠤ	Арвангэр балгас	152223104
Badrah Town	巴达尔胡镇	Bādá'ěrhú Zhèn	ᠪᠠᠳᠠᠷᠠᠬᠤ ᠪᠠᠯᠭᠠᠰᠤ	Бадрах балгас	152223105
Temeji Town	图牧吉镇	Túmùjí Zhèn	ᠲᠡᠮᠡᠭᠡᠵᠢ ᠪᠠᠯᠭᠠᠰᠤ	Тэмээж балгас	152223106
Holbo Town	好力保镇	Hǎolìbǎo Zhèn	ᠬᠣᠯᠪᠣᠭ᠎ᠠ ᠪᠠᠯᠭᠠᠰᠤ	Холбоо балгас	152223107
Townships
Bayan Jalag Township	巴彦扎拉嘎乡	Bāyànzhālāgā Xiāng	ᠪᠠᠶᠠᠨᠵᠢᠯᠠᠭ᠎ᠠ ᠰᠢᠶᠠᠩ	Баянжлаа шиян	152223204
Nun Moron Township	努文木仁乡	Nǔwénmùrén Xiāng	ᠨᠤᠨᠮᠦ᠋ᠷᠡᠨ ᠰᠢᠶᠠᠩ	Нонамран шиян	152223205
Sums
Bayan Ulan Sum	巴彦乌兰苏木	Bāyànwūlán Sūmù	ᠪᠠᠶᠠᠨᠤ᠋ᠯᠠᠭᠠᠨ ᠰᠤᠮᠤ	Баянөлган сум	152223201
Bulgan Hua Sum	宝力根花苏木	Bǎolìgēnhuā Sūmù	ᠪᠤᠯᠠᠭᠠᠨᠬᠤᠸᠠ ᠰᠤᠮᠤ	Булганухаа сум	152223202
Aldart Sum	阿拉达尔吐苏木	Ālādá'ěrtǔ Sūmù	ᠠᠯᠳᠠᠷᠲᠤ ᠰᠤᠮᠤ	Алдарт сум	152223203

Others:

- Temeji Compulsory Isolation and Rehabilitation Center (内蒙古自治区图牧吉强制隔离戒毒所)
- Eastern Branch of Inner Mongolia Prison Administration (内蒙古自治区监狱管理局东部分局)
- Breeding Stock Farm (种畜场)
- Bayi Farm (八一牧场)
- Badrah Farm (巴达尔胡农场)

== Geography ==
Jalaid is surrounded by the Shenshan Mountains.

== Climate ==
Climate data for Jalaid Banner, elevation 219 m (719 ft), (1991–2020 normals, extremes 1991–present)
Month	Jan	Feb	Mar	Apr	May	Jun	Jul	Aug	Sep	Oct	Nov	Dec	Year
Record high °C (°F)	5.3 (41.5)	11.7 (53.1)	24.9 (76.8)	34.2 (93.6)	41.3 (106.3)	40.5 (104.9)	39.9 (103.8)	38.7 (101.7)	35.2 (95.4)	31.5 (88.7)	18.8 (65.8)	8.5 (47.3)	41.3 (106.3)
Mean daily maximum °C (°F)	−9.8 (14.4)	−4.1 (24.6)	4.4 (39.9)	14.5 (58.1)	22.5 (72.5)	27.3 (81.1)	28.7 (83.7)	27.0 (80.6)	21.8 (71.2)	12.7 (54.9)	0.5 (32.9)	−8.6 (16.5)	11.4 (52.5)
Daily mean °C (°F)	−15.8 (3.6)	−10.6 (12.9)	−2.1 (28.2)	8.0 (46.4)	16.0 (60.8)	21.4 (70.5)	23.6 (74.5)	21.5 (70.7)	15.2 (59.4)	6.3 (43.3)	−5.2 (22.6)	−14.1 (6.6)	5.4 (41.6)
Mean daily minimum °C (°F)	−21.0 (−5.8)	−16.1 (3.0)	−7.9 (17.8)	1.5 (34.7)	9.5 (49.1)	15.6 (60.1)	18.7 (65.7)	16.5 (61.7)	9.4 (48.9)	0.7 (33.3)	−10 (14)	−19.1 (−2.4)	−0.2 (31.7)
Record low °C (°F)	−38.4 (−37.1)	−38.9 (−38.0)	−24.6 (−12.3)	−10.3 (13.5)	−0.9 (30.4)	3.5 (38.3)	10.9 (51.6)	6.7 (44.1)	−1.7 (28.9)	−16.8 (1.8)	−29.1 (−20.4)	−35.9 (−32.6)	−38.9 (−38.0)
Average precipitation mm (inches)	1.5 (0.06)	2.1 (0.08)	4.2 (0.17)	16.6 (0.65)	31.0 (1.22)	84.1 (3.31)	125.9 (4.96)	90.5 (3.56)	45.8 (1.80)	14.0 (0.55)	3.2 (0.13)	3.8 (0.15)	422.7 (16.64)
Average precipitation days (≥ 0.1 mm)	2.5	1.7	3.0	4.4	7.6	12.3	13.3	11.1	7.7	4.2	2.7	3.9	74.4
Average snowy days	5.1	3.2	4.6	1.9	0.2	0.1	0	0	0.1	1.6	4.3	6.2	27.3
Average relative humidity (%)	59	49	40	37	42	58	70	71	60	50	52	60	54
Mean monthly sunshine hours	190.2	210.6	259.9	255.9	273.8	265.3	264.7	263.6	253.6	229.3	181.0	161.5	2,809.4
Percentage possible sunshine	68	72	70	63	59	56	56	61	68	69	65	61	64
Source: China Meteorological Administration

Climate data for Hu'erle Town, Jalaid Banner, elevation 333 m (1,093 ft), (1991–2020 normals)
Month	Jan	Feb	Mar	Apr	May	Jun	Jul	Aug	Sep	Oct	Nov	Dec	Year
Mean daily maximum °C (°F)	−9.3 (15.3)	−3.9 (25.0)	4.1 (39.4)	14.1 (57.4)	22.0 (71.6)	26.4 (79.5)	28.2 (82.8)	26.5 (79.7)	21.4 (70.5)	12.7 (54.9)	0.4 (32.7)	−8.3 (17.1)	11.2 (52.2)
Daily mean °C (°F)	−16.4 (2.5)	−11.4 (11.5)	−3.0 (26.6)	7.0 (44.6)	14.9 (58.8)	20.0 (68.0)	22.5 (72.5)	20.3 (68.5)	14.0 (57.2)	5.2 (41.4)	−6.3 (20.7)	−14.8 (5.4)	4.3 (39.8)
Mean daily minimum °C (°F)	−22.3 (−8.1)	−18.1 (−0.6)	−10.1 (13.8)	−0.7 (30.7)	7.1 (44.8)	13.2 (55.8)	16.7 (62.1)	14.3 (57.7)	6.8 (44.2)	−1.7 (28.9)	−12.4 (9.7)	−20.5 (−4.9)	−2.3 (27.8)
Average precipitation mm (inches)	1.7 (0.07)	1.9 (0.07)	4.3 (0.17)	16.1 (0.63)	35.3 (1.39)	88.9 (3.50)	145.3 (5.72)	103.3 (4.07)	40.7 (1.60)	15.5 (0.61)	4.5 (0.18)	4.1 (0.16)	461.6 (18.17)
Average precipitation days (≥ 0.1 mm)	2.6	1.8	2.8	4.6	7.1	12.2	13.6	12.2	7.5	4.1	3.0	4.0	75.5
Average snowy days	3.9	2.8	4.2	2.0	0.2	0	0	0	0.1	1.4	4.0	5.3	23.9
Average relative humidity (%)	59	49	40	36	42	60	71	72	61	50	53	61	55
Mean monthly sunshine hours	213	225.1	274.4	271.1	289.1	269.1	259.9	267.3	256.3	238.1	196.6	185.7	2,945.7
Percentage possible sunshine	76	77	74	66	62	57	55	62	69	72	71	70	68
Source: China Meteorological Administration

== Economy ==
Major economic sectors include timber production, sheep farming, cereal crops and livestock export.

== Town twinning ==
It has had a formal friendship link with Portsmouth, England since May 2004.
