= Tuquan County =

Tuquan County 突泉县 • ᠲᠦᠴᠢᠤᠸᠠᠨ ᠰᠢᠶᠠᠨ T'u-ch'üan
- County
- Location in Inner Mongolia Tuquan (China)
- Coordinates: 45°23′N 121°36′E
- Country: China
- Autonomous region: Inner Mongolia
- League: Hinggan
- County seat: Tuquan Town

Area
  - Total: 4,800 km^{2} (1,900 sq mi)
- Elevation: 303 m (994 ft)

Population (2020)
  - Total: 220,668
  - Density: 46/km^{2} (120/sq mi)
- Time zone: UTC+8 (China Standard)
- Website: www.tq.gov.cn

Tuquan County

Chinese name
- Simplified Chinese: 突泉县
- Traditional Chinese: 突泉縣
Transcriptions
Standard Mandarin
- Hanyu Pinyin: Tūquán Xiàn

Mongolian name
- Mongolian Cyrillic: Тучуань шянь
- Mongolian script: ᠲᠦᠴᠢᠤᠸᠠᠨ ᠰᠢᠶᠠᠨ
Transcriptions
- SASM/GNC: Tüčiuvan siyan

Tuquan County (Mongolian: ᠲᠦᠴᠢᠤᠸᠠᠨ ᠰᠢᠶᠠᠨ; Chinese: 突泉县) is a county of Inner Mongolia, China, facing Jilin province to the east. It is under the administration of Hinggan League, bordering Horqin Right Middle Banner to the south and Horqin Right Front Banner to the north.

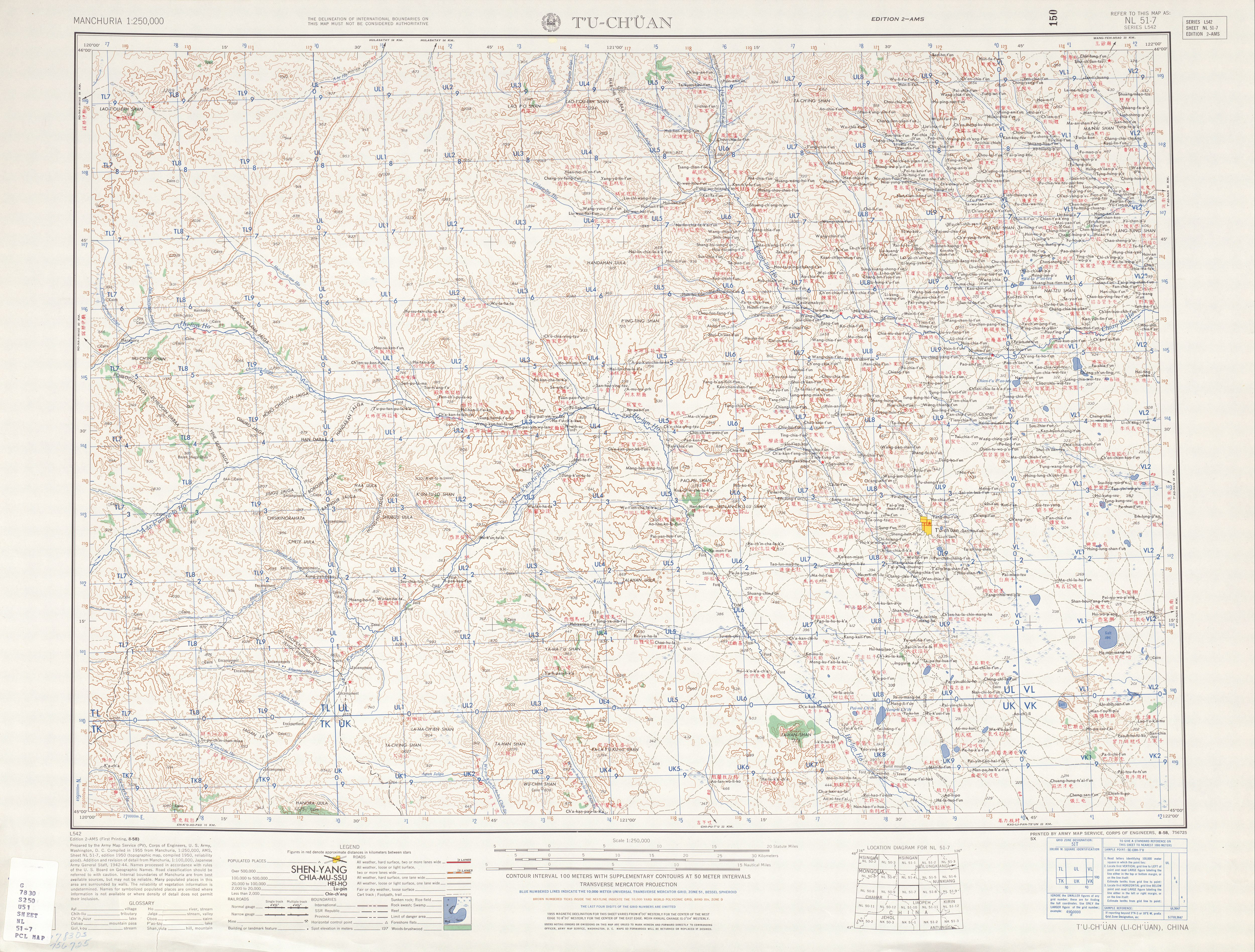
Map including Tuquan (labeled as T'u-ch'üan (Li-ch'üan) 突泉 (醴泉)) (AMS, 1955)

== Administrative divisions ==
Tuquan County is divided into 6 towns and 3 townships.

Name	Simplified Chinese	Hanyu Pinyin	Mongolian (Hudum Script)	Mongolian (Cyrillic)	Administrative division code
Towns
Tuquan Town	突泉镇	Tūquán Zhèn	ᠲᠦᠴᠢᠦᠸᠠᠨ ᠪᠠᠯᠭᠠᠰᠤ	Дөчиован балгас	152224100
Liuhu Town	六户镇	Liùhù Zhèn	ᠯᠢᠦ ᠬᠤ ᠪᠠᠯᠭᠠᠰᠤ	Лиу хоо балгас	152224101
East Durulj Town	东杜尔基镇	Dōng Dù'ěrjī Zhèn	ᠵᠡᠭᠦᠨ ᠳᠦᠷᠦᠯᠵᠢ ᠪᠠᠯᠭᠠᠰᠤ	Зүүн дөрөлж балгас	152224102
Yong'an Town	永安镇	Yǒng'ān Zhèn	ᠶᠦᠩ ᠠᠨ ᠪᠠᠯᠭᠠᠰᠤ	Юн аан балгас	152224103
Shuiquan Town	水泉镇	Shuǐquán Zhèn	ᠱᠦᠢᠴᠢᠦᠸᠠᠨ ᠪᠠᠯᠭᠠᠰᠤ	Шүйчиован балгас	152224104
Baoshi Town	宝石镇	Bǎoshí Zhèn	ᠪᠣᠣ ᠱᠢ ᠪᠠᠯᠭᠠᠰᠤ	Буу ши балгас	152224105
Townships
Xuetian Township	学田乡	Xuétián Xiāng	ᠰᠢᠦᠸᠡᠢ ᠲᠢᠶᠠᠨ ᠰᠢᠶᠠᠩ	Шиовай даяан шиян	152224200
Jiulong Township	九龙乡	Jiǔlóng Xiāng	ᠵᠢᠦ ᠯᠦᠩ ᠰᠢᠶᠠᠩ	Жүү лүн шиян	152224201
Taiping Township	太平乡	Tàipíng Xiāng	ᠲᠠᠢᠫᠢᠩ ᠰᠢᠶᠠᠩ	Дайпин шиян	152224202

Other: Inner Mongolia State-owned Durulj Farm (内蒙古自治区国营杜尔基农场)

== Climate ==
Climate data for Tuquan, elevation 312 m (1,024 ft), (1991–2020 normals, extremes 1981–present)
Month	Jan	Feb	Mar	Apr	May	Jun	Jul	Aug	Sep	Oct	Nov	Dec	Year
Record high °C (°F)	7.1 (44.8)	13.1 (55.6)	28.7 (83.7)	33.0 (91.4)	41.4 (106.5)	41.2 (106.2)	40.6 (105.1)	37.9 (100.2)	35.7 (96.3)	30.7 (87.3)	18.4 (65.1)	9.3 (48.7)	41.4 (106.5)
Mean daily maximum °C (°F)	−7.7 (18.1)	−2.6 (27.3)	5.4 (41.7)	15.4 (59.7)	23.1 (73.6)	27.5 (81.5)	29.0 (84.2)	27.6 (81.7)	22.6 (72.7)	13.6 (56.5)	1.5 (34.7)	−6.7 (19.9)	12.4 (54.3)
Daily mean °C (°F)	−13.6 (7.5)	−9.3 (15.3)	−1.6 (29.1)	8.4 (47.1)	16.2 (61.2)	21.4 (70.5)	23.6 (74.5)	21.6 (70.9)	15.5 (59.9)	6.8 (44.2)	−4.3 (24.3)	−11.9 (10.6)	6.1 (42.9)
Mean daily minimum °C (°F)	−17.9 (−0.2)	−14.5 (5.9)	−7.8 (18.0)	1.5 (34.7)	9.2 (48.6)	15.2 (59.4)	18.3 (64.9)	16.0 (60.8)	9.0 (48.2)	0.9 (33.6)	−9.0 (15.8)	−16.1 (3.0)	0.4 (32.7)
Record low °C (°F)	−31.1 (−24.0)	−29.7 (−21.5)	−20.3 (−4.5)	−12.0 (10.4)	−2.6 (27.3)	3.3 (37.9)	10.0 (50.0)	7.0 (44.6)	−1.6 (29.1)	−18.0 (−0.4)	−26.0 (−14.8)	−28.1 (−18.6)	−31.1 (−24.0)
Average precipitation mm (inches)	1.5 (0.06)	1.7 (0.07)	4.7 (0.19)	11.5 (0.45)	35.4 (1.39)	85.6 (3.37)	130.5 (5.14)	68.2 (2.69)	37.0 (1.46)	11.2 (0.44)	3.8 (0.15)	2.7 (0.11)	393.8 (15.52)
Average precipitation days (≥ 0.1 mm)	2.0	1.7	3.1	3.4	6.7	12.0	12.8	9.9	6.8	3.8	2.5	2.8	67.5
Average snowy days	3.1	2.2	4.1	1.4	0.2	0	0	0	0.1	1.2	3.6	4.3	20.2
Average relative humidity (%)	49	42	37	33	39	55	68	68	56	46	49	51	49
Mean monthly sunshine hours	214.2	228.4	274.6	272.4	280.4	259.4	252.4	269.0	258.5	243.2	197.2	191.3	2,941
Percentage possible sunshine	75	77	74	67	61	56	54	63	70	73	70	71	68
Source: China Meteorological Administrationall-time May (All Time Extreme High) and July highs
