= Hinggan League =

Hingan League 兴安盟 ᠬᠢᠩᠭᠠᠨ ᠠᠢᠮᠠᠭ
- League
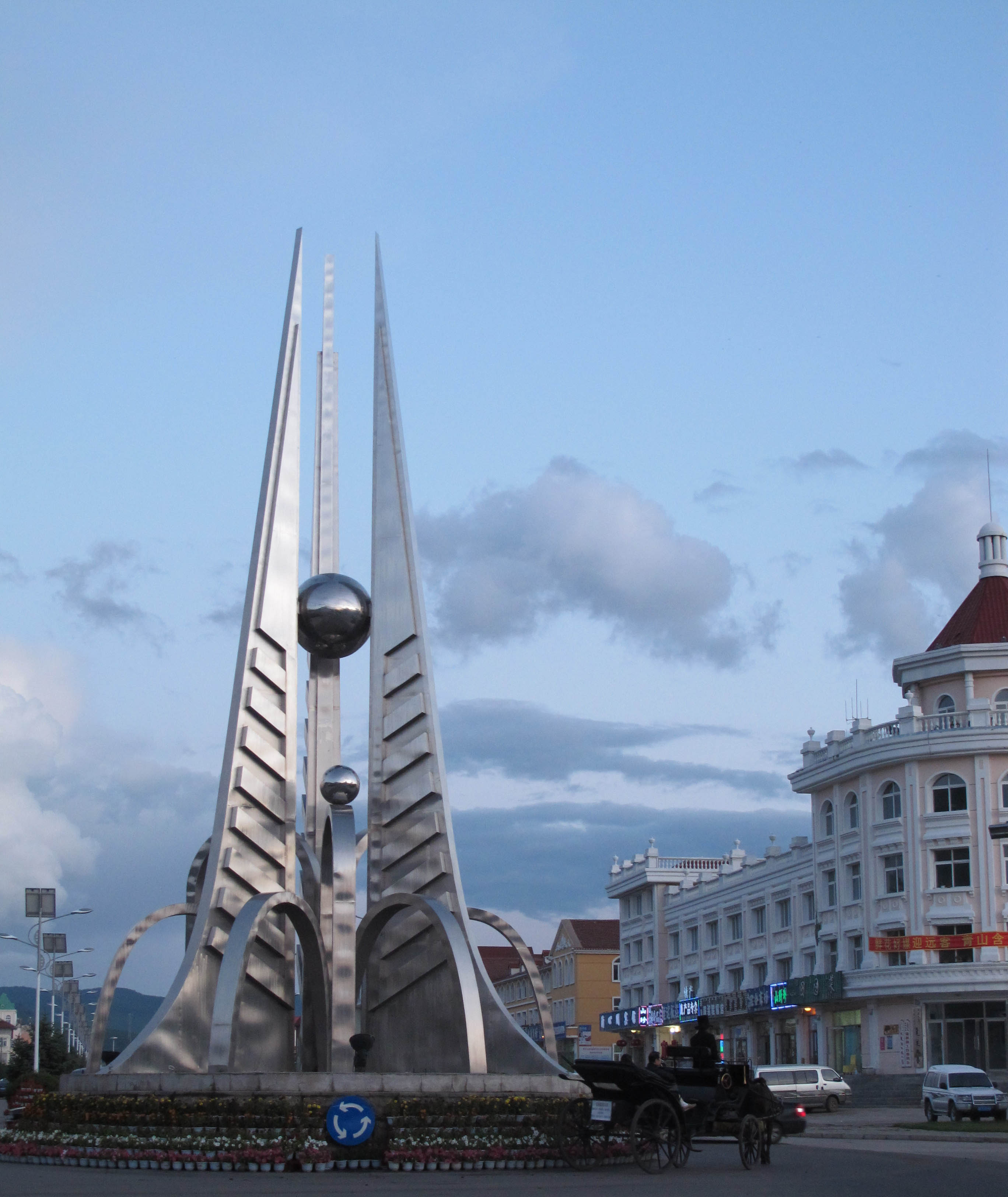
- Arxan, Hingan

- Location of Hingan League in Inner Mongolia
- Coordinates (Ulanhot): 46.07°N 122.09°E
- Country: China
- Region: Inner Mongolia
- League Seat of Government: Ulanhot

Area
  - Total: 59,806 km^{2} (23,091 sq mi)

Population (2010)
  - Total: 1,613,250
  - Density: 26.975/km^{2} (69.864/sq mi)

GDP
  - Total: CN¥ 50.2 billion US$ 8.1 billion
  - Per capita: CN¥ 31,391; US$ 5,040
- Time zone: UTC+8 (China Standard)
- ISO 3166 code: CN-NM-22
- Website: xam.gov.cn

Hinggan League

Chinese name
- Traditional Chinese: 興安盟
- Simplified Chinese: 兴安盟
Transcriptions
Standard Mandarin
- Hanyu Pinyin: Xīng’ān Méng

Mongolian name
- Mongolian Cyrillic: Хянган аймаг
- Mongolian script: ᠬᠢᠩᠭᠠᠨ ᠠᠢᠮᠠᠭ
Transcriptions
- SASM/GNC: Hinggan Aimag

The Hinggan League (Note: Chinese: 兴安盟; pinyin: Xīng’ān Méng; Mongolian: tr. Hinggan Aimag, Mongol Cyrillic: Хянган аймаг) is a prefecture-level subdivision of the Inner Mongolia Autonomous Region of the People's Republic of China. It borders Hulun Buir to the north, the Republic of Mongolia and Xilingol League to the west, Tongliao to the south and the provinces of Jilin and Heilongjiang to the east. The name is derived from the Greater Khingan mountain range that crosses the league from the northwest to the southeast.

== Administrative subdivisions ==
Hinggan league is divided into 2 county-level cities, 1 county and 3 banners:

Map
Name	Mongolian	Hanzi	Hanyu Pinyin	Population (2010)	Area (km^{2})	Density (/km^{2})
Ulanhot city	ᠤᠯᠠᠭᠠᠨᠬᠣᠲᠠ (Ulaɣanqota)	乌兰浩特市	Wūlánhàotè Shì	327,081	772	376
Arxan city	ᠷᠠᠰᠢᠶᠠᠨ ᠬᠣᠲᠠ (Arsiyan qota)	阿尔山市	Ā'ěrshān Shì	68,311	7,409	7
Tuquan County	ᠲᠦᠴᠢᠤᠸᠠᠨ ᠰᠢᠶᠠᠨ (Tüčiuvan siyan)	突泉县	Tūquán Xiàn	274,213	4,800	65
Horqin Right Front Banner (Horqin Barun Garun Omnod Banner)	ᠬᠣᠷᠴᠢᠨ ᠪᠠᠷᠠᠭᠤᠨ ᠭᠠᠷᠤᠨ ᠡᠮᠦᠨᠡᠳᠦ ᠬᠣᠰᠢᠭᠤ (Qorčin Baraɣun Ɣarun Emünedü qosiɣu)	科尔沁右翼前旗	Kē'ěrqìn Yòuyì Qián Qí	299,834	19,375	19
Horqin Right Middle Banner (Horqin Barun Garun Dundad Banner)	ᠬᠣᠷᠴᠢᠨ ᠪᠠᠷᠠᠭᠤᠨ ᠭᠠᠷᠤᠨ ᠳᠤᠮᠳᠠᠳᠤ ᠬᠣᠰᠢᠭᠤ (Qorčin Baraɣun Ɣarun Dumdadu qosiɣu)	科尔沁右翼中旗	Kē'ěrqìn Yòuyì Zhōng Qí	251,465	15,613	16
Jalaid Banner	ᠵᠠᠯᠠᠢᠳ ᠬᠣᠰᠢᠭᠤ (Jalaid qosiɣu)	扎赉特旗	Zhālàitè Qí	392,346	11,837	33

== Demographics ==
In 2000, Hinggan League had 1,588,787 inhabitants (26.57 per km^{2}).

Ethnic group	number	share
Han	852,684	53.67%
Mongols	652,385	41.06%
Manchu	71,653	4.51%
Koreans	6,240	0.39%
Hui	3,017	0.19%
Daur	1,168	0.07%
Xibe	568	0.04%
Oroqen	203	0.01%
Yi	154	0.01%
other	715	0.05%

== Literature ==
- 今日内蒙古: 兴安 [Inner Mongolia today: Hinggan]. Hohhot: Inner Mongolia People's Publishing House. 1997. ISBN 7-204-03542-9. 9+121 pages.
