= Tulihe =

Tulihe 图里河镇 • ᠲᠣᠣᠯᠢ ᠭᠣᠣᠯ ᠪᠠᠯᠭᠠᠰᠤ
- Town
- Location in Inner Mongolia
- Coordinates: 50°28′49″N 121°40′57″E
- Country: China
- Region: Inner Mongolia
- Prefecture-level city: Hulunbuir
- County-level city: Yakeshi
- Village-level divisions: 2 residential communities
- Elevation: 734 m (2,408 ft)
- Time zone: UTC+8 (China Standard)
- Area code: 0470

Tulihe (simplified Chinese: 图里河; traditional Chinese: 圖里河; pinyin: Túlǐhé) is a town under the administration of Yakeshi City in far northeastern Inner Mongolia, China, located 150 kilometres (93 mi) northeast of Yakeshi and 35 km (22 mi) south-southeast of Genhe. As of 2011, it has two residential communities (社区) under its administration.

== Climate ==
Tulihe has a monsoon-influenced subarctic climate (Köppen Dwc), with an average annual temperature of −3.9 °C (25.0 °F), colder than even Mohe County in Heilongjiang, about 284 km (176 mi) to the north-northeast. Lows average below freezing for nine calendar months and the 24-hour average temperature is below freezing for seven calendar months. Its location in a valley of the Greater Khingan Range at an elevation of 734 metres (2,408 ft), promoting temperature inversions, helps the temperature plummet at night, with an average diurnal temperature variation in excess of 15 °C (27 °F) in every month except July and August. Winters are long, severely cold, and very dry in terms of total precipitation, while summers are short and warm. The monthly 24-hour average temperature ranges from −28.4 °C (−19.1 °F) in January to 17.3 °C (63.1 °F) in July. A majority of the annual precipitation occurs in July and August alone. With monthly percent possible sunshine ranging from 45% in July to 73% in February, the town receives 2,548.1 hours of bright sunshine annually.

Climate data for Tulihe, elevation 733 m (2,405 ft), (1991–2020 normals, extremes 1957–present)
Month	Jan	Feb	Mar	Apr	May	Jun	Jul	Aug	Sep	Oct	Nov	Dec	Year
Record high °C (°F)	−3.3 (26.1)	5.9 (42.6)	16.0 (60.8)	27.5 (81.5)	34.1 (93.4)	37.9 (100.2)	35.9 (96.6)	35.5 (95.9)	32.0 (89.6)	26.7 (80.1)	12.3 (54.1)	2.2 (36.0)	37.9 (100.2)
Mean daily maximum °C (°F)	−18.7 (−1.7)	−11.9 (10.6)	−2.7 (27.1)	8.2 (46.8)	17.3 (63.1)	23.0 (73.4)	24.8 (76.6)	22.6 (72.7)	16.5 (61.7)	6.2 (43.2)	−7.7 (18.1)	−17.8 (0.0)	5.0 (41.0)
Daily mean °C (°F)	−28.4 (−19.1)	−23.3 (−9.9)	−12.6 (9.3)	0.2 (32.4)	8.8 (47.8)	14.6 (58.3)	17.3 (63.1)	14.6 (58.3)	7.4 (45.3)	−2.2 (28.0)	−16.4 (2.5)	−26.3 (−15.3)	−3.9 (25.1)
Mean daily minimum °C (°F)	−35.9 (−32.6)	−33.0 (−27.4)	−23.0 (−9.4)	−8.5 (16.7)	−1.1 (30.0)	5.4 (41.7)	10.2 (50.4)	7.9 (46.2)	−0.4 (31.3)	−9.8 (14.4)	−23.8 (−10.8)	−33.3 (−27.9)	−12.1 (10.2)
Record low °C (°F)	−49.1 (−56.4)	−50.2 (−58.4)	−44.1 (−47.4)	−32.2 (−26.0)	−16.3 (2.7)	−8.0 (17.6)	−3.6 (25.5)	−7.4 (18.7)	−14.2 (6.4)	−30.2 (−22.4)	−42.7 (−44.9)	−47.9 (−54.2)	−50.2 (−58.4)
Average precipitation mm (inches)	4.4 (0.17)	3.8 (0.15)	7.3 (0.29)	19.5 (0.77)	35.5 (1.40)	75.4 (2.97)	110.5 (4.35)	97.7 (3.85)	49.0 (1.93)	20.1 (0.79)	9.0 (0.35)	6.8 (0.27)	439 (17.29)
Average precipitation days (≥ 0.1 mm)	8.8	6.7	7.0	7.7	9.9	14.1	16.3	15.6	11.6	8.4	10.7	11.6	128.4
Average snowy days	11.5	9.4	9.6	8.9	2.7	0.2	0	0	1.8	8.7	13.6	14.6	81
Average relative humidity (%)	71	68	63	55	53	71	79	82	74	67	73	73	69
Mean monthly sunshine hours	176.2	208.9	264.1	246.0	253.6	248.2	221.7	211.8	207.9	198.1	164.0	147.6	2,548.1
Percentage possible sunshine	66	73	71	59	53	51	45	48	56	61	62	60	59
Source 1: China Meteorological Administration
Source 2: Météo Climat (record temperatures, mean maxima and minima, precipitation days)

== See also ==
- List of township-level divisions of Inner Mongolia
