= Yalu River (Nen River tributary) =

River in China

Coordinates: 39°56′N 124°19′E

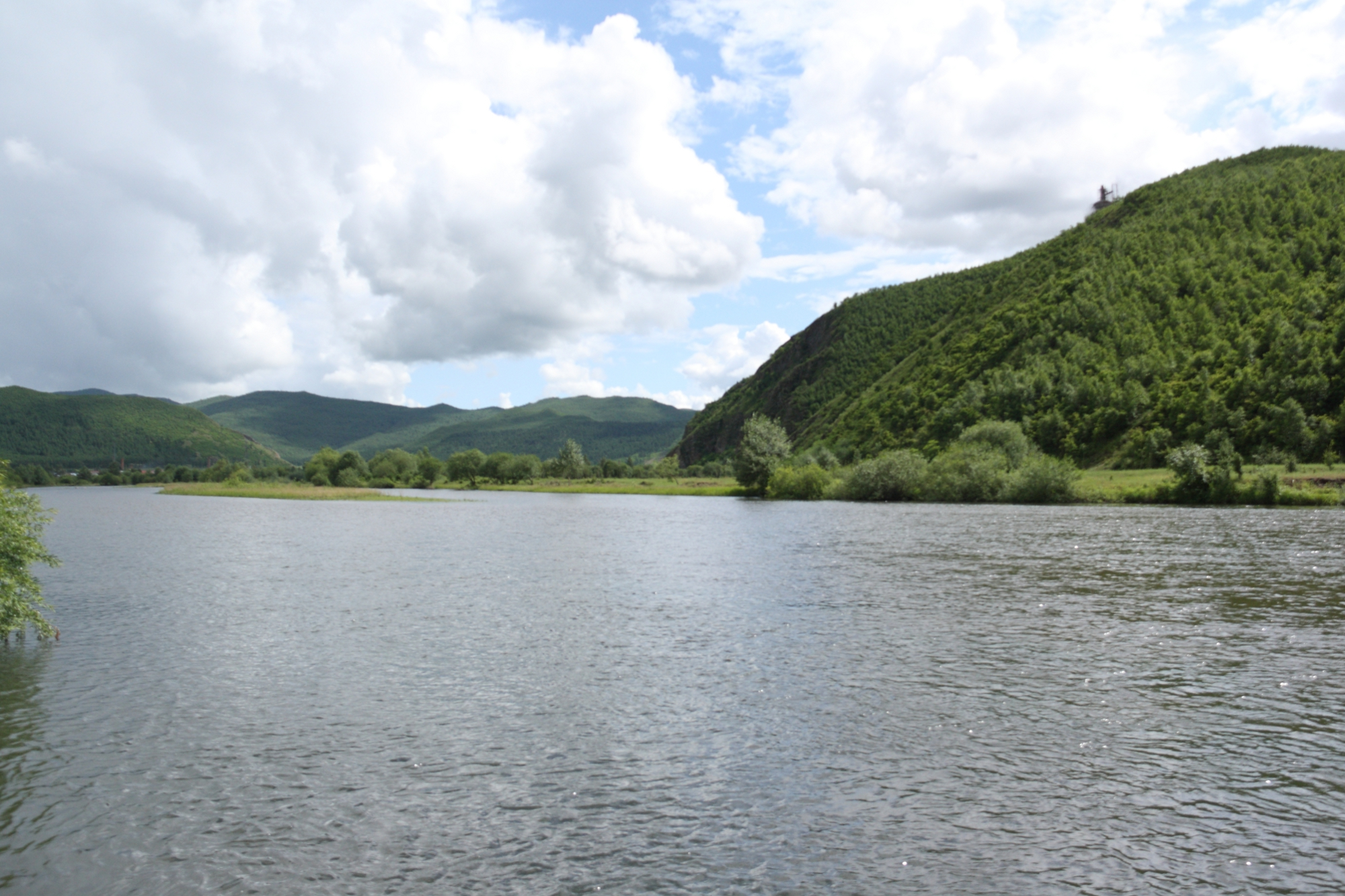
Yalu River in Greater Khingan Range, northeastern China

The Yalu River (Chinese: 雅鲁河; pinyin: Yǎlǔ Hé) is a river straddling the Chinese regions of Heilongjiang and Hulunbuir near the eastern border with Russia. As a tributary of the Nen River, the Yalu starts on the eastern slopes of the Greater Khingan Range, and flows in the general south-eastern direction through Zalantun in Hulunbei'er and Qiqihar in Heilongjiang. The Yalu flows from the west into the Nen River some 100 kilometres (62 mi) south of Qiqihar.

As the Nen then flows to the south and into the Songhua River, and the Songhua, to the east and northeast and into the Heilongjiang River, the Yalu River is part of the Heilongjiang River basin.
