= Xiangyang Subdistrict, Zhalantun =

Xiangyang Subdistrict 向阳街道
- Subdistrict
- Location in Inner Mongolia
- Coordinates: 47°59′4″N 122°44′42″E
- Country: People's Republic of China
- Autonomous region: Inner Mongolia
- Prefecture-level city: Hulunbuir
- County-level city: Zhalantun
- Time zone: UTC+8 (China Standard)

Xiangyang Subdistrict (Chinese: 向阳街道; pinyin: Xiàngyáng Jiēdào) is a subdistrict in Zhalantun, Inner Mongolia, China. As of 2018, it has four residential communities and one village under its administration.

== See also ==
- List of township-level divisions of Inner Mongolia
