= NZL =

NZL may refer to:

- New Zealand, ISO 3166-1 alpha-3 code NZL
- Zhalantun Chengjisihan Airport, IATA airport code NZL
