= Xinghua Subdistrict, Zhalantun =

Xinghua Subdistrict 兴华街道 ᠰᠢᠩ ᠬᠤᠸᠠ ᠵᠡᠭᠡᠯᠢ ᠭᠤᠳᠤᠮᠵᠢ
- Subdistrict
- Location in Inner Mongolia
- Coordinates: 48°00′58″N 122°43′42″E
- Country: People's Republic of China
- Region: Inner Mongolia
- Prefecture-level city: Hulunbuir
- County-level city: Zhalantun
- Village-level divisions: 5 residential communities
- Elevation: 318 m (1,043 ft)
- Time zone: UTC+8 (China Standard)
- Postal code: 162600
- Area code: 0470

Xinghua Subdistrict (simplified Chinese: 兴华街道; traditional Chinese: 興華街道; pinyin: Xīnghuá Jiēdào) Šin uxaa zeel gudamž (Mongolian: ᠰᠢᠩ
ᠬᠤᠸᠠ
ᠵᠡᠭᠡᠯᠢ
ᠭᠤᠳᠤᠮᠵᠢ}; Шин ухаа зээл гудамж) is a subdistrict and the seat of Zhalantun, Inner Mongolia, China. As of 2011, it has five residential communities (居委会) under its administration.

== See also ==
- List of township-level divisions of Inner Mongolia
