= Zalantun =

Zalantun 扎兰屯 • ᠵᠠᠯᠠᠨ ᠠᠢ᠌ᠯ • ᡷᠠ ᠯᠠᠨ ᡨᡠ᠋ᠨ (Chinese) • (Mongolian) • (Manchu) Cha-lan-t'un
- County-level city
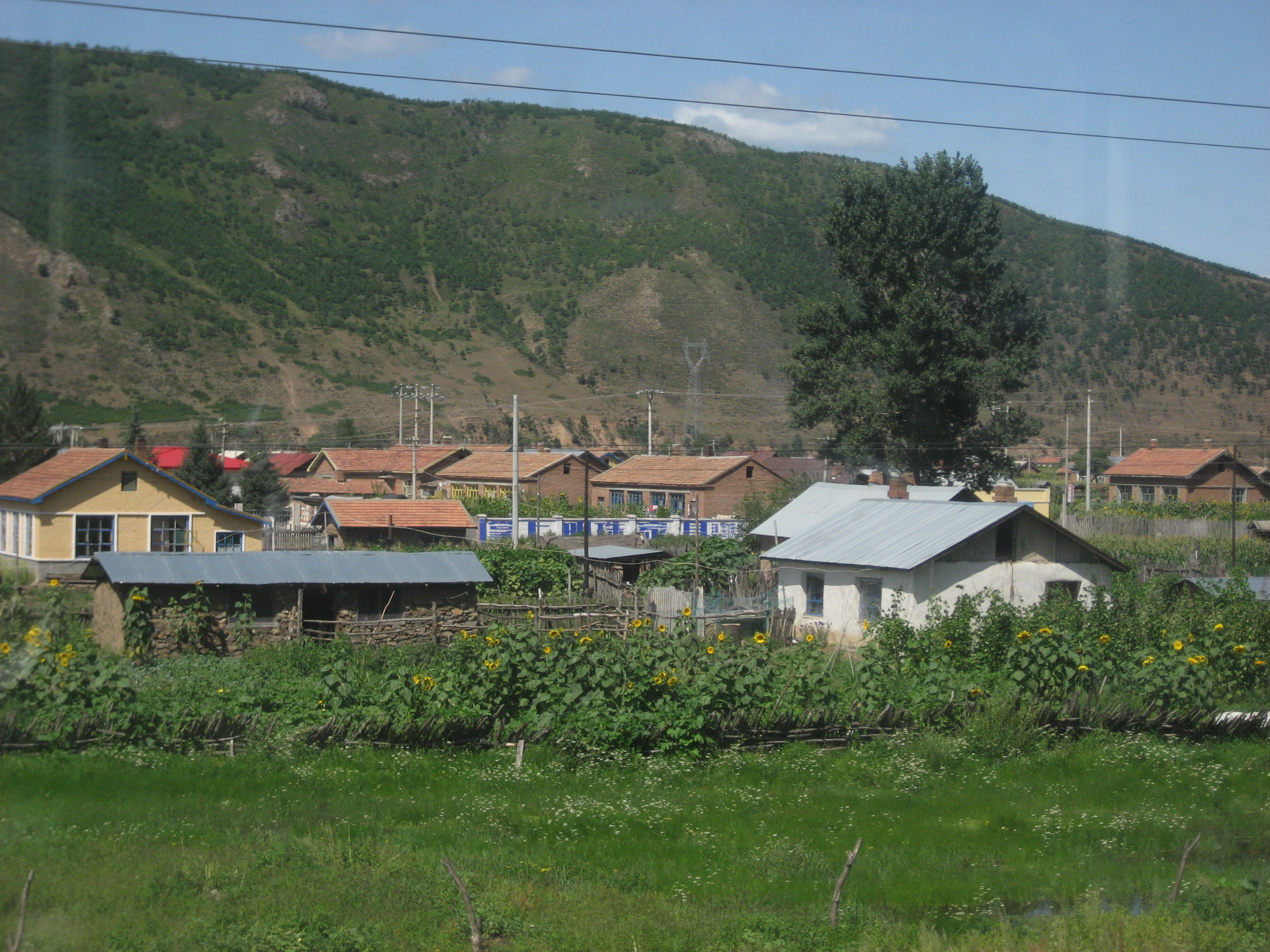
- Nickname: 塞北小江南 (Little Jiangnan of Saibei/Jiangnan beyond the Great Wall)
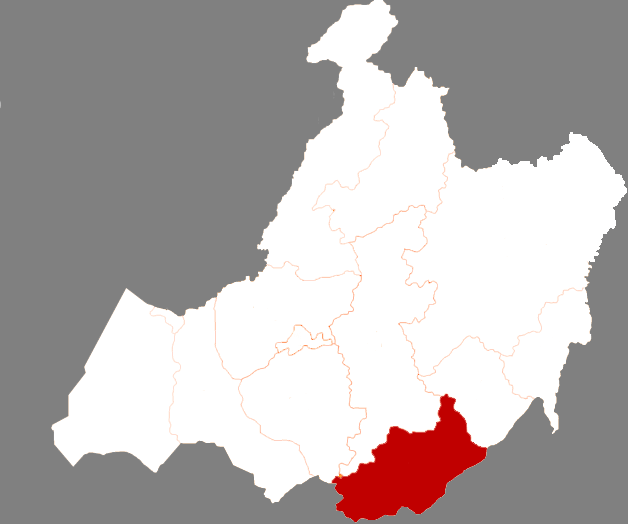
- Zalantun in Hulunbuir

- Location in Inner Mongolia Zalantun (China)
- Coordinates: 48°01′37″N 122°42′29″E
- Country: China
- Autonomous region: Inner Mongolia
- Prefecture-level city: Hulunbuir
- Municipal seat: Xinghua Subdistrict

Area
  - County-level city: 16,800.0 km^{2} (6,486.5 sq mi)
  - Urban: 385.00 km^{2} (148.65 sq mi)

Population (2020)
  - County-level city: 318,933
  - Density: 18.9841/km^{2} (49.1686/sq mi)
  - Urban: 134,400
- Time zone: UTC+8 (China Standard)
- Postal code: 162650
- Area code: 0470
- Website: www.zhalantun.gov.cn

Zalantun

Chinese name
- Traditional Chinese: 扎蘭屯
- Simplified Chinese: 扎兰屯
Transcriptions
Standard Mandarin
- Hanyu Pinyin: Zhālántún

Mongolian name
- Mongolian Cyrillic: Жалан-Айл хот
- Mongolian script: ᠵᠠᠯᠠᠨ ᠠᠢ᠌ᠯ ᠬᠣᠲᠠ
Transcriptions
- SASM/GNC: Jalan Ayil qota

Manchu name
- Manchu script: ᡷᠠ ᠯᠠᠨ ᡨᡠ᠋ᠨ ᡥᠣᡨᠣᠨ
- Möllendorff: ja lan tu'n hoton

Zalantun (Manchu ᠵᠠ
ᠯᠠᠨ
ᠠᡳ᠌ᠯ; J̌alan Ai"l) or ᠵᠠ
ᠯᠠᠨ
ᡨᡠ᠋ᠨ; Jalan Tun or Zhalantun) (simplified Chinese: 扎兰屯; traditional Chinese: 札蘭屯; pinyin: Zā lán tún) (Mongolian: ᠵᠠᠯᠠᠨ
ᠠᠢ᠌ᠯ ; Жалан-Айл), is a city and administrative division of Hulunbuir Prefecture-level city, Inner Mongolia, China. It is in the northeastern part of Inner Mongolia, in the southeastern foothills of the Greater Khingan mountains, bordering Heilongjiang province to the east. It is an area which has a number of forests and streams, as well as the Yalu River, not to be confused with the Yalu River on the Sino-Korean border. It is known for its hunting and fishing.

== History ==
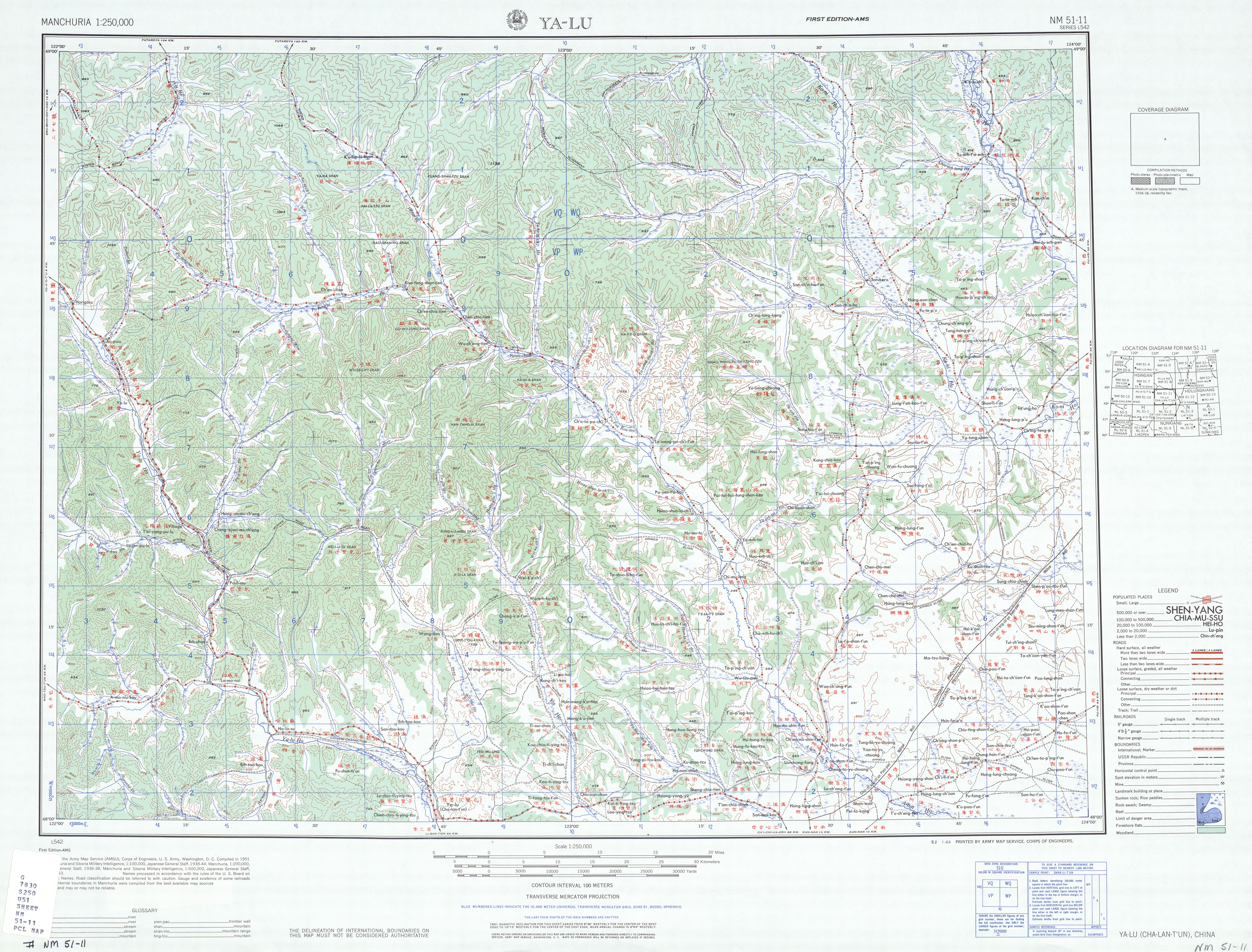
Map including Zalantun (labeled as 雅魯(扎蘭屯) Ya-lu (Cha-lan-t'un) (AMS, 1951)

Zalantun was formerly known as Butha (Chinese: 布特哈; pinyin: Bùtèhā) (Manchu: ᠪᡠᡨᡥᠠᡳ; Buthai), and the city was made into an administrative centre in the Kangxi era. In 1929, Buteha was renamed as Yalu county (雅鲁县; Yǎlǔ Xiàn) because the Yalu River runs through it, but in 1933 it became the Zalantun Banner (扎兰屯旗; Zhālántún Qí). In 1983, Zalantun ceased to be a banner and became a part of Hulunbuir, remaining so today.

== Administrative divisions ==
Zalantun is made up of 7 subdistricts, 8 towns, 1 township, and 3 ethnic townships.

Name	Simplified Chinese	Hanyu Pinyin	Mongolian (Hudum Script)	Mongolian (Cyrillic)	Administrative division code
Subdistricts
Xinghua Subdistrict	兴华街道	Xīnghuá Jiēdào	ᠰᠢᠩ ᠬᠤᠸᠠ ᠵᠡᠭᠡᠯᠢ ᠭᠤᠳᠤᠮᠵᠢ	Шин ухаа зээл гудамж	150783001
Zhengyang Subdistrict	正阳街道	Zhèngyáng Jiēdào	ᠵᠧᠩ ᠶᠠᠩ ᠵᠡᠭᠡᠯᠢ ᠭᠤᠳᠤᠮᠵᠢ	Жен ян зээл гудамж	150783002
Fanrong Subdistrict	繁荣街道	Fánróng Jiēdào	ᠹᠠᠨ ᠷᠦᠩ ᠵᠡᠭᠡᠯᠢ ᠭᠤᠳᠤᠮᠵᠢ	Фан рун зээл гудамж	150783003
Xiangyang Subdistrict	向阳街道	Xiàngyáng Jiēdào	ᠰᠢᠶᠠᠩ ᠶᠠᠩ ᠵᠡᠭᠡᠯᠢ ᠭᠤᠳᠤᠮᠵᠢ	Шиян ян зээл гудамж	150783004
Gaotaizi Subdistrict	高台子街道	Gāotáizi Jiēdào	ᠭᠣᠤ ᠲᠠᠢ ᠽᠢ ᠵᠡᠭᠡᠯᠢ ᠭᠤᠳᠤᠮᠵᠢ	Гуутай зи зээл гудамж	150783005
Tiedong Subdistrict	铁东街道	Tiědōng Jiēdào	ᠲᠡᠮᠦᠷ ᠵᠠᠮ ᠤᠨ ᠵᠡᠭᠦᠨᠳ᠋ᠠᠬᠢ ᠵᠡᠭᠡᠯᠢ ᠭᠤᠳᠤᠮᠵᠢ	Дамар замын зүүндэх зээл гудамж	150783006
Hexi Subdistrict	河西街道	Héxī Jiēdào	ᠭᠣᠣᠯ ᠤᠨ ᠪᠠᠷᠠᠭᠤᠨᠳᠠᠬᠢ ᠵᠡᠭᠡᠯᠢ ᠭᠤᠳᠤᠮᠵᠢ	Голын баруунтах зээл гудамж	150783007
Towns
Moguqi Town	蘑菇气镇	Mógūqì Zhèn	ᠮᠦᠬᠦᠴᠢ ᠪᠠᠯᠭᠠᠰᠤ	Мөөч балгас	150783100
Woniuhe Town	卧牛河镇	Wòniúhé Zhèn	ᠸᠧ ᠨᠢᠦ ᠾᠧ ᠪᠠᠯᠭᠠᠰᠤ	Ве нүү ге балгас	150783102
Genghis Khan Town	成吉思汗镇	Chéngjísīhán Zhèn	ᠴᠢᠩᠭᠢᠰ ᠬᠠᠨ ᠪᠠᠯᠭᠠᠰᠤ	Чингис хан балгас	150783103
Dahewan Town	大河湾镇	Dàhéwān Zhèn	ᠳ᠋ᠠ ᠾᠧ ᠸᠠᠨ ᠪᠠᠯᠭᠠᠰᠤ	Да ге ван балгас	150783104
Haoraoshan Town	浩饶山镇	Hàoráoshān Zhèn	ᠬᠣᠷᠣᠭ᠎ᠠ ᠠᠭᠤᠯᠠ ᠪᠠᠯᠭᠠᠰᠤ	Хороо уул балгас	150783105
Chaihe Town	柴河镇	Cháihé Zhèn	ᠴᠠᠢ ᠾᠧ ᠪᠠᠯᠭᠠᠰᠤ	Цай ге балгас	150783106
Zhonghe Town	中和镇	Zhōnghé Zhèn	ᠵᠦᠩ ᠾᠧ ᠪᠠᠯᠭᠠᠰᠤ	Жүн ге балгас	150783107
Haduohe Town (Had Gol Town)	哈多河镇	Hāduōhé Zhèn	ᠬᠠᠳᠤ ᠭᠣᠣᠯ ᠪᠠᠯᠭᠠᠰᠤ	Хад гол балгас	150783108
Township
Wadi Township	洼堤乡	Wādī Xiāng	ᠸᠠᠲ᠋ᠢ ᠰᠢᠶᠠᠩ	Вади шиян	150783203
Ethnic townships
Daur Ethnic Township	达斡尔民族乡	Dáwò'ěr Mínzúxiāng	ᠳᠠᠭᠤᠷ ᠦᠨᠳᠦᠰᠦᠲᠡᠨ ᠦ ᠰᠢᠶᠠᠩ	Дагуур үндэстэний шиян	150783200
Oroqen Ethnic Township	鄂伦春民族乡	Èlúnchūn Mínzúxiāng	ᠣᠷᠴᠣᠨ ᠦᠨᠳᠦᠰᠦᠲᠡᠨ ᠦ ᠰᠢᠶᠠᠩ	Орцон үндэстэний шиян	150783201
Samagir Evenk Ethnic Township	萨马街鄂温克民族乡	Sàmǎjiē Èwēnkè Mínzúxiāng	ᠰᠠ ᠮᠠ ᠵᠢᠶᠧ ᠡᠸᠡᠩᠬᠢ ᠦᠨᠳᠦᠰᠦᠲᠡᠨ ᠦ ᠰᠢᠶᠠᠩ	Саа ма жье эвэнк үндэстэний шиян	150783202

== Climate ==
Zalantun has a monsoon-influenced humid continental climate (Köppen Dwa/Dwb), with long frigid winters, very warm summers, and short transitional seasons. The monthly mean temperature ranges from −16.5 °C (2.3 °F) in January to 21.7 °C (71.1 °F) in July, while the annual mean is 3.65 °C (38.6 °F). Typifying the influence of the East Asian Monsoon, on average, a majority of the annual 501 millimetres (19.7 in) of precipitation falls in July and August alone.

Climate data for Zhalantun, elevation 307 m (1,007 ft), (1991–2020 normals, extremes 1971–2010)
Month	Jan	Feb	Mar	Apr	May	Jun	Jul	Aug	Sep	Oct	Nov	Dec	Year
Record high °C (°F)	4.3 (39.7)	11.7 (53.1)	22.1 (71.8)	30.7 (87.3)	38.0 (100.4)	40.2 (104.4)	40.1 (104.2)	35.2 (95.4)	35.5 (95.9)	29.7 (85.5)	17.0 (62.6)	5.9 (42.6)	40.2 (104.4)
Mean daily maximum °C (°F)	−10.6 (12.9)	−5.3 (22.5)	2.9 (37.2)	13.1 (55.6)	21.2 (70.2)	26.1 (79.0)	27.9 (82.2)	25.9 (78.6)	20.4 (68.7)	11.2 (52.2)	−1.3 (29.7)	−10.0 (14.0)	10.1 (50.2)
Daily mean °C (°F)	−16.3 (2.7)	−11.9 (10.6)	−3.7 (25.3)	6.3 (43.3)	14.3 (57.7)	19.8 (67.6)	22.3 (72.1)	20.0 (68.0)	13.4 (56.1)	4.4 (39.9)	−7.1 (19.2)	−15.2 (4.6)	3.9 (38.9)
Mean daily minimum °C (°F)	−20.6 (−5.1)	−17.0 (1.4)	−9.4 (15.1)	−0.3 (31.5)	7.5 (45.5)	14.1 (57.4)	17.5 (63.5)	15.4 (59.7)	7.9 (46.2)	−1.2 (29.8)	−11.8 (10.8)	−19.4 (−2.9)	−1.4 (29.4)
Record low °C (°F)	−34.7 (−30.5)	−34.5 (−30.1)	−26.7 (−16.1)	−14.2 (6.4)	−6.3 (20.7)	2.8 (37.0)	8.0 (46.4)	1.6 (34.9)	−5.7 (21.7)	−15.9 (3.4)	−25.3 (−13.5)	−34.5 (−30.1)	−34.7 (−30.5)
Average precipitation mm (inches)	1.7 (0.07)	2.9 (0.11)	5.7 (0.22)	22.5 (0.89)	40.3 (1.59)	100.9 (3.97)	152.9 (6.02)	132.0 (5.20)	48.0 (1.89)	18.5 (0.73)	5.7 (0.22)	5.2 (0.20)	536.3 (21.11)
Average precipitation days (≥ 0.1 mm)	3.1	2.5	3.8	5.8	9.0	13.8	15.1	12.9	8.9	4.7	3.4	5.2	88.2
Average snowy days	5.8	4.4	5.8	3.9	0.3	0	0	0	0.1	2.6	5.5	7.9	36.3
Average relative humidity (%)	56	50	42	39	43	60	69	71	62	52	55	60	55
Mean monthly sunshine hours	188.2	216.8	269.8	264.2	275.3	247.3	239.1	239.9	239.7	228.0	176.2	158.4	2,742.9
Percentage possible sunshine	68	74	73	64	58	52	50	55	64	69	64	61	63
Source: China Meteorological Administration Weather China

== Economy ==
Zalantun's economy is based primarily on tourism and agriculture, livestock and forestry. The Harbin-Manzhouli Railway traverses the district. It is rich in food grains, particularly wheat, soy and corn, as well as cattle, sheep, horse and other livestock. It has an industrial base in paper production, candy production, and wool. It has an annual average temperature of 2 °C and an average annual precipitation of 480mm. The northwest portion of the district consists of natural forests in the Greater Khingan mountains.

== Transport ==
Zhalantun Chengjisihan Airport was opened in December 2016.
