= Xinbarag Youqi Baogede Airport =

Airport in Hulunbuir, Inner Mongolia, China

Xinbarag Youqi Baogede Airport 新巴尔虎右旗宝格德机场
- IATA: XRQ; ICAO: none

Summary
- Airport type: Public
- Serves: New Barag Right Banner, Inner Mongolia, China
- Opened: 26 December 2017
- Coordinates: 48.57615°N 116.93779°E

Map
- Location of the airport XRQ (China)

Runways
| Direction | Length | | Surface |
| Direction | m | ft | Surface |
|---|---|---|---|
| | 1,200 | 3,937 |

Xinbarag Youqi (New Barag Right Banner) Baogede Airport (Chinese: 新巴尔虎右旗宝格德机场) (IATA: XRQ) is a general aviation airport serving New Barag Right Banner (Xinbarag Youqi) in Hulunbuir, Inner Mongolia, China. It is located northeast of the Baogede Wula Mountains, after which it is named. It is 13.5 kilometres (8.4 mi) from Alatan'emole Town, the seat of the banner, and 83 kilometres (52 mi) from the tri-border area of China, Mongolia, and Russia.

Construction for the airport began in 2013, and it was opened on 26 December 2017. It has a runway that is 1,200 metres (3,900 ft) long and 23 metres (75 ft) wide (class A1).
