= Yakeshi =

Yakeshi 牙克石市 ᠶᠠᠭᠰᠢ ᠬᠣᠲᠠ Ya-k'o-shih
- County-level city
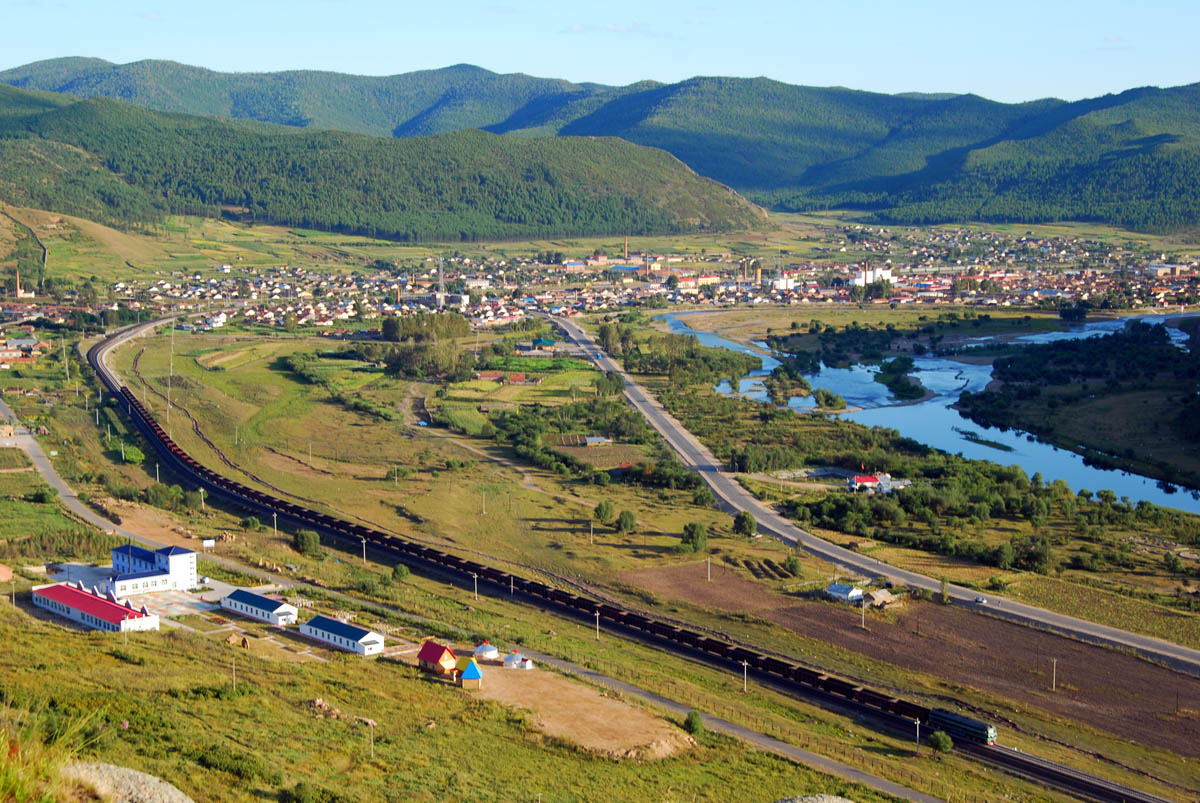

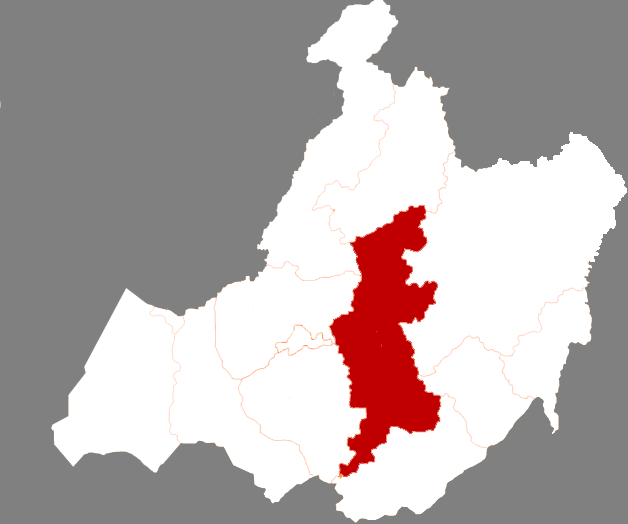
- Yakeshi in Hulunbuir

- Location of the city center in Inner Mongolia Yakeshi (China)
- Coordinates: 49°17′10″N 120°42′43″E
- Country: China
- Autonomous region: Inner Mongolia
- Prefecture-level city: Hulunbuir
- Municipal seat: Xingong Subdistrict

Area
  - County-level city: 27,590.0 km^{2} (10,652.6 sq mi)
  - Urban: 39.00 km^{2} (15.06 sq mi)
- Elevation: 657 m (2,156 ft)

Population (2020)
  - County-level city: 256,396
  - Density: 9.29308/km^{2} (24.0690/sq mi)
  - Urban: 132,100
- Time zone: UTC+8 (China Standard)
- Postal code: 022150
- Area code: 0470
- Website: www.yks.gov.cn

Yakeshi

Chinese name
- Chinese: 牙克石
Transcriptions
Standard Mandarin
- Hanyu Pinyin: Yákèshí

Mongolian name
- Mongolian Cyrillic: Ягши хот
- Mongolian script: ᠶᠠᠭᠰᠢ ᠬᠣᠲᠠ
Transcriptions
- SASM/GNC: Yagshi qota

Yakeshi (Mongolian: ᠶᠠᠭᠰᠢ ᠬᠣᠲᠠ; Chinese: 牙克石) is a county-level city of Hulunbuir, Inner Mongolia, China.

Yakeshi has a population of 391,627 and an area of 27,590 square kilometres (10,650 sq mi). It is situated next to the Hailar River 70 kilometres (43 mi) east of Hailar District, the seat of Hulunbuir, and on the north side of the Greater Khingan Range.

The city's economy is based on forestry industry, wood products, traditional Chinese medicines, gold, coal, iron, copper, wheat, rapeseed farming, sheep raising and dairy industries.

In 2008 several major players in the automobile industry established car testing facilities in Yakeshi. As part of the Electronic stability control (ESC)-development for new cars, special prototype cars are tested under winter conditions on frozen lakes and special snow-tracks. The first such test facilities were set up in the city by the German automobile supplier Robert Bosch GmbH whose development center for the Chinese car market is in Suzhou in Eastern China.

The city is connected by rail to Harbin and Hailar, and the nearest airport is in Hailar.

The original name for the city, Xuguit Banner, came from the Mongolian word for the area. Its name was changed to Yakeshi in 1983 when it was designated a county-level city.

== Administrative divisions ==
Yakeshi is made up of 6 subdistricts and 10 towns.

Name	Simplified Chinese	Hanyu Pinyin	Mongolian (Hudum Script)	Mongolian (Cyrillic)	Administrative division code
Subdistricts
Shengli Subdistrict	胜利街道	Shènglì Jiēdào	ᠱᠧᠩ ᠯᠢ ᠵᠡᠭᠡᠯᠢ ᠭᠤᠳᠤᠮᠵᠢ	Шен ли зээл гудамж	150782001
Hongqi Subdistrict	红旗街道	Hóngqí Jiēdào	ᠤᠯᠠᠭᠠᠨ ᠲᠤᠭ ᠵᠡᠭᠡᠯᠢ ᠭᠤᠳᠤᠮᠵᠢ	Улаан дог зээл гудамж	150782002
Xingong Subdistrict	新工街道	Xīngōng Jiēdào	ᠰᠢᠨ ᠭᠦᠩ ᠵᠡᠭᠡᠯᠢ ᠭᠤᠳᠤᠮᠵᠢ	Шин хүн зээл гудамж	150782003
Yongxing Subdistrict	永兴街道	Yǒngxīng Jiēdào	ᠶᠦᠩ ᠰᠢᠩ ᠵᠡᠭᠡᠯᠢ ᠭᠤᠳᠤᠮᠵᠢ	Юн шин зээл гудамж	150782004
Jianshe Subdistrict	建设街道	Jiànshè Jiēdào	ᠵᠢᠶᠠᠨ ᠱᠧ ᠵᠡᠭᠡᠯᠢ ᠭᠤᠳᠤᠮᠵᠢ	Жаан ше зээл гудамж	150782005
Nuanquan Subdistrict	暖泉街道	Nuǎnquán Jiēdào	ᠨᠤᠸᠠᠨ ᠴᠢᠦᠸᠠᠨ ᠵᠡᠭᠡᠯᠢ ᠭᠤᠳᠤᠮᠵᠢ	Нюан чиован зээл гудамж	150782006
Towns
Mianduhe Town	免渡河镇	Miǎndùhé Zhèn	ᠮᠢᠶᠠᠨ ᠳ᠋ᠦ᠋ ᠾᠧ ᠪᠠᠯᠭᠠᠰᠤ	Монд ге балгас	150782100
Bogt Town	博克图镇	Bókètú Zhèn	ᠪᠣᠭᠤᠲᠤ ᠪᠠᠯᠭᠠᠰᠤ	Боод балгас	150782101
Chaoheyuan Town	绰河源镇	Chāohéyuán Zhèn	ᠴᠣᠤ ᠾᠧ ᠶᠤᠸᠠᠨ ᠪᠠᠯᠭᠠᠰᠤ	Цуу ге юан балгас	150782102
Urqihan Town	乌尔其汉镇	Wū'ěrqíhàn Zhèn	ᠦᠷᠴᠢᠬᠠᠨ ᠪᠠᠯᠭᠠᠰᠤ	Үрчхан балгас	150782103
Huder Town	库都尔镇	Kùdū'ěr Zhèn	ᠬᠦᠳᠦᠷ ᠪᠠᠯᠭᠠᠰᠤ	Хөдөр балгас	150782104
Toli Gol Town	图里河镇	Túlǐhé Zhèn	ᠲᠣᠣᠯᠢ ᠭᠣᠣᠯ ᠪᠠᠯᠭᠠᠰᠤ	Дооли гол балгас	150782105
Unir Town	乌奴耳镇	Wūnú'ěr Zhèn	ᠦᠨᠢᠷ ᠪᠠᠯᠭᠠᠰᠤ	Өнөр балгас	150782106
Tarqi Town	塔尔气镇	Tǎ'ěrqì Zhèn	ᠲᠠᠷᠴᠢ ᠪᠠᠯᠭᠠᠰᠤ	Тарч балгас	150782107
Ih Toli Gol Town	伊图里河镇	Yītúlǐhé Zhèn	ᠶᠡᠬᠡ ᠲᠣᠣᠯᠢ ᠭᠣᠣᠯ ᠪᠠᠯᠭᠠᠰᠤ	Их дооли гол балгас	150782108
Muyuan Town	牧原镇	Mùyuán Zhèn	ᠮᠤ ᠶᠤᠸᠠᠨ ᠪᠠᠯᠭᠠᠰᠤ	Мү юан балгас	150782109

Others:

- Mugai Farm (莫拐农场)
- Yakeshi Farm (牙克石农场)
- Mianduhe Farm (免渡河农场)

== Climate ==
Climate data for Yakeshi, elevation 669 m (2,195 ft), (1991–2020 normals, extremes 1981–2010)
Month	Jan	Feb	Mar	Apr	May	Jun	Jul	Aug	Sep	Oct	Nov	Dec	Year
Record high °C (°F)	−2.2 (28.0)	4.3 (39.7)	15.7 (60.3)	28.4 (83.1)	34.2 (93.6)	37.0 (98.6)	37.4 (99.3)	34.6 (94.3)	32.6 (90.7)	26.5 (79.7)	13.0 (55.4)	0.6 (33.1)	37.4 (99.3)
Mean daily maximum °C (°F)	−20.6 (−5.1)	−14.4 (6.1)	−3.8 (25.2)	9.2 (48.6)	18.5 (65.3)	24.0 (75.2)	26.0 (78.8)	24.0 (75.2)	17.8 (64.0)	7.5 (45.5)	−6.8 (19.8)	−17.9 (−0.2)	5.3 (41.5)
Daily mean °C (°F)	−26.5 (−15.7)	−21.9 (−7.4)	−10.9 (12.4)	2.4 (36.3)	11.1 (52.0)	17.0 (62.6)	19.7 (67.5)	17.4 (63.3)	10.1 (50.2)	0.4 (32.7)	−12.8 (9.0)	−23.2 (−9.8)	−1.4 (29.4)
Mean daily minimum °C (°F)	−31.6 (−24.9)	−28.4 (−19.1)	−17.7 (0.1)	−4.0 (24.8)	3.3 (37.9)	9.8 (49.6)	13.7 (56.7)	11.5 (52.7)	3.6 (38.5)	−5.4 (22.3)	−18.1 (−0.6)	−28.2 (−18.8)	−7.6 (18.3)
Record low °C (°F)	−45.0 (−49.0)	−45.4 (−49.7)	−38.5 (−37.3)	−19.9 (−3.8)	−10.6 (12.9)	−4.4 (24.1)	2.4 (36.3)	−1.3 (29.7)	−10.0 (14.0)	−20.6 (−5.1)	−38.1 (−36.6)	−43.5 (−46.3)	−45.4 (−49.7)
Average precipitation mm (inches)	4.7 (0.19)	5.1 (0.20)	8.5 (0.33)	14.2 (0.56)	29.6 (1.17)	72.7 (2.86)	88.5 (3.48)	90.4 (3.56)	46.9 (1.85)	21.5 (0.85)	8.9 (0.35)	8.4 (0.33)	399.4 (15.73)
Average precipitation days (≥ 0.1 mm)	9.6	6.5	6.4	6.4	8.7	12.8	14.8	13.5	10.3	7.2	8.6	11.6	116.4
Average snowy days	13.3	10.1	9.3	7.2	1.5	0.1	0	0	1.0	6.3	11.9	15.8	76.5
Average relative humidity (%)	73	73	68	54	49	64	72	74	68	65	72	76	67
Mean monthly sunshine hours	144.5	192.3	254.7	245.2	263.9	258.6	251.3	240.3	210.4	197.7	153.1	118.6	2,530.6
Percentage possible sunshine	53	67	69	59	55	53	52	55	57	60	57	47	57
Source: China Meteorological Administration

Climate data for Boketu Town, Yakeshi, elevation 740 m (2,430 ft), (1991–2020 normals, extremes 1951–present)
Month	Jan	Feb	Mar	Apr	May	Jun	Jul	Aug	Sep	Oct	Nov	Dec	Year
Record high °C (°F)	−0.1 (31.8)	10.9 (51.6)	20.0 (68.0)	28.6 (83.5)	34.7 (94.5)	36.8 (98.2)	36.8 (98.2)	35.2 (95.4)	32.1 (89.8)	27.2 (81.0)	12.3 (54.1)	3.4 (38.1)	36.8 (98.2)
Mean daily maximum °C (°F)	−14.9 (5.2)	−9.6 (14.7)	−1.5 (29.3)	9.2 (48.6)	17.9 (64.2)	22.8 (73.0)	24.9 (76.8)	22.9 (73.2)	17.2 (63.0)	7.6 (45.7)	−5.0 (23.0)	−13.6 (7.5)	6.5 (43.7)
Daily mean °C (°F)	−20.1 (−4.2)	−16.0 (3.2)	−8.0 (17.6)	2.5 (36.5)	10.6 (51.1)	15.9 (60.6)	18.7 (65.7)	16.4 (61.5)	9.7 (49.5)	0.8 (33.4)	−10.6 (12.9)	−18.3 (−0.9)	0.1 (32.2)
Mean daily minimum °C (°F)	−23.9 (−11.0)	−21.0 (−5.8)	−14.0 (6.8)	−4.2 (24.4)	2.7 (36.9)	8.6 (47.5)	12.7 (54.9)	10.6 (51.1)	3.3 (37.9)	−4.9 (23.2)	−15.2 (4.6)	−22.1 (−7.8)	−5.6 (21.9)
Record low °C (°F)	−37.5 (−35.5)	−37.4 (−35.3)	−30 (−22)	−21.3 (−6.3)	−10.5 (13.1)	−3.4 (25.9)	−0.1 (31.8)	−1.6 (29.1)	−11.5 (11.3)	−24.2 (−11.6)	−30.1 (−22.2)	−36.7 (−34.1)	−37.5 (−35.5)
Average precipitation mm (inches)	2.0 (0.08)	2.7 (0.11)	6.6 (0.26)	16.3 (0.64)	34.2 (1.35)	97.2 (3.83)	130.4 (5.13)	107.3 (4.22)	55.5 (2.19)	17.7 (0.70)	6.5 (0.26)	5.1 (0.20)	481.5 (18.97)
Average precipitation days (≥ 0.1 mm)	4.0	3.3	5.5	7.6	10.1	15.5	16.7	15.2	10.6	6.3	6.0	6.6	107.4
Average snowy days	9.8	7.7	9.9	8.3	2.0	0.1	0	0	0.9	7.0	11.6	13.0	70.3
Average relative humidity (%)	65	62	55	47	48	68	76	78	68	59	65	67	63
Mean monthly sunshine hours	203.4	224.5	275.7	263.3	271.7	257.0	251.4	243.3	232.0	217.1	183.5	175.0	2,797.9
Percentage possible sunshine	75	77	74	64	57	53	52	56	62	66	68	68	64
Source: China Meteorological Administrationextremes

== Transport ==
Yakeshi is located on the Harbin-Manzhouli Railway.

== Gallery ==
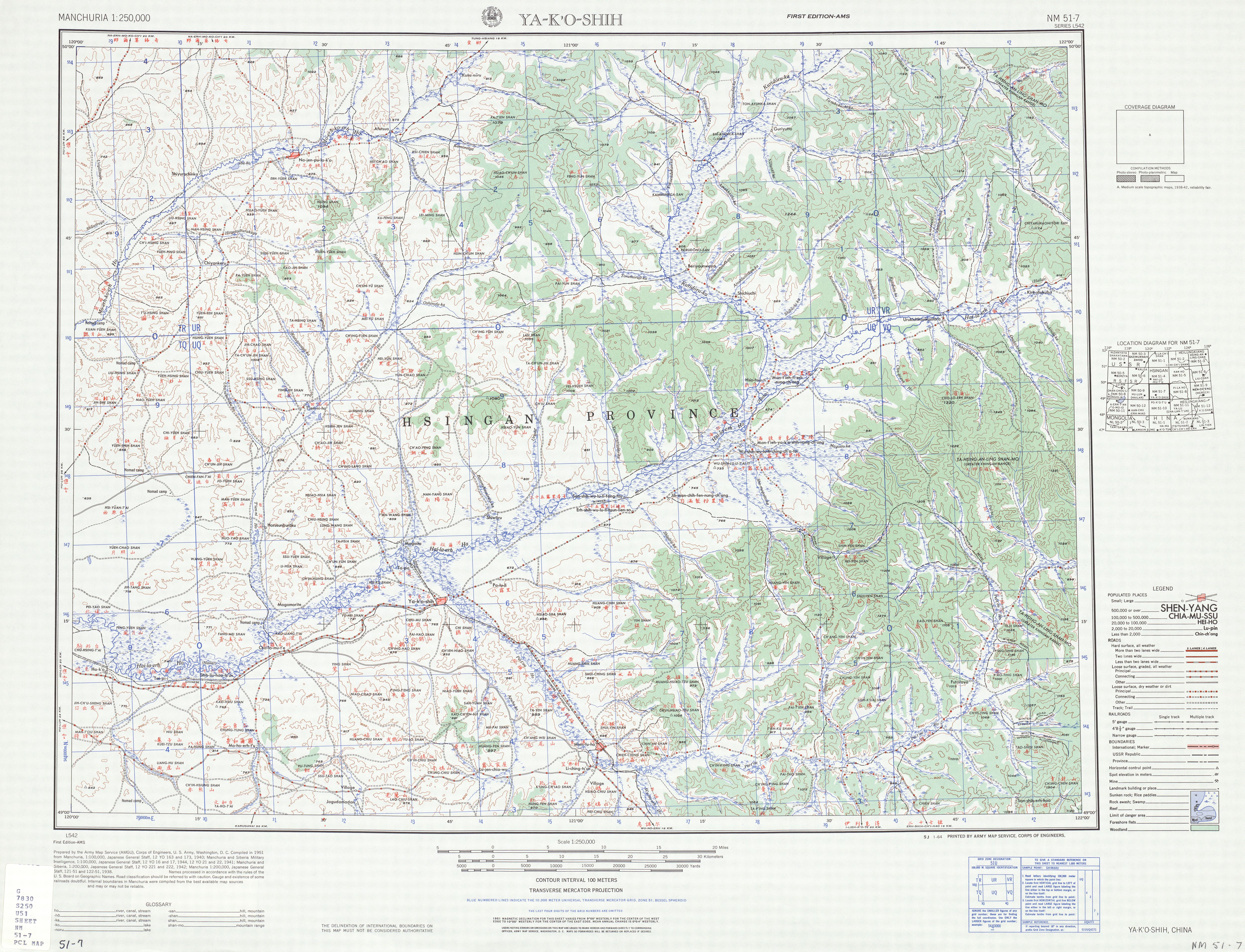
Map including Yakeshi (labeled as 牙克石 Ya-k'o-shih) (AMS, 1951)

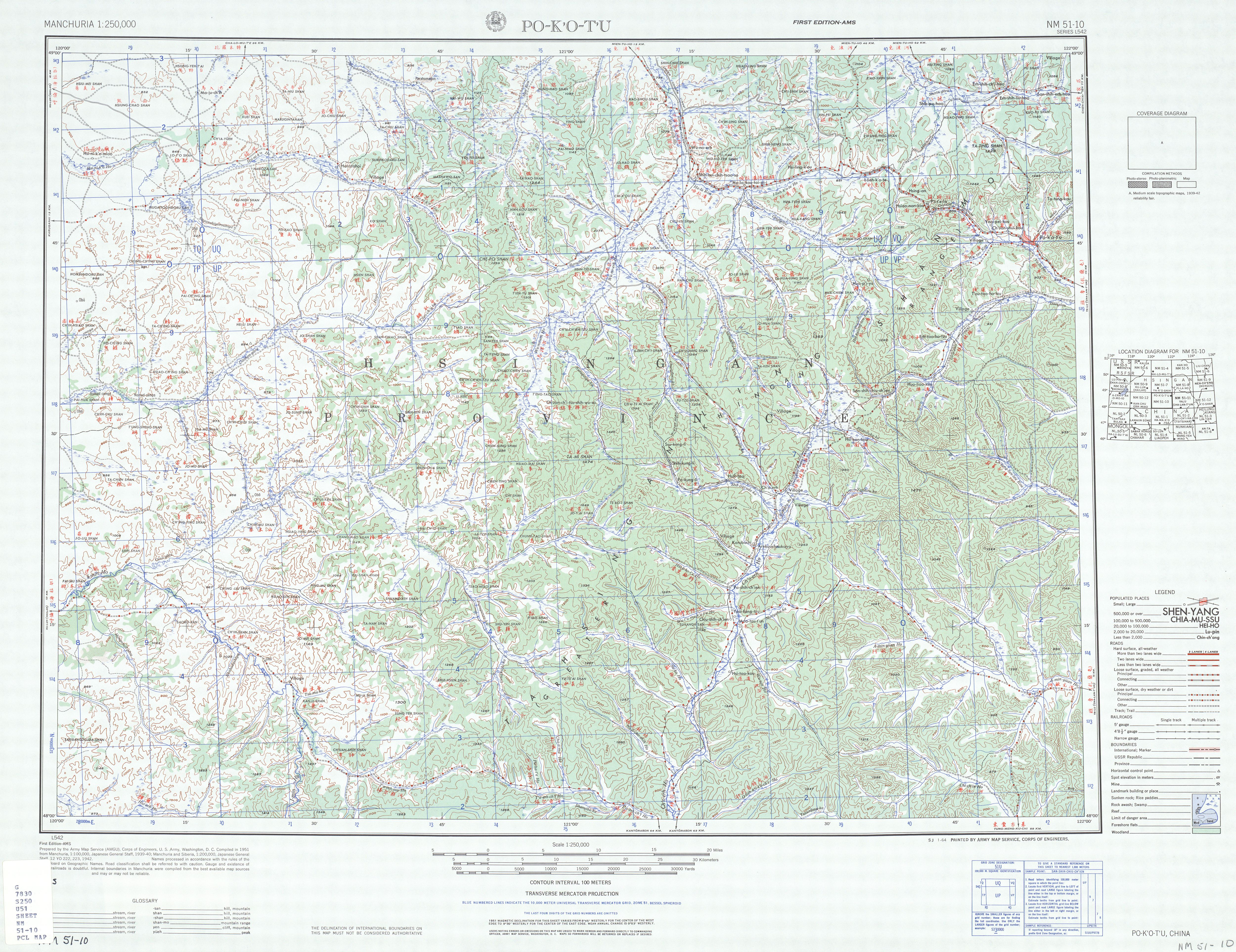
Map including part of Yagshi qot (AMS, 1951)
