= New Barag Right Banner =

New Barag Right Banner 新巴尔虎右旗 • ᠰᠢᠨ᠎ᠡ ᠪᠠᠷᠭᠤ ᠪᠠᠷᠠᠭᠤᠨ ᠬᠣᠰᠢᠭᠤ Xin Barag Youqi
- Banner
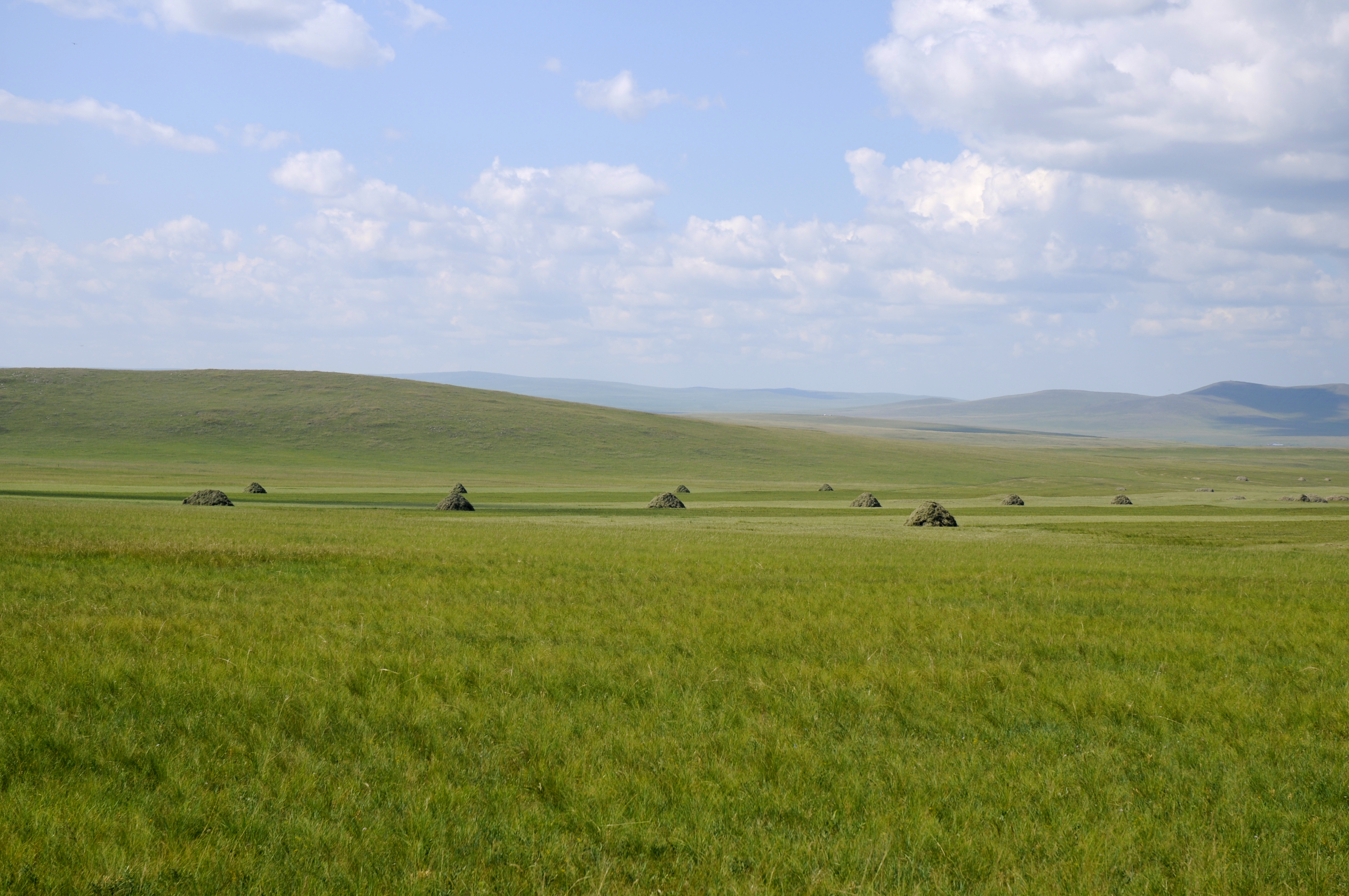

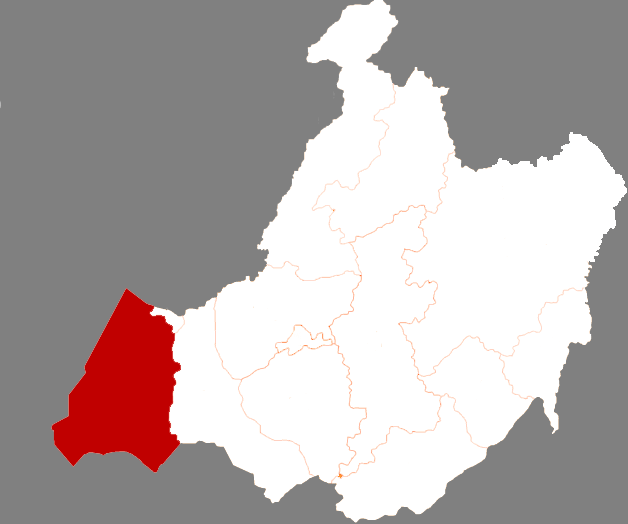
- Location of New Barag Right Banner within Hulunbuir

- Location in Inner Mongolia New Barag Right Banner (China)
- Coordinates: 48°40′N 116°49′E
- Country: China
- Autonomous region: Inner Mongolia
- Prefecture-level city: Hulunbuir
- Banner seat: Altan Emel

Area
  - Total: 24,839.47 km^{2} (9,590.57 sq mi)
- Elevation: 559 m (1,834 ft)

Population (2020)
  - Total: 38,358
  - Density: 1.5442/km^{2} (3.9996/sq mi)
- Time zone: UTC+8 (China Standard)
- Website: www.xbehyq.gov.cn

New Barag Right Banner

Chinese name
- Simplified Chinese: 新巴尔虎右旗
- Traditional Chinese: 新巴爾虎右旗
Transcriptions
Standard Mandarin
- Hanyu Pinyin: Xīn Bā'ěrhǔ Yòu Qí

Mongolian name
- Mongolian Cyrillic: Шинэ Барга баруун хошуу
- Mongolian script: ᠰᠢᠨ᠎ᠡ ᠪᠠᠷᠭᠤ ᠪᠠᠷᠠᠭᠤᠨ ᠬᠣᠰᠢᠭᠤ
Transcriptions
- SASM/GNC: Sin-e Barɣu Baraɣun qosiɣu

New Barag Right Banner (Mongolian: ᠰᠢᠨ᠎ᠡ ᠪᠠᠷᠭᠤ ᠪᠠᠷᠠᠭᠤᠨ ᠬᠣᠰᠢᠭᠤ; Chinese: 新巴尔虎右旗), also romanized as Xin Barag Youqi, is a banner of northern Inner Mongolia, China, bordering Mongolia in all directions but the east. It is also located not too far from the shores of Hulun Lake, and is under the administration of Hulunbuir City.

The banner is served by Xinbarag Youqi Baogede Airport, opened in December 2017.

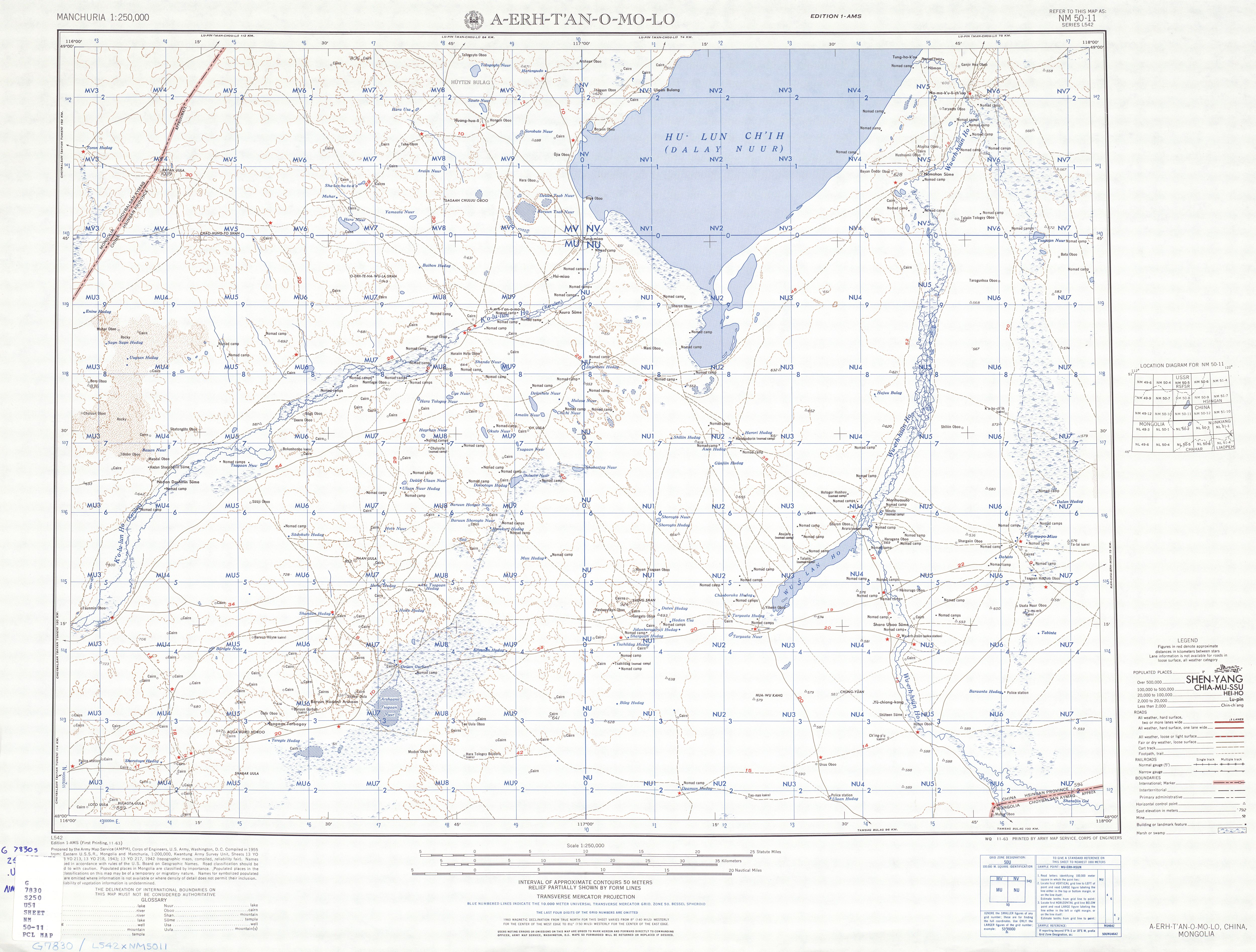
A-erh-t'an-o-mo-lo (1955)

== Administrative divisions ==
New Barag Right Banner is made up of 3 towns and 4 sums.

| Name | Simplified Chinese | Hanyu Pinyin | Mongolian (Hudum Script) | Mongolian (Cyrillic) | Administrative division code |
|---|---|---|---|---|---|
Towns
| Altan Emel Town | 阿拉坦额莫勒镇 | Ālātǎn'émòlè Zhèn | ᠠᠯᠲᠠᠨ᠌ᠡᠮᠡᠭᠡᠯ ᠪᠠᠯᠭᠠᠰᠤ | Алтан-Эмээл балгас | 150727100 |
| Ar Haxat Town | 阿日哈沙特镇 | Ārìhāshātè Zhèn | ᠠᠷᠤᠬᠠᠰᠢᠶᠠᠲᠤ ᠪᠠᠯᠭᠠᠰᠤ | Архашаат балгас | 150727101 |
| Hulun Town | 呼伦镇 | Hūlún Zhèn | ᠬᠥᠯᠥᠨ ᠪᠠᠯᠭᠠᠰᠤ | Гүүлэн балгас | 150727102 |
Sums
| Buir Sum | 贝尔苏木 | Bèi'ěr Sūmù | ᠪᠤᠢᠷ ᠰᠤᠮᠤ | Бойр сум | 150727200 |
| Herlen Sum | 克尔伦苏木 | Kè'ěrlún Sūmù | ᠬᠡᠷᠦᠯᠦᠨ ᠰᠤᠮᠤ | Хэрлүн сум | 150727201 |
| Dalai Sum | 达赉苏木 | Dálài Sūmù | ᠳᠠᠯᠠᠢ ᠰᠤᠮᠤ | Далай сум | 150727202 |
| Bogd Ul Sum | 宝格德乌拉苏木 | Bǎogédéwūlā Sūmù | ᠪᠣᠭᠳᠠᠠᠭᠤᠯᠠ ᠰᠤᠮᠤ | Богд-Уул сум | 150727203 |

== Climate ==
Climate data for New Barag Right Banner, elevation 542 m (1,778 ft), (1991–2020 normals, extremes 1981–2016)
| Month | Jan | Feb | Mar | Apr | May | Jun | Jul | Aug | Sep | Oct | Nov | Dec | Year |
|---|---|---|---|---|---|---|---|---|---|---|---|---|---|
| Record high °C (°F) | 2.9 (37.2) | 8.6 (47.5) | 20.5 (68.9) | 31.1 (88.0) | 35.9 (96.6) | 41.8 (107.2) | 44.1 (111.4) | 38.2 (100.8) | 35.2 (95.4) | 28.0 (82.4) | 13.9 (57.0) | 3.6 (38.5) | 44.1 (111.4) |
| Mean daily maximum °C (°F) | −15.6 (3.9) | −9.4 (15.1) | 0.1 (32.2) | 11.7 (53.1) | 20.4 (68.7) | 26.5 (79.7) | 28.5 (83.3) | 26.1 (79.0) | 19.6 (67.3) | 9.3 (48.7) | −3.5 (25.7) | −13.4 (7.9) | 8.4 (47.1) |
| Daily mean °C (°F) | −21.2 (−6.2) | −16.5 (2.3) | −7.0 (19.4) | 4.5 (40.1) | 13.3 (55.9) | 20.1 (68.2) | 22.6 (72.7) | 20.1 (68.2) | 12.6 (54.7) | 2.4 (36.3) | −9.7 (14.5) | −18.6 (−1.5) | 1.9 (35.4) |
| Mean daily minimum °C (°F) | −25.5 (−13.9) | −21.6 (−6.9) | −13.0 (8.6) | −2.4 (27.7) | 6.0 (42.8) | 13.3 (55.9) | 16.8 (62.2) | 14.3 (57.7) | 6.5 (43.7) | −3.0 (26.6) | −14.2 (6.4) | −22.7 (−8.9) | −3.8 (25.2) |
| Record low °C (°F) | −40.1 (−40.2) | −40.1 (−40.2) | −29.6 (−21.3) | −20.4 (−4.7) | −7.1 (19.2) | 0.8 (33.4) | 5.2 (41.4) | 3.6 (38.5) | −7.0 (19.4) | −18.5 (−1.3) | −30.0 (−22.0) | −35.4 (−31.7) | −40.1 (−40.2) |
| Average precipitation mm (inches) | 1.6 (0.06) | 1.5 (0.06) | 3.3 (0.13) | 6.1 (0.24) | 18.0 (0.71) | 33.2 (1.31) | 66.4 (2.61) | 60.5 (2.38) | 24.0 (0.94) | 8.2 (0.32) | 3.0 (0.12) | 2.7 (0.11) | 228.5 (8.99) |
| Average precipitation days (≥ 0.1 mm) | 3.2 | 2.3 | 2.6 | 3.3 | 5.4 | 9.2 | 12.0 | 10.2 | 7.0 | 4.0 | 3.3 | 4.4 | 66.9 |
| Average snowy days | 5.9 | 3.9 | 4.8 | 3.8 | 0.5 | 0 | 0 | 0 | 0.2 | 3.1 | 5.9 | 7.2 | 35.3 |
| Average relative humidity (%) | 72 | 68 | 57 | 41 | 39 | 49 | 59 | 62 | 56 | 55 | 66 | 72 | 58 |
| Mean monthly sunshine hours | 191.5 | 219.5 | 276.0 | 276.1 | 294.4 | 303.6 | 293.3 | 284.6 | 258.2 | 231.9 | 187.9 | 168.9 | 2,985.9 |
| Percentage possible sunshine | 70 | 75 | 74 | 67 | 62 | 63 | 61 | 65 | 70 | 71 | 69 | 66 | 68 |
Source: China Meteorological Administration all-time extreme temperature
