= Zhalantun Chengjisihan Airport =

Zhalantun Chengjisihan Airport 扎兰屯成吉思汗机场
- IATA: NZL; ICAO: ZBZL

Summary
- Airport type: Public
- Serves: Zhalantun, Inner Mongolia, China
- Location: Chengjisihan Town
- Coordinates: 47°51′57″N 122°46′3″E

Map
- Location of airport in Inner Mongolia

Runways
Direction	Length		Surface
Direction	m	ft	Surface
02/20	2,500	8,202	Concrete

Statistics (2021)
- Passengers: 152,450
- Aircraft movements: 54,972
- Cargo (metric tons): 35.6

Zhalantun Chengjisihan Airport
- Simplified Chinese: 扎兰屯成吉思汗机场
- Traditional Chinese: 札蘭屯成吉思汗機場
Transcriptions
Standard Mandarin
- Hanyu Pinyin: Zhālántún Chéngjísīhán Jīchǎng

Zhalantun Chengjisihan Airport (IATA: NZL, ICAO: ZBZL), also known as Jalan Genghis Khan Airport, is an airport serving the city of Zalantun in Hulunbuir, Inner Mongolia, China. It is located near the town of Chengjisihan, 14.2 kilometres (8.8 mi) from the city center. The airport opened in December 2016.

== History ==
Zhalantun airport received approval from the State Council of China and the Central Military Commission on 19 June 2013. Construction started on 16 July with a total investment of 438 million yuan. The airport opened on 28 December 2016 with the arrival of a China Express Airlines flight from Hohhot.

== Facilities ==
Zhalantun airport has a single runway with dimensions 2,500 by 45 metres (8,202 ft × 148 ft). The passenger terminal covers 8,400 square metres (90,000 sq ft) and can handle 280,000 people per year. The airport's annual cargo capacity is 1,400 tonnes (1,500 short tons).

== Airlines and destinations ==
Airlines	Destinations
Genghis Khan Airlines	Chifeng, Hailar, Hohhot
Hebei Airlines	Beijing–Daxing

== See also ==
- List of airports in China
- List of the busiest airports in China
