= Hulunbuir =

Prefecture-level city in Inner Mongolia, China

Hulunbuir 呼伦贝尔市
- Prefecture-level city

Name transcription(s)
  - Chinese: 呼伦贝尔市
  - Mongolian: ᠬᠥᠯᠥᠨ ᠪᠤᠶᠢᠷ ᠬᠣᠲᠠ
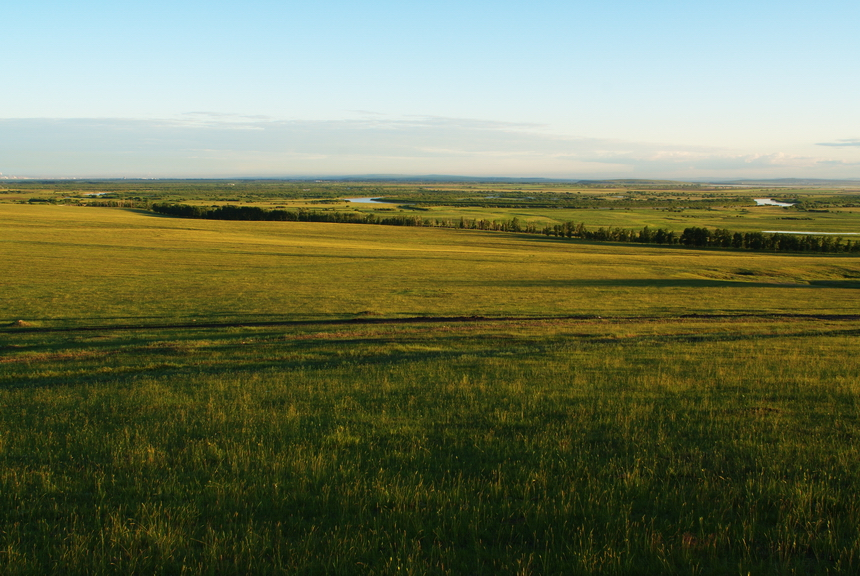
- Hulunbuir steppes

- Location of Hulunbuir City jurisdiction in Inner Mongolia

- Location of Hailar, the seat of the municipal government, in Inner Mongolia
- Coordinates (Hulunbuir municipal government): 49°12′26″N 119°46′16″E
- Country: People's Republic of China
- Region: Inner Mongolia
- Municipal seat: Hailar District

Area
  - Prefecture-level city: 263,953 km^{2} (101,913 sq mi)
  - Urban (2017): 252.00 km^{2} (97.30 sq mi)
  - Districts: 1,518.9 km^{2} (586.5 sq mi)

Population (2010)
  - Prefecture-level city: 2,549,278
  - Density: 9.65808/km^{2} (25.0143/sq mi)
  - Urban (2017): 349,400
  - Urban density: 1,387/km^{2} (3,591/sq mi)
  - Districts: 356,000
  - Major nationalities: Han: 81.85% Mongols: 8.6% Manchu: 4.13%

GDP
  - Prefecture-level city: CN¥ 159.6 billion US$ 25.6 billion
  - Per capita: CN¥ 63,133; US$ 10,136
- Time zone: UTC+8 (China Standard)
- Postal code: 021000
- Area code: 0470
- ISO 3166 code: CN-NM-07
- Website: www.hlbe.gov.cn

Hulunbuir

Chinese name
- Simplified Chinese: 呼伦贝尔
- Traditional Chinese: 呼倫貝爾
Transcriptions
Standard Mandarin
- Hanyu Pinyin: Hūlúnbèi'ěr
- IPA: [xú.lwə̌n.pêɪ.àɚ]

Mongolian name
- Mongolian Cyrillic: Хөлөнбуйр хот
- Mongolian script: ᠬᠥᠯᠥᠨ ᠪᠤᠶᠢᠷ ᠬᠣᠲᠠ
Transcriptions
- SASM/GNC: Kölön Buyir qota

Hulunbuir or Hulun Buir (Note: Mongolian: , Kölün buyir, Mongolian Cyrillic: Хөлөнбуйр, Khölönbuir; Chinese: 呼伦贝尔, Hūlúnbèi'ěr; Russian: Хулунбуир, Khulunbuir) is a prefecture-level city in northeastern Inner Mongolia, China. Its administrative center is located at Hailar District, its largest urban area. Major scenic features are the high steppes of the Hulun Buir grasslands, the Hulun and Buir lakes (the latter partially in Mongolia), and the Khingan range. Hulun Buir borders Russia to the north and west, Mongolia to the south and west, Heilongjiang province to the east and Hinggan League to the direct south. Hulunbuir is a linguistically diverse area: next to Mandarin Chinese, Mongolian dialects such as Khorchin and Buryat, the Mongolic language Daur, and some Tungusic languages, including Oroqen and Solon, are spoken there.

== History ==
During the Qing dynasty (1644–1912), Hulunbuir was part of Heilongjiang province. The 1858 Treaty of Aigun established today's approximate Sino-Russian border, at a great loss to Heilongjiang's territory. In 1901, the Chinese Eastern Railway linked Hulunbuir to the rest of northeast China and to Russian Far East. From 1912 to 1949, during the Republic of China (ROC) period, Hulunbuir was part of Xing'an and Heilongjiang provinces. In winter 1912, the Barga Mongol people of Hulunbuir expelled the Chinese troops and administration and proclaimed the independence of Barga (Hulunbuir); afterwards they declared allegiance to the Bogdo Khan of Mongolia; an agreement between the Russian Empire and the ROC on November 6/October 24, 1915 designated Hulunbuir a "special" region under direct subordination to the Central Government of China, but in practice Russia had partial control over day-to-day administration and economy. In 1929, the Soviet Union broke this agreement and invaded Hulunbuir. After the Japanese invasion of China, Hulunbuir became part of the Japanese puppet state Manchukuo, which was not recognized by the Chinese. In the Chinese Civil War, the Chinese Communist Party gained the support of Inner Mongol leaders like Ulanhu by promising the irredentist expansion of Inner Mongolia into areas that had majorities of Han and Manchu peoples.

After the Chinese Communist Revolution, Hulunbuir was annexed into Inner Mongolia, but the region kept economic ties to the rest of the northeast via the Chinese Eastern Railway. During the Cultural Revolution, the parts of historical Manchuria inside Inner Mongolia were briefly restored to their original provinces; Hulunbuir was given back to Heilongjiang from 1969 to 1979. Until October 10, 2001, Hulunbuir was administered as a League. The area is 263,953 km^{2} (101,913 sq mi) and had a population of 2.710 million in 2004, while the gross domestic product was RMB 21.326 billion. The jurisdiction area of the city is larger than all but 8 Chinese province-level divisions (and 42 U.S. states), although the actual urban agglomeration is just a very small part of the region, and the average population density of the area is very low.

== Names ==
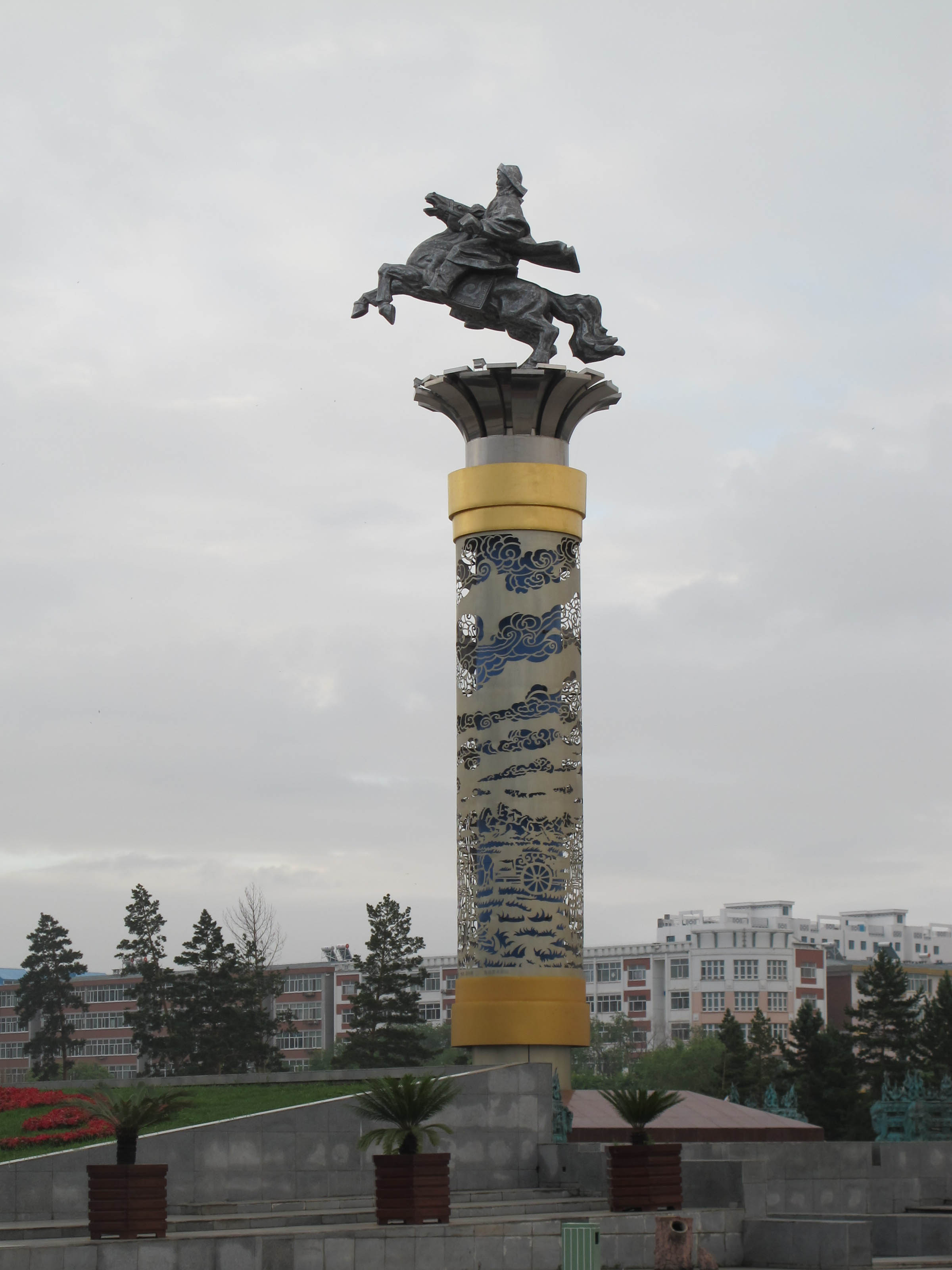
Monument of Genghis Khan on Sükhbaatar Square, Hailar

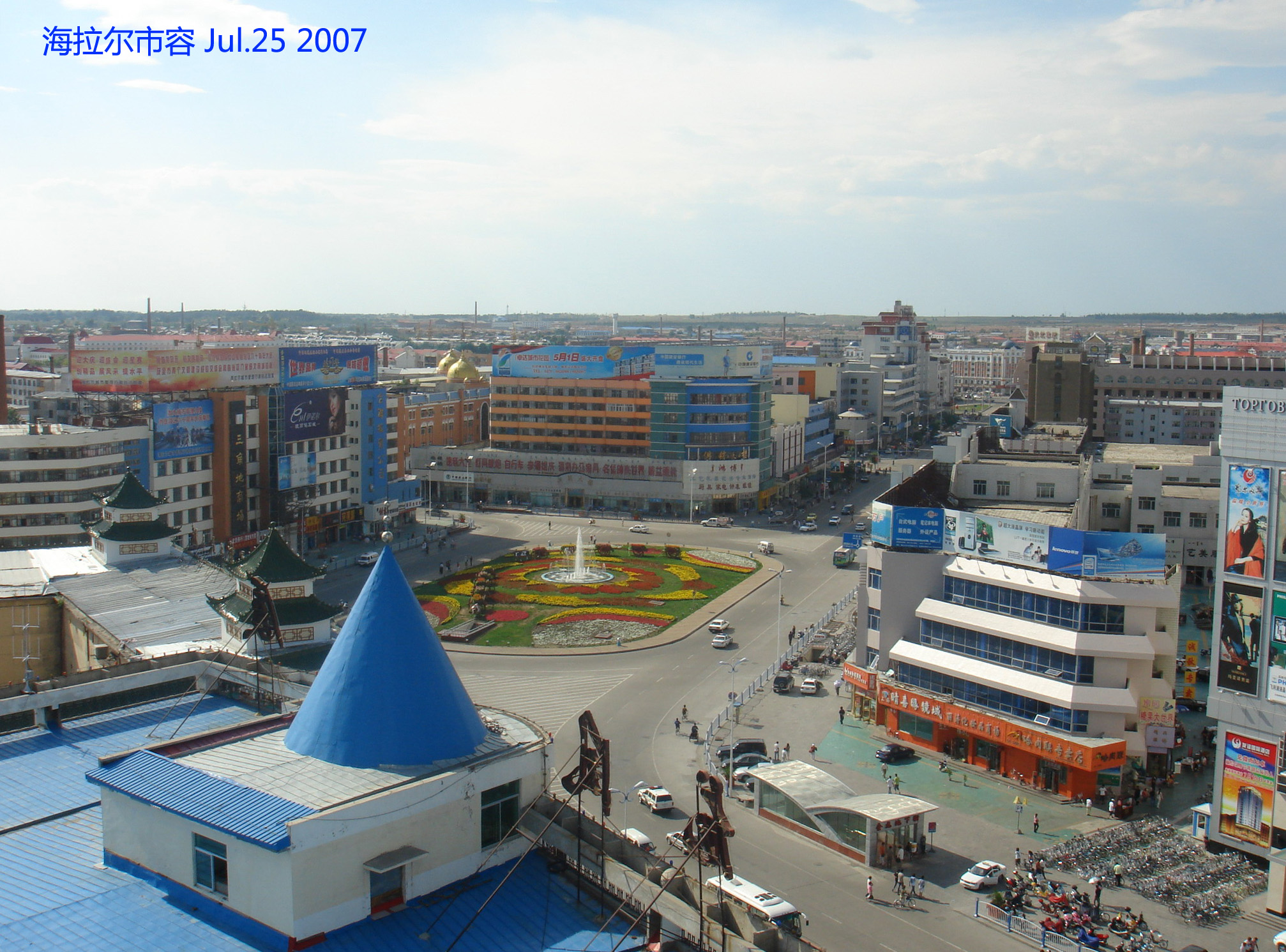
Downtown Hailar in 2007

The city was once a league (盟) of Inner Mongolia, until 10 October 2001. During the Qing dynasty, it was known in Mandarin as Hūlúnbùyǔ'ěr (simplified Chinese: 呼伦布雨尔; traditional Chinese: 呼倫布雨爾).

== Administrative subdivisions ==
Hulunbuir is divided into 14 different county-level jurisdictions: two district, five county-level cities, four banners and three autonomous banners.

Map
| Name | Mongolian | Hanzi | Hanyu Pinyin | Population (2010) | Area (km^{2}) | Density (/km^{2}) |
|---|---|---|---|---|---|---|
| Hailar District | ᠬᠠᠶᠢᠯᠠᠷ ᠲᠣᠭᠣᠷᠢᠭ (Qayilar toɣoriɣ) | 海拉尔区 | Hǎilā'ěr Qū | 344,947 | 1,440 | 181 |
| Jalainur District | ᠵᠠᠯᠠᠢᠳᠨᠠᠭᠤᠷ ᠲᠣᠭᠣᠷᠢᠭ (Jalainaɣur toɣoriɣ) | 扎赉诺尔区 | Zhālàinuò'ěr Qū | 97,000 | 272 | 357 |
| Manzhouli City | ᠮᠠᠨᠵᠤᠤᠷ ᠬᠣᠲᠠ (Manjuur qota) | 满洲里市 | Mǎnzhōulǐ Shì | 152,473 | 424 | 360 |
| Zalantun City | ᠵᠠᠯᠠᠨ ᠠᠶᠢᠯ ᠬᠣᠲᠠ (Jalan Ayil qota) | 扎兰屯市 | Zhālántún Shì | 366,326 | 16,800 | 21.8 |
| Yakeshi City | ᠶᠠᠭᠰᠢ ᠬᠣᠲᠠ (Yaɣsi qota) | 牙克石市 | Yákèshí Shì | 352,177 | 27,590 | 12.8 |
| Genhe City (Gengol City) | ᠭᠡᠭᠡᠨ ᠭᠣᠣᠯ ᠬᠣᠲᠠ (Gegen Ɣool qota) | 根河市 | Gēnhé Shì | 110,441 | 19,659 | 5.6 |
| Ergun City | ᠡᠷᠭᠦᠨ᠎ᠡ ᠬᠣᠲᠠ (Ergün-e qota) | 额尔古纳市 | É'ěrgǔnà Shì | 76,667 | 28,000 | 2.7 |
| Arun Banner | ᠠᠷᠤᠨ ᠬᠣᠰᠢᠭᠤ (Arun qosiɣu) | 阿荣旗 | Āróng Qí | 278,744 | 12,063 | 23.1 |
| New Barag Right Banner (Xin Barag Barun Banner) | ᠰᠢᠨ᠎ᠡ ᠪᠠᠷᠭᠤ ᠪᠠᠷᠠᠭᠤᠨ ᠬᠣᠰᠢᠭᠤ (Sin-e Barɣu Baraɣun qosiɣu) | 新巴尔虎右旗 | Xīnbā'ěrhǔ Yòu Qí | 36,356 | 25,102 | 1.4 |
| New Barag Left Banner (Xin Barag Jun Banner) | ᠰᠢᠨ᠎ᠡ ᠪᠠᠷᠭᠤ ᠵᠡᠭᠦᠨ ᠬᠣᠰᠢᠭᠤ (Sin-e Barɣu Jegün qosiɣu) | 新巴尔虎左旗 | Xīnbā'ěrhǔ Zuǒ Qí | 40,258 | 22,000 | 1.8 |
| Old Barag Banner (Huqin Barag Banner) | ᠬᠠᠭᠤᠴᠢᠨ ᠪᠠᠷᠭᠤ ᠬᠣᠰᠢᠭᠤ (Qaɣučin Barɣu qosiɣu) | 陈巴尔虎旗 | Chénbā'ěrhǔ Qí | 58,244 | 21,192 | 2.7 |
| Oroqen Autonomous Banner | ᠣᠷᠴᠣᠨ ᠤ ᠥᠪᠡᠷᠲᠡᠭᠡᠨ ᠵᠠᠰᠠᠬᠤ ᠬᠣᠰᠢᠭᠤ (Orčon-u öbertegen jasaqu qosiɣu) | 鄂伦春自治旗 | Èlúnchūn Zìzhìqí | 223,752 | 59,800 | 3.7 |
| Ewenki Autonomous Banner | ᠡᠸᠡᠩᠬᠢ ᠥᠪᠡᠷᠲᠡᠭᠡᠨ ᠵᠠᠰᠠᠬᠤ ᠬᠣᠰᠢᠭᠤ (Eveŋki öbertegen jasaqu qosiɣu) | 鄂温克族自治旗 | Èwēnkèzú Zìzhìqí | 134,981 | 19,111 | 7.1 |
| Morin Dawa Daur Autonomous Banner | ᠮᠣᠷᠢᠨ ᠳᠠᠪᠠᠭ᠎ᠠ ᠳᠠᠭᠤᠷ ᠥᠪᠡᠷᠲᠡᠭᠡᠨ ᠵᠠᠰᠠᠬᠤ ᠬᠣᠰᠢᠭᠤ (Morin Dabaɣ-a Daɣur öbertegen jasaqu qosiɣu) | 莫力达瓦达斡尔族自治旗 | Mòlìdáwǎ Dáwò'ěrzú Zìzhìqí | 276,912 | 10,500 | 26.4 |
Part of Oroqin Autonomous Banner is de facto subordinate to Daxing'anling Prefecture in Heilongjiang.

== Geography and climate ==
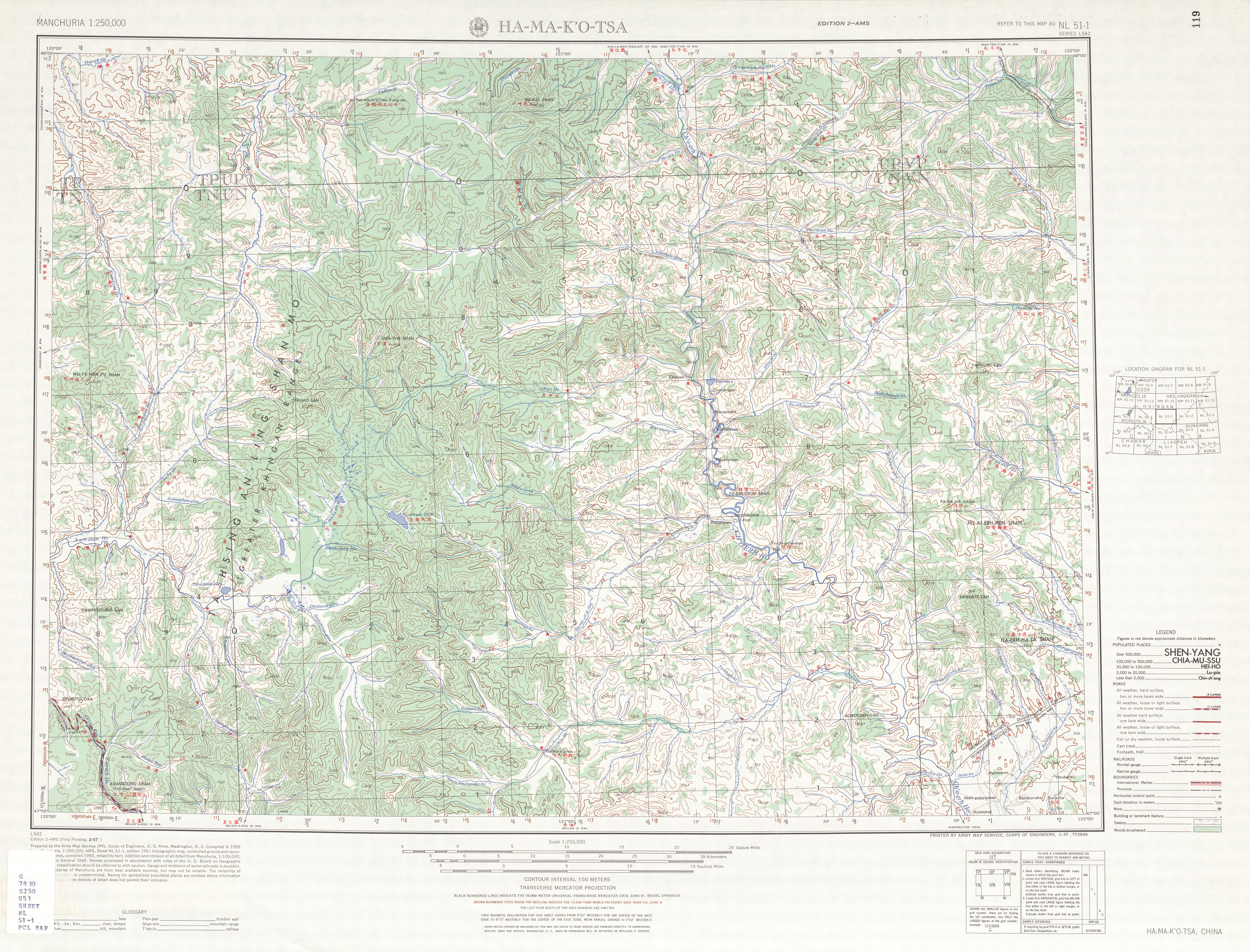
Map including part of the Hulunbuir area (AMS, 1955)

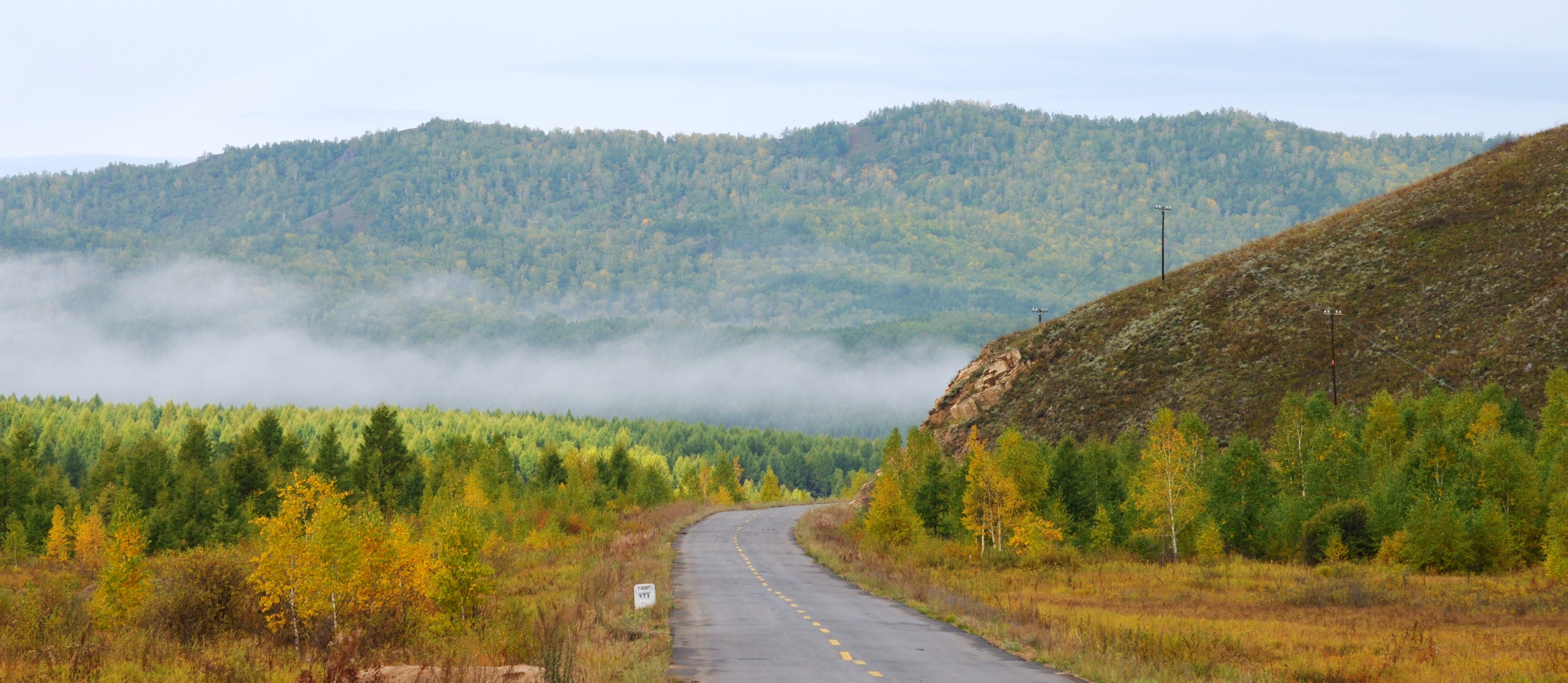
Mo'erdaoga Forest Park, Ergun

Hulunbuir itself (Hailar) has an extreme humid continental climate (Köppen Dwb, Trewartha Dcbd/Dcbc). Winters are long, very dry and severe, due to the semi−permanent Siberian High, while summers are short, though very warm, and rather wet, due to the East Asian monsoon. At Hailar, the monthly 24-hour average temperature ranges from −25.0 °C (−13.0 °F) in January to 20.9 °C (70 °F) in July, while the annual mean is −0.2 °C (31.6 °F), relatively cold. With at least 58% of possible sunshine in all months and an annual total greater than 2,591.1 hours, sunny weather dominates year-round. Approximately 51% of the annual rainfall occurs in July and August.

Climate data for Hailar District, elevation 650 m (2,130 ft), (1991–2020 normals, extremes 1909–present)
| Month | Jan | Feb | Mar | Apr | May | Jun | Jul | Aug | Sep | Oct | Nov | Dec | Year |
|---|---|---|---|---|---|---|---|---|---|---|---|---|---|
| Record high °C (°F) | −1.0 (30.2) | 4.3 (39.7) | 16.2 (61.2) | 29.4 (84.9) | 35.4 (95.7) | 38.8 (101.8) | 41.7 (107.1) | 39.6 (103.3) | 33.2 (91.8) | 26.2 (79.2) | 13.7 (56.7) | 2.4 (36.3) | 41.7 (107.1) |
| Mean daily maximum °C (°F) | −19.8 (−3.6) | −13.7 (7.3) | −3.2 (26.2) | 9.7 (49.5) | 18.9 (66.0) | 24.9 (76.8) | 26.7 (80.1) | 24.7 (76.5) | 18.2 (64.8) | 7.9 (46.2) | −6.2 (20.8) | −17.1 (1.2) | 5.9 (42.7) |
| Daily mean °C (°F) | −25.0 (−13.0) | −20.0 (−4.0) | −9.6 (14.7) | 3.2 (37.8) | 12.0 (53.6) | 18.4 (65.1) | 20.9 (69.6) | 18.6 (65.5) | 11.4 (52.5) | 1.3 (34.3) | −11.8 (10.8) | −22.0 (−7.6) | −0.2 (31.6) |
| Mean daily minimum °C (°F) | −29.2 (−20.6) | −25.3 (−13.5) | −15.5 (4.1) | −2.9 (26.8) | 4.9 (40.8) | 11.8 (53.2) | 15.4 (59.7) | 13.1 (55.6) | 5.5 (41.9) | −3.9 (25.0) | −16.3 (2.7) | −26.2 (−15.2) | −5.7 (21.7) |
| Record low °C (°F) | −42.9 (−45.2) | −42.3 (−44.1) | −37.2 (−35.0) | −21.6 (−6.9) | −11.1 (12.0) | 0.0 (32.0) | 5.3 (41.5) | 1.1 (34.0) | −7.9 (17.8) | −23.9 (−11.0) | −38.0 (−36.4) | −42.8 (−45.0) | −42.9 (−45.2) |
| Average precipitation mm (inches) | 3.9 (0.15) | 3.6 (0.14) | 5.9 (0.23) | 13.8 (0.54) | 24.9 (0.98) | 53.3 (2.10) | 96.5 (3.80) | 78.6 (3.09) | 35.7 (1.41) | 16.8 (0.66) | 6.7 (0.26) | 6.9 (0.27) | 346.6 (13.63) |
| Average precipitation days (≥ 0.1 mm) | 6.3 | 4.6 | 4.7 | 5.3 | 7.6 | 11.9 | 13.9 | 12.1 | 8.7 | 6.4 | 6.8 | 8.5 | 96.8 |
| Average snowy days | 8.8 | 6.7 | 7.0 | 5.4 | 1.1 | 0.1 | 0 | 0 | 0.6 | 5.2 | 9.5 | 11.6 | 56 |
| Average relative humidity (%) | 75 | 75 | 68 | 50 | 45 | 57 | 66 | 68 | 62 | 61 | 72 | 77 | 65 |
| Mean monthly sunshine hours | 154.5 | 191.8 | 250.7 | 244.0 | 264.5 | 269.1 | 260.1 | 248.1 | 223.0 | 197.3 | 156.5 | 131.5 | 2,591.1 |
| Percentage possible sunshine | 57 | 66 | 67 | 59 | 56 | 56 | 54 | 56 | 60 | 60 | 58 | 52 | 58 |
Source: China Meteorological Administrationall-time extreme temperature

== Demographics ==
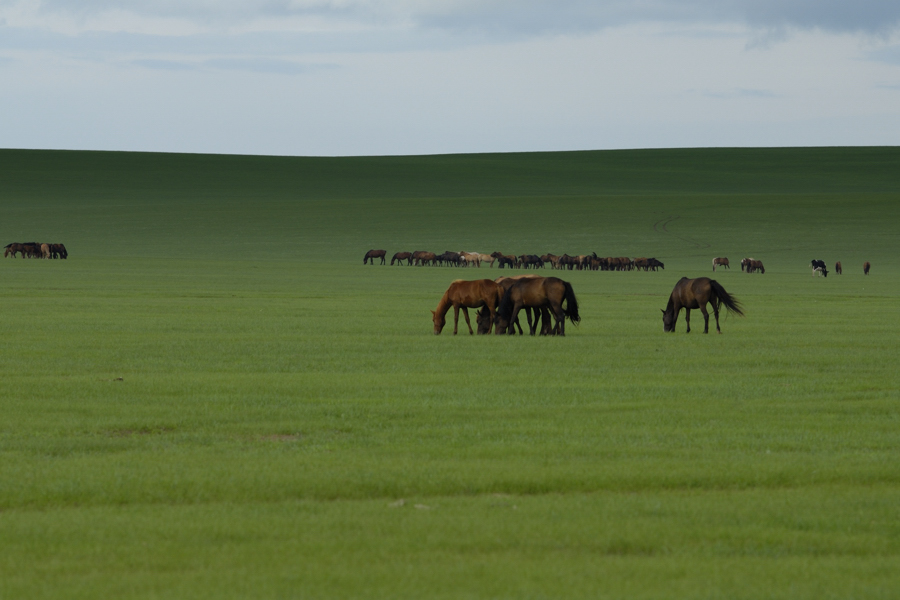
Horses in Old Barag Banner

| Ethnic group | Population in 2000 | Share |
|---|---|---|
| Han | 2,199,645 | 81.85% |
| Mongols | 231,276 | 8.6% |
| Daur | 111,053 | 4.13% |
| Hui | 70,287 | 2.62% |
| Evenks | 30,950 | 1.15% |
| Oroqen | 8,355 | 0.31% |
| Russians | 4,741 | 0.18% |

== Transport ==
Airports include:

- Hulunbuir Hailar Airport – Hailar
- Zhalantun Chengjisihan Airport – Zhalantun
- Xinbarag Youqi Baogede Airport – New Barag Right Banner

== See also ==
- Hulun (alliance)
