= Ximen (disambiguation) =

Ximen (Chinese: 西門) is a Chinese surname.

Ximen may also refer to:

- Pedro Ximénez, a Spanish wine grape
- Ximending, a commercial district in Taipei, Taiwan
- Ximen metro station, a metro station in Taipei, Taiwan
