= Taipeh Prefecture =

Historical administrative division in Taiwan

Taipeh Prefecture (Chinese: 臺北府) was a Qing dynasty prefecture created from the northern part of Taiwan Prefecture, Qing-era Taiwan in 1875, while the island was still part of Fujian Province. It consisted of a region surrounding modern-day Taipei, including present-day Hsinchu, Hsinchu County, Taoyuan City, New Taipei City, Taipei, Keelung, and Yilan County. The reorganization started after Imperial Commissioner Shen Baozhen demanded that another prefecture be added in Taiwan to revamp the administrative organization of the northern area of the island. The walls of the prefecture capital were completed in 1884.

In 1885, work commenced to establish Fokien-Taiwan Province and the island's capital, which had formerly been in the south at Tainan, was temporarily moved north to Taipeh (Taipei), which was then under construction. In 1887, the province was declared and reorganized into four prefectures: Taipeh, Taiwan, Tainan, and Taitung. Taipeh Prefecture included the districts of Tamsui (淡水區), Gilan (宜蘭縣), and Hsinchu (新竹縣), plus the sub-prefecture of Keelung (基隆廳). Due to multiple factors, the island's capital permanently remained at Taipeh-fu; modern-day Taipei carries on the name of this prefecture.

After Japanese rule began in 1895, most areas included in the prefecture (other than present-day Hsinchu and Hsinchu County) were included in the new Taihoku Prefecture in 1920.

== See also ==
- Walls of Taipeh
- Taihoku Prefecture
- Taiwan Prefecture
- Fujian Province
- History of Taiwan

== Notes and Bibliography ==
=== Bibliography ===
- Davidson, James W. (1903). "Chapter XVII: Progressive Formosa : A Province of China. 1886-1894". The Island of Formosa, Past and Present : history, people, resources, and commercial prospects : tea, camphor, sugar, gold, coal, sulphur, economical plants, and other productions. London and New York: Macmillan & co. OL 6931635M.
- Skinner, George W.; Baker, Hugh D. R., eds. (1977). The City in Late Imperial China. Stanford University Press. ISBN 9780804708920. OCLC 2883862.
