= Walls of Taipei =

City walls in Taiwan

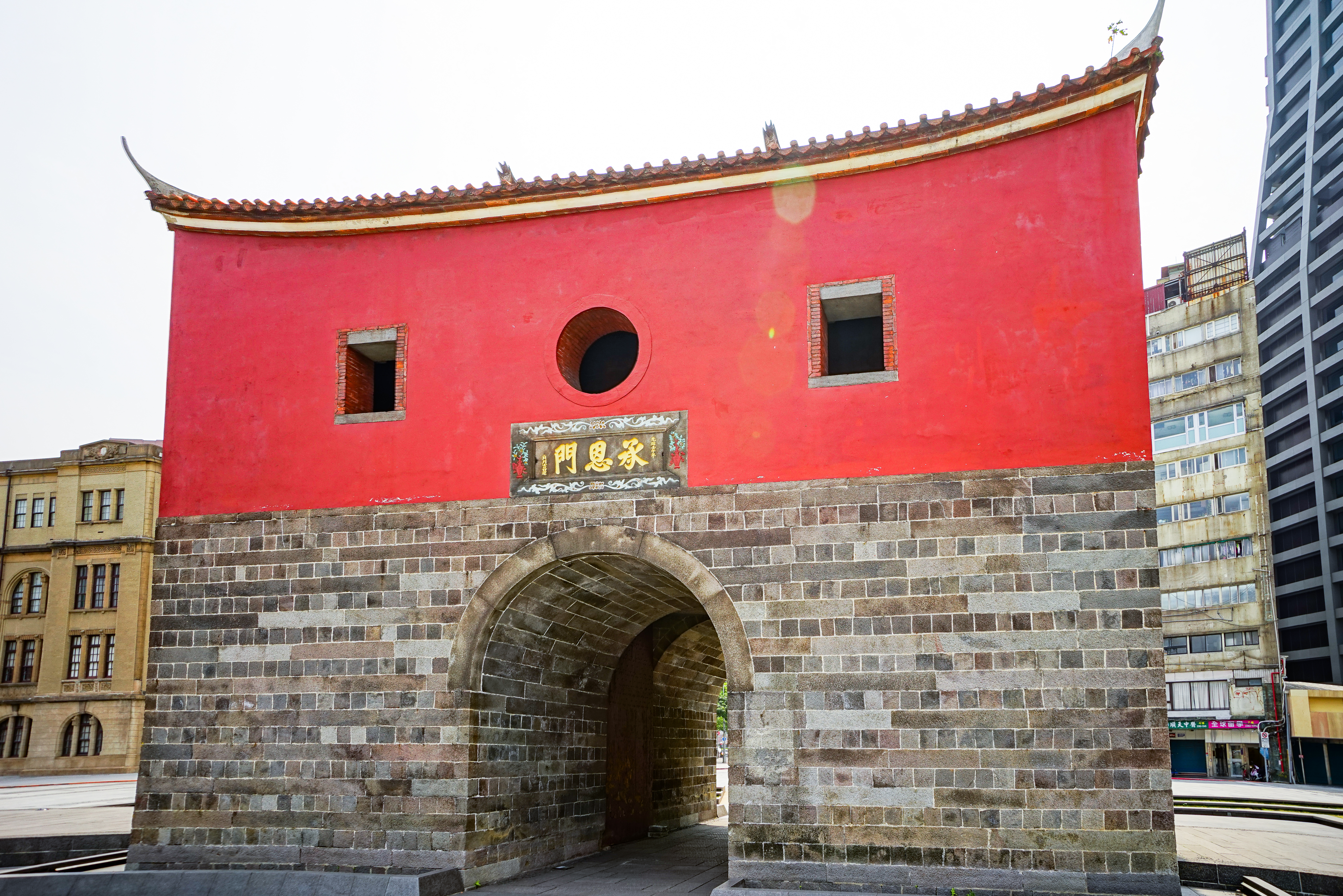
Taipei's North Gate, completed in 1884

The Taipei City Walls (Chinese: 臺北府城; pinyin: Táiběi Fǔchéng) were constructed in 1884 in Taipeh Prefecture, Taiwan, Qing dynasty (modern-day Taipei, Taiwan). Shortly after the Qing dynasty established Taipei Prefecture in 1875, Prefect Chen Hsing-chü (陳星聚) ordered the foundation of a new prefectural capital with enclosing walls in 1879. However the soil proved too soft to support so heavy a structure, and the project was halted. Subsequently, governor of Fujian Cen Yu-ying (岑毓英) and Taiwan magistrate Liu Ao (劉璈) undertook successive surveys to determine the proper location of the wall's foundations. Craftsmen were recruited for the construction in 1882, and the wall was completed in 1884.

Nearly five kilometers in length, it could be accessed by five gates: Taipei East Gate, Taipei West Gate, Taipei South Gate Taipei North Gate, and Little South Gate. The North Gate, the Auxiliary South Gate, and the buttresses of the East Gate were of particularly exquisite design.

In the first years of the Japanese colonial rule (ca. 1895), the city's walls and the West Gate were destroyed as part of the city's restructuring plan. After the handover of Taiwan from Japan to the Republic of China in 1945, the East, South, and Auxiliary South Gates were rebuilt, but the original appearances were not maintained. The North Gate alone retains its original appearance. Its design is a 2-story closed blockhouse of solid construction with traditional Chinese wooden roof truss and streamlined carved ornamentations.

== Gallery ==
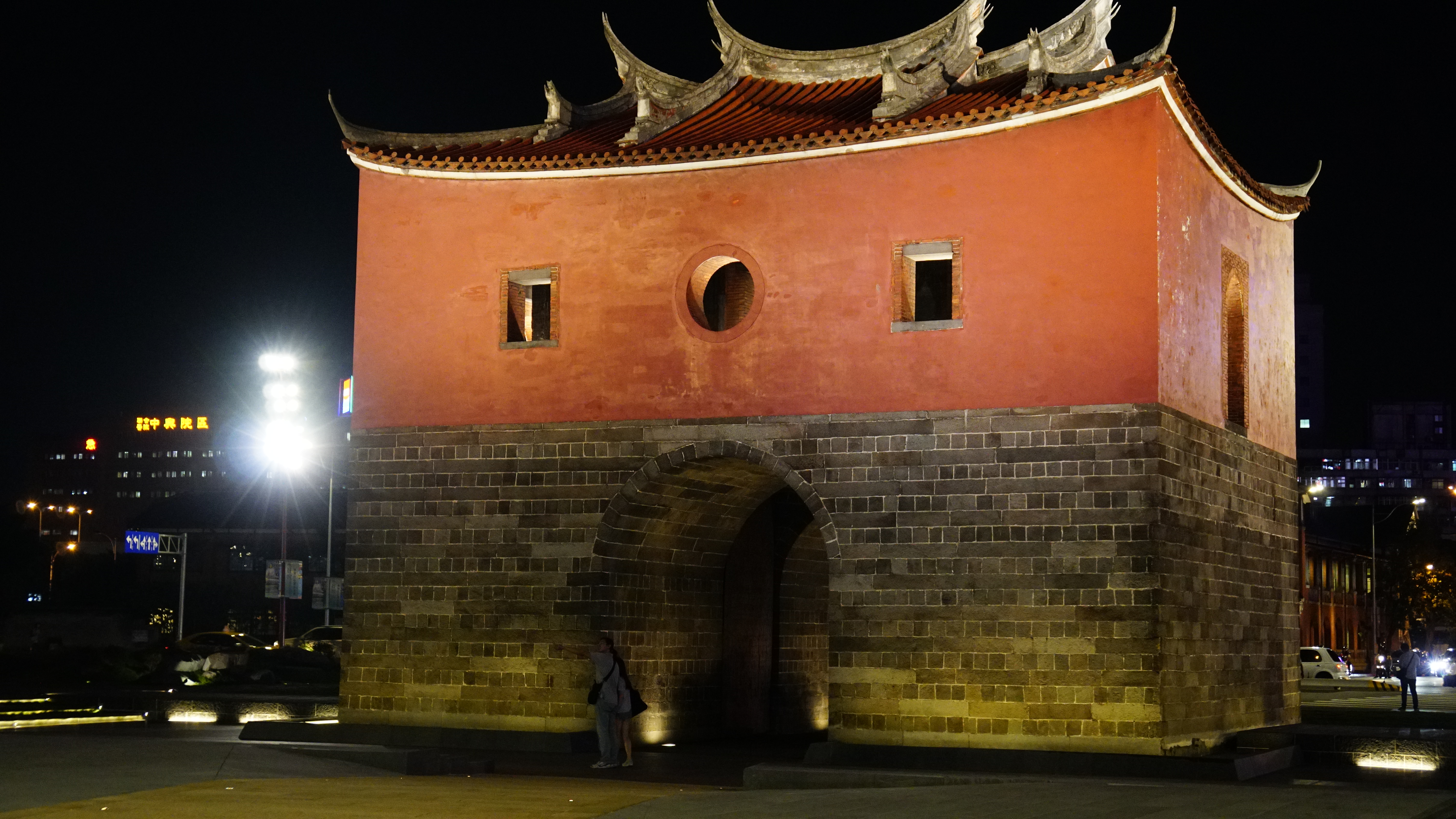
Taipei North Gate at night

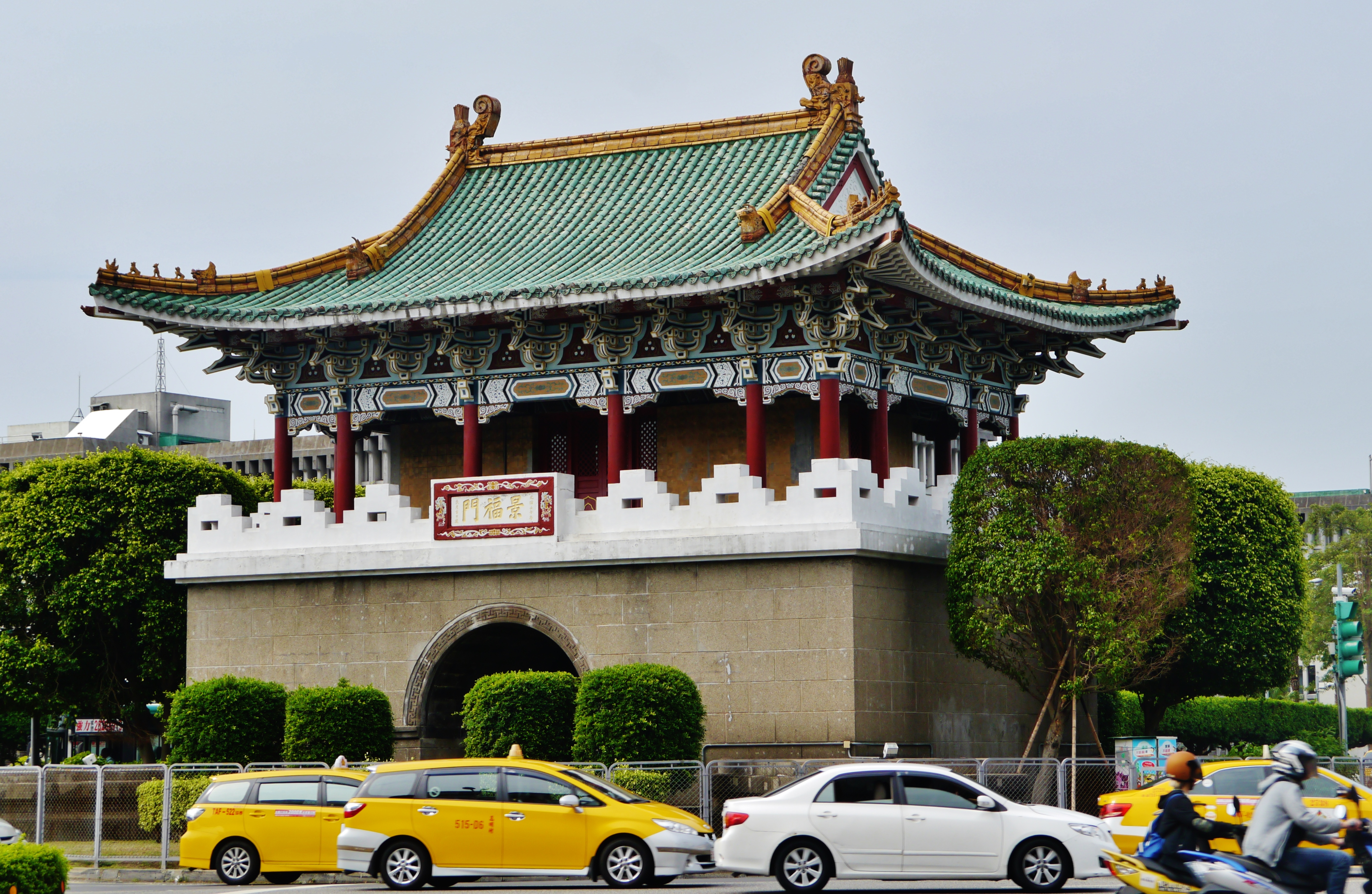
Taipei East Gate

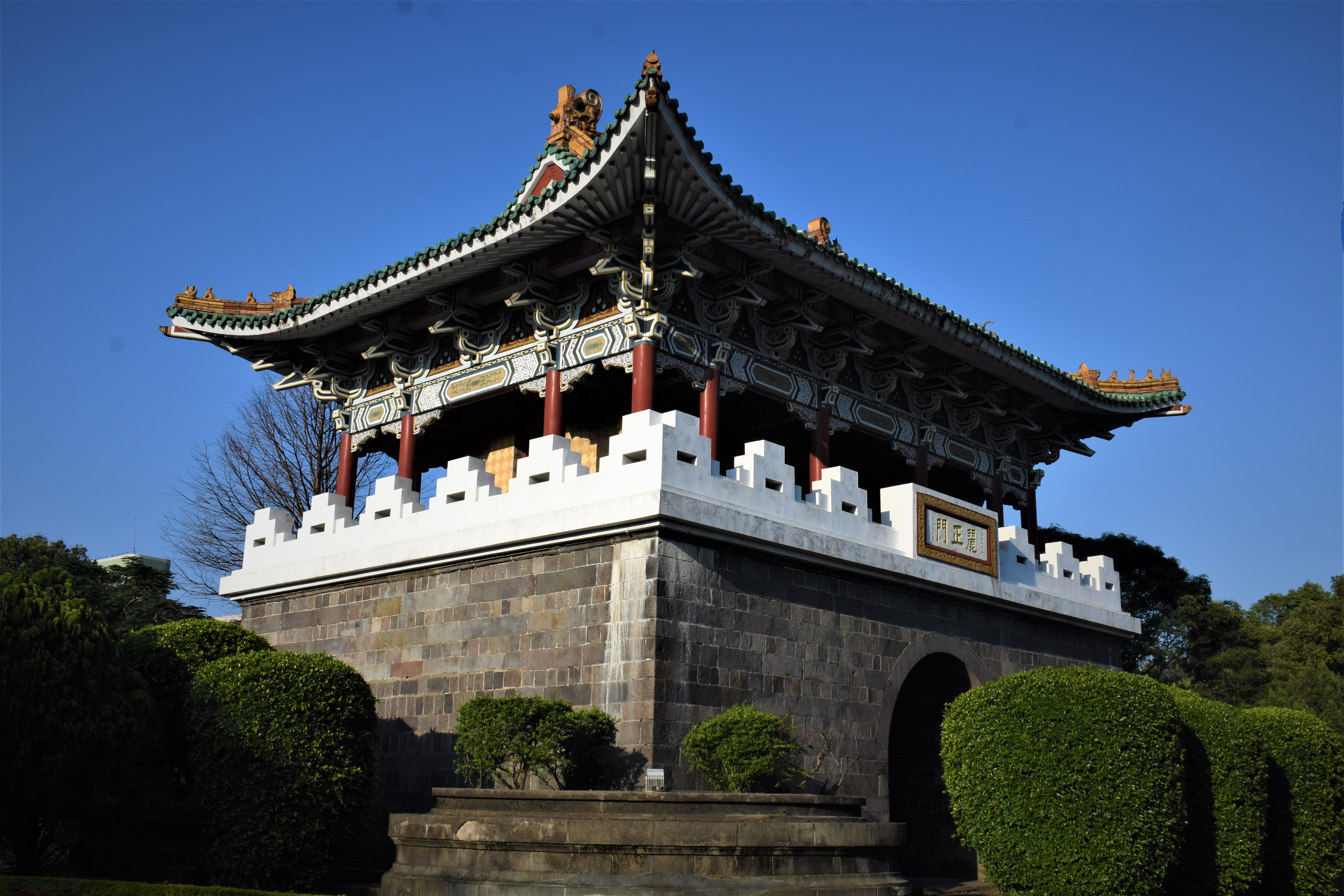
Taipei South Gate

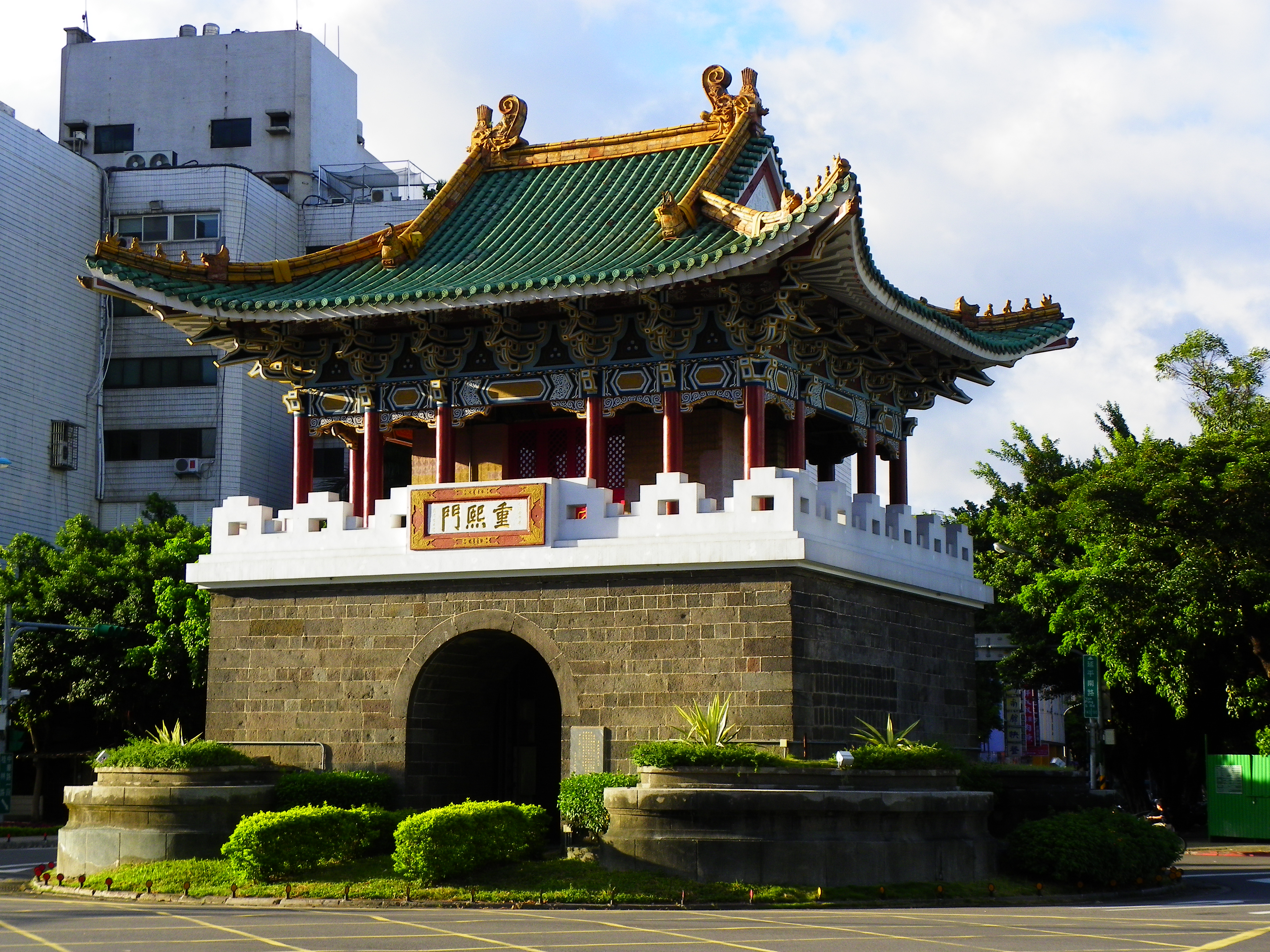
Little South Gate

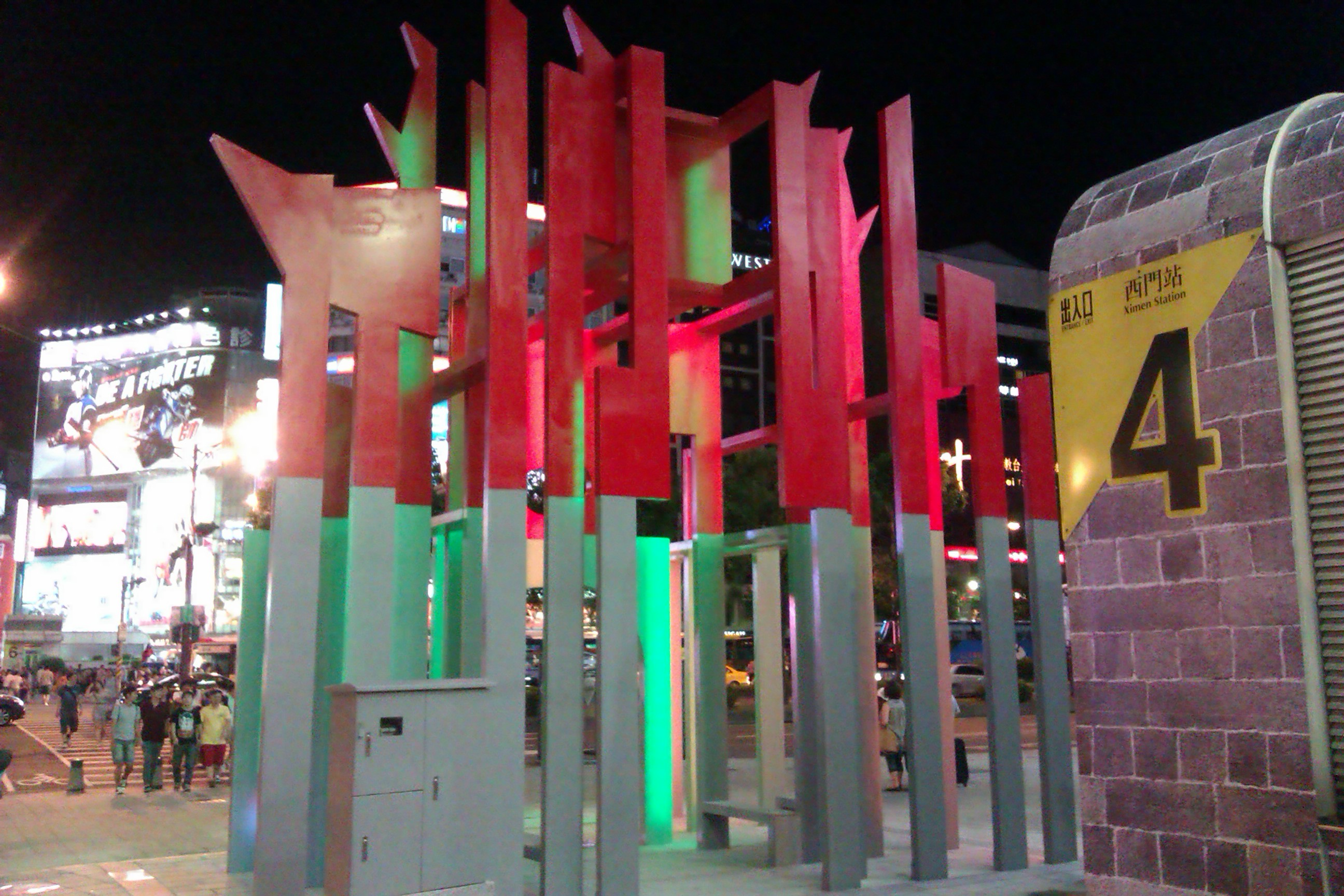
Symbolism of West Gate

== See also ==
- Taiwan under Qing rule
- Ximen metro station
- Beimen metro station
- Dongmen metro station
- Chiang Kai-shek Memorial Hall metro station
- Xiaonanmen metro station
