= Taiwan Prefectural City =

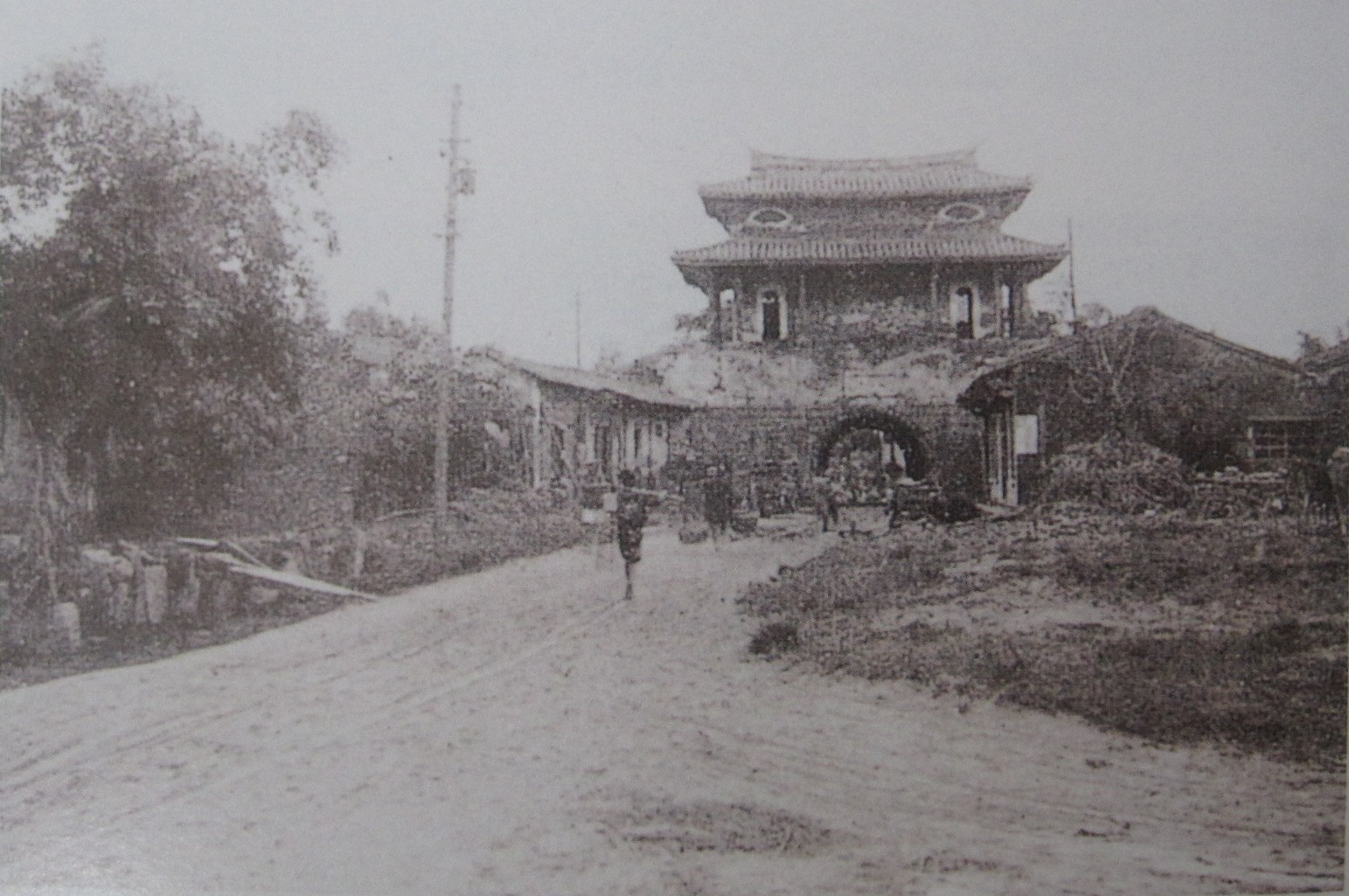
Tainan City East Gate

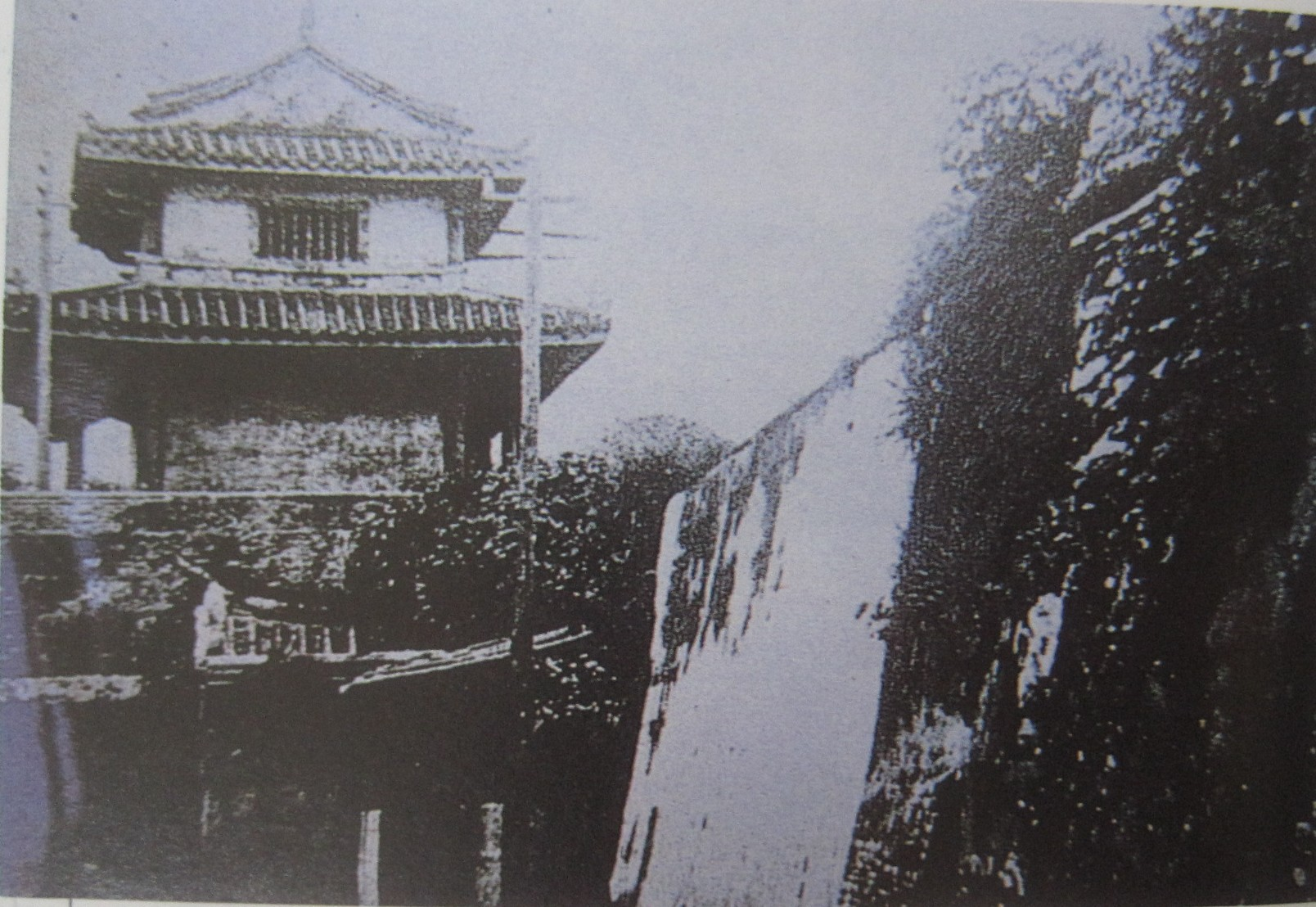
Tainan City West Gate

Taiwan Prefectural City was the prefectural capital of Taiwan Prefecture during the Qing dynasty. After 1887, due to an administrative reorganization in which Taiwan Prefecture was divided to create Tainan Prefecture, the city became known as the Tainan Prefectural City. The new seat of Taiwan Prefecture was established in the newly constructed Taiwan Provincial Capital, and thus the provincial capital became the new Taiwan Prefectural City.

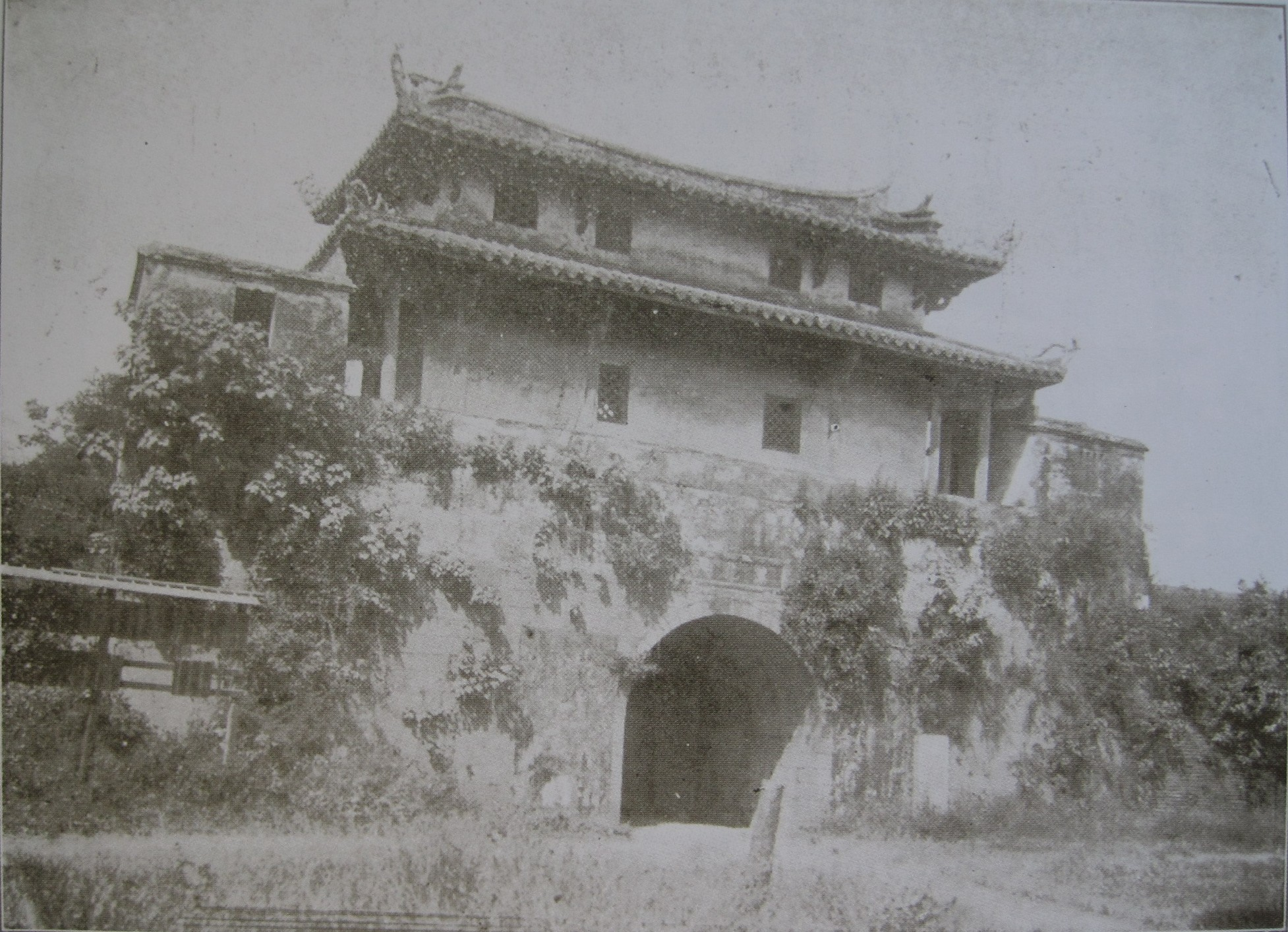
North Gate of Taifu City, Taiwan

Because the Taiwan County Magistrate’s Office, and later the Anping County Magistrate’s Office, were located within the city, it may also be regarded as the county seat of Taiwan County prior to 1887 and the county seat of Anping County thereafter.

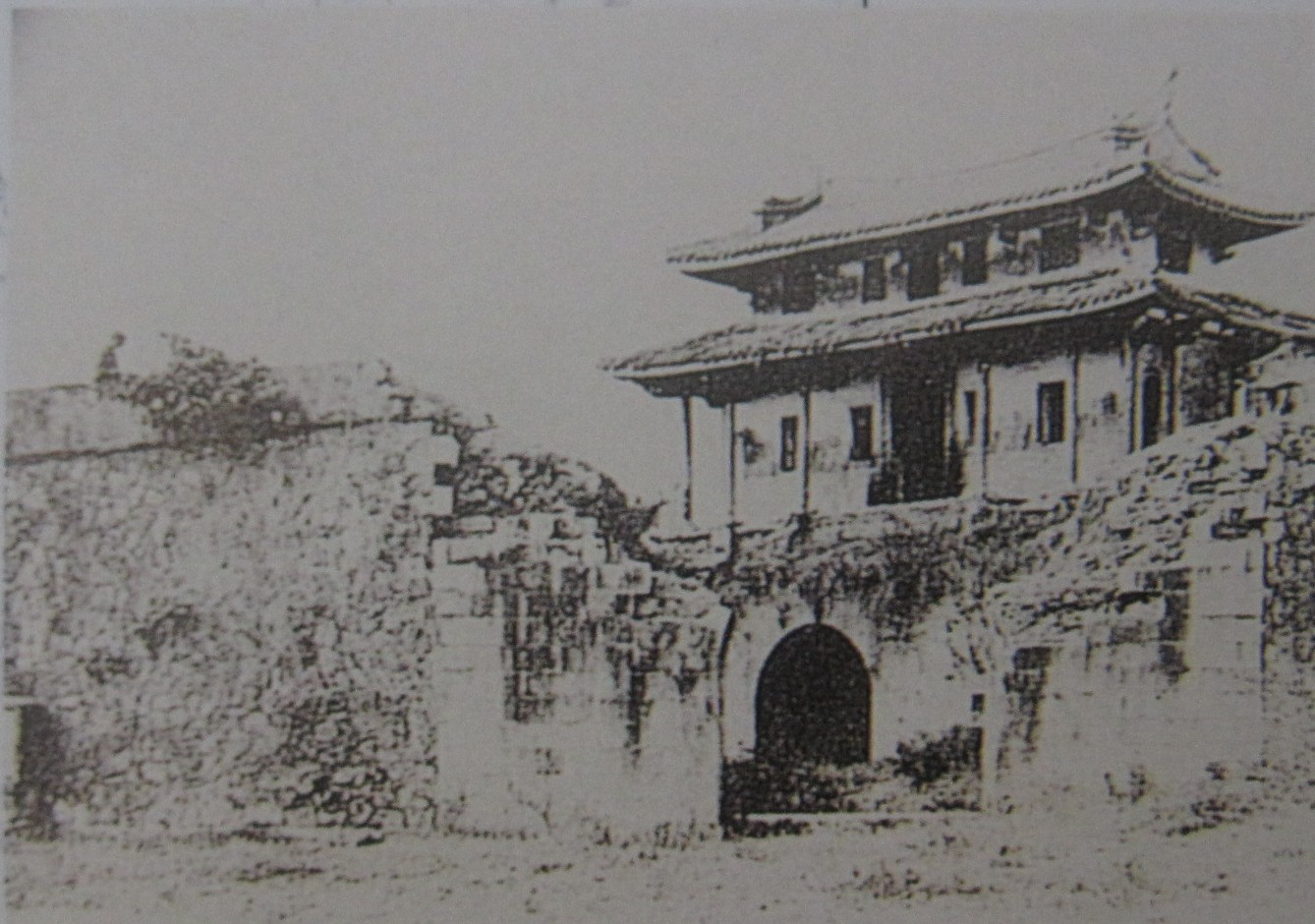
Tainan Gate of Taipei

Construction of the city began in 1723, during the Yongzheng reign of the Qing dynasty. It was initially built as a wooden palisade city, later rebuilt using rammed earth (sanhetu). The city had a total of fourteen city gates. At its greatest extent, the city walls had a circumference of 2,700 zhang (approximately 8.64 kilometers), making it the third-largest walled city in Fujian Province, smaller than Quanzhou Prefectural City (rebuilt during the Shunzhi reign with a circumference of 3,600 zhang) and Fuzhou Prefectural City (with a circumference of 3,349 zhang).

After Taiwan was ceded to Japan, the city walls gradually fell into disrepair. During the period of urban restructuring under Japanese rule, portions of the walls were demolished and replaced by modern roads built along their original alignments. By around 1917, most of the city walls had been dismantled, after an existence of approximately 194 years, although some remnants survive to the present day.

The historical extent of Taiwan Prefectural City largely corresponds to the area east of Ximen Road in today’s West Central District of Tainan City, along with small portions of the East, South, and North districts. The area west of Ximen Road extending to the old settlement of Anping District (Ikunshen) was formerly part of the Taijiang Inner Sea.

== History ==
The earliest fortification to appear in the Tainan area was likely a rudimentary but fire-resistant fortress constructed in 1625 by the Dutch East India Company at the site of today’s Chihkan Tower. Bamboo palisades were also erected around the urban area, extending north and east to the banks of the Deqing River, west toward the vicinity of the former Taijiang Inner Sea, and south to a point not far from the later southern side of Fort Provintia. However, a plague that broke out shortly thereafter caused residents to relocate, and the bamboo palisades fell into disrepair and eventually collapsed. In 1652, the Guo Huaiyi anti-Dutch uprising erupted in Taiwan, and in the following year, the Dutch East India Company constructed Fort Provintia.

During the Kangxi reign, Shi Lang successfully captured the Penghu Islands, leading to the surrender of Zheng Keshuang. At that time, the Qing court showed little interest in Taiwan, regarding the campaign primarily as a means to eliminate anti-Qing forces, and even contemplated a policy of “retaining Penghu while abandoning Taiwan.” Shi Lang subsequently submitted the Memorial on Retaining or Abandoning Taiwan, forcefully arguing for Taiwan’s strategic importance. As a result, Taiwan was formally incorporated into the Qing Empire, and the seat of the Taiwan Prefecture was established in present-day Tainan, making it the island’s administrative capital.

Since the Ming Zheng period, Taiwan Prefecture (modern-day Tainan) had been the administrative center of the entire island. Under Qing rule, Tainan remained the political and administrative core, housing both the Taiwan Circuit and the Taiwan Prefecture offices, and the city developed into a mature urban center. However, the Qing government initially adhered to a policy of not constructing city walls in Taiwan, leaving residents’ lives and property unprotected and official buildings insecure. Despite repeated petitions from local officials, no city wall was built during the first forty years following the establishment of the prefecture.

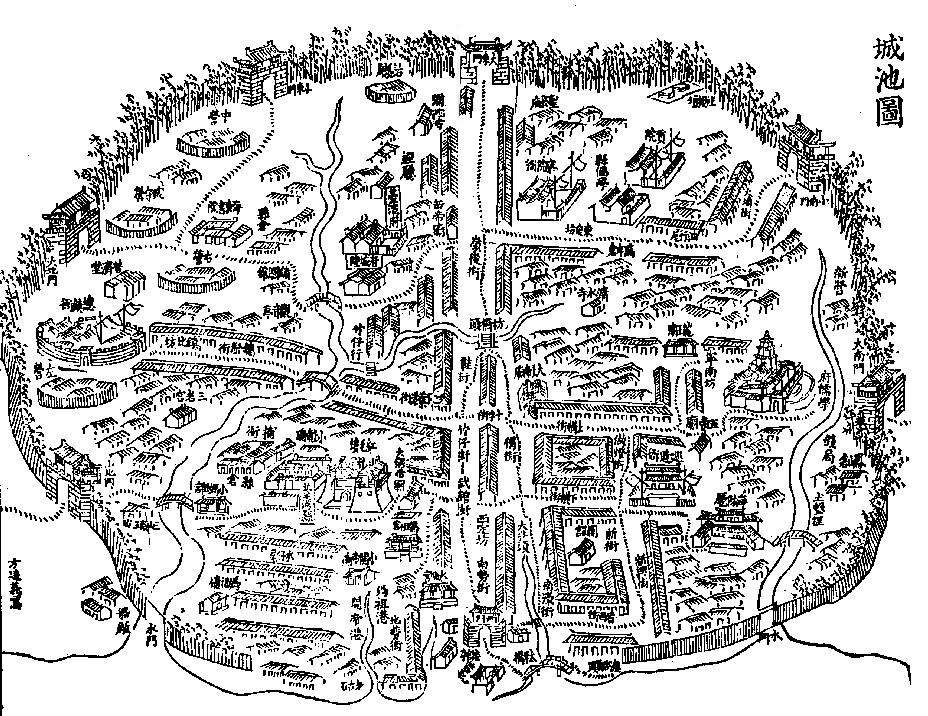
Muzhacheng, as recorded in the 1752 revision of the Taiwan County Gazetteer.

=== Wooden Palisade Period ===
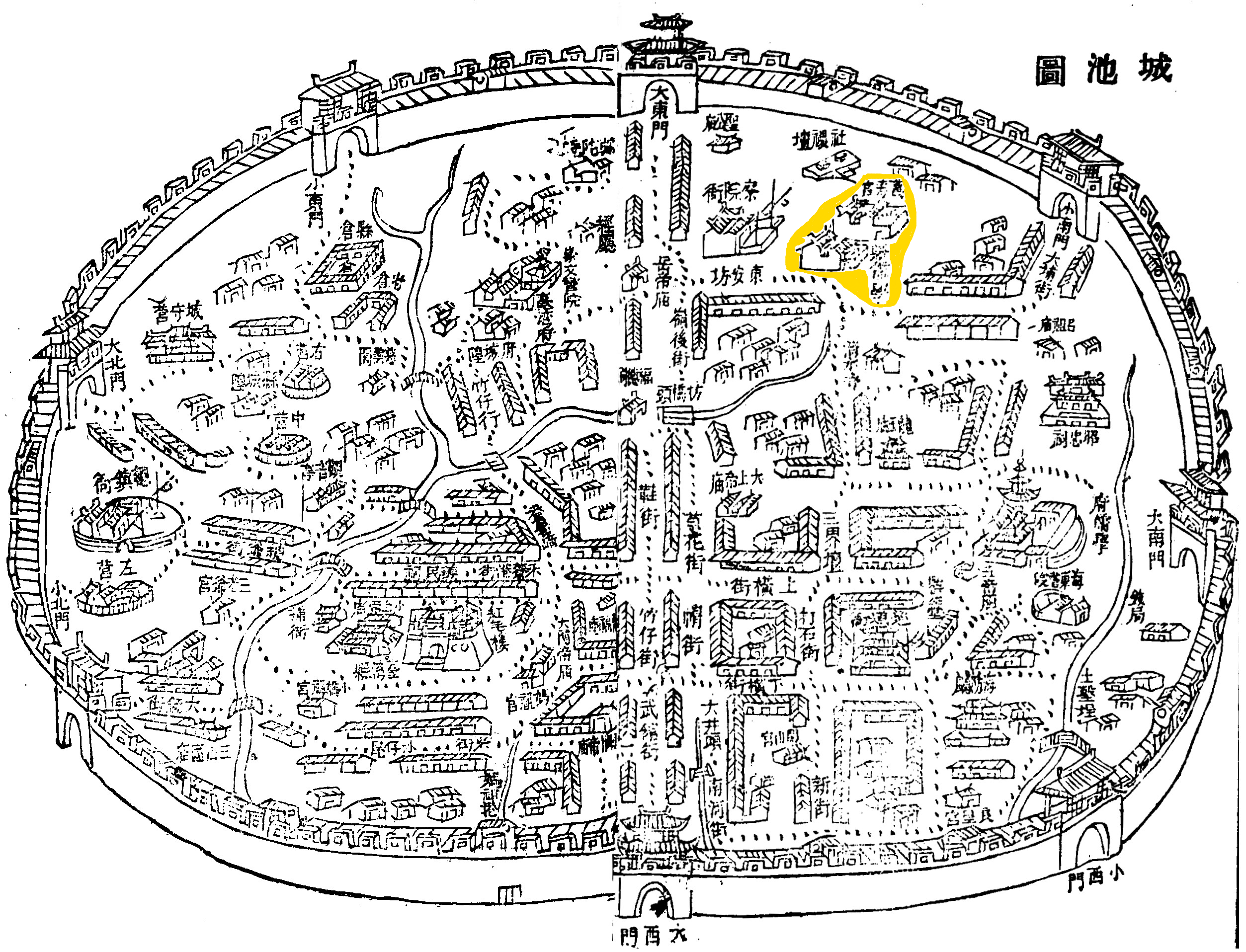
Sanhe Tucheng, which was included in the revised edition of the Taiwan County Gazetteer in 1807.

The period from the commencement of city construction to the 11th year of the Yongzheng reign (1733) is known as the wooden palisade period.

Following the Zhu Yigui Incident in the 60th year of the Kangxi reign (1721), Zhou Zhongxuan, the magistrate of Taiwan County, began constructing wooden palisades around the city in the early Yongzheng period. Some historical records state that the palisade measured 2,147 zhang (6.87 km) in length, while others record a length of 2,662 zhang (8.518 km). At this stage, the prefectural city had only seven gates, and the western side was not fully enclosed, leaving the Greater West Gate standing alone, unconnected to the palisades on either side.

==== Controversy Over the Date of Construction ====
Traditional accounts and several local gazetteers hold that construction of the Taiwan Prefectural City began in the first year of the Yongzheng reign (1723), when Zhou Zhongxuan planned the city walls using wooden palisades. An alternative view argues that construction did not begin in 1723 but rather in the third year of the Yongzheng reign (1725).

Professor Shi Wanshou of the Department of History at National Cheng Kung University supports the 1725 date, citing a passage from the Revised Gazetteer of Taiwan County indicating that Prefect Sun Lu participated in boundary delineation during the construction process. Since Sun Lu only assumed office in the fourth year of Yongzheng and Zhou Zhongxuan also left office that same year, Shi argues that the account recording construction in Yongzheng 3 is more plausible. Fan Shengxiong, a member of the Tainan City Historical Records Committee, also supports this interpretation, citing a memorial submitted by the Manchu imperial inspector Chan Jibu, dated the 16th day of the third lunar month of Yongzheng 3, which notes that construction was scheduled to begin on the 27th of that month. This interpretation has been adopted by local cultural heritage organizations, which organized events in 2005 to commemorate the 280th anniversary of Tainan’s city founding.

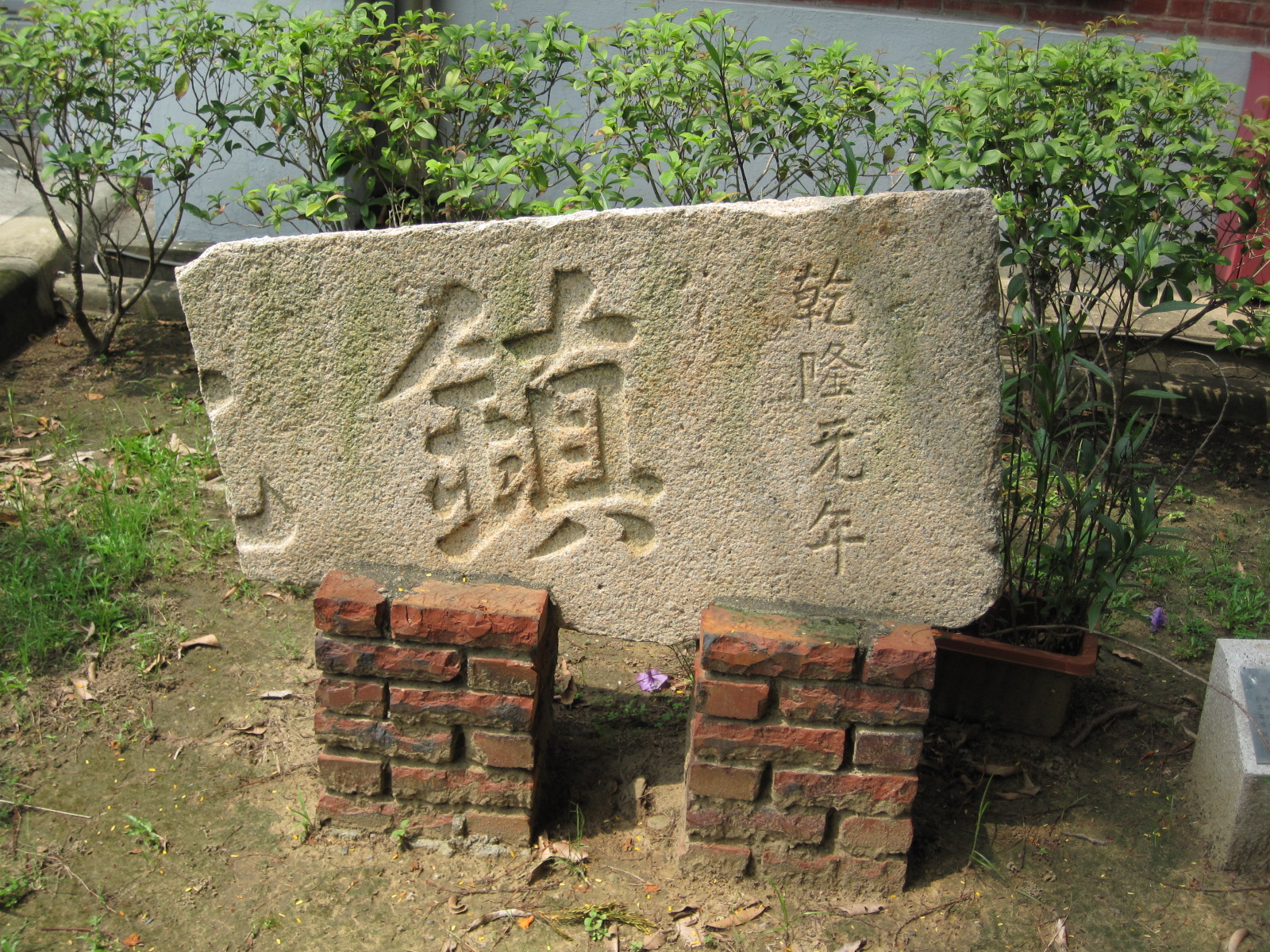
Tainan Xiaobeimen gate plaque

=== Bamboo City Period ===
The period from the 11th year of the Yongzheng reign (1733) to the 53rd year of the Qianlong reign (1788) is known as the bamboo city period.

Following the Wu Fusheng Incident in the 10th year of Yongzheng (1732), Fujian Governor-General Hao Yulin was ordered in 1733 to reinforce the city defenses by planting thorny bamboo. In addition, artillery platforms were built at the locations of what would later become the Minor North Gate and Minor West Gate, with four enemy towers erected outside the Greater West Gate and two outside the Minor North Gate.

In the first year of the Qianlong reign, the seven city gates were rebuilt in stone, and fifteen guardhouses were constructed. In 1759, Taiwan County Magistrate Xia Hu further reinforced the defenses by planting coral bush with toxic sap outside the thorny bamboo barrier. By 1775, Taiwan Prefect Jiang Yuanshu supplemented the defenses by planting Indian coral trees and screw pines, added the Minor West Gate, and repaired artillery platforms and guardhouses.

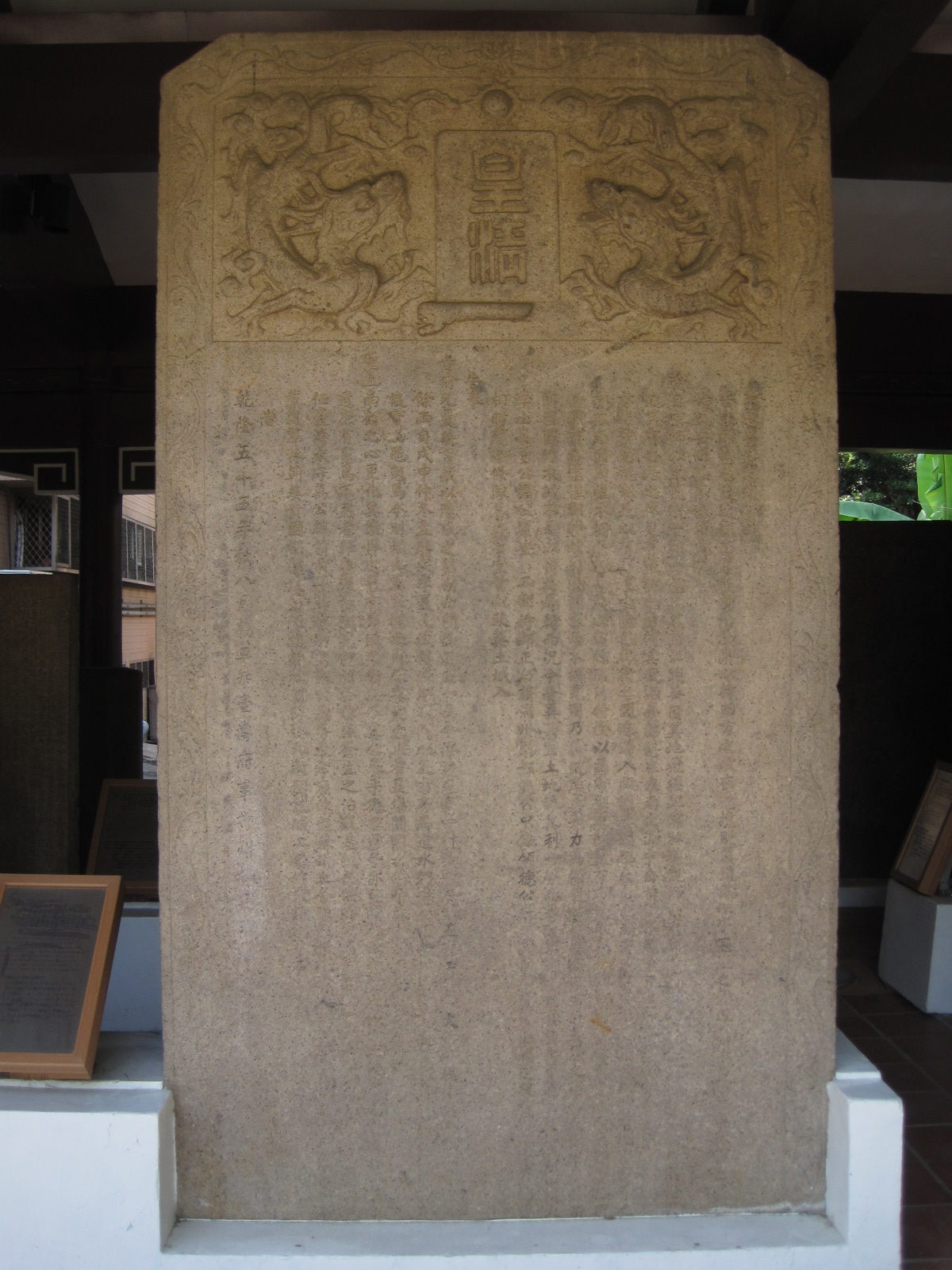
The "Record of the Reconstruction of Taiwan City" erected by Yang Tingli (Nanmen Park Stele Forest, Tainan)

=== Rammed-Earth City Period ===
The period from the 53rd year of the Qianlong reign (1788) until the large-scale demolition of the city walls in 1900 is known as the rammed-earth city period.

Between 1787 and 1788, the Lin Shuangwen Incident erupted, beginning in Changhua and spreading across the island. The conflict lasted over a year and four months and required troop deployments from four provinces to suppress, making it the largest anti-Qing uprising during Qing rule in Taiwan. At the time, city defenses throughout Taiwan consisted primarily of wooden palisades or thorny bamboo. Except for the prefectural city, all county seats fell, exposing the inadequacy of such defenses.

After the rebellion was suppressed, senior Qing officials proposed rebuilding the bamboo-palisade city of Taiwan Prefecture as a rammed-earth city. The proposal was approved, and between 1788 and 1791, Taiwan Prefect Yang Tingli oversaw the reconstruction of the wooden and bamboo city into an earthen-walled city.

The most significant change during this reconstruction was the relocation of the Greater West Gate inward by more than 120 zhang (approximately 400 meters), placing the Five Harbors area outside the city walls. At this time, the city walls stood approximately 5.76 meters high, with a top width of about 4.8 meters, a base width of roughly 6.4 meters, and a total circumference of about 8.064 kilometers.

In 1823, severe storms caused silting along the western coast, and the Zhang Bing Incident in 1832 further heightened security concerns. As a result, the Min-Zhe Governor-General petitioned to construct an outer western city. Upon approval, a publicly funded and managed reconstruction was carried out, opening new gates to the west. An eastern outer city was also added outside the Greater East Gate, with three additional gates constructed. This expansion increased the total city wall circumference to approximately 8.64 kilometers.

Severe storms in 1867 caused extensive damage to the city walls. In 1874, Shen Baozhen carried out the final reconstruction of the Taiwan city walls, with work lasting from September 1874 to January 1875.

=== Abandonment and Demolition ===
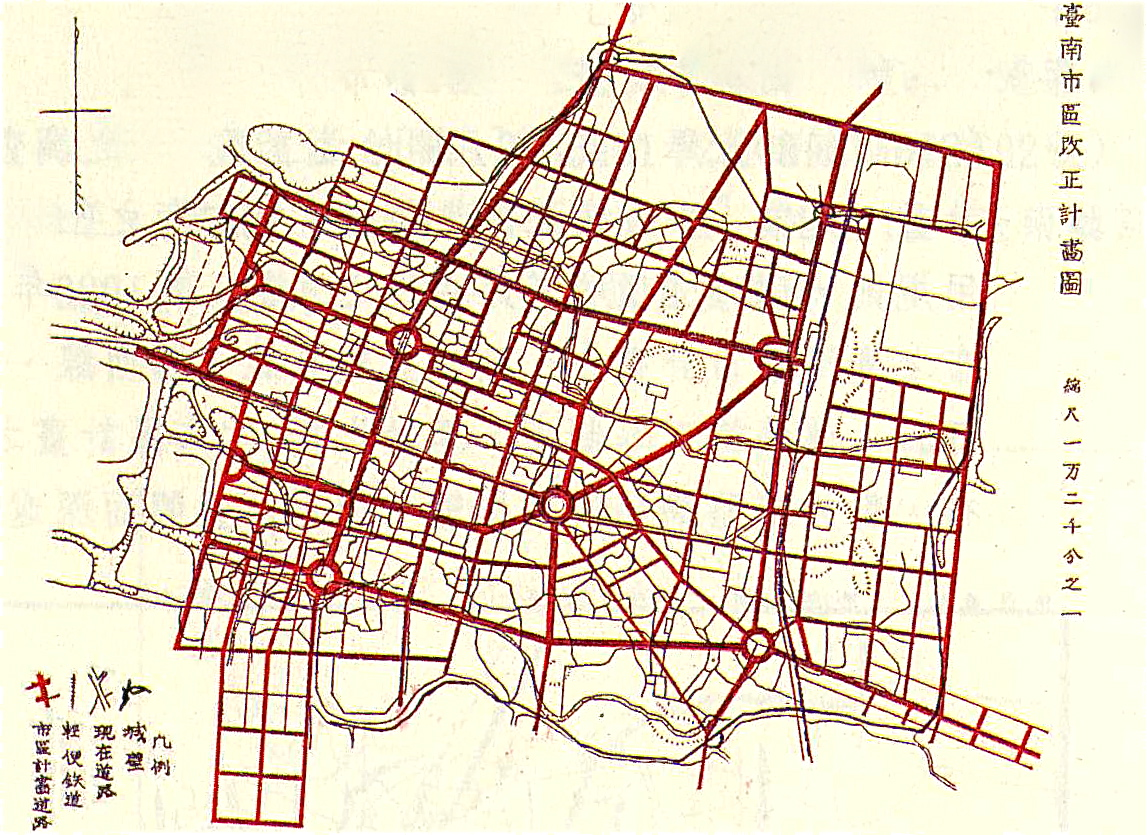
A map of Tainan City's urban redevelopment plan from 1911; showing plans to demolish city walls and build roads.

Following the beginning of Japanese rule in Taiwan, Western concepts of urban planning were introduced. City walls were deemed obstacles to urban development and no longer necessary for defense, leading to their gradual dismantlement. In 1900, the opening of Tainan Station marked a major turning point: the longitudinal railway cut directly through the city wall at the Greater North Gate to enter the city and exited near the Minor South Gate. Subsequent urban improvement plans led to the demolition of most of the remaining walls. For example, the western city wall was converted into a north–south roadway, now known as Ximen Road. By the end of the Japanese colonial period, the vast majority of the city walls had disappeared.

=== Surviving Remains ===
Today, only fragments of the Taiwan Prefectural City remain. Since 1985, surviving remains have gradually been designated as cultural heritage sites. In 2017, the Tainan City Bureau of Cultural Affairs consolidated the already designated historic wall remnants and submitted them for national review. In 2020, they were officially designated as a National Historic Monument under the title “Remains of the City Gates and Walls of the Taiwan Prefectural City.”
