= Taipei South Gate =

Historic structure in Taipei, Taiwan

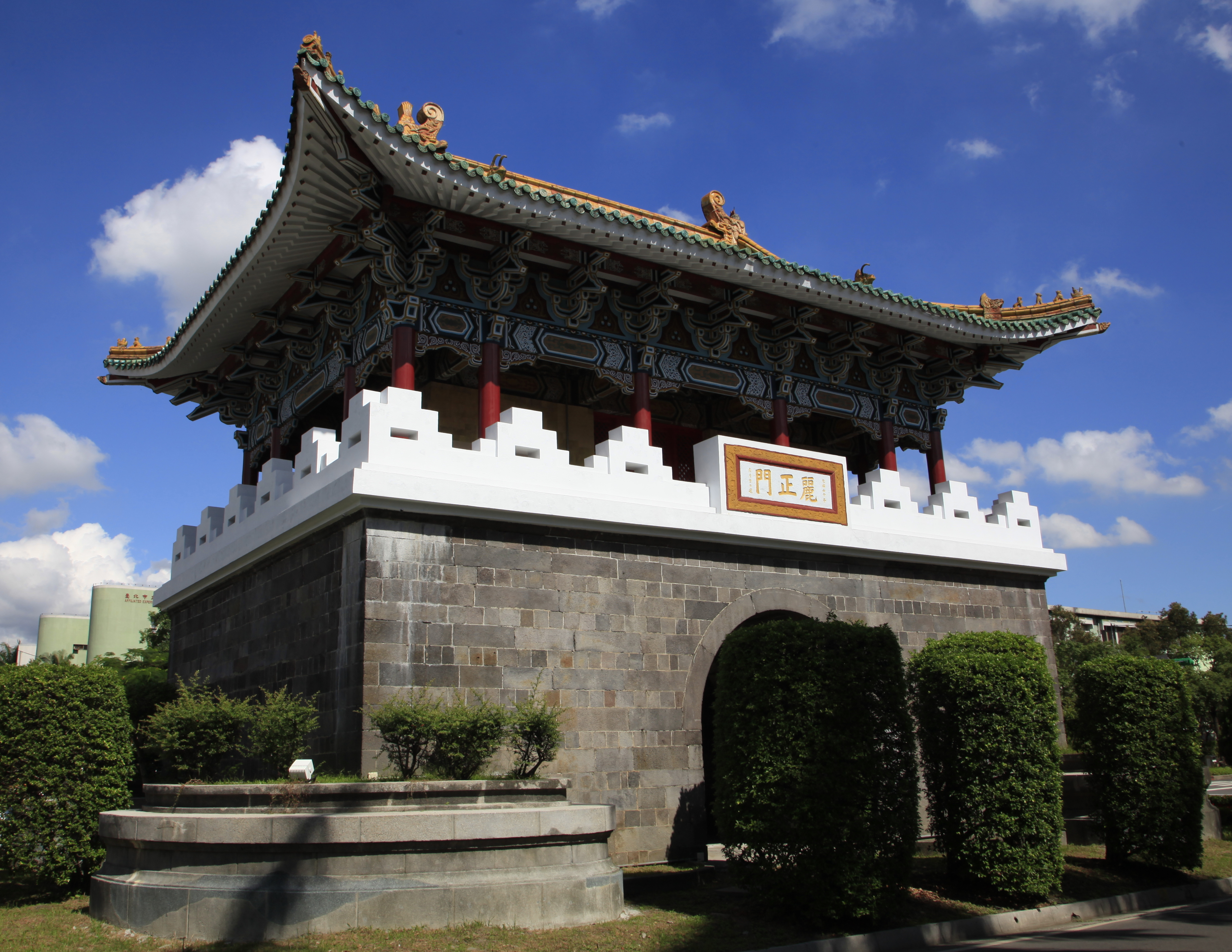
The gate in 2009

The Taipei South Gate is a gate in Taipei, Taiwan.

== Nearest Buildings ==
- Chiang Kai-shek Memorial Hall metro station
- Official Residence of the President
- University of Taipei Bo'ai Campus
- TTL's Monopoly Bureau

== See also ==
- List of tourist attractions in Taipei
- Walls of Taipei
