= Red House Theater =

Theater in Wanhua, Taipei, Taiwan

- 紅樓劇場
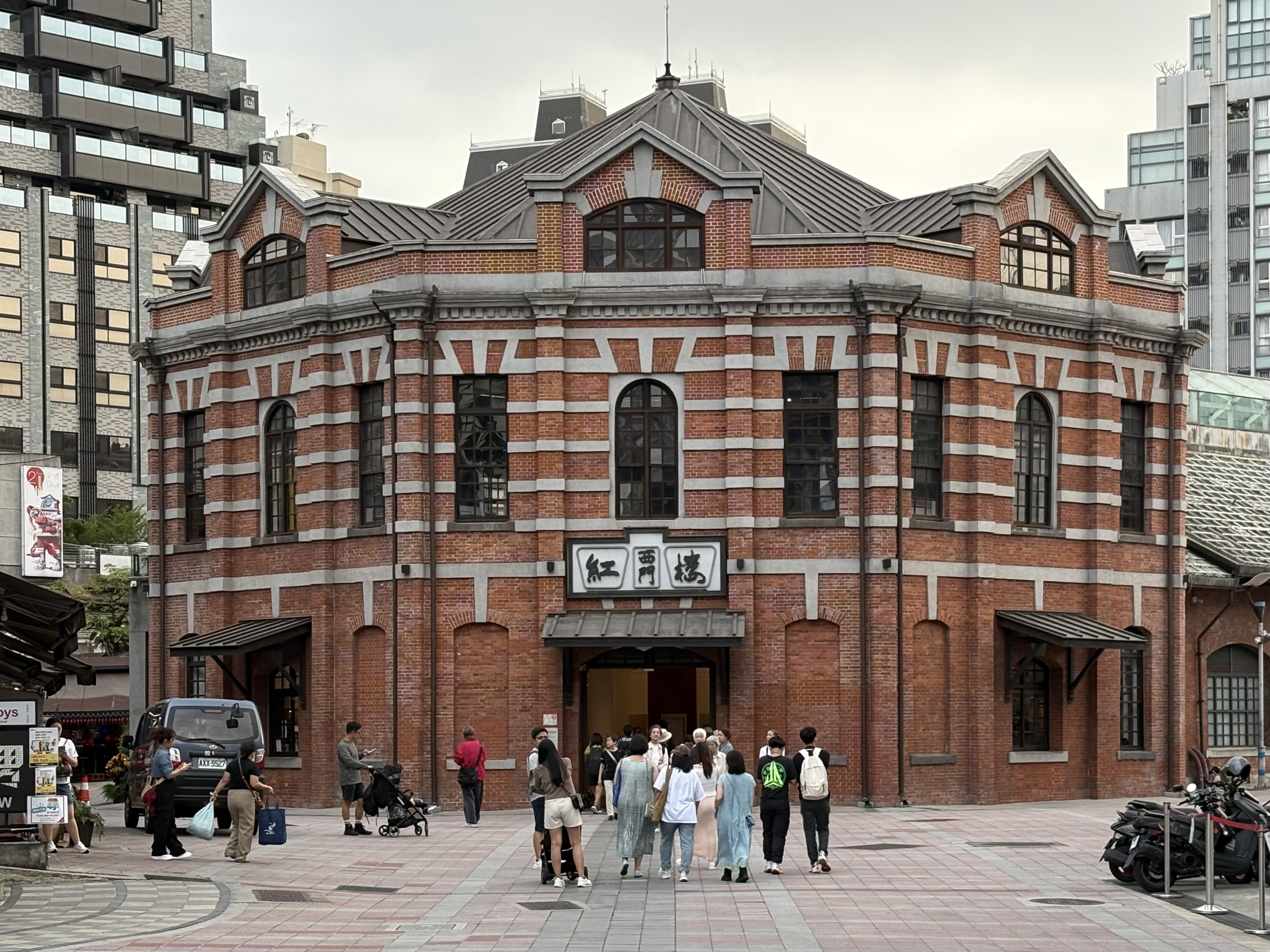
- The facade of the Red House Theatre
- Interactive map of Red House Theater
- Location: Wanhua, Taipei, Taiwan
- Coordinates: 25.041987°N 121.506739°E
- Type: Theater
- Public transit: Ximen Station

Construction
- Built: 1908
- Architect: Kondo Juro

Red House Theater

Chinese name
- Traditional Chinese: 紅樓劇場
- Simplified Chinese: 红楼剧场
Transcriptions
Standard Mandarin
- Hanyu Pinyin: Hónglóu Jùchǎng
- Wade–Giles: Hung-lou Chü-chang

Ximen Honglou
- Traditional Chinese: 西門紅樓
- Simplified Chinese: 西门红楼
Transcriptions
Standard Mandarin
- Hanyu Pinyin: Xīmén Hónglóu
- Wade–Giles: Hsi-men Hung-lou

Japanese name
- Kanji: 西門紅樓
- Kana: せいもんこうろう/さいもんこうろう/しーめんほんろう
Transcriptions
- Romanization: Seimon Kōrō/Saimon Kōrō/Shīmen Honrō

The Red House Theater (Chinese: 紅樓劇場; pinyin: Hónglóu Jùchǎng), often called Hong Lo Red Play House, Red Theater, Ximen Honglou or Ximen Red House in English, is a historic theater in Ximending, Wanhua District, Taipei, Taiwan. The theater is located at 10 Chengdu Road.

== History ==
Built in 1908 during Japanese rule and designed by Japanese architect Kondo Juro, the Red Theater was originally a market building, with its ground floor serving as a department store. The site of the Red Theatre was originally an unmarked graveyard.

From 1945 onwards, the building was used as a theater, housing a troupe performing Peking Opera. The theater's many functions throughout the years signify Taiwan's sociopolitical hybridization.

It was renovated due to a fire in the 2000s. From 2007 onwards, the Red Theater has been managed by the Taipei Culture Foundation, which uses the theater as a platform to promote the Cultural and Creative industries and revive Ximending's community.

The Red House was listed as a Class III Historical Site in 1997. In 2016 the area was subject to an arson attack.

== Architecture ==
The Red House's unique architectural style is characterized by blended Western and Meiji era Japanese architectural patterns. The style of the building can be attributed to its architect's education, as Kondo Juro attended the Tokyo Imperial University, where he became cognizant of Western architectural styles. The Red House consists of an octagonal building, known as the Octagon Building, a Cruciform building and the adjacent square.

In 2015, the Cruciform Building was renovated to restore Taiwan's first marketplace and grocery bazaar. The building is home to the Creative Boutique which provides local labels with aesthetic retail spaces.

In 2016, the Octagon Building underwent the largest-scale renovation in the last 100 years.

== Today ==
The Riverside Live House Corporation Ltd. took control of the horizontal section of the main Cruciform Building in September 2008. It hosts concerts by students and musicians from Thursday throughout the weekend.

The building was converted into a theater in 2007, and has since become a popular part of the gay scene in the neighborhood. It is the site of the annual gay New Year’s Eve countdown and the Taipei Pride and the Mr. Gay World Taiwan pageant.

It was the venue of the Wikimania 2007 Party, which included a short film festival.

In 2017, the main lantern of the Taiwan Lantern Festival was displayed on the square of the Red House, attracting numerous international visitors.

== Amenities ==
The ground floor houses a small cafe and a display on the history of the building, as well as several independent shops. The second-floor theater hosts regular live performances. The theater is within walking distance west from Ximen Station when exiting from Exit 1 and southwest when exiting from Exit 6 on the Taipei Metro.

== See also ==
- Cinema of Taiwan
