= Ximending =

Shopping district in Wanhua, Taipei, Taiwan

Ximending 西門町
- Neighborhood
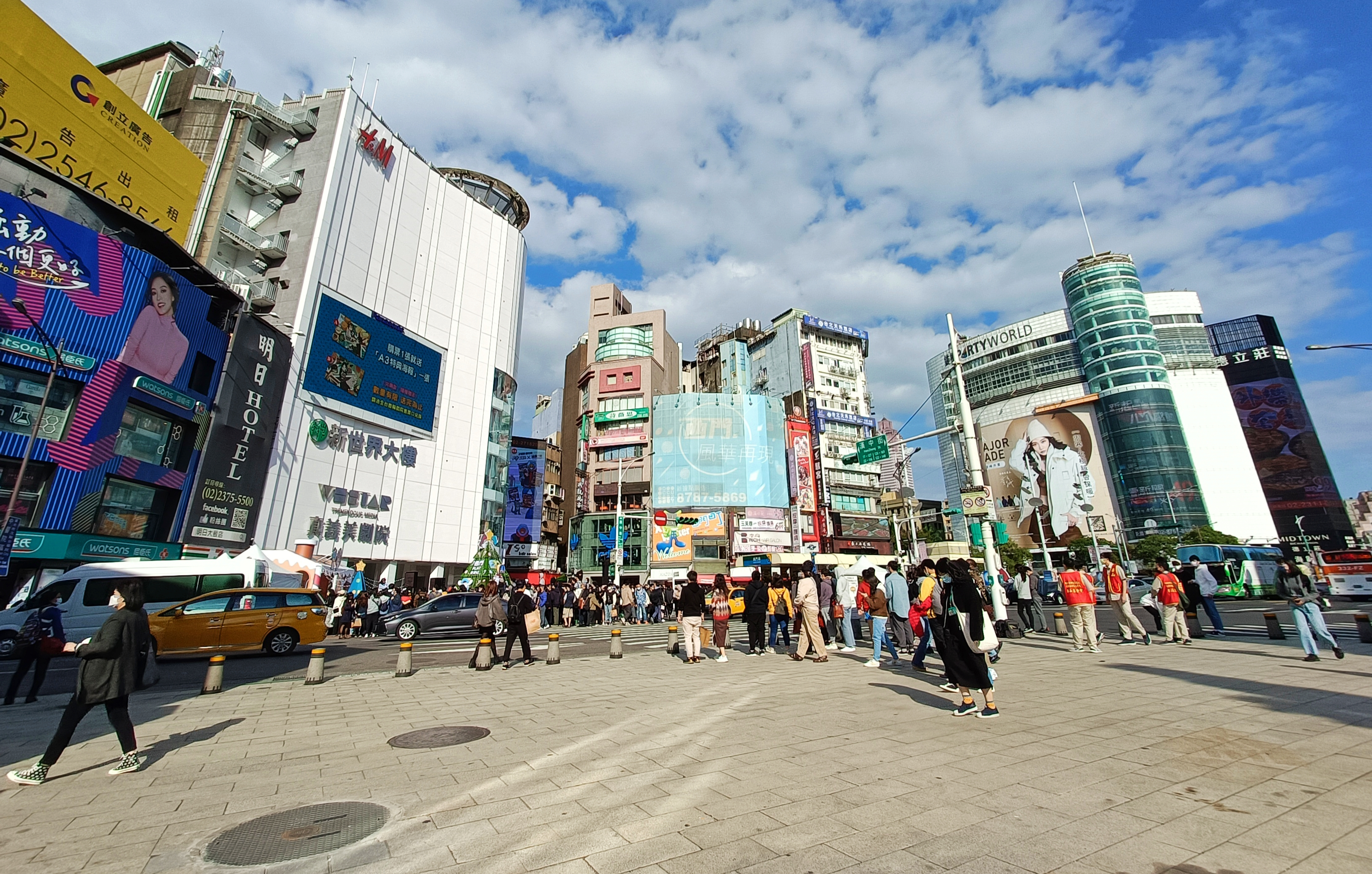
- Intersection of Hanzhong Street and Chengdu Road
- Interactive map of Ximending
- Coordinates: 25°02′34″N 121°30′27″E
- Country: Taiwan
- Special municipality: Taipei
- District: Wanhua

Ximending

Chinese name
- Traditional Chinese: 西門町
- Simplified Chinese: 西门町
Transcriptions
Standard Mandarin
- Hanyu Pinyin: Xīméndīng
- Bopomofo: ㄒㄧ ㄇㄣˊㄉㄧㄥ
- Wade–Giles: Hsimenting
Southern Min
- Hokkien POJ: Se-mn̂g-teng
- Tâi-lô: Se-mn̂g-ting

Japanese name
- Kanji: 西門町
- Hiragana: せいもんちょう
- Katakana: シーメンディン
Transcriptions
- Revised Hepburn: Seimon-chō

Ximending is a neighborhood and shopping district in the Wanhua District of Taipei, Taiwan. The Ximending Pedestrian Area was the first pedestrian zone constructed in Taipei and remains the largest in Taiwan.

== History ==
=== Name ===
The area is named after the administrative division Seimon-chō (西門町), which existed during the Japanese rule, referring to an area outside the west gate of the city. The area of Seimon-chō included modern-day Chengdu Road (成都路), Xining South Road (西寧南路), Kunming Street (昆明街), and Kangding Road (康定路).

Today, the Ximending Pedestrian Area not only includes Seimon-chō but also Wakatake-chō (若竹町) and Shinki-chō (新起町). The historical spelling of this area was Hsimenting, which is based on the Wade–Giles romanization of Standard Chinese. The use of the character chō (町) is unusual in a Chinese context: it denotes a chō (a part of a ward) in the Japanese municipality system.

=== Theater street ===
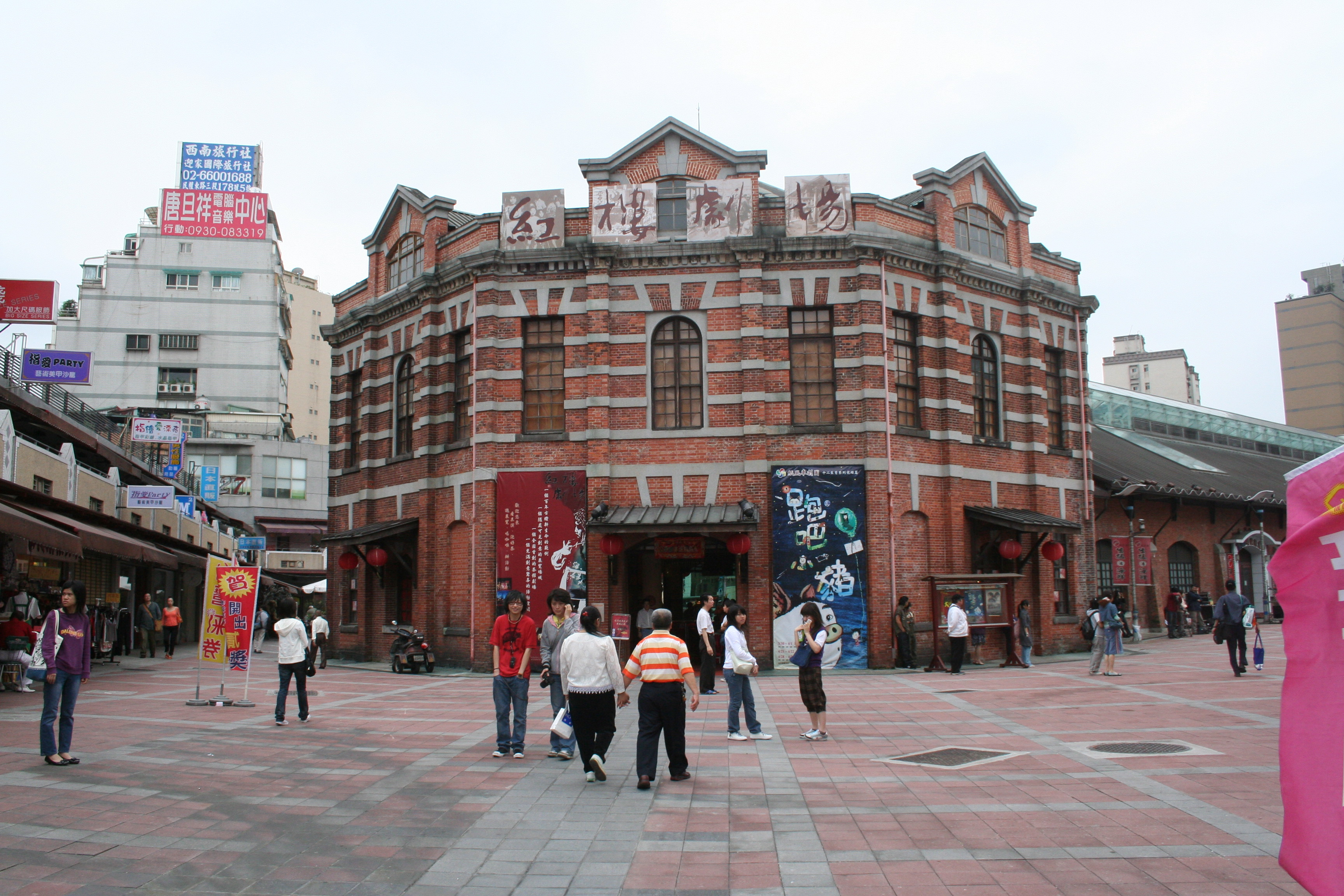
The historic Red House Theater in Ximending

Ximending became a well-known theater street in Taipei in the 1930s and grew even more prosperous after the defeat of Japan, becoming vastly more popular in the following decade At one point, Wuchang St Section 1 had over ten theaters. However, in the 1990s, as Taipei City developed toward the Eastern District and away from Ximending, it began to lose business. In 1999, the city government and local stores established Ximending as a pedestrian area, prohibiting the entrance of vehicles on weekends and national holidays, a move that attracted young consumers and brought back business. Today, Ximending has over twenty theaters and six thousand vendors, and is a popular area for small concerts, album launches, and street performances. It is also home to the Red Envelope Clubs set up in the 1960s.

The area around the Red House Theater is considered a center of Taipei's LGBT culture, and Ximending has often featured prominently in Taiwan Pride marches/parades.

=== Historic sites ===
Because of its history, Ximending is home to several historical sites. Ximending Mazu Temple (西門町媽祖廟) is one of the important and prominent historical temple. Originally opened as a market, the Red House Theater is another prominent building.

The namesake West Gate and the Walls of Taipei were torn down in 1905. Chunghwa Market used to extend to this area, but was demolished in 1992.

== Shops ==
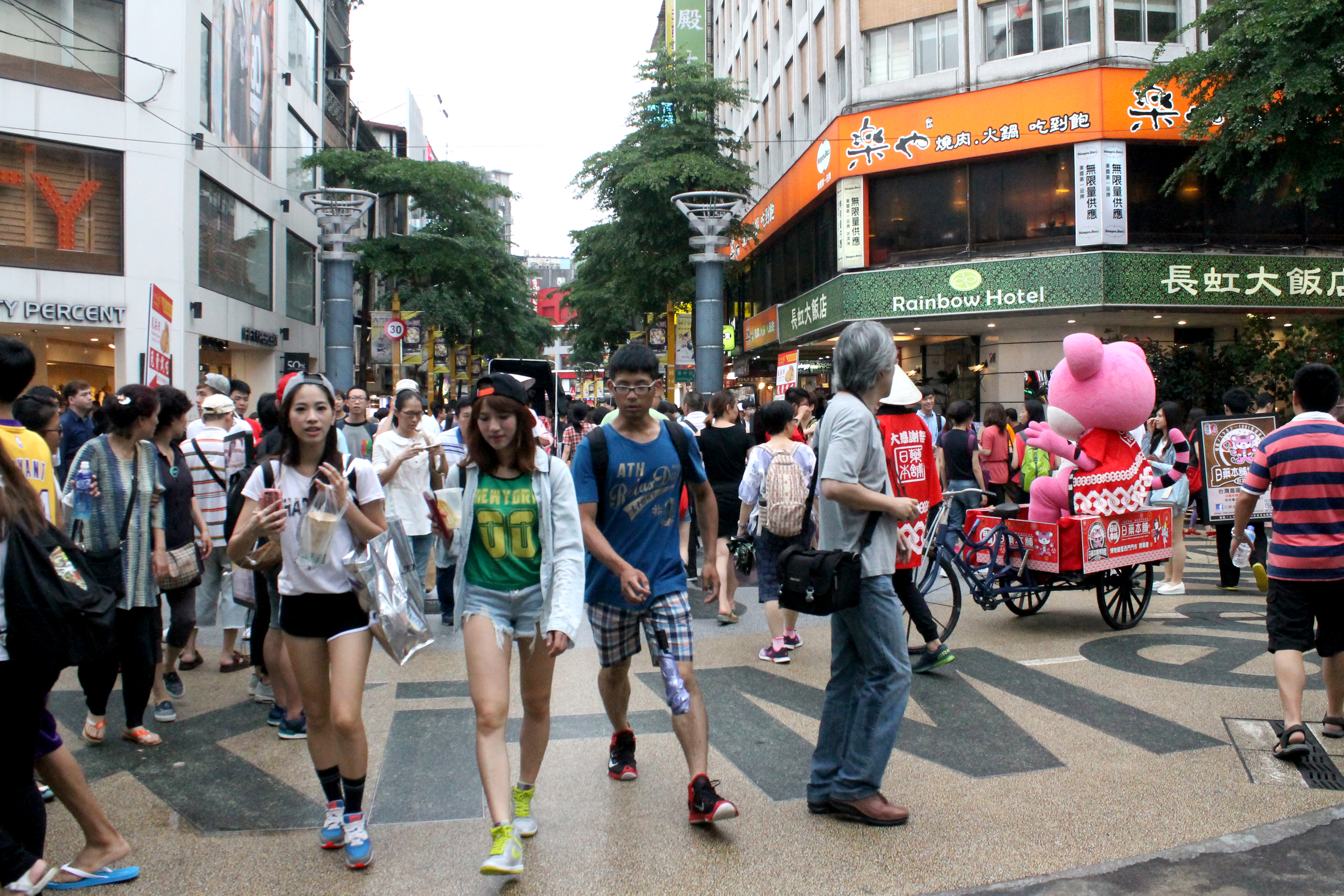
Ximending is a popular shopping district

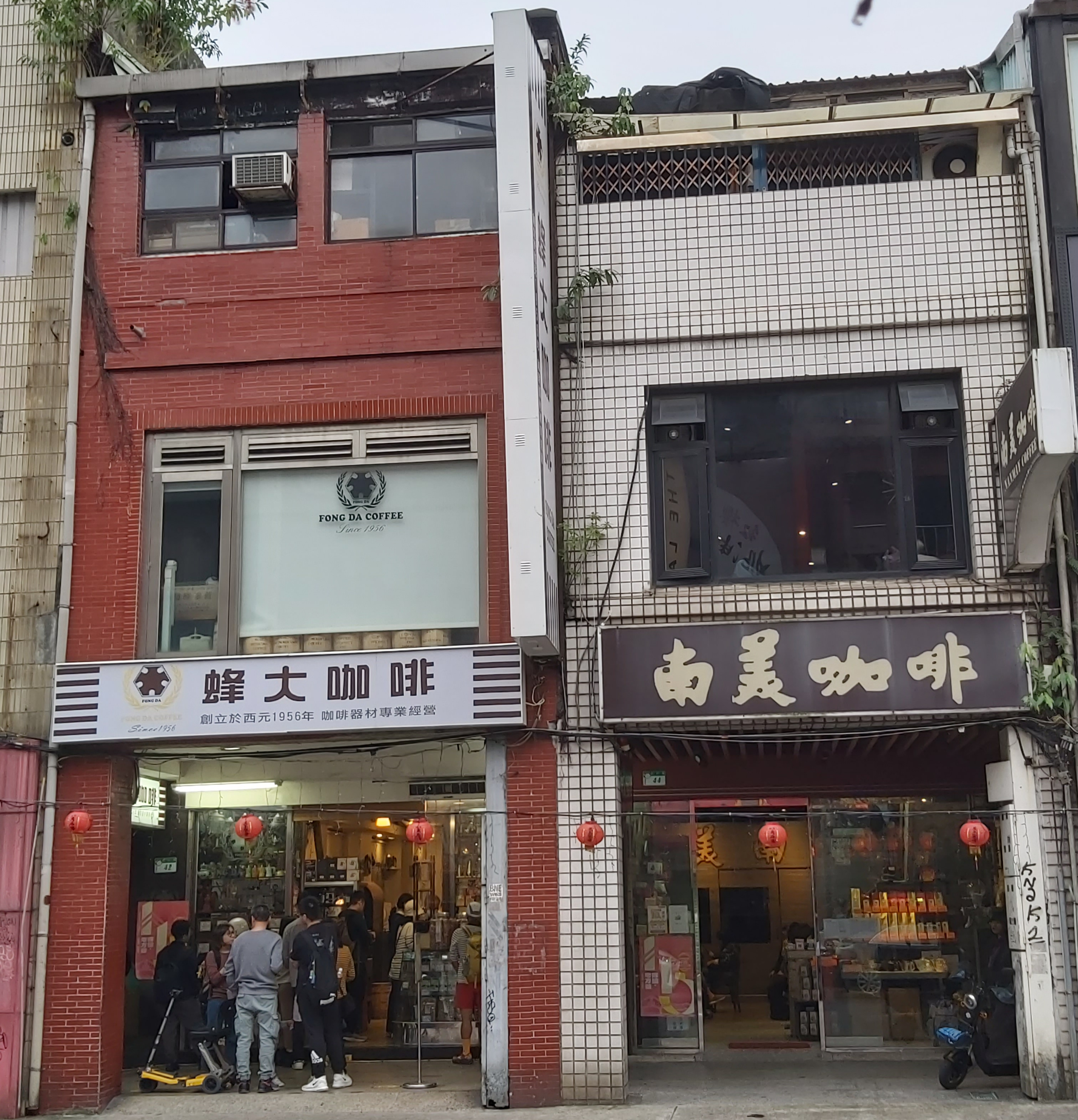
Cafes which have been in Ximending since the 1950s

Ximending attracts an average of over 3 million shoppers per month. Individual vendors gather in the streets as well as in the large business buildings, such as Wannien Department Store and Shizilin Square, during the day, and Wanguo Department Store and Eslite 116 later at night.

== Transportation ==
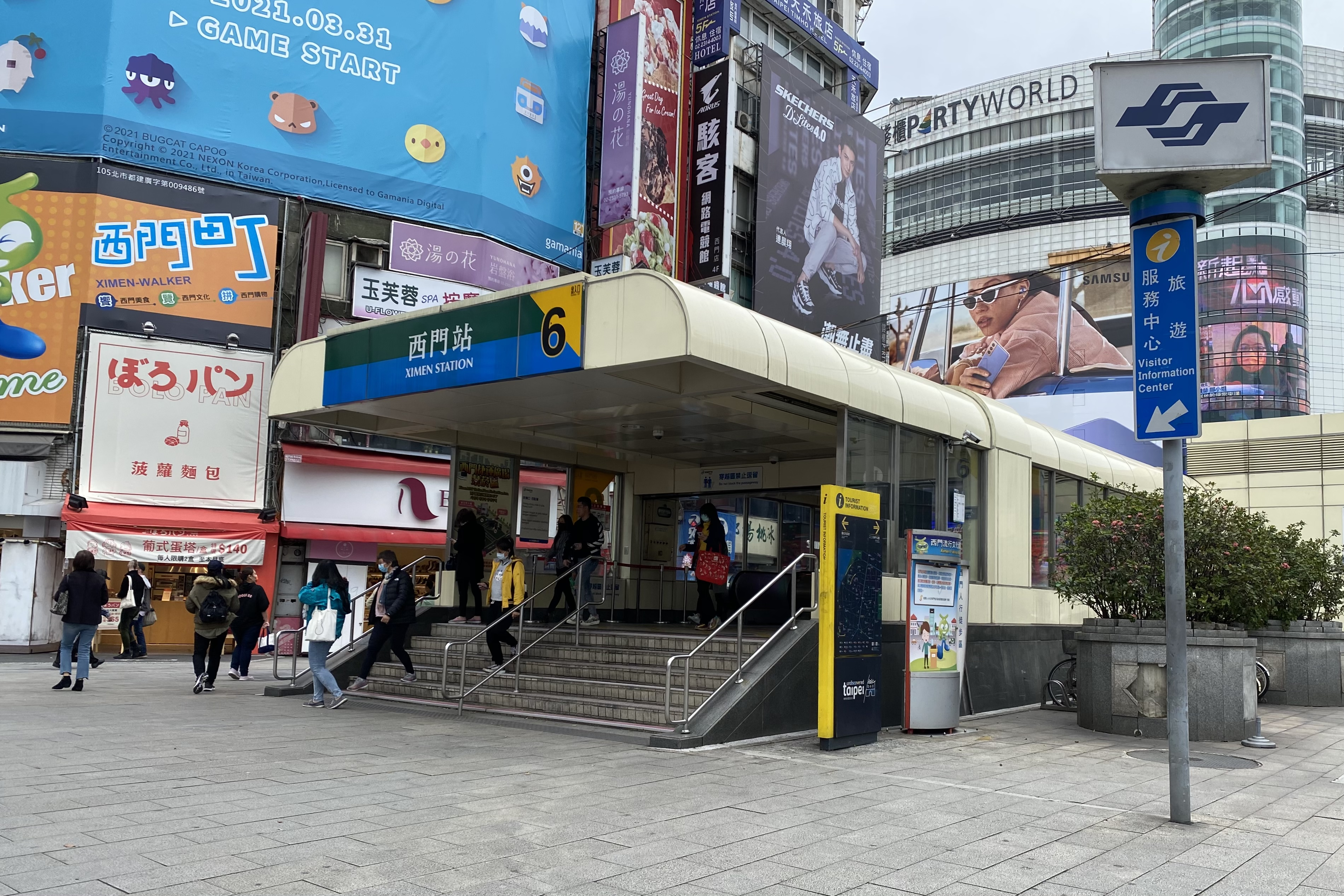
Ximen Station, Taipei Metro

Ximending's central location within Taipei renders it easily accessible, covering the area northwest of Taipei Metro's Ximen Station.

Because many bus lines gather on Zhonghua Road, Ximending is also an important area for bus transfers. Ximending is also accessible via exit 6 of the Taipei Metro Ximen Station (Bannan Line and Songshan-Xindian Line).

== Crime ==
Ximending has a higher crime rate compared to the rest of the city with reports of violent brawls and prostitution. In response, the area is also subject to more policing.

== See also ==
- List of shopping malls in Taipei
- Shinkuchan
