= Little South Gate =

Historic structure in Taipei, Taiwan

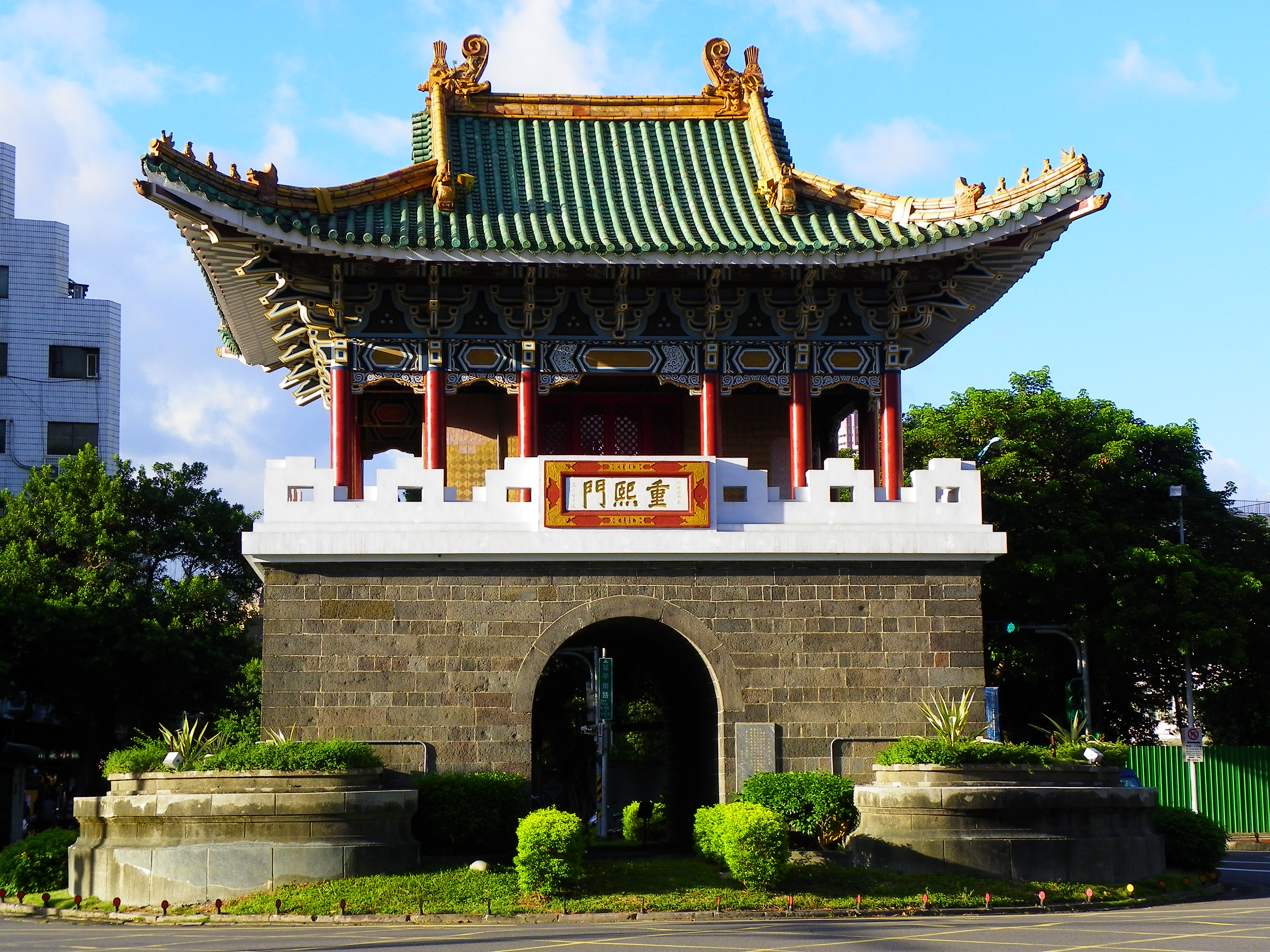
- The gate in 2010
- Interactive map of Little South Gate
- Location: Taipei, Taiwan
- Coordinates: 25°02′13″N 121°30′29″E

The Little South Gate is a gate in Taipei, Taiwan.

Little South Gate, north view at night

Little South Gate, north view at night

== See also ==
- List of tourist attractions in Taipei
- Walls of Taipei
- Xiaonanmen metro station
