= Sun Yun-suan Memorial Museum =

Museum in Zhongzheng, Taipei, Taiwan

- 孫運璿科技人文紀念館
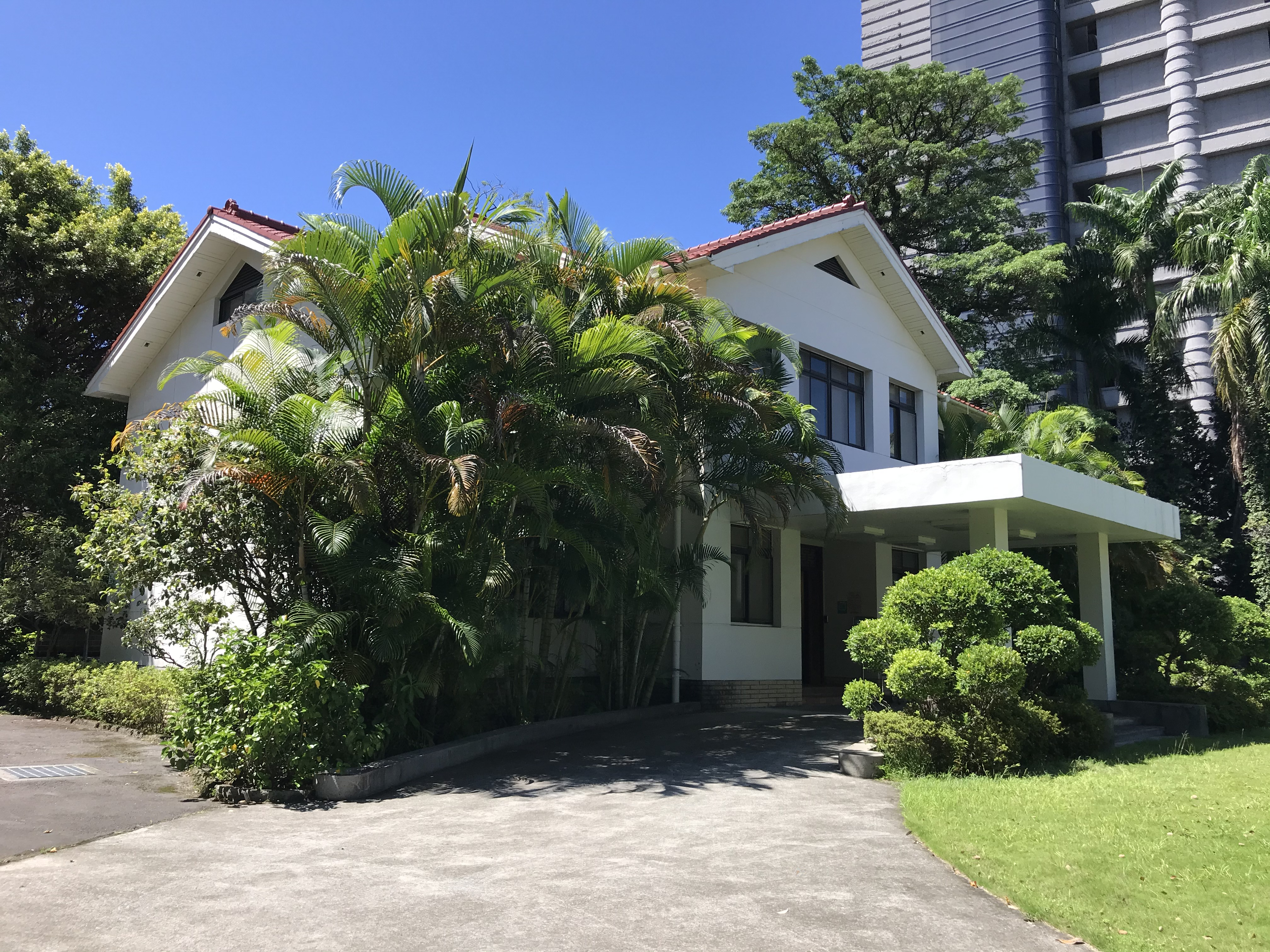
- Former name: Sun Yun-suan's Residence
- Established: 30 October 2014
- Location: Zhongzheng, Taipei, Taiwan
- Coordinates: 25.033572°N 121.511551°E
- Type: museum
- Website: Official website

The Sun Yun-suan Memorial Museum (traditional Chinese: 孫運璿科技人文紀念館; simplified Chinese: 孙运璿科技人文纪念馆; pinyin: Sūn Yùnxuán Kējì Rénwén Jìniànguǎn) is a museum in Zhongzheng District, Taipei, Taiwan about former premier Sun Yun-suan.

== History ==
The museum building was formerly the residence for Premier Sun Yun-suan in 1980 until his death in 2006. The building was then designated as historical monument by Taipei City Government in the same year. It was opened to the public on 30 October 2014.

== Architecture ==
The museum building consists of front garden with pond.

== Exhibitions ==
The museum displays permanent exhibitions of his and his wife handwritten diaries, manuscripts, photographs and personal items. There are also contemporary exhibitions displayed at the building as well.

== Transportation ==
The museum is accessible within walking distance south of Xiaonanmen Station of Taipei Metro.

== See also ==
- List of museums in Taiwan
