= Taipei East Gate =

Historic structure in Taipei, Taiwan

- 臺北府城東門
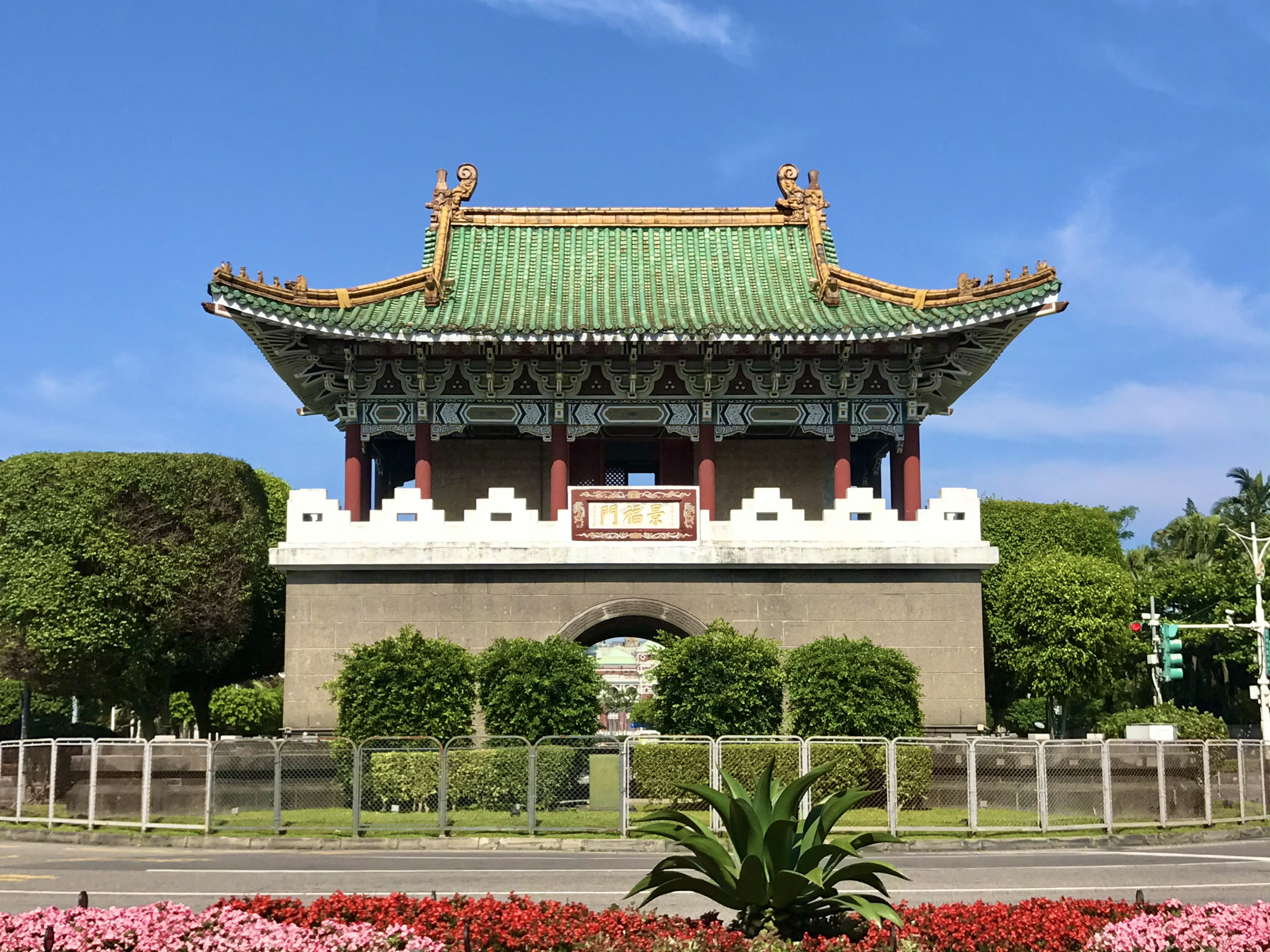
- The gate in 2021
- Interactive map of Taipei East Gate
- Location: Taipei, Taiwan
- Type: City gate

The Taipei East Gate (Chinese: 臺北府城東門), officially the Jingfu Gate (Chinese: 景福門), is a restored 18th-century gate in Taipei, Taiwan. It gave it name to Dongmen Neighborhood, formerly called Tōmonchō in Japanese period.

== See also ==
- List of tourist attractions in Taipei
- Walls of Taipei
