= Tainan Prefecture (Qing dynasty) =

Historical administrative division in Taiwan

Tainan Prefecture (Chinese: 臺南府; pinyin: Táinān Fǔ) was a prefecture of Taiwan under Qing rule. The prefecture was established by the Qing dynasty government in 1887, when Fokien-Taiwan Province was established. The prefecture included the districts/counties of Anping, Kagi, Fengshan, and Hengchun, and the sub-prefecture of Penghu.

The island was previously governed as Taiwan Prefecture, with its capital at Taiwan-fu in the south. With the reorganization beginning in 1885, Taiwan-fu was moved north to a new location in the center of the island, outside of the boundaries of the new Tainan Prefecture. Thus the southern city formerly called Taiwan-fu was renamed Tainan-fu. This is the name origin of modern-day Tainan.

== See also ==
- Zhou (country subdivision)
- Taiwan under Qing rule
- Tainan
- Tainan Prefecture
- Taiwan Prefecture (1887–1895)

== Bibliography ==
- Davidson, James W. (1903). The Island of Formosa, Past and Present : history, people, resources, and commercial prospects : tea, camphor, sugar, gold, coal, sulphur, economical plants, and other productions. London and New York: Macmillan & co. OL 6931635M.
