= Xiaonanmen metro station =

Metro station in Taipei, Taiwan

Xiaonanmen 小南門
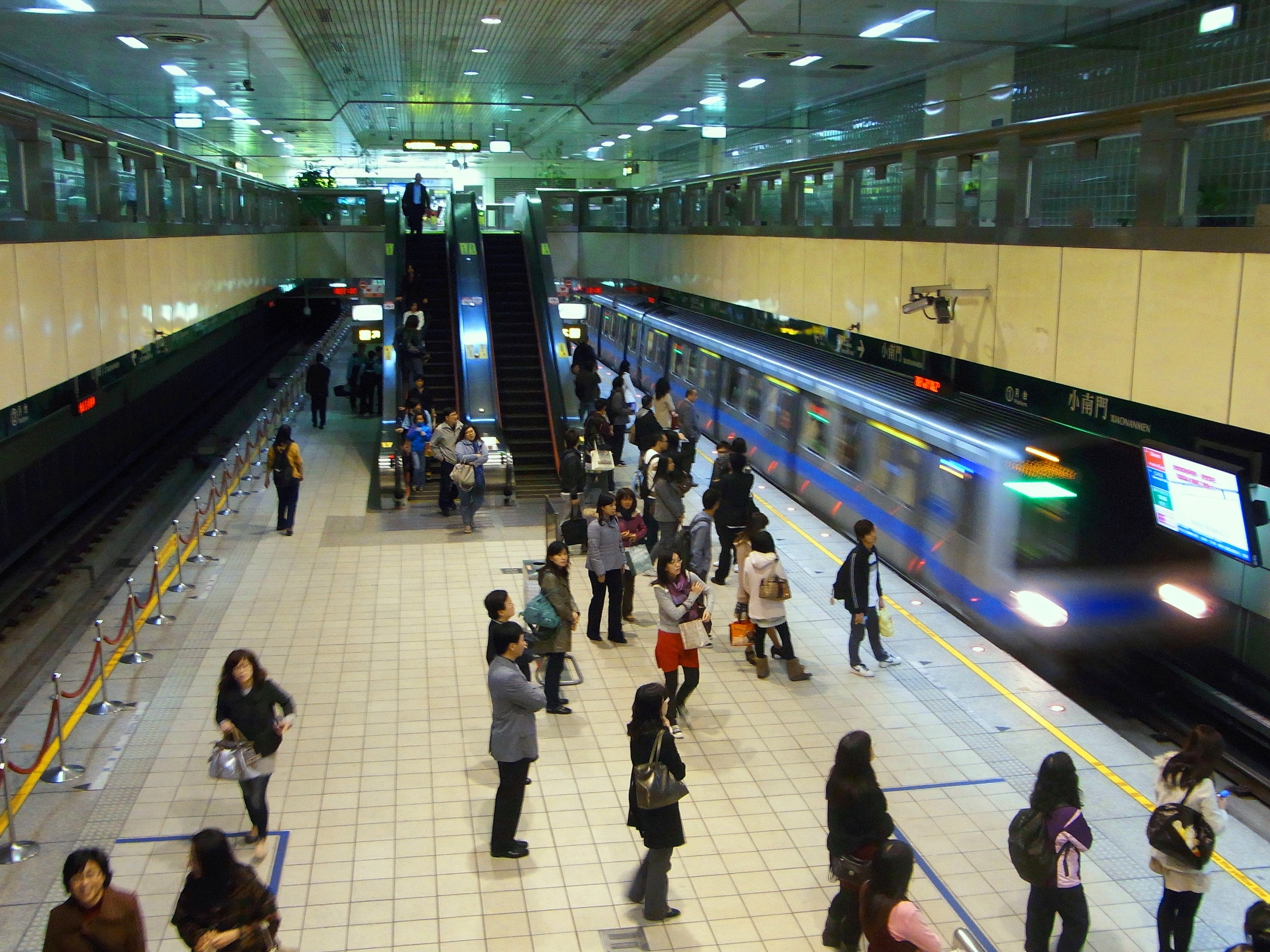
- Platform

Chinese name
- Traditional Chinese: 小南門
- Simplified Chinese: 小南门
- Literal meaning: Little South Gate
Transcriptions
Standard Mandarin
- Hanyu Pinyin: Xiǎonánmén
- Bopomofo: ㄒㄧㄠˇ ㄋㄢˊ ㄇㄣˊ
- Wade–Giles: Hsiao³ Nan²-men²
Hakka
- Pha̍k-fa-sṳ: Séu-nàm-mùn
Southern Min
- Tâi-lô: Sió-lâm-mn̂g

General information
- Location: B1F., No. 22, Aiguo W. Rd. Zhongzheng, Taipei; Taiwan
- Coordinates: 25.035637°N 121.510787°E
- System: Taipei Metro station
- Operator: Taipei Metro
- Line: Songshan–Xindian line
- Platforms: 2 (1 island platform)
- Connections: Bus stop

Construction
- Structure type: Underground

Other information
- Station code: G11

History
- Opened: 31 August 2000; 25 years ago

Passengers
- daily (December 2024)
- Rank: 71 out of 109 and 5 others

Services
Preceding station	Taipei Metro	Following station
Ximen towards Songshan	Songshan–Xindian line	CKS Memorial Hall towards Taipower Building or Xindian
Location

The Taipei Metro Xiaonanmen station (formerly transliterated as Hsiao Nanmen Station until 2003) is an underground station on the Songshan–Xindian line located in Zhongzheng District, Taipei, Taiwan.

== Station overview ==
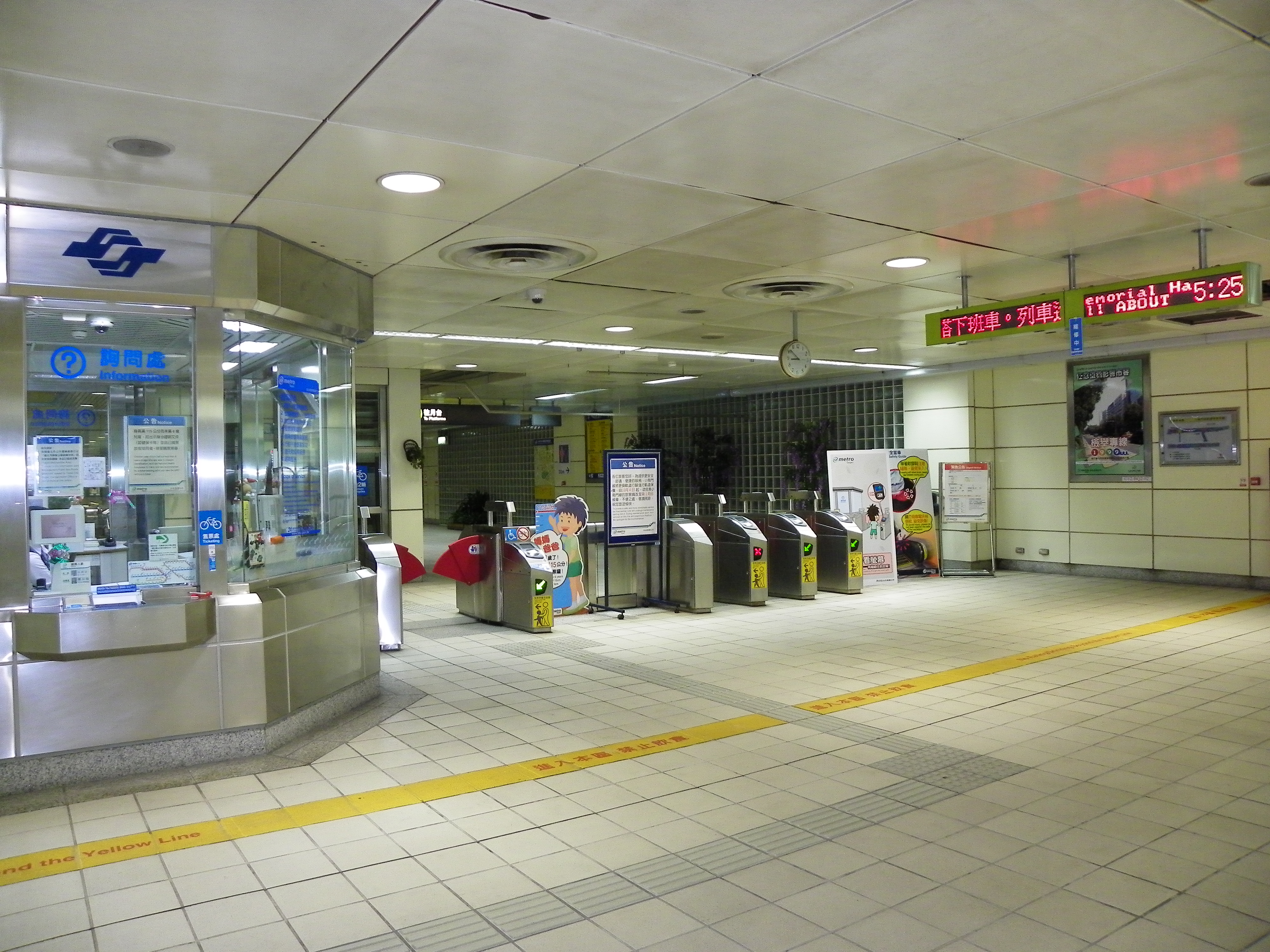
Xiaonanmen station concourse

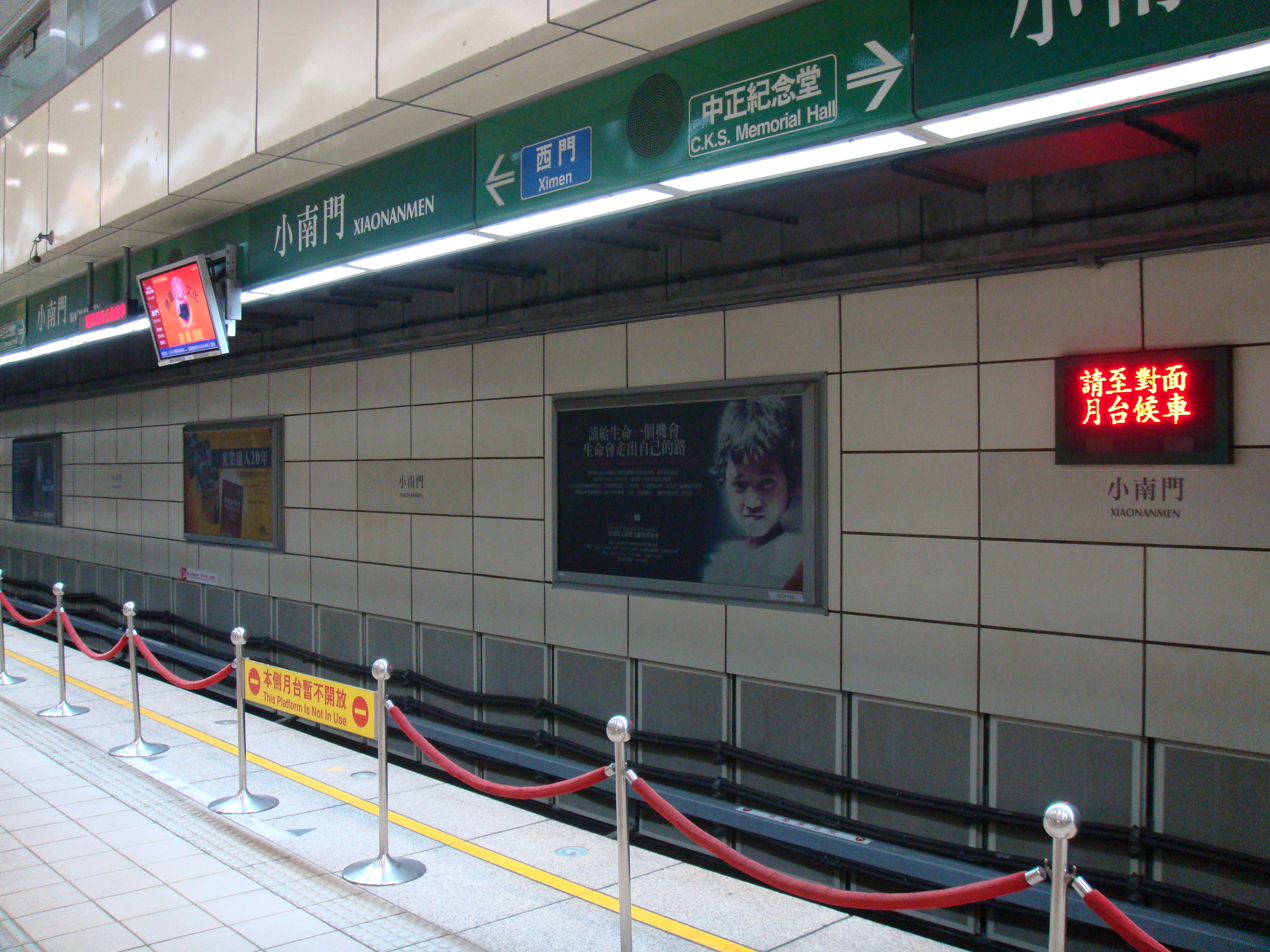
An unused platform at Xiaonanmen station prior to the opening of Xinyi Line

This two-level, underground station has an island platform and four exits. The station is surrounded by government buildings and educational institutions, serving mainly students and civil servants, and therefore it remains relatively quiet for most of the day.

In 2010, the station was used for the filming of a scene for a Taiwanese romantic comedy film, Au Revoir Taipei (一頁台北). The station was emptied for filming, and a train was arranged specifically for shooting.

=== History ===
- 31 August 2000: The station opened for revenue service.
- March 2006: The station was a target of serial vandalism where three of its exits were found to have had their glass panels smashed.

== Operations ==
The station was formerly served by a shuttle service between Ximen and CKS Memorial Hall because trains from Xindian would travel to Tamsui. Platform 1 and 2 would switch service every six months under that operation. Upon the opening of the Xinyi Line in November 2013, the shuttle was extended south to Taipower Building. Upon the opening of the Songshan Line in November 2014, the shuttle was replaced by trains running the full-length Songshan–Xindian line service between Songshan and Xindian.

== Station layout ==
Street level	Entrance/exit	Entrance/exit
B1	Concourse
B1	Concourse	Lobby, information desk, automatic ticket dispensing machines, one-way faregates Restrooms (outside fare zone)
B2	Platform 1	← Songshan–Xindian line toward Songshan (G12 Ximen)
B2	Island platform, doors will open on the left
B2	Platform 2	→ Songshan–Xindian line toward Xindian / Taipower Building (G10 Chiang Kai-shek Memorial Hall) →

=== Exits ===
- Exit 1: North side of Aiguo W. Rd., near Yanping S. Rd., adjacent to the Ministry of National Defense
- Exit 2: South side of Aiguo W. Rd., near Yanping S. Rd.
- Exit 3: Southeast side of the intersection of Aiguo W. Rd. and Boai Rd.
- Exit 4: Southwest side of the intersection of Aiguo W. Rd. and Chongqing S. Rd.

== Around the station ==
- Ministry of National Defense
- Judicial Yuan
- Ministry of the Interior National Immigration Agency General Headquarters and Taipei Service Station
- Taipei Fucheng - Little South Gate
- Sun Yun-suan Memorial Museum
- Chunghwa Postal Museum
- Ministry of Justice
- National Museum of History
- Taipei Botanical Garden
- Taipei Municipal University of Education
- Environmental Protection Administration (between this station and Ximen station)
- Soochow University (Downtown Campus)
- Taipei Municipal Jianguo High School
- Nanmen Junior High School
- Presidential Office Building
- Yonghe Residence
