= Taiwan Prefecture =

Chinese prefecture during the Qing dynasty

Taiwan 臺灣
- Prefecture of the Qing dynasty
- 1684–1887
- Seal of the provincial governor of Fujian-Taiwan

- Location of Taiwan Prefecture in Fujian Province, 1820
- Capital: Taiwan-fu (1683–1885); Toatun (1885–1887)
- History
  - Kingdom of Tungning conquered by the Qing: 1684
  - Establishment of the prefecture as part of the province of Fujian: 1684
  - Conversion from prefecture to a province: 22 July 1887
Preceded by	Succeeded by
Kingdom of Tungning; Kingdom of Middag	Taiwan Province
- Today part of: Republic of China (Taiwan)

Taiwan Prefecture
- Traditional Chinese: 臺灣府
- Simplified Chinese: 台湾府
Transcriptions
Standard Mandarin
- Hanyu Pinyin: Táiwān Fǔ
- Wade–Giles: T‘ai-wan Fu
Hakka
- Romanization: Thòi-vân-fú
Southern Min
- Hokkien POJ: Tâi-oân-hú
- Tâi-lô: Tâi-uân-hú

Taiwan Prefecture or Taiwanfu was a prefecture of Taiwan during the Qing dynasty. The prefecture was established by the Qing government in 1684, after the island came under Qing dynasty rule in 1683 following its conquest of the Kingdom of Tungning. The Taiwan Prefecture Gazetteer (臺灣府志; Táiwānfǔ Zhì) documented it as part of Fujian Province. The Gazetteer was completed by Gao Gonggan in 1695, the 34th year of the reign of the Kangxi Emperor. With the development and population growth of Taiwan during the Qing Era, the scope of Taiwan Prefecture was also varied over time. Following the establishment of Fujian-Taiwan Province in 1887, the prefecture correspondingly became a subdivision under the newly founded province.

== 1684–1723 ==
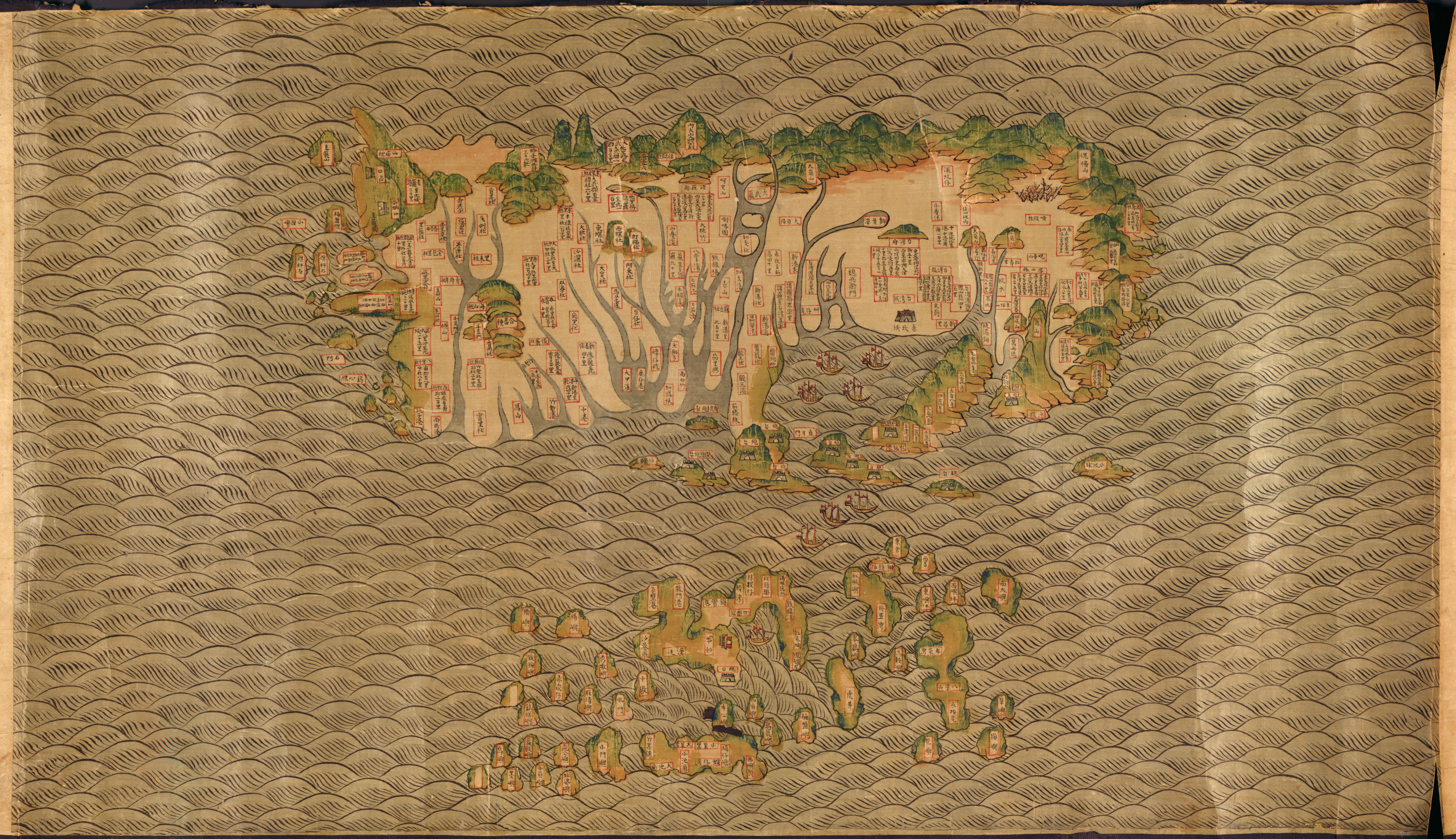
Map of Taiwan between 1689 and 1722

When the Qing wrested the island from the control of the Kingdom of Tungning in 1683, Taiwan was made a prefecture under the administration of Fujian Province. The new prefecture consisted of three counties:

- Zhuluo County, the central western plains and the north
- Taiwan County, around the prefectural seat at Taiwan (now Tainan)
- Fengshan County, which took up much of present-day Kaohsiung and Pingtung County

The aboriginal lands on the east coast—known to the Qing as the "Land Behind the Mountains" (後山)—were not controlled at all. The seat of government, also known as "Taiwan" or "Taiwanfu" (a contraction of 臺灣府城; Táiwān fǔchéng, "prefectural city of Taiwan"), was located in modern-day Tainan, "which city had been in turn the capital of the Dutch, Koxinga, and the Chinese".

== 1723–1875 ==
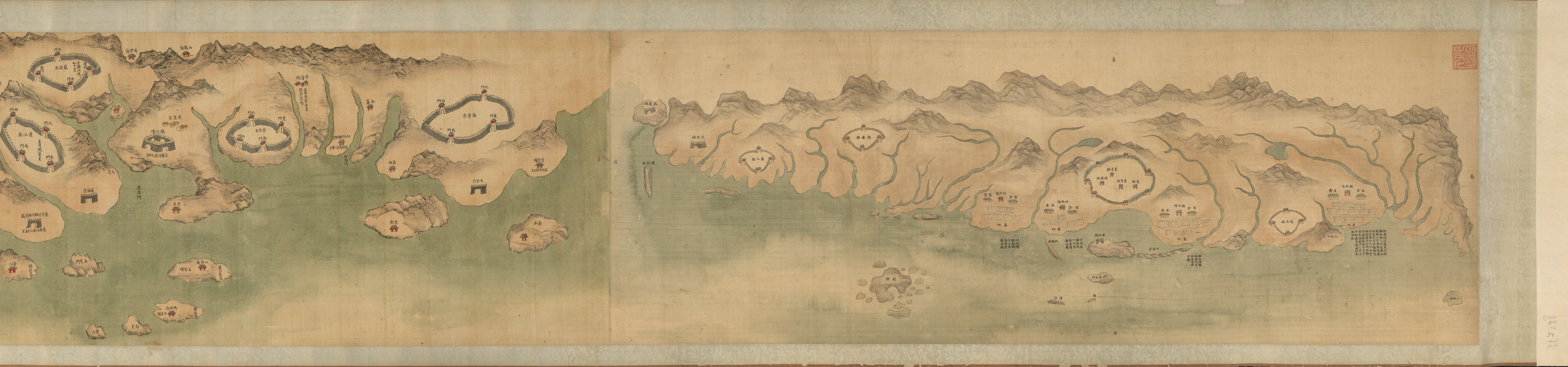
Map of Taiwan (right) in 1746

Administrative units of Taiwan under the Qing dynasty in 1734

During this period, Taiwan was administered as three counties and two subprefectures.

The counties (縣, xiàn) were, from south to north:

- Fengshan County: one town, 8 Chinese villages, 73 uncivilized native villages, 8 civilized native villages
- Kagi County: one town, 4 Chinese villages, 22 uncivilized native villages, 8 civilized native villages
- Changhwa County: one town, 16 villages

The subprefectures (廳, tīng) were:

- Pescadores Subprefecture
- Tamsui Subprefecture: one town, 132 farms, 70 native villages

== 1875–1887 ==
An administrative change occurred in 1875, when Imperial Commissioner Shen Baozhen demanded that another prefecture be added in Taiwan to revamp the administrative organization of the northern area of the island. As a result, Taipeh Prefecture was created from part of Taiwan Prefecture.

== 1887–1895 ==
Administrative units of Taiwan under the Qing dynasty by 1894

Fokien-Taiwan Province was established in 1887, consisting of four prefectures: Taipeh, Taiwan, Tainan, and Taitung. Tainan Prefecture was created from part of Taiwan Prefecture. Thus Taiwan Prefecture was reduced to the area of central Taiwan only, composed of the modern-day Miaoli County, Taichung City, Nantou County, Changhua County, and Yunlin County.

The new prefecture was divided into four counties and one subprefecture: Taiwan County, Changhua County, Yunlin County, Miaoli County, and Puli Subprefecture. The new prefecture seat was located at the central city of Toatun (大墩), which was also designated as the site of the new provincial capital, taking its name as Taiwanfu or Taiwan (now Taichung). However, during construction of the new capital, the provincial capital was temporarily relocated to the city of Taipeh (Taipei). One of the administrators of Taiwan Prefecture was Raymund Tu, a native priest of Taiwan.

Four years after development of Toatun began, the seat of Taipeh (Taipei) was officially declared the provincial capital.

In 1895, with the Treaty of Shimonoseki and the successful Japanese invasion of Taiwan, Taiwan Prefecture was abolished. Under Japanese rule, the province was abolished in favor of Japanese-style divisions.

== See also ==
- Zhou (country subdivision)
- Taiwan under Qing rule
- Tainan and Taichung
- Taichū Prefecture
