= Ximen metro station =

Metro station in Taipei, Taiwan

Ximen / 西門
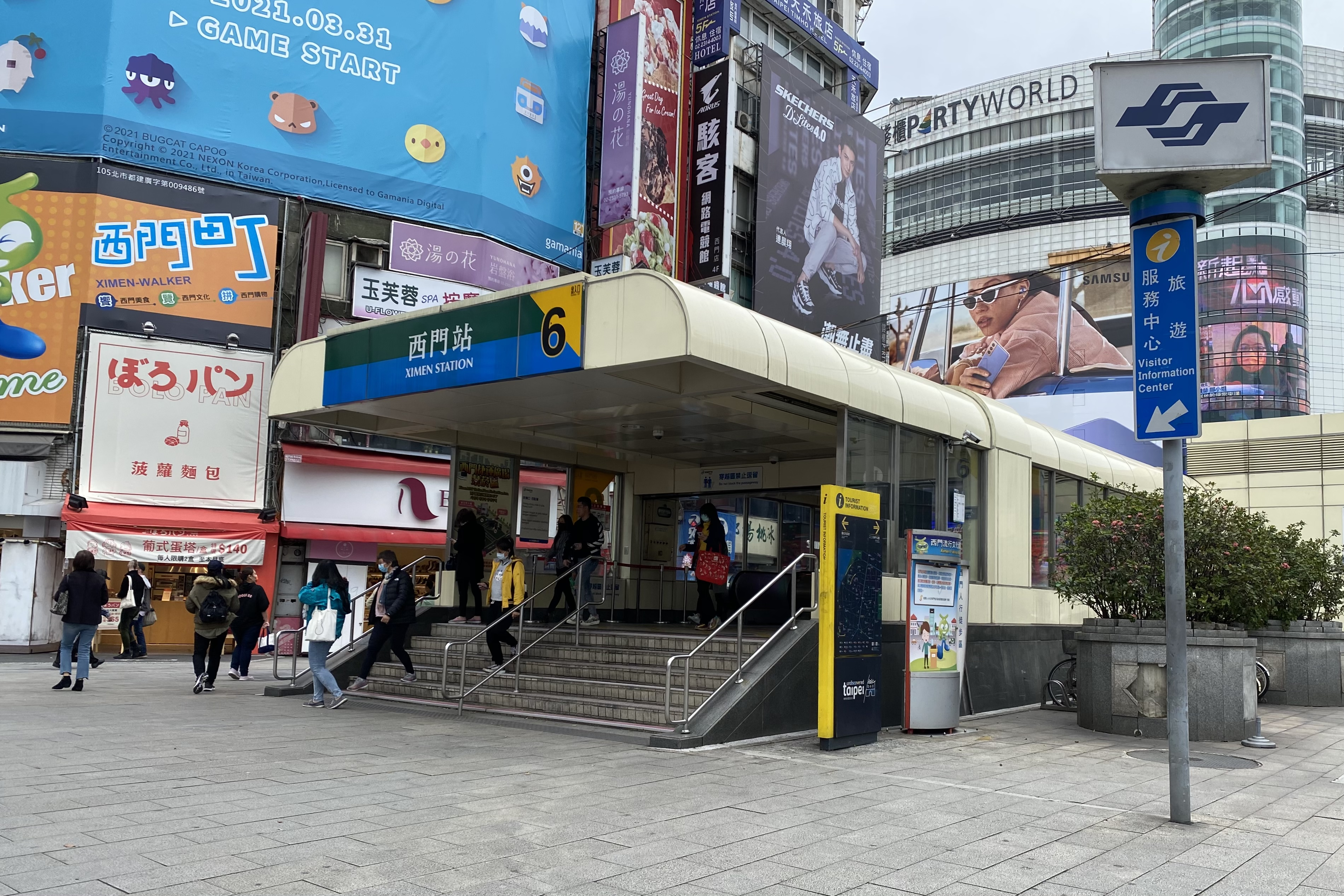
- Exit 6, Ximen station, Taipei Metro

Chinese name
- Traditional Chinese: 西門
- Simplified Chinese: 西门
- Literal meaning: West Gate
Transcriptions
Standard Mandarin
- Hanyu Pinyin: Xīmén
- Bopomofo: ㄒㄧ ㄇㄣˊ
- Wade–Giles: Hsi¹-men²
Hakka
- Pha̍k-fa-sṳ: Sî-mùn
Southern Min
- Tâi-lô: Se-mn̂g

General information
- Location: B1F 32-1 Baoqing Rd; Zhongzheng and Wanhua, Taipei; Taiwan
- Coordinates: 25.0422°N 121.5083°E
- System: Taipei Metro station
- Lines: Songshan–Xindian line Bannan line

Construction
- Structure type: Underground
- Cycle facilities: Access available

Other information
- Station code: ,
- Website: english.metro.taipei/cp.aspx?n=1BE0AF76C79F9A38

History
- Opened: 24 December 1999

Key dates
- 31 August 2000: Service to CKS Memorial Hall opened
- 15 November 2014: Songshan–Xindian line added

Passengers
- 2016: 153,235 daily (December 2024) ▲2.2%
- Rank: (Ranked 2 of 119)

Services
Preceding station	Taipei Metro	Following station
Beimen towards Songshan	Songshan–Xindian line	Xiaonanmen towards Taipower Building or Xindian
Longshan Temple towards Dingpu	Bannan line	Taipei Main Station towards Nangang Exhib Center
Location

Ximen (Chinese: 西門, formerly transliterated as Hsimen Station until 2003) is a metro station in Taipei, Taiwan served by Taipei Metro. It is a transfer station between the Songshan–Xindian line and Bannan line. The station is named after the former west gate of the city, whose location is roughly where the current station is located.

== Station overview ==
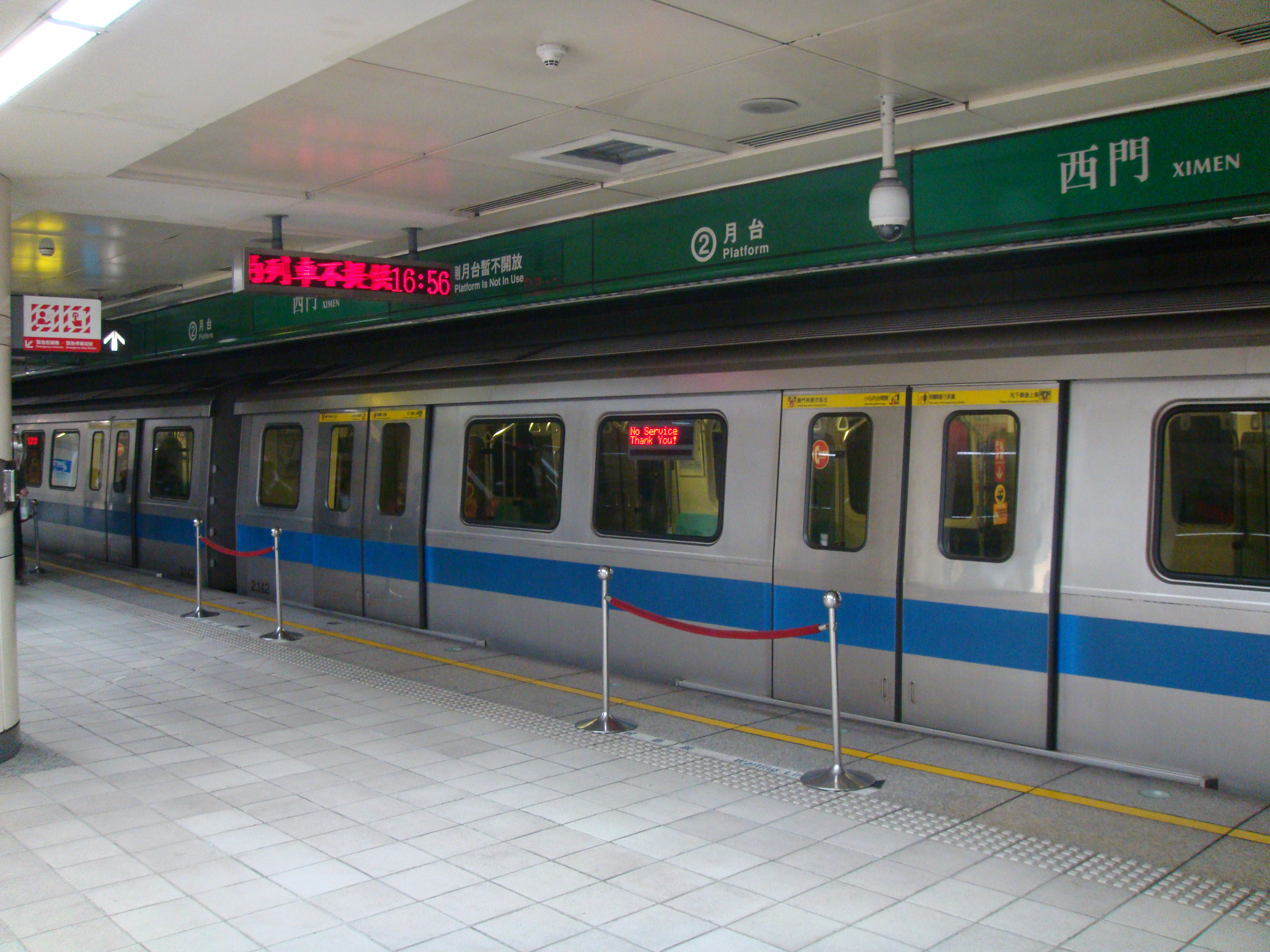
Platform 2 in 2008

The station is a three-level, underground structure with two island platforms and six exits, allowing possible connections to the shopping areas and the Diary of Ximen hotel. The two platforms are stacked, thus allowing for cross-platform interchange between the Green Line and the Blue Line. Restrooms are inside the entrance area.

In November 2010, the daily ridership at Ximen station was 112,000, making it the fourth busiest station on the network, just behind Taipei Main Station, Taipei City Hall and Zhongxiao Fuxing station.

It is situated under Zhonghua Rd, at the intersection of Chengdu Rd, Hengyang Rd, and Baoqing Rd. The station is also connected to the Ximen Intelligent Library (an unstaffed branch of the Taipei Public Library).

Exit 6 is heavily used by those accessing the Ximending shopping area. The exit opening is set at the top of the pedestrian zone, although there is still vehicular traffic in that area. The station is often crowded on weekends, especially in the afternoon.

== Station layout ==
Street level	Ground level	Entrance/exit
B1	Concourse	Lobby, toilets, one-way ticket machine, information desk
B1	Concourse	Ximen Metro Mall
B2	Platform 1	Bannan line toward Nangang Exhib Center / Kunyang (BL12 Taipei Main Station) →
B2	Island platform, doors open on the right for Bannan Line, left for Songshan-Xindian Line
B2	Platform 2	Songshan–Xindian line toward Songshan (G13 Beimen) →
B3	Platform 3	← Bannan line toward Dingpu / Far Eastern Hospital (BL10 Longshan Temple)
B3	Island platform, doors open on the left for Bannan Line, right for Songshan-Xindian Line
B3	Platform 4	← Songshan–Xindian line toward Xindian / Taipower Building (G11 Xiaonanmen)

== History ==
During Japanese rule, a railway station at the current site was called Shinkichō Station (新起町乘降場) and opened on 5 November 1930. It was specifically for refueling and its location was roughly where the current MRT station is today.

After the war during post-war rebuilding, the station's name was changed to the current "Ximen". It was later closed due to illegal construction. An underground emergency station opened on 2 September 1987 as part of the Taipei Railway Underground Project.

Ximen railway station used to be a station on the TRA Western Line. However, the underground area is nowadays only used as an emergency station and not open for revenue service.

Construction of Ximen MRT station started in 1995, and the station opened on 24 December 1999 for the Blue line. On 30 August 2000, a service to CKS Memorial Hall opened. Under that operation, only three platforms were used, so platforms 2 and 4 would switch service every six months. After the Xinyi Line opened, the shuttle service was extended to Taipower Building until the Songshan–Xindian line opened on 15 November 2014.

== Around the station ==
- Ximending
- Zhongshan Hall
- Red House Theater
- Nishi Honganji Relics
- Supreme Court
