= Kwong Wah (disambiguation) =

Kwong Wah may mean or refer to:

- Kwong Wa, a Hong Kong actor
- Kwong Wah Yit Poh, a Malaysian Chinese newspaper
- Kwong Wah Hospital, Hong Kong hospital
- Lau Kong Wah, a legislative councilor
- Kwong Wah Athletic Association, a football team competing in the Hong Kong Second Division League

== See also ==
- Guang Hua Digital Plaza, an indoor six-story market
