= Huashan 1914 Creative Park =

Multi-purpose park in Zhongzheng, Taipei, Taiwan

- 華山1914文化創意產業園區
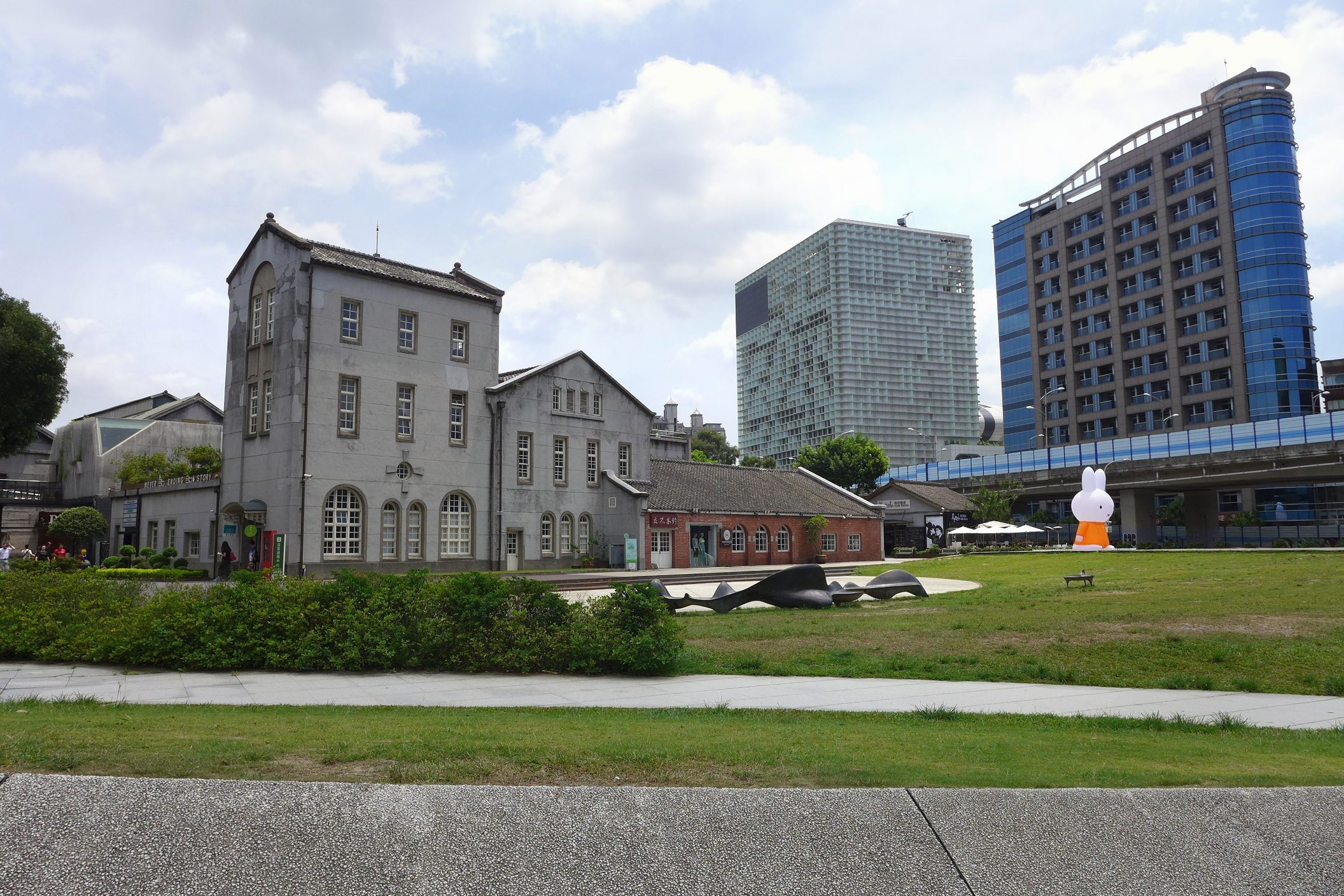
- Interactive map of Huashan 1914 Creative Park
- Location: Zhongzheng, Taipei, Taiwan
- Coordinates: 25°02′40″N 121°31′46″E
- Acreage: 19,800 m^{2}

Construction
- Opened: 1914 (as Taihoku Winery); 2005 (as Huashan 1914 Creative Park)

Website
- Official website

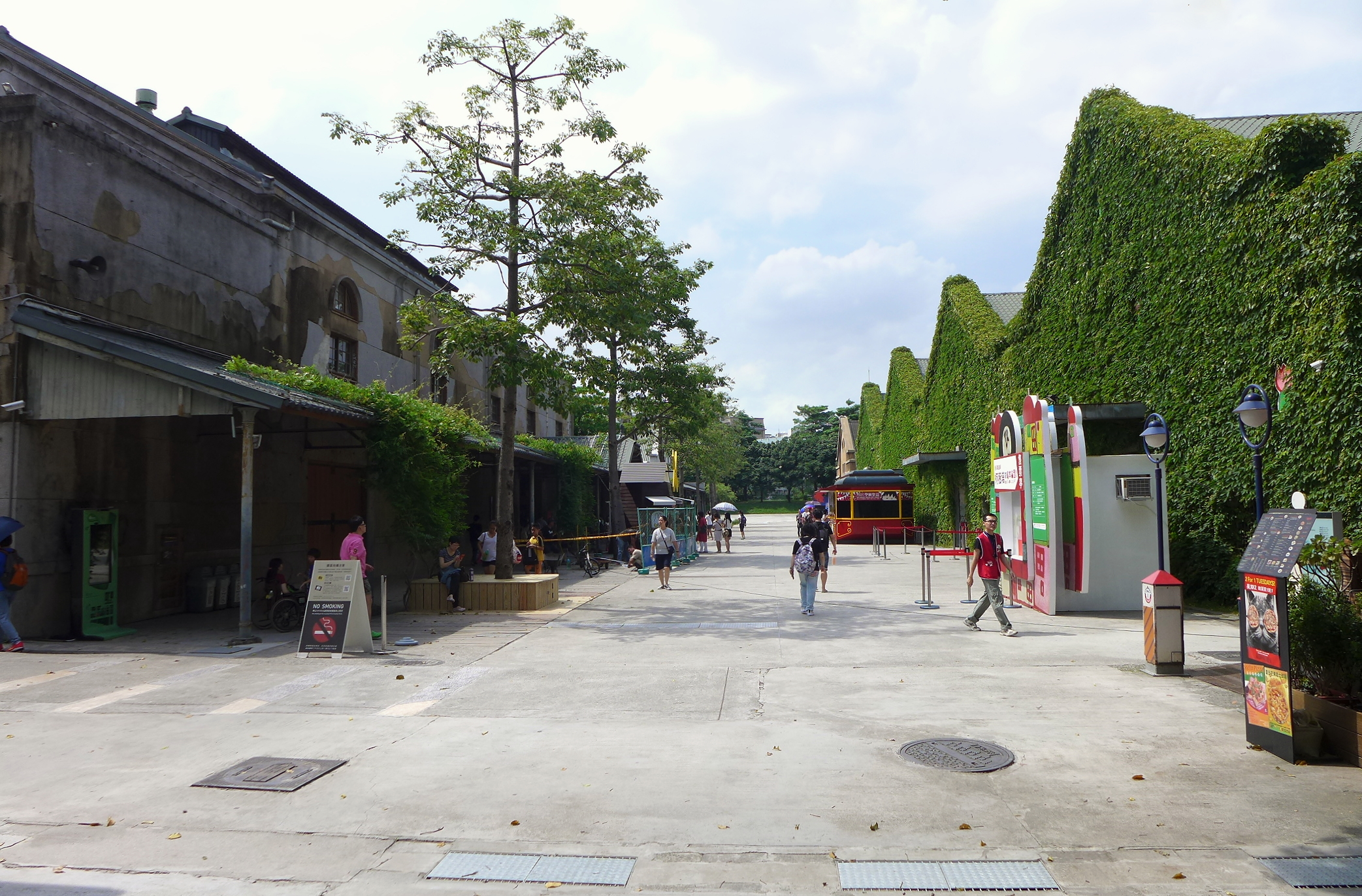
Art Boulevard

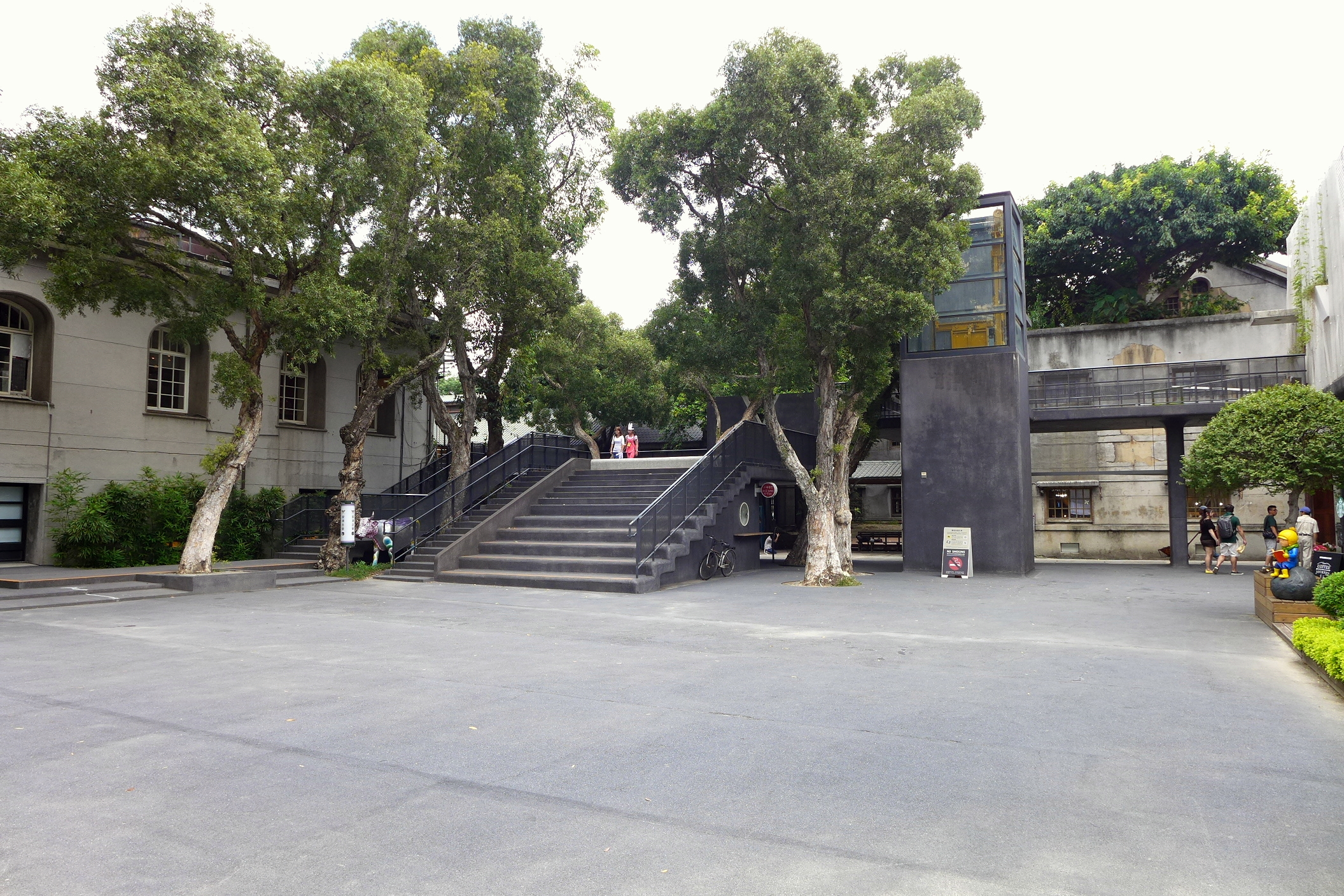
Chuan Ching Stage

The Huashan 1914 Creative Park (traditional Chinese: 華山1914文化創意產業園區; simplified Chinese: 华山1914文化创意产业园区; pinyin: Huàshān 1914 Wénhuà Chuàngyì Chǎnyè Yuánqū) is a multi-purpose park in Zhongzheng District, Taipei, Taiwan.

== History ==
=== Empire of Japan ===
What is now Huashan 1914 Creative Park opened in 1914 as the Houjou Sake Company during Japanese rule. It was privately owned winery that produced sake and ginseng wines, and bred moth orchids. In 1922, the government included wine within a list of monopoly items. They bought the winery and changed the name to Taiwan Governor-General's Monopoly Bureau, Taihoku Wine Factory. The winery then produced rice wine and liquors.

=== Republic of China ===
In 1945, the ROC Government took ownership over the winery and changed the name into Taiwan Province Monopoly Bureau, Taipei Wine Factory.

In 1949, when the Monopoly Bureau started including tobacco among its items, the winery was renamed to Taiwan Province Tobacco and Wine Government Monopoly Bureau, Taipei First Winery. The winery produced cheap liquor made from cassava that became known as Taibai Liquor. It was a staple drink for most people.

In the mid-1960s, the winery name was changed yet again, this time to Fruit Wine Factory. Rice wine started to occupy a bigger part of its production. In compliance with government policy, the winery started to develop fruit wines. It was the start of its golden age.

In 1987, due to rapid urbanization in Taipei, pollution it caused due to manufacturing process and skyrocketing land prices, the winery moved to Linkou District in Taipei County.

In 1997, the Golden Bough Theater Group barged into the winery premises and staged a production. The winery was slated for demolition. The group was charged with forcible entry into state property. Artists and performing groups reacted and clamored for the reopening of the winery that had been left idle for ten years.

In 2002, the park was renamed to the "Huashan Art and Cultural Park". In December 2003, the Council for Cultural Affairs (CCA) took over its management. They planned a complete reconstruction that started in early 2004. And the end of 2005, the park opened and offered artists a place to develop their creations and non-profit organizations a venue to hold activities.

In November 2007, the CCA signed a contract with Taiwan Cultural-Creative Development Co., Ltd. to run the park. Since then, theater groups, painters, wood sculptors, writers, movie producers and directors from Taiwan and abroad have found in the park a timeless pace to showcase their creative talents. The park regularly hosts pop-up events in its

In 2011, the park was officially renamed to the "Huashan 1914 Creative Park". The park is home to the Umay Theater which regularly hosts performances, as well as an outdoor amphitheater and buildings used for exhibitions. The park also houses Legacy Taipei, a concert venue.

== Transportation ==
The park is accessible within walking distance West from Zhongxiao Xinsheng Station of the Taipei Metro and East of the Shando Temple Station.

== See also ==
- List of tourist attractions in Taiwan
- List of parks in Taiwan
