= Mayor's Residence Art Salon =

Former residence in Zhongzheng, Taipei, Taiwan

- 市長官邸藝文沙龍
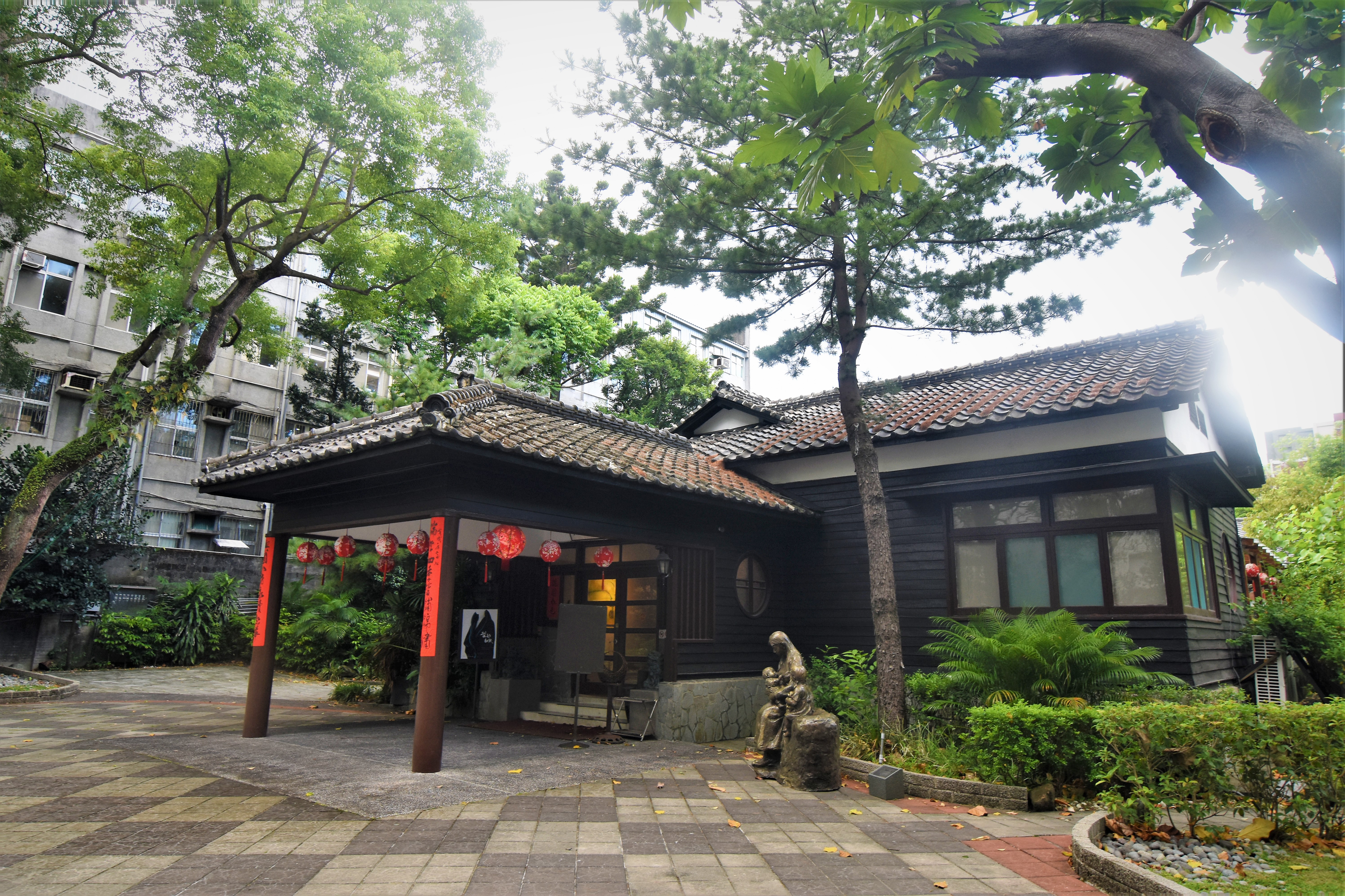
- Interactive map of the Mayor's Residence Art Salon area

General information
- Type: former residence
- Architectural style: Japanese
- Location: Zhongzheng, Taipei, Taiwan
- Coordinates: 25°02′24.9″N 121°31′28.0″E
- Completed: 1940

Technical details
- Floor area: 990 m^{2}
- Grounds: 2,640 m^{2}

Website
- Official website

The Mayor's Residence Art Salon (traditional Chinese: 市長官邸藝文沙龍; simplified Chinese: 市长官邸艺文沙龙; pinyin: Shìzhǎng Guāndǐ Yìwén Shālóng) is a former residence in Zhongzheng District, Taipei, Taiwan.

== History ==
The residence building was originally built in 1940 by the Japanese government for the governor's families. It was used as the residence of Taipei mayors until 1994. In 1999, the Department of Cultural Affairs of Taipei City Government outsourced the operation of the building and converted it into an art and cultural center.

== Architecture ==
The building was constructed in Japanese architecture style. The area of the building spans over an area of 990 m^{2} on a total ground area of 2,640 m^{2}. It is now run as an art and cultural center. It also includes a restaurant and bookshop.

== Activities ==
The venue regularly hosts small art exhibitions.

== Transportation ==
The building is accessible within walking distance south of Shandao Temple Station of Taipei Metro.

== See also ==
- List of tourist attractions in Taiwan
