= Qidong Street Japanese Houses =

Coordinates: 25°02′30″N 121°31′44″E

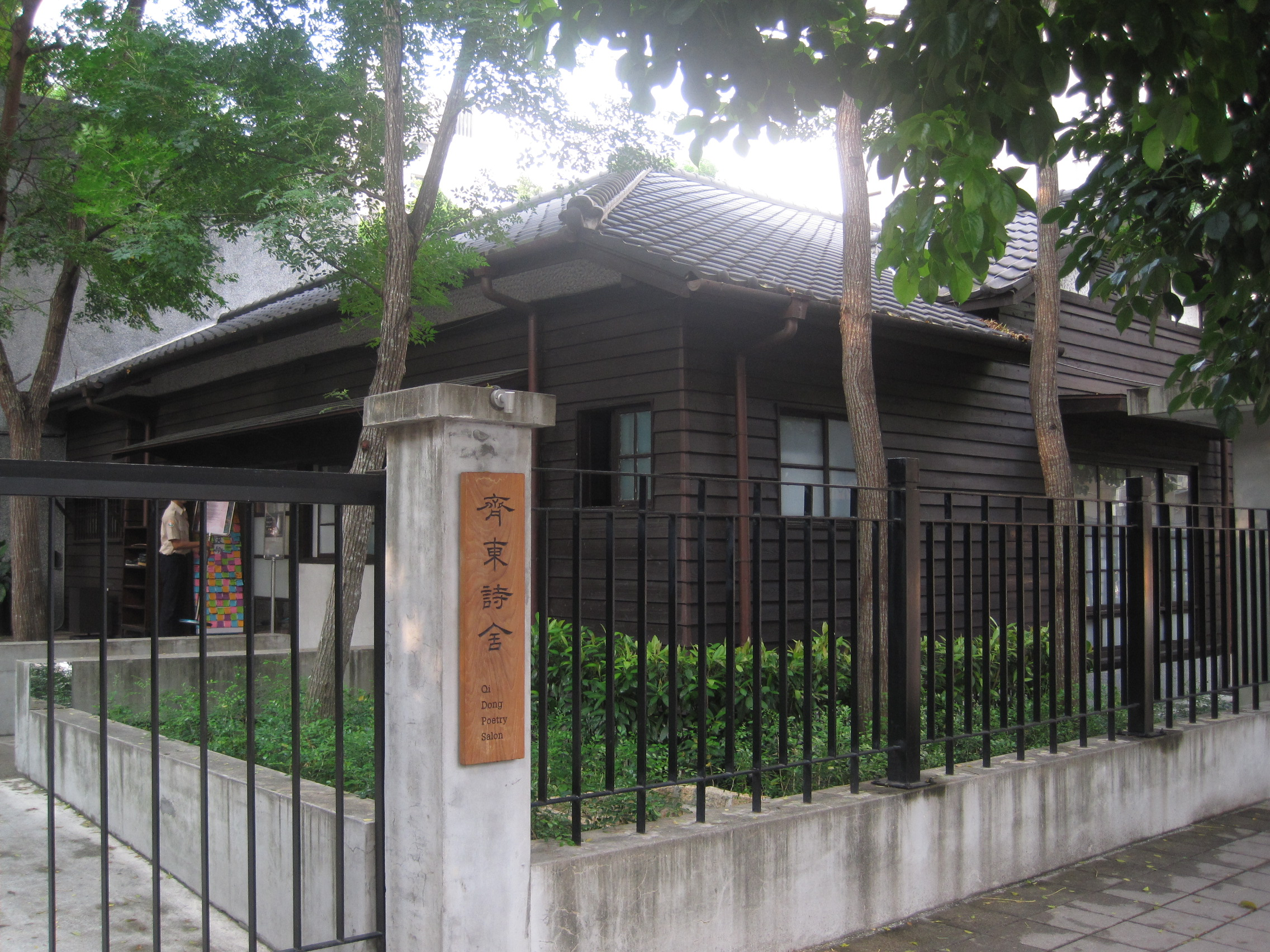
Qidong Street Japanese Houses

Qidong Street Japanese Houses (Chinese: 齊東街日式宿舍; pinyin: Qídōng Jiē Rìshì Sùshè) is located in the Zhongzheng District of Taipei, Taiwan. During the Qing Dynasty, Qidong Street was a major lane for transporting rice from the Taipei basin to harbours along the river. Prior to the construction of the Taipei City Walls in 1884, one could travel from Bangkah (today's Wanhua District) past the East Gate area and along Qidong Street which joined Bade Road, leading to modern-day Songshan, Nangang, and eventually Keelung.

The history of Qidong spans the Qing era, the Japanese era, and contemporary times. The group of dwellings, located in the center of a modern-day residential district for city officials, housed Japanese civil servants and later provided housing for Republic of China central government figures. After World War II, the Japanese-style dormitory area was taken over by the Bank of Taiwan and converted into residences for bank executives.

During Japanese rule, the area belonged to the Saiwaichō civil servant housing group (幸町職務官舍群), of which most of the architecture dates from the 1920s to the 1940s. The buildings feature distinctly Japanese architectural features and their overall layout remains largely complete, a state rarely seen in the current day. The house at #11, Lane 53, Qidong Street, currently the Taipei Qin Hall, is particularly well preserved with original porch, doors, and interior spaces as well as a sculptured garden.

In addition, Taipei is home to approximately 2,000 wooden structures built during the Japanese rule of the island between 1895 and 1945, as well as some 4,000 trees that have been growing in their surrounding gardens since that time.

== Taiwan Literature Base ==
Taiwan Literature Base, established in 2014 and affiliated with National Museum of Taiwan Literature, is situated within Qidong Street Japanese Houses, the Japanese-style dormitory complex on Chidong Street in Taipei City.

=== Writers-in-Residence Program ===
Taiwan Literature Base established the quarterly writers-in-residence program to promote creative writing and experimentation in the realms of Taiwanese literature and culture and to facilitate communications among authors, readers, and the cultural-creative sector. Through this program, authors from Taiwan and around the world are invited to live for several months on site to experience life in a Japanese-era dormitory at the heart of Taipei City and to host a series of activities designed to give readers of Taiwan literature a behind-the-scenes glimpse into creative writing. The participating writers include Hung Shih-ting and others.

== Transportation ==
The street area is accessible within walking distance west of Zhongxiao Xinsheng Station of Taipei Metro.

== See also ==
- Taiwan under Japanese rule
