= Insect Science Museum =

Museum in Zhongzheng, Taipei, Taiwan

- 昆蟲科學博物館
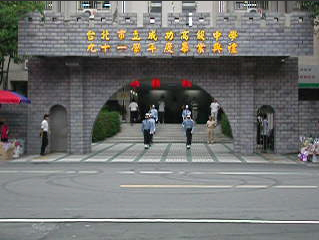
- Established: 1971
- Location: Zhongzheng, Taipei, Taiwan
- Coordinates: 25°02′34″N 121°31′25″E
- Type: museum

The Insect Science Museum (traditional Chinese: 昆蟲科學博物館; simplified Chinese: 昆虫科学博物馆; pinyin: Kūnchóng Kēxué Bówùguǎn) is a museum of insects in Zhongzheng District, Taipei, Taiwan. The museum is located at Cheng Kung Senior High School and it is one of the largest insect science museums in Asia.

== History ==
The museum was constructed in 1968 and was opened to the public on 1971.

== Exhibitions ==
The museum exhibits various collections of insects in the form of model specimens. In total, there are around 750 boxes and almost 40,000 specimens displayed at the museum.

== Transportation ==
The museum is accessible within walking distance south from Shandao Temple Station of the Taipei Metro.

== See also ==
- List of museums in Taiwan
