= Wellspring Theater =

Theater in Zhongzheng, Taipei, Taiwan

- 水源劇場
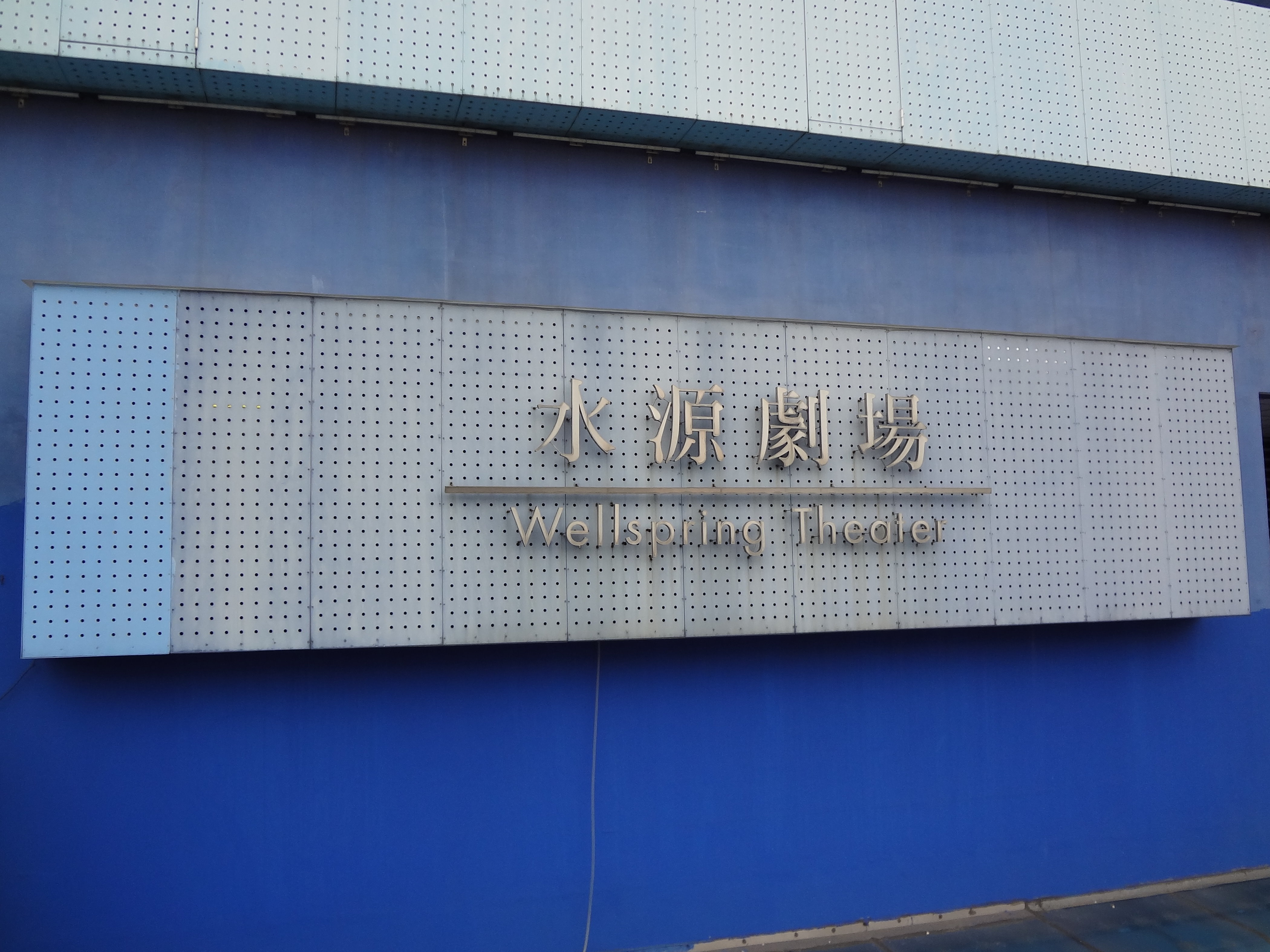
- Interactive map of Wellspring Theater
- Address: 10F, Shui Yuan Building
- Location: Zhongzheng, Taipei, Taiwan
- Coordinates: 25.013683°N 121.535009°E
- Owner: Department of Cultural Affairs, Taipei City Government
- Type: theater
- Public transit: Gongguan Station

Construction
- Opened: November 2011

The Wellspring Theater (traditional Chinese: 水源劇場; simplified Chinese: 水源剧场; pinyin: Shuǐyuán Jùchǎng) is a theater in Zhongzheng District, Taipei, Taiwan.

== History ==
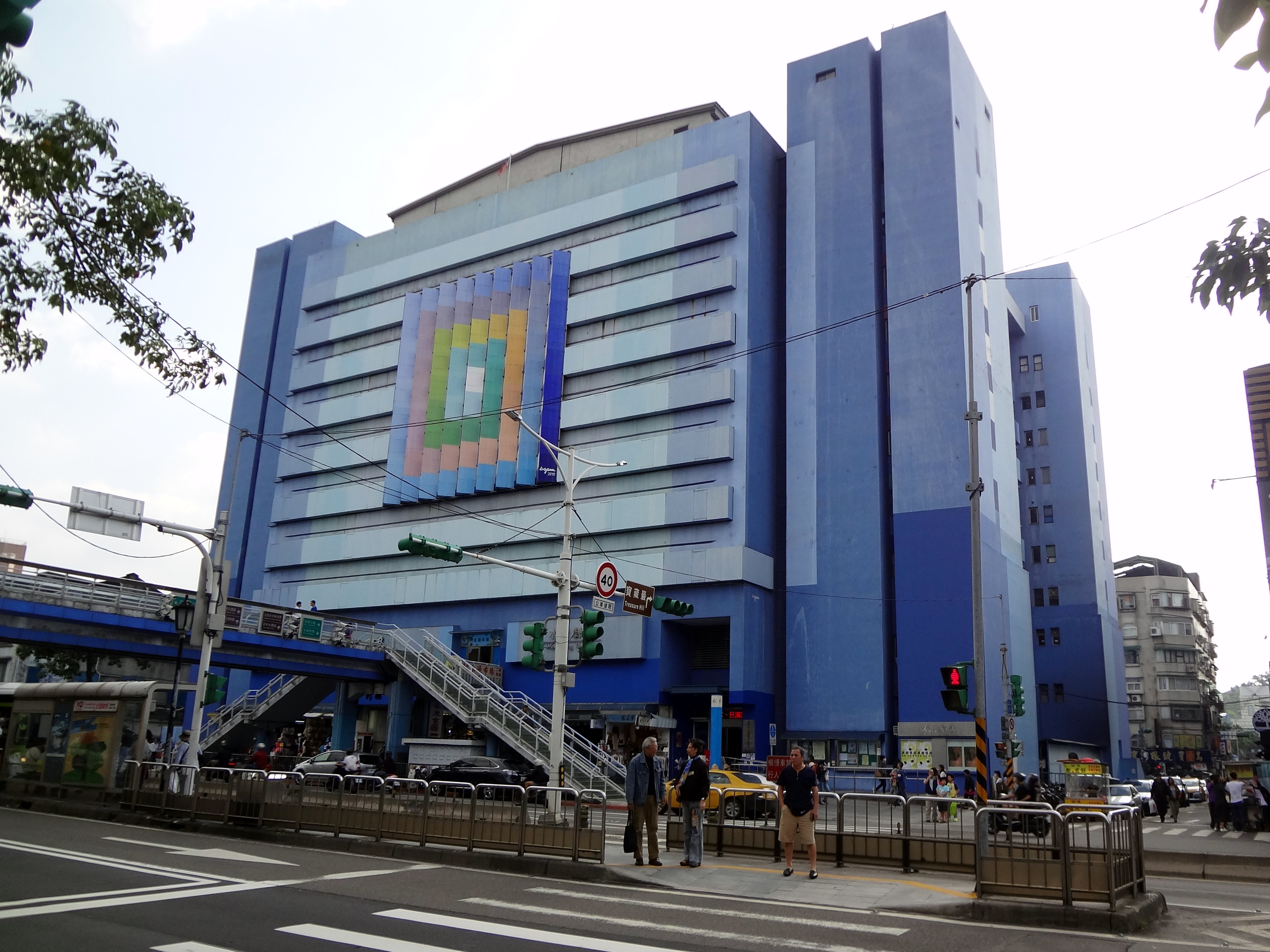
Shui Yuan Building

The Shui Yuan Building (Chinese: 水源大樓) was once the unit of the Republic of China Armed Forces handling compulsory military service. In 2009, the building was rebuilt and reopened in November 2011.

== Architecture ==
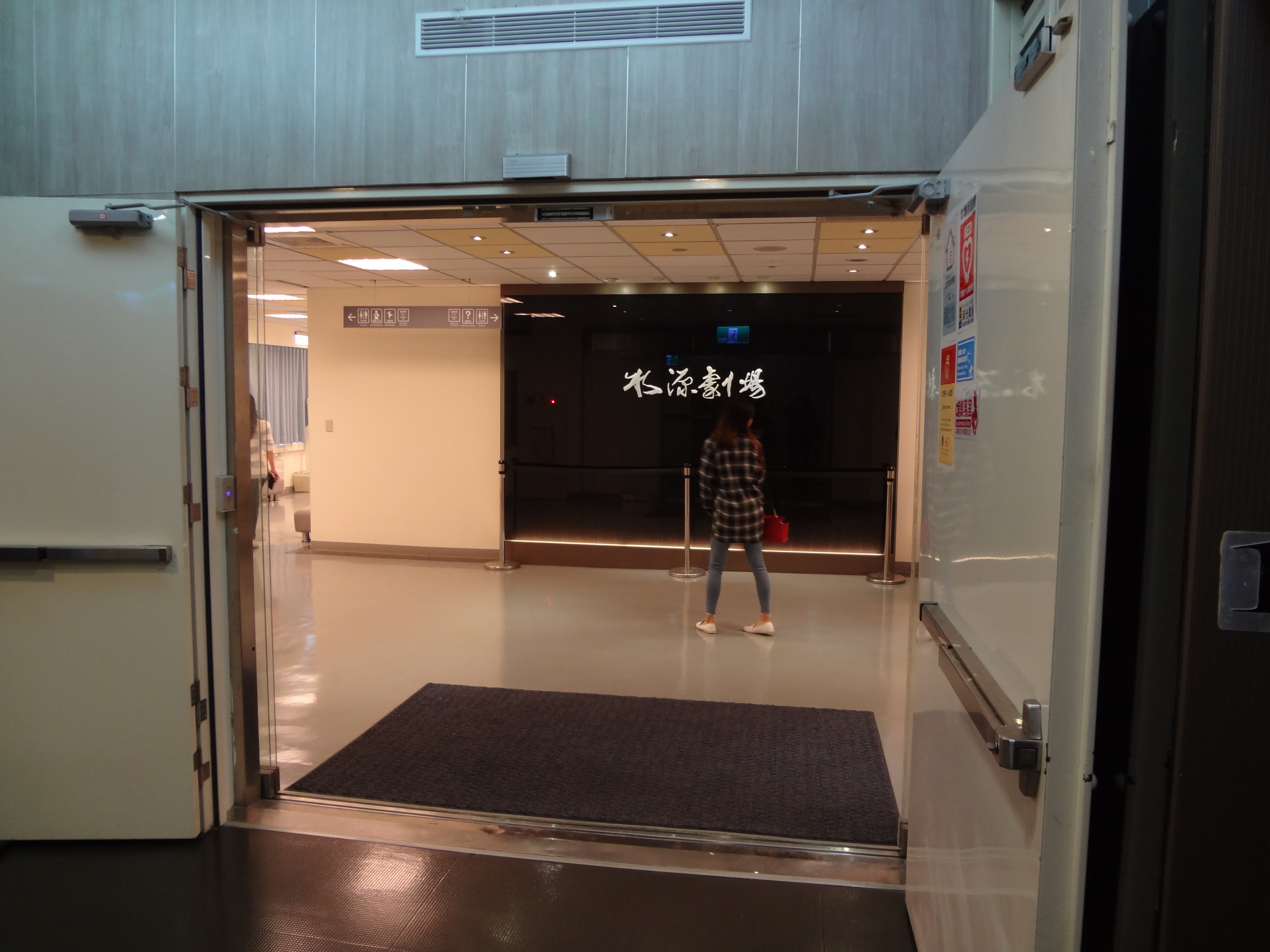
Wellspring Theater entrance

Wellspring Theater is located on the 10th floor of the Shui Yuan Building.

== Transportation ==
The theater is accessible within walking distance South East from Gongguan Station of the Taipei Metro.

== See also ==
- Cinema of Taiwan
