= Guling Street Avant-garde Theatre =

Theater in Taiwan

- 牯嶺街小劇場
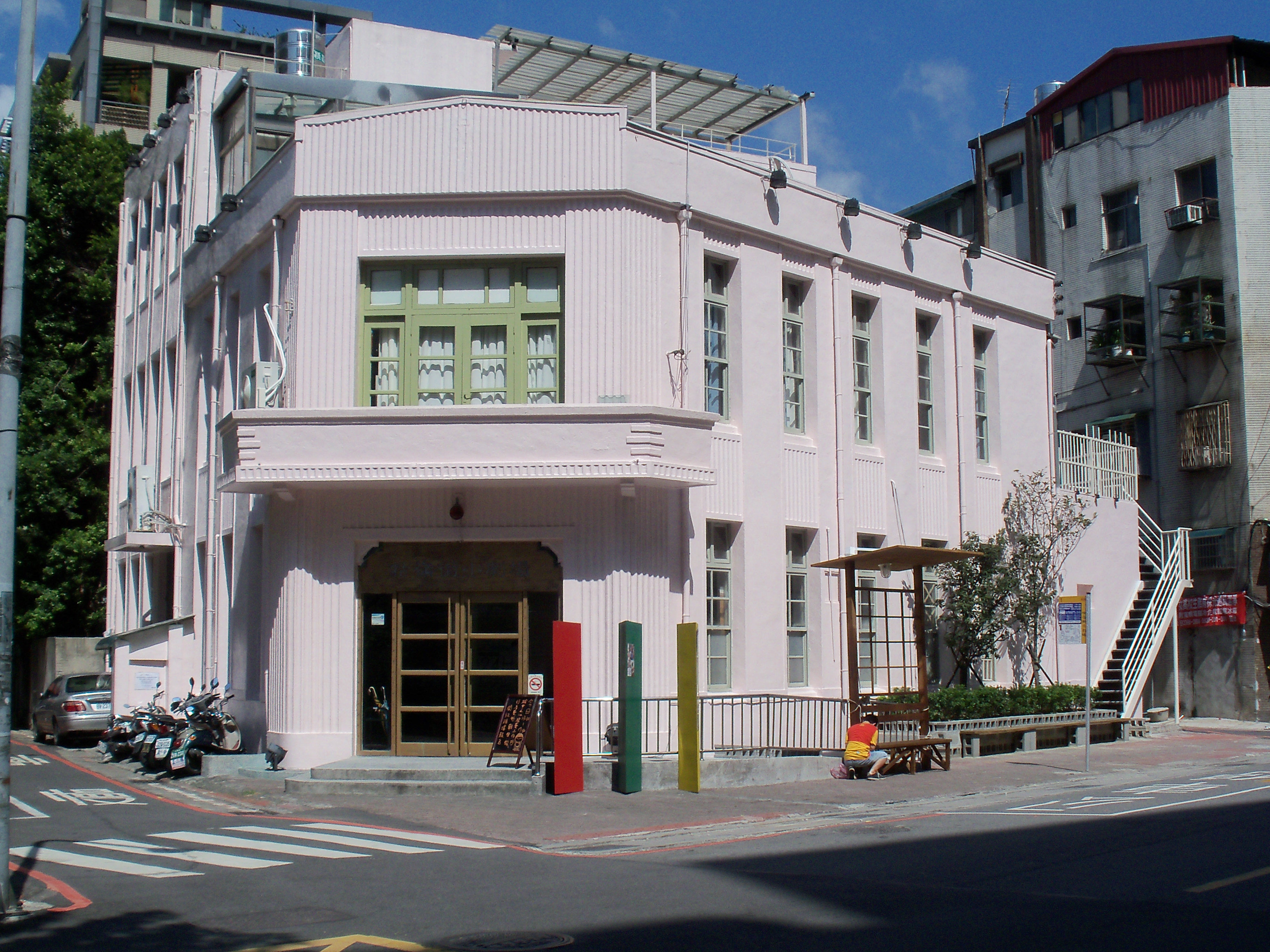
- Interactive map of Guling Street Avant-garde Theatre
- Location: Zhongzheng, Taipei, Taiwan
- Coordinates: 25°1′54.26″N 121°30′55.28″E
- Owner: Taipei City Government
- Capacity: 50-70 persons

Construction
- Opened: 2002

The Guling Street Avant-garde Theatre (Chinese: 牯嶺街小劇場; pinyin: Gǔlǐng Jiē Xiǎo Jùchǎng) is located in Zhongzheng District of Taipei, Taiwan. It was constructed in 1906 to serve as a police station during Japanese rule. In 2002, a small theatre was opened and has hosted more than 8,000 guests.

== History ==
The structure was built in 1906 in Baroque architecture style. The building served as a Japanese military police station. After the war, the building was used by the Taipei City Government as the Police Department Crime Section. In 1958, the structure was rebuilt in the style of a Japanese brick building and converted into Taipei Police Zhongzheng District second branch. In 1995, the second branch moved out and the building was transferred to the control of Taipei City Government Information Services Department and scheduled to transform into a venue for small theatre performances. In 2001, the Department of Cultural Affairs, Taipei City Government renamed the building the “Guling St. Avant-Garde Theatre." Because the building's original Baroque-style design features especially thick walls and a central area without pillars, it is extremely suitable for small-scale theatrical performances.

== Features ==
- The avant-garde theater has a capacity for an audience of between 50 and 70 persons.
- The detention room preserves the original appearance of the detention room from the theatre's previous incarnation as a police station.
- The rehearsal room is a perfect rehearsal space, with an area of over 1,000 square feet (93 m^{2}), and no obstructions from pillars.

== Transportation ==
The theater is accessible within walking distance west of Chiang Kai-shek Memorial Hall Station of Taipei Metro.

== See also ==
- Cinema of Taiwan
