= Zhongzheng District =

District of Taipei, Taiwan

Coordinates: 25°01′54″N 121°30′59″E

Zhongzheng 中正區 Jhongjheng, Chūsei
- District
- Zhongzheng District
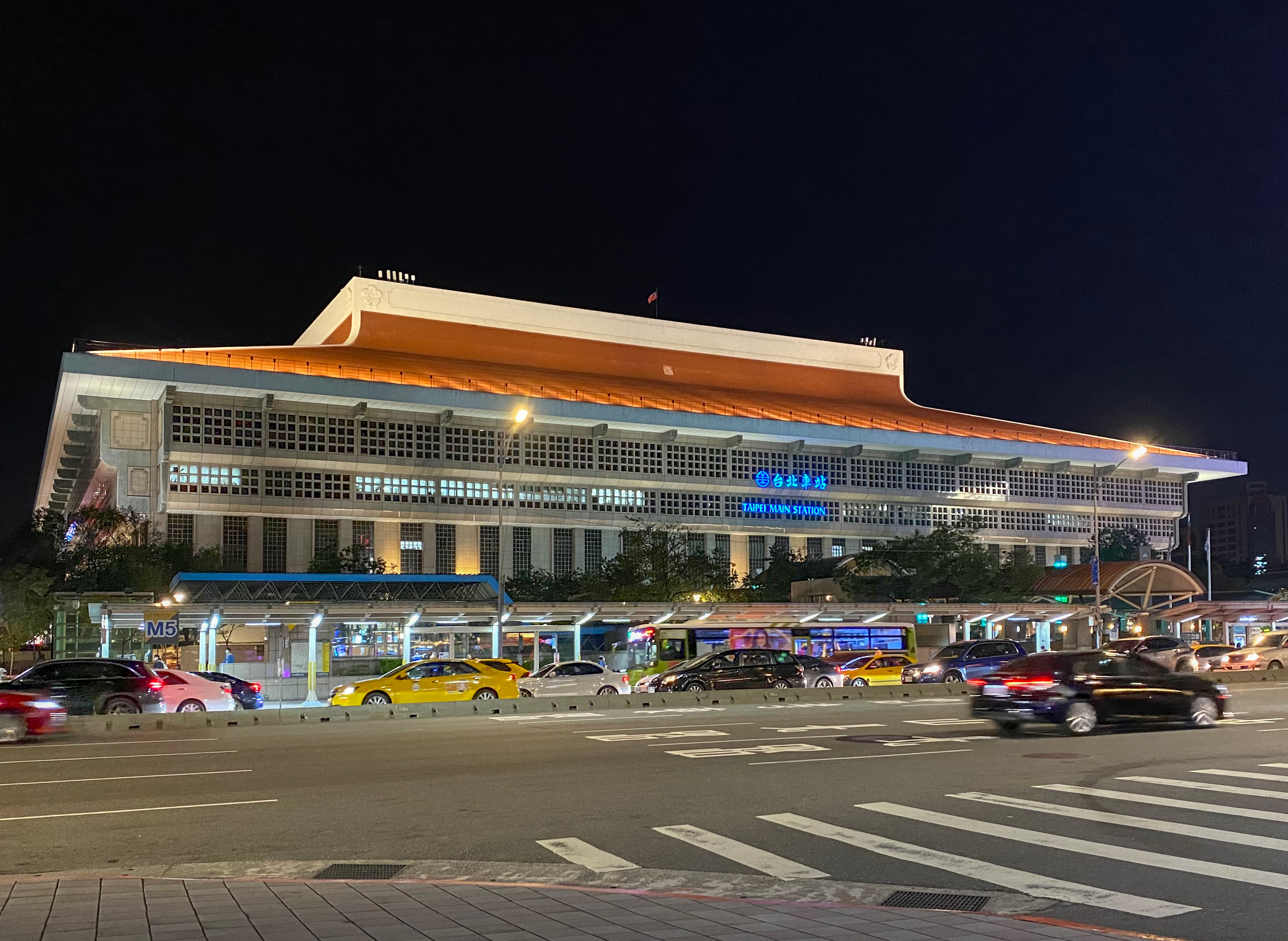
- Taipei Main Station
- Interactive map of Zhongzheng
- Country: Republic of China (Taiwan)
- Region: western Taipei
- Divisions: List: 31 villages; 583 neighborhoods

Area
  - Total: 7.6071 km^{2} (2.9371 sq mi)
  - Rank: Ranked 11th of 12

Population (January 2023)
  - Total: 148,505
  - Rank: Ranked 10th of 12
  - Density: 19,522/km^{2} (50,561/sq mi)
- Postal code: 100
- Website: zzdo.gov.taipei (in Chinese)

Zhongzheng District
- Traditional Chinese: 中正區
- Simplified Chinese: 中正区
Transcriptions
Standard Mandarin
- Hanyu Pinyin: Zhōngzhèng Qū
- Wade–Giles: Chung-cheng Chü
Southern Min
- Hokkien POJ: Tiong-chèng-khu

Chengzhong (old name)
- Traditional Chinese: 城中
Transcriptions

Zhongzheng District (also Jhongjheng District) is a district in Taipei, Taiwan. Taipei Main Station is located in the district. It is home to most of the national government buildings of Taiwan.

== Overview ==
The district is named after former President of the Republic of China Chiang Kai-shek. This district has many cultural and educational sites including the Taipei Botanical Garden, the National Taiwan Museum, the National Museum of History, the National Central Library, National Theater and Concert Hall and the Taiwan Film and Audiovisual Institute. Other museums include the Chunghwa Postal Museum, the Taipei City Traffic Museum for Children, and the Taipei Museum of Drinking Water. Much of the Qing-era city of Taipeh lies within this district.

High School and college students frequent the area immediately south of the Taipei Main Station. This area has a high concentration of bookstores, cram schools, learning centers, private tutoring centers and test-prep centers.

== History ==
The district was formed in 1990 after the merging of Chengzhong District (城中區) and Guting District (古亭區).

== Cultural institutions and museums ==
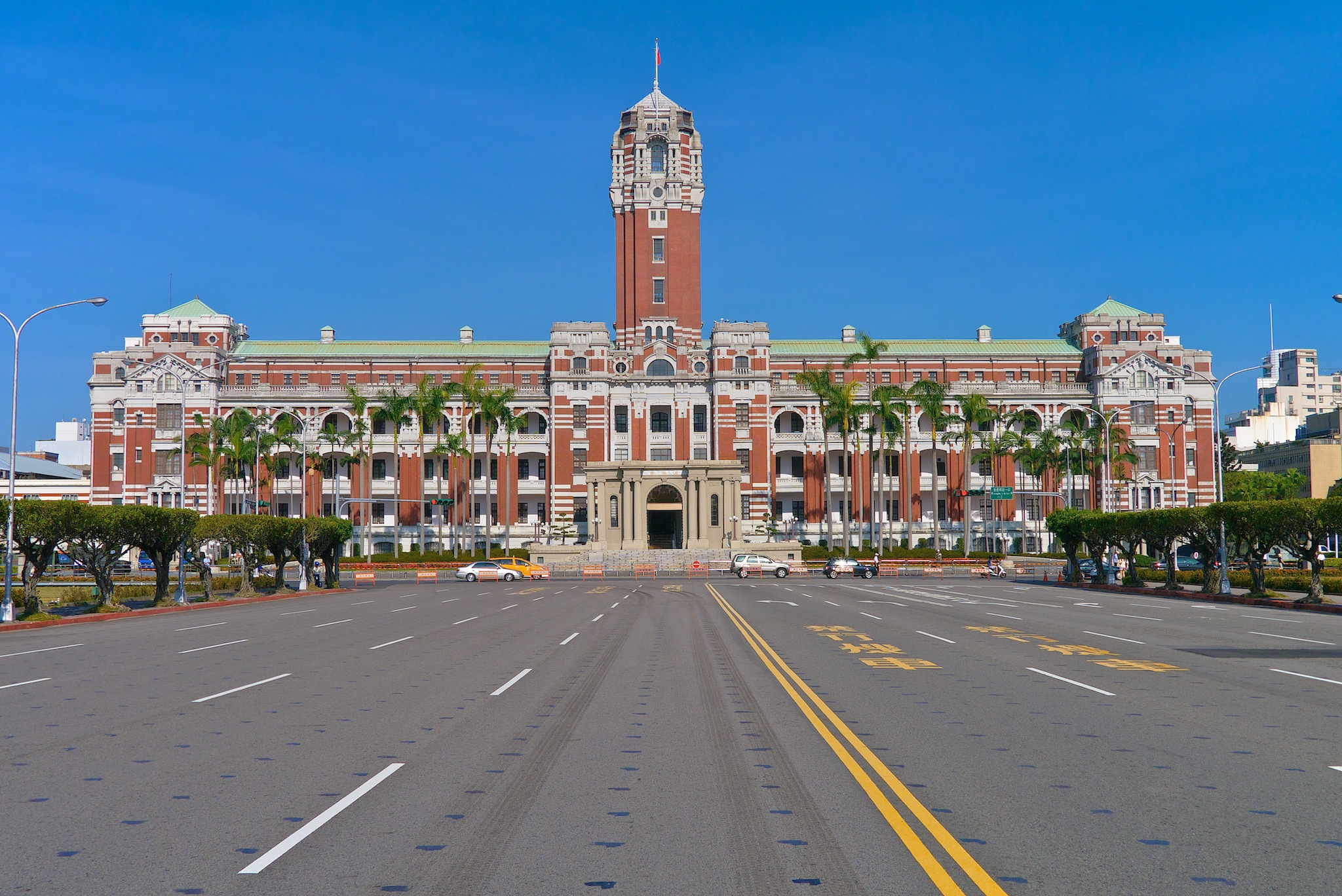
Presidential Office Building on Ketagalan Boulevard

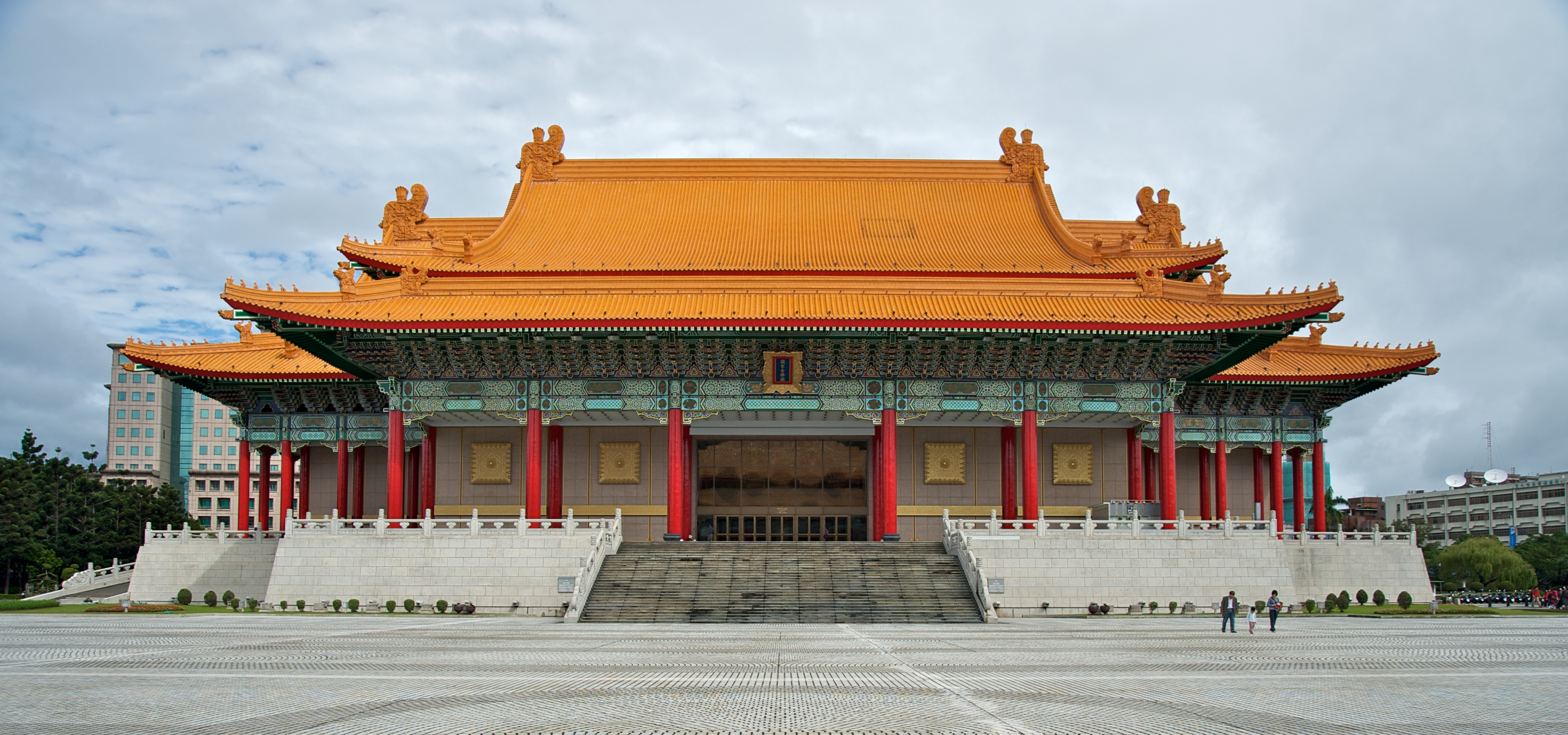
National Concert Hall

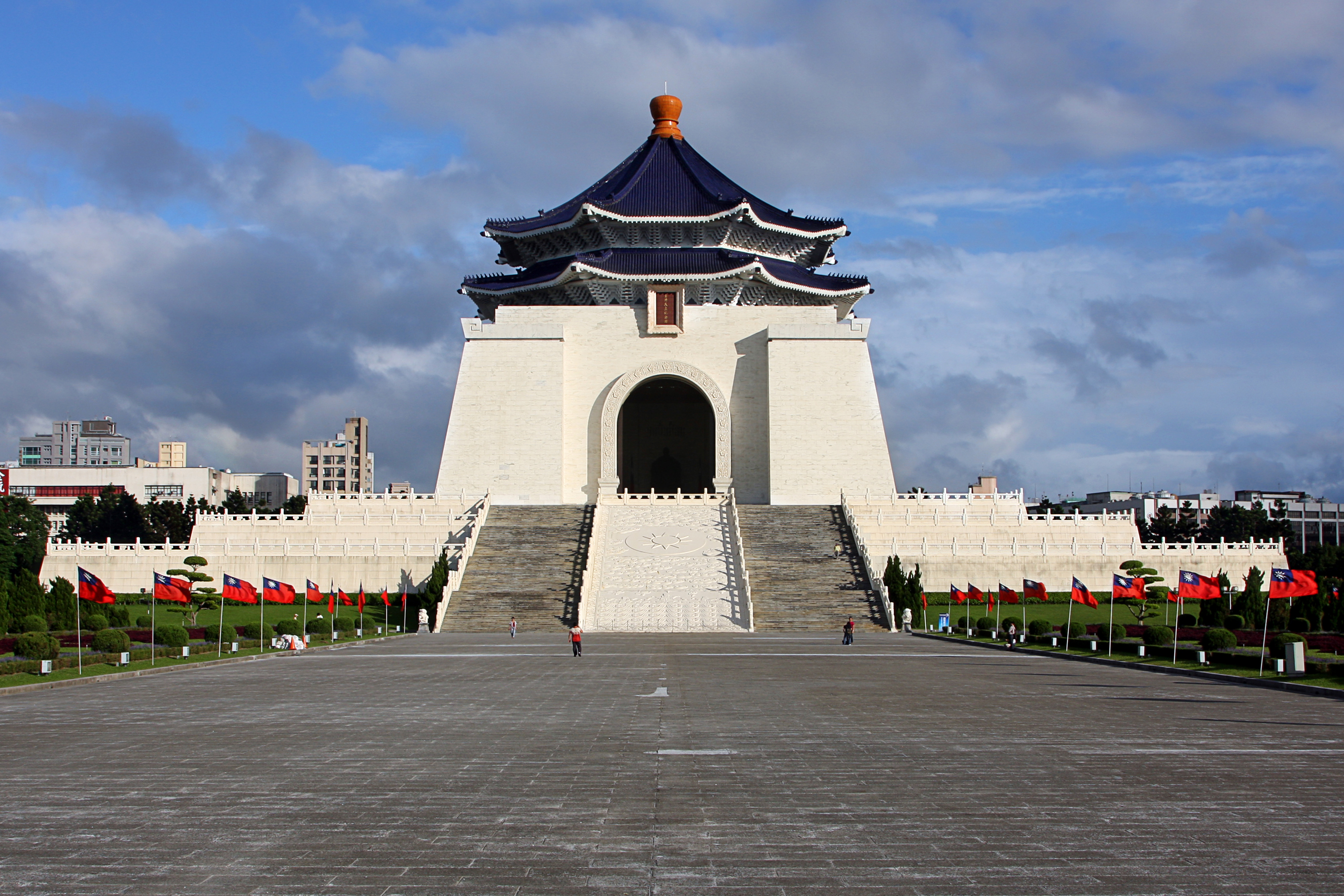
Chiang Kai-shek Memorial Hall

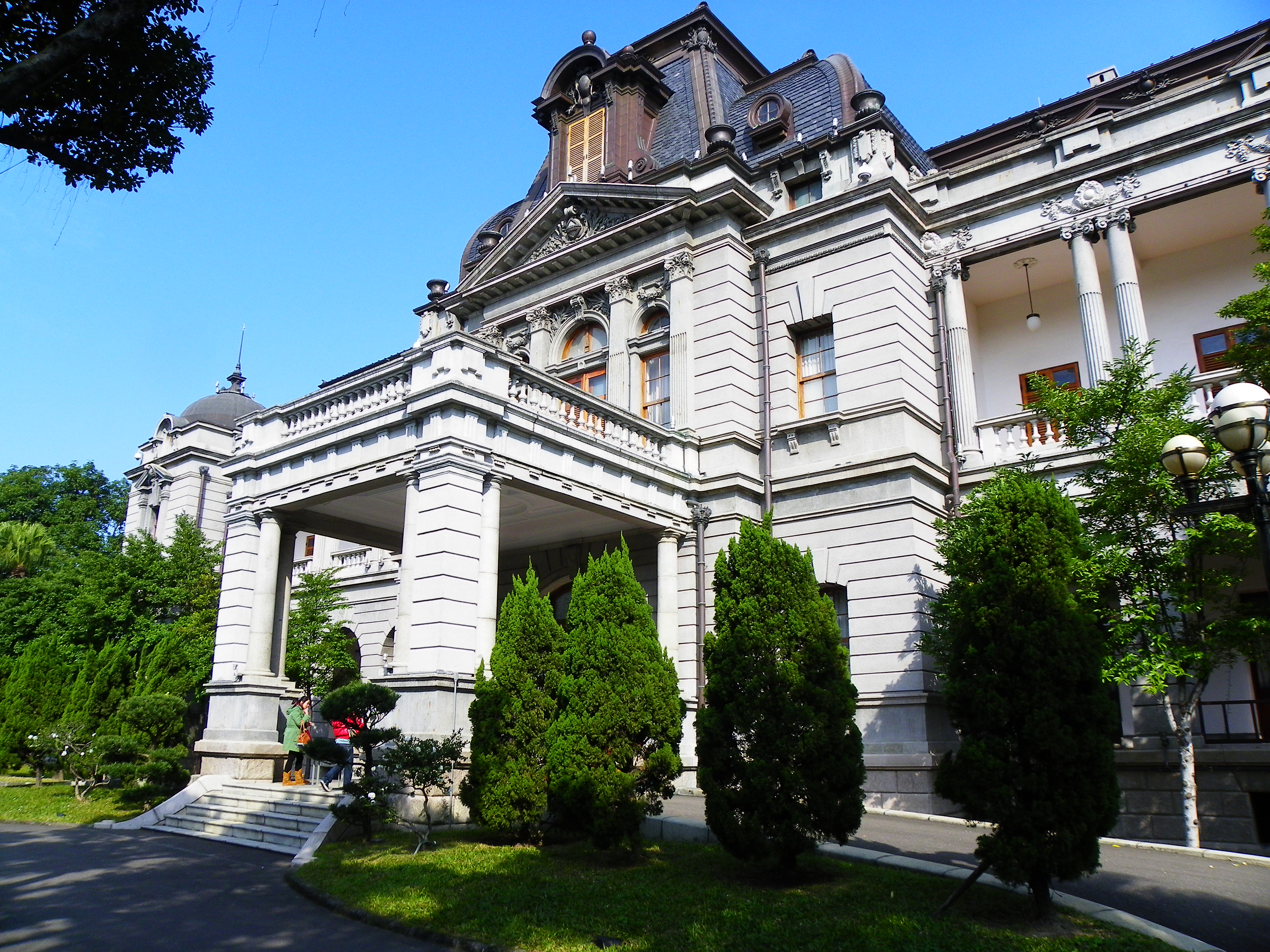
Taipei Guest House

- Evergreen Maritime Museum
- Guling Street Avant-garde Theatre
- Insect Science Museum
- Mayor's Residence Art Salon
- Museum of Drinking Water
- Museum of Medical Humanities
- Nanhai Academy
- National Chiang Kai-shek Memorial Hall
- National Central Library
- National Museum of History
- National Taiwan Museum
- National Theater and Concert Hall
- Republic of China Armed Forces Museum
- Republic of China Presidential Museum
- Taiwan Film and Audiovisual Institute
- Wellspring Theater

== Government institutions ==
- Presidential Office Building
- Executive Yuan
- Legislative Yuan
- Judicial Yuan
- Control Yuan
- Ministry of Culture
- Ministry of Foreign Affairs
- Ministry of the Interior
- Ministry of Economic Affairs
- Ministry of Finance
- Ministry of Education
- Ministry of Transportation and Communications
- Ministry of Justice
- Central Bank of the Republic of China (Taiwan)
- Supreme Court of the Republic of China
- Taiwan High Court
- Youth Development Administration
- Central Weather Bureau
- National Immigration Agency
- National Police Agency
- National Development Council
- Bureau of Audiovisual and Music Industry Development
- Bureau of Foreign Trade
- Bureau of Standards, Metrology and Inspection
- Centers for Disease Control
- Consumer Protection Committee
- Political Warfare Bureau
- Forestry Bureau
- Agriculture and Food Agency
- Taiwan Forestry Research Institute
- Taiwan Railway

== Historic sites ==
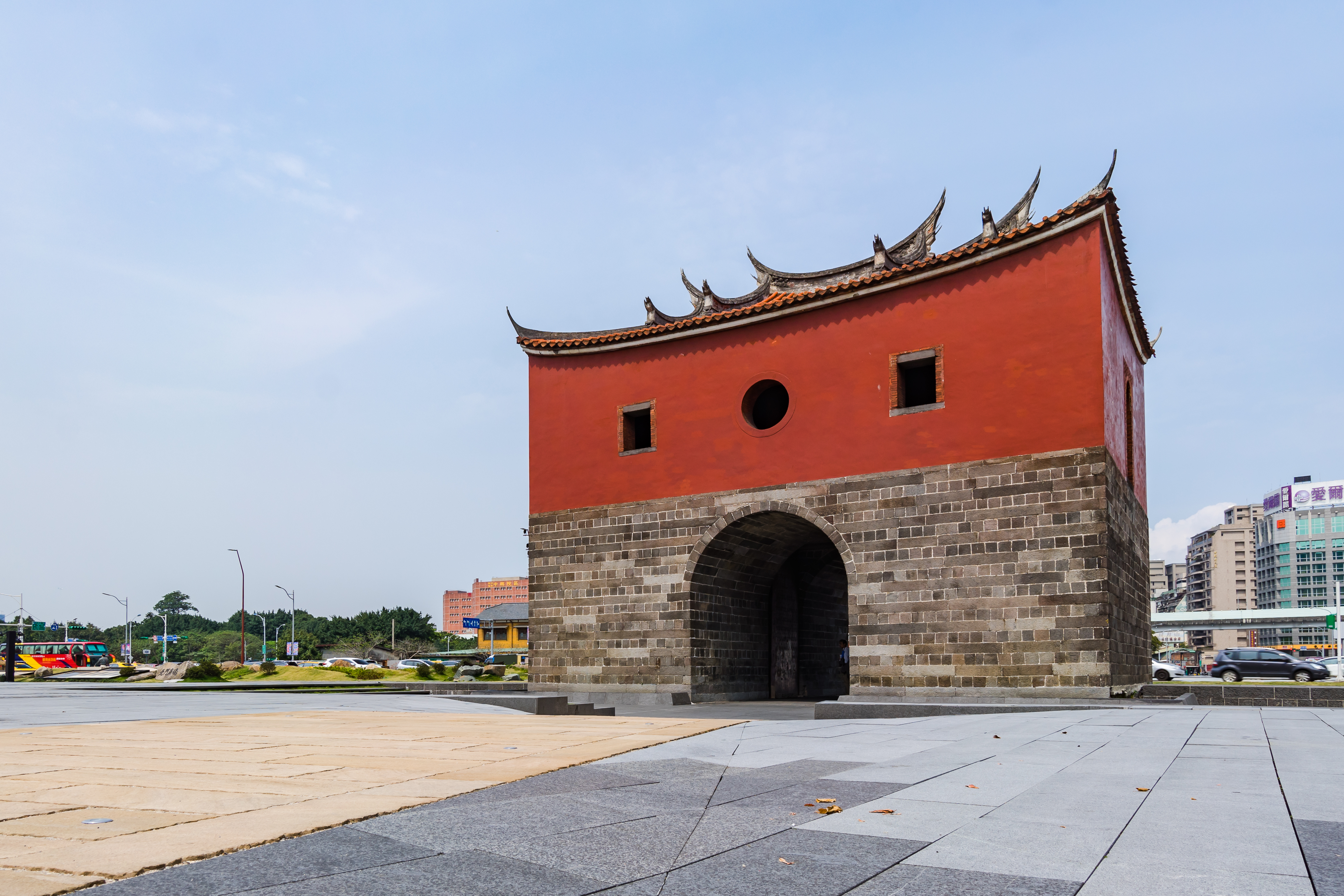
Taipei's North Gate

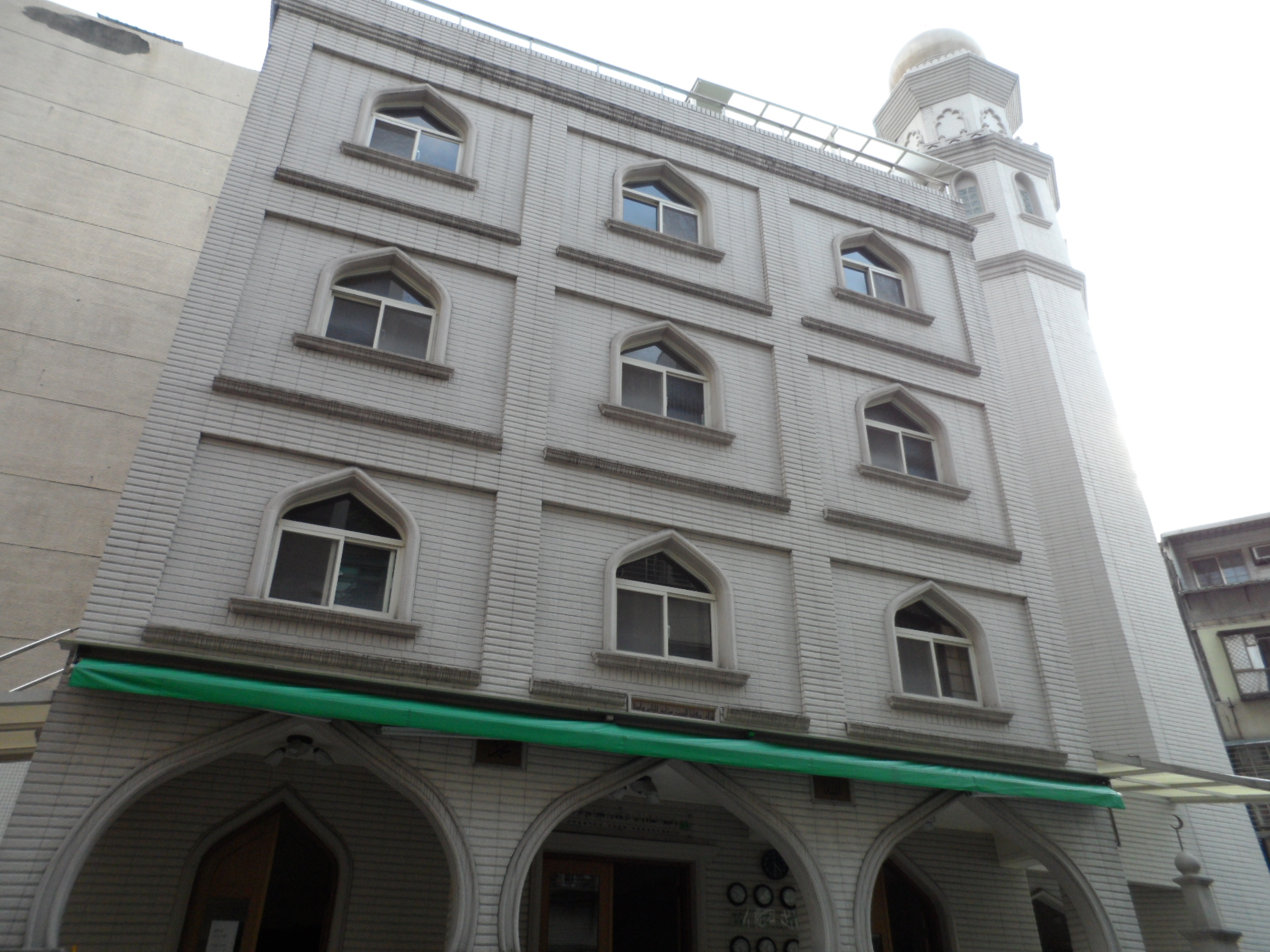
Taipei Cultural Mosque

- Taipei City Walls
- Zhongshan Hall
- Taipei Post Office Building
- Taiwan Education Association Building
- 228 Peace Memorial Park
- Taipei Guest House
- National Taiwan Museum
- Monopoly Bureau Building
- Bank of Taiwan Building
- Treasure Hill
- Qidong Street Japanese Houses (Taipei Qin Hall)
- Remains of Taipei prison walls
- Shandao Temple
- Taiwan Provincial City God Temple
- Taipei Cultural Mosque
- Huashan 1914 Creative Park
- Cafe Astoria
- Qing Dynasty Taiwan Provincial Administration Hall
- Li Kwoh-ting's Residence
- Sun Yun-suan Memorial Museum
- Thome Courtyard

== Educational institutions ==
=== Universities and colleges ===
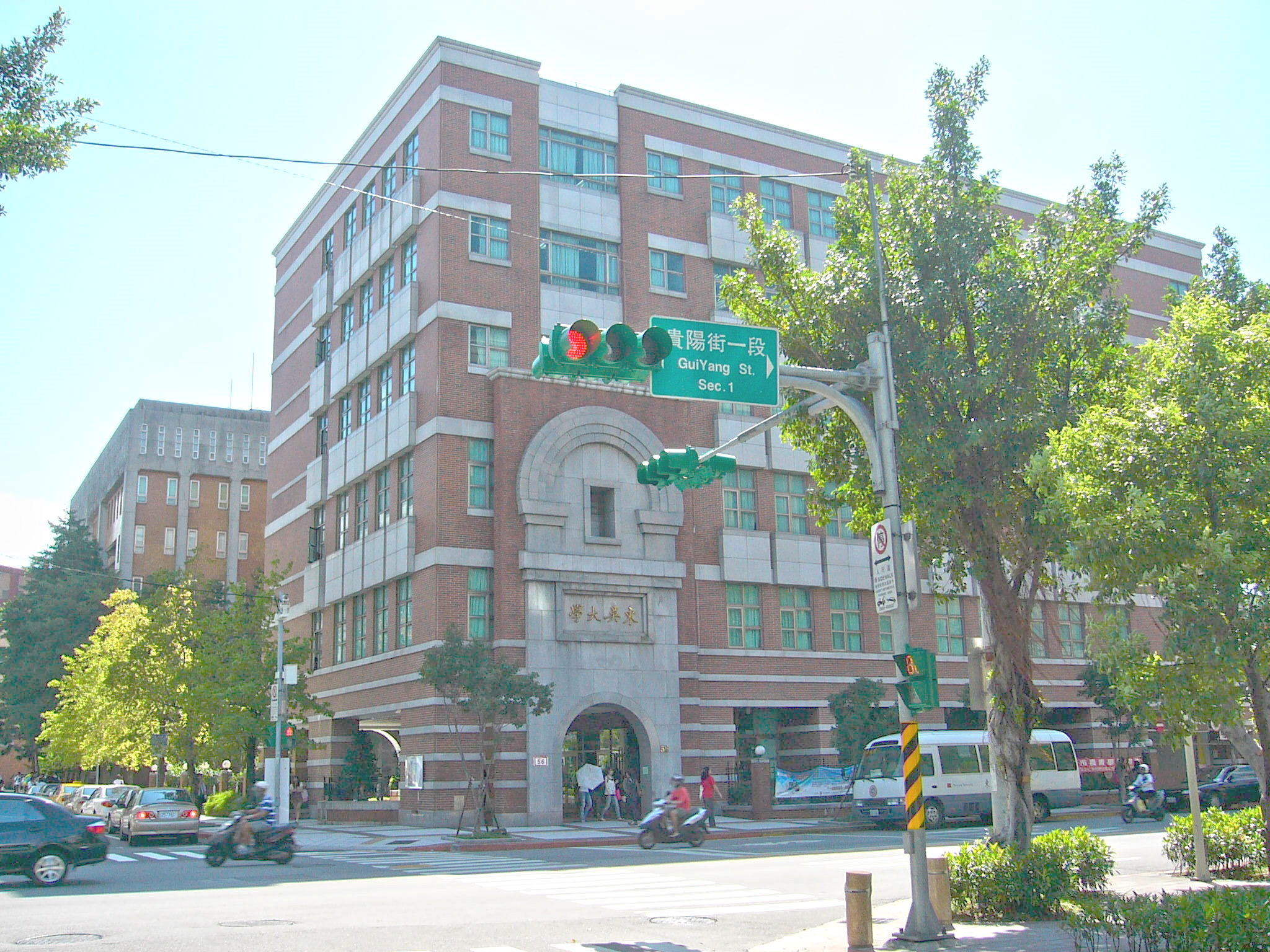
Soochow University Downtown Campus

- University of Taipei
- National Taiwan University School of Law and School of Medicine
- National Yang Ming Chiao Tung University Peimen Campus
- Soochow University Downtown Campus (Soochow University School of Law)
- Chinese Culture University Bo'ai Campus
- Chung Hua University Taipei Campus
- National Taipei College of Business

=== Primary and secondary schools ===
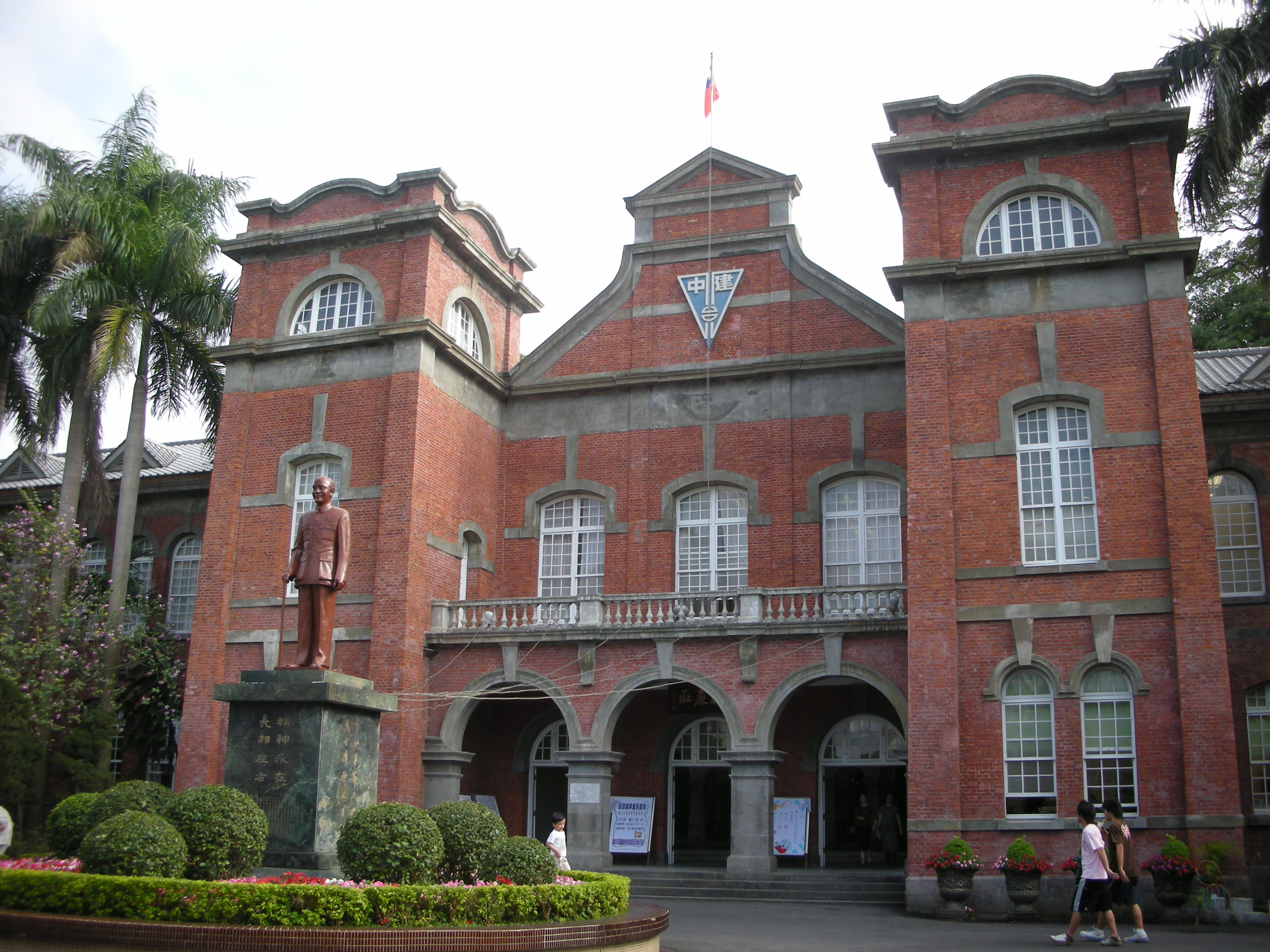
Taipei Municipal Jianguo High School

High schools:

- Taipei Municipal Jianguo High School
- Cheng Kung Senior High School
- Taipei First Girls' High School
- Morrison Academy

Elementary schools:

- Affiliated Experimental Elementary School of the University of Taipei (ESUT; 臺北市立大學附設實驗國民小學)

=== Other educational institutions ===
- Taipei Ricci Institute
- Taipei Language Institute
- Mandarin Daily News
- Taipei Language Institute

== Transportation ==
Zhongzheng District has the best transportation links of any district in Taipei. It contains Taipei Main Station, a major bus and rail hub. Taipei Main Station is a major stop on the Taiwan Railway's Western Line, and the Taiwan High Speed Rail. The Red Line, Blue Line, Orange Line, Green Line of the Taipei Metro and the Airport MRT connect the district, eleven stations are located in the district: Zhongxiao Xinsheng, Shandao Temple, Taipei Main Station, Ximen, Xiaonanmen, National Taiwan University Hospital, Chiang Kai-shek Memorial Hall, Dongmen, Guting, Taipower Building and Gongguan.

== Hospitals ==
Two notable hospitals are in this district. One is the National Taiwan University Hospital. The other is the Taipei Municipal Heping (Hoping) Hospital, which was quarantined for being the center of the SARS outbreak in Taiwan.

== Economy ==
Chunghwa Telecom, and A.mart (Far Eastern Ai Mai) have their headquarters in the district. Pxmart previously had its headquarters in the district.

== Markets ==
Several bazaars and traditional markets are scattered throughout the district. This includes streets and alleys associated either as a camera and photography bazaar, clothing bazaar, and traditional produce markets such as the Dongmen Market and the Nanmen Market. The Gongguan Night Market caters to the students of the National Taiwan University. Shopping malls in the district are Guang Hua Digital Plaza and Syntrend Creative Park.

== Gallery ==
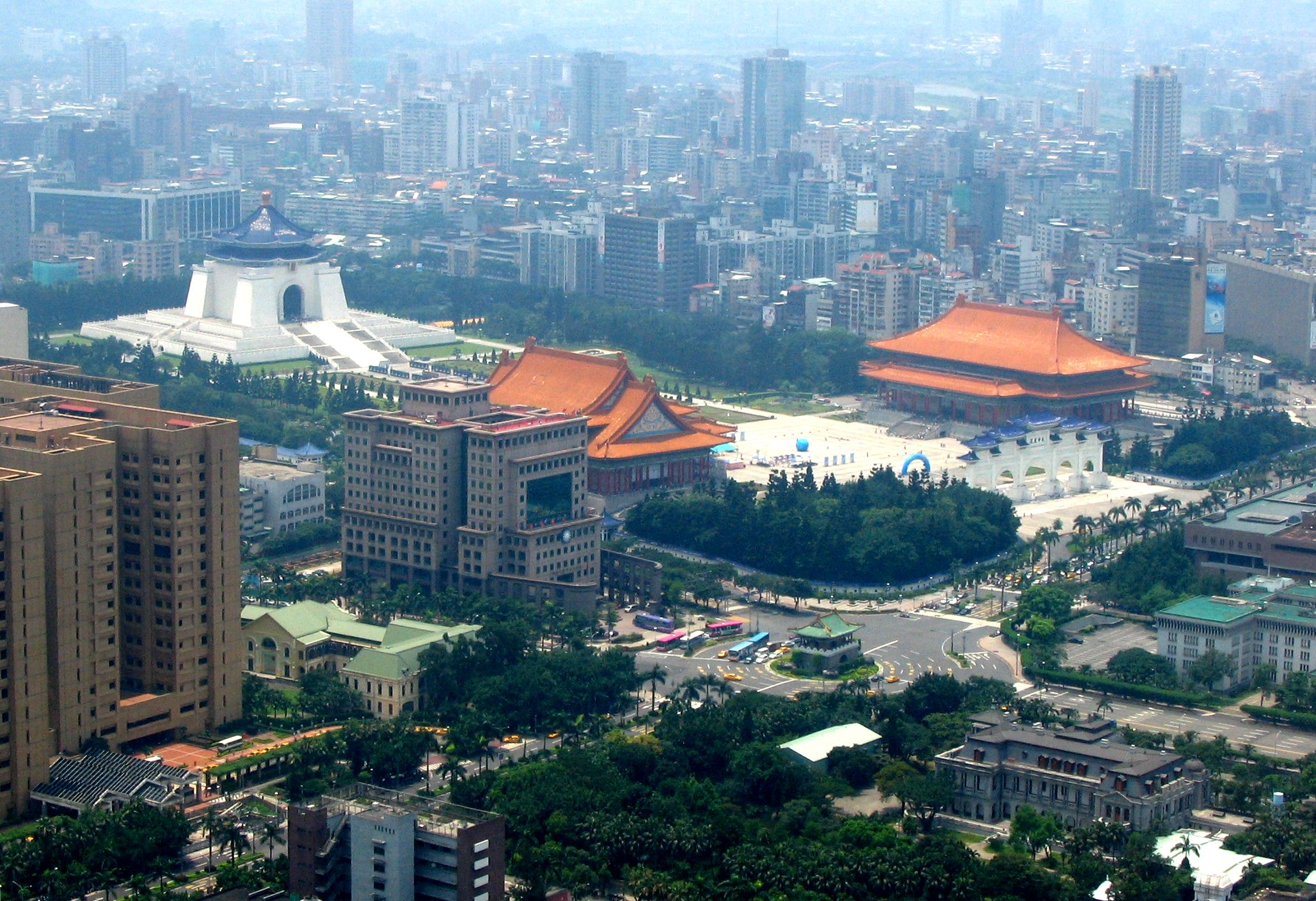
The Liberty Square is located in Zhongzheng District .

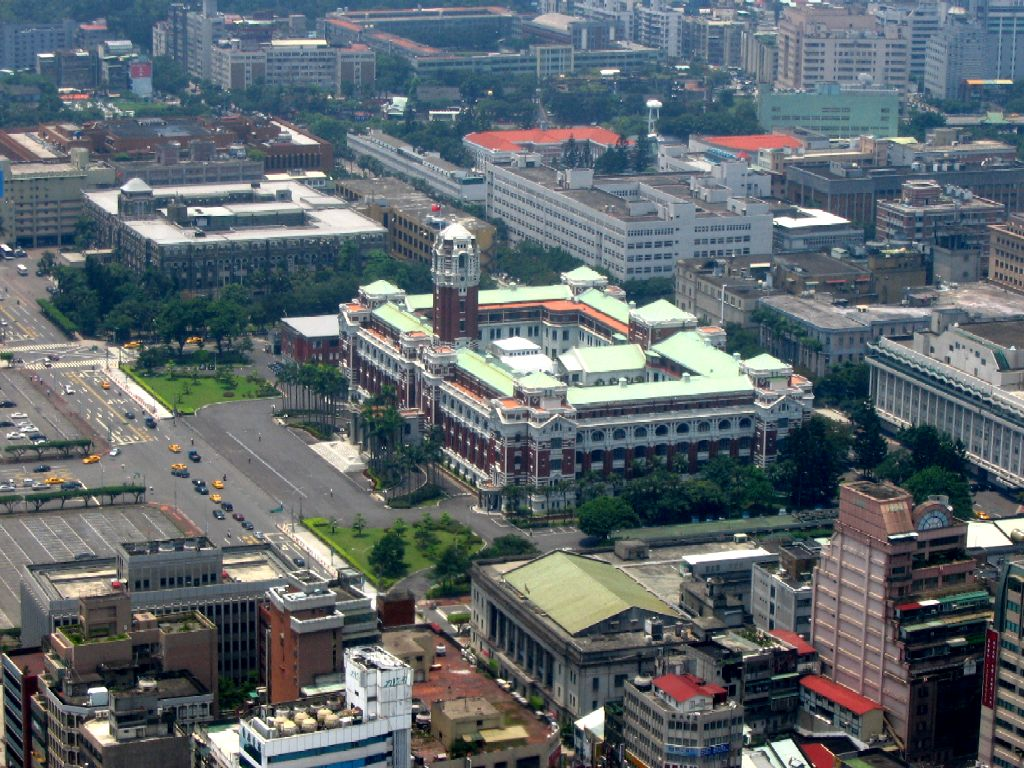
The Presidential Office (center) and the Judicial Yuan (upper left).

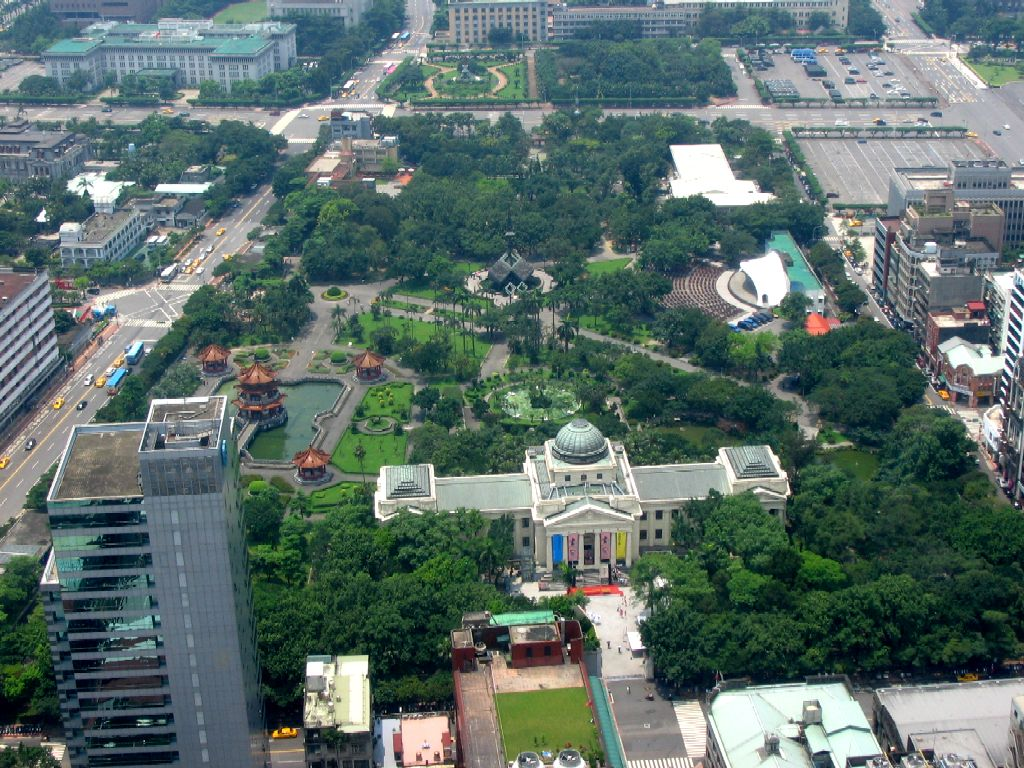
The 228 Memorial Park.

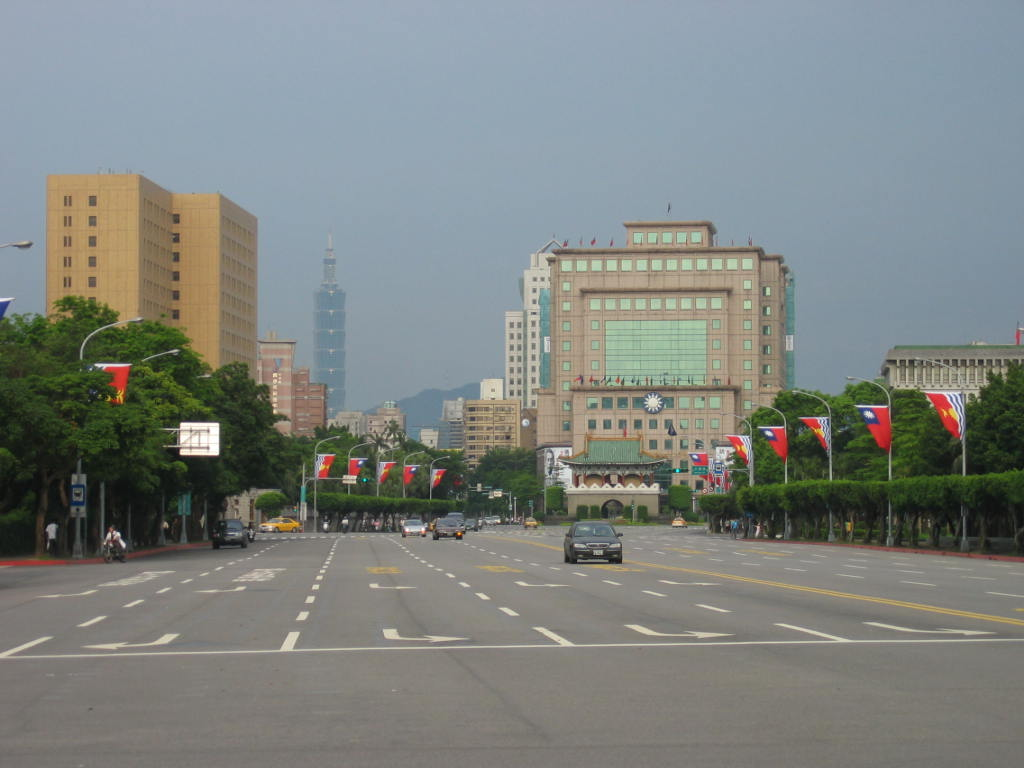
A view of Ketagalan Boulevard from the Presidential Building towards the East Gate.

== See also ==
- Taipei
