= Guang Hua Digital Plaza =

Shopping mall in Zhongzheng, Taipei, Taiwan

- 光華數位新天地
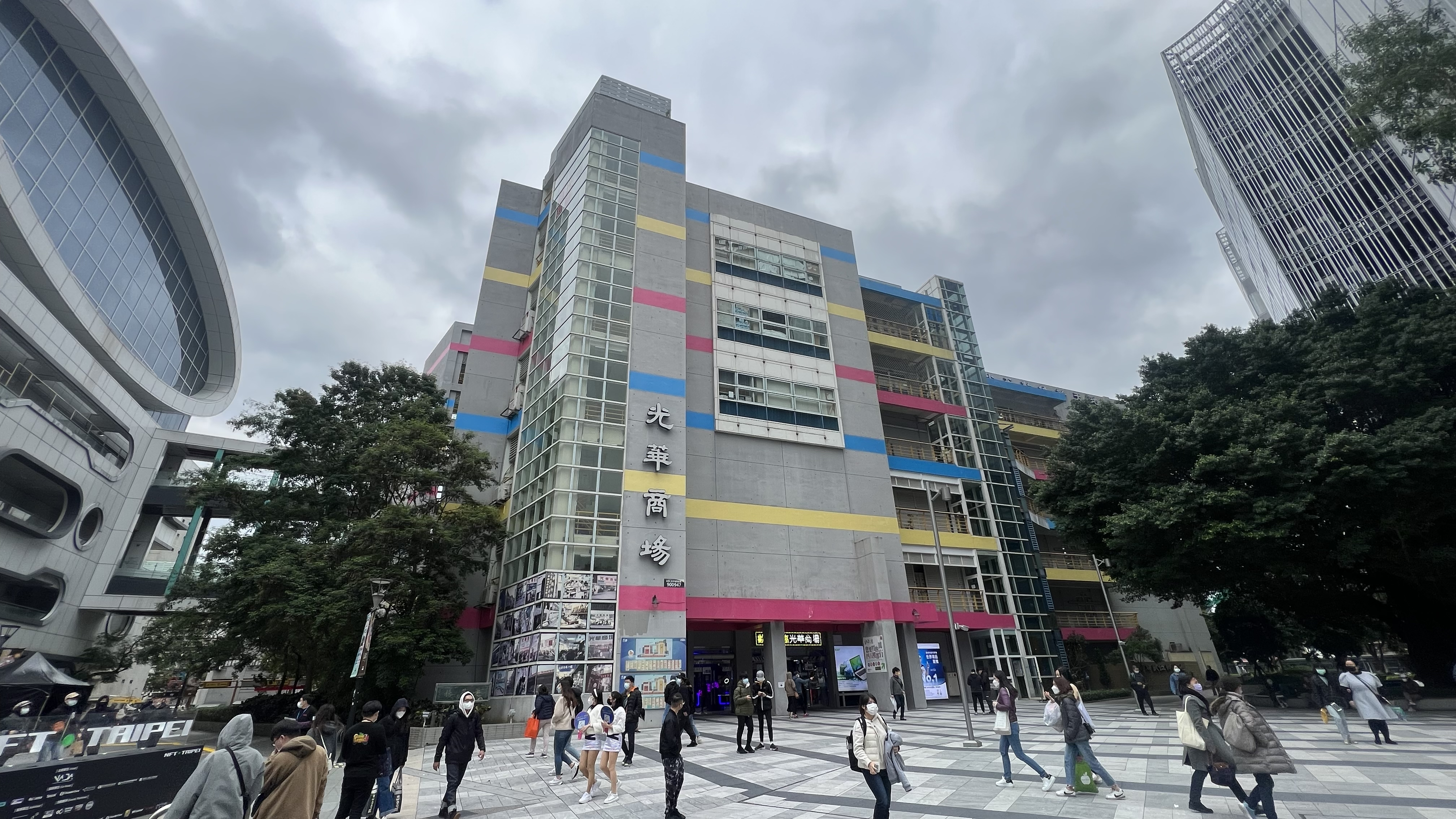
- Location: Zhongzheng, Taipei, Taiwan
- Coordinates: 25°02′42.96″N 121°31′55.92″E
- Opened: April 1973 (as Guang Hua Market); July 2008 (as Guang Hua Digital Plaza)
- Floors: 6

Guang Hua Digital Plaza
- Traditional Chinese: 光華數位新天地 or 光華商場
- Simplified Chinese: 光华数位新天地 or 光华商场
Transcriptions
Standard Mandarin
- Hanyu Pinyin: Guānghuá Shùwèi Xīntiāndì or Guānghuá Shāngchǎng
Southern Min
- Hokkien POJ: Kong-hôa sò͘-ūi sin thiⁿ-tē Kong-hôa siong-tiûⁿ

The Guang Hua Digital Plaza (Chinese: 光華數位新天地 or 光華商場) is a six-story, indoor technological and electronics market located in Taipei, Taiwan. It is located at the intersection of Xinsheng North Road (新生北路) and Civic Boulevard (市民大道), at the border between Zhongzheng and Da'an districts.

The building consists of six stories above ground and one story below ground. The first story above ground is an exhibition space for electronic products. The second and third stories are the new locations for the 196 vendors of the original Guang Hua Market. The fourth and fifth stories are the new locations for the vendors of Xining Guozhai Electronics Market. The sixth floor is reserved for repair shops, education classes, and offices. The basement floor is parking. The market attracts tens of thousands of visitors each day.

It is accessible from the Guanghua Bazaar bus stop and the MRT Zhongxiao Xinsheng Station. The surrounding area and streets are also full of shops selling electronics. Large companies, including Microsoft and Intel, regularly unveil products at Guang Hua Digital Plaza.

== History ==
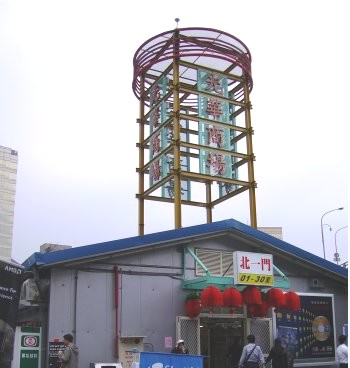
Guang Hua Market was located in this temporary building until July 2008.

Guang Hua Market was established by the Taipei City Government in April 1973 as a retailer market, using the space beneath the old Guanghua Bridge. Originally, the market specialized in old books, giving it the nickname "old books street" (舊書街). Within a decade, however, electronics retailers gained presence in the market and surrounding streets.

Due to underground railroad construction in 1992, Guang Hua Market was moved to an underground location at the corner of Bade Road and Xinsheng South Road. By this time, the area became known for electronics, with many new stores opening, and the establishment of other electronic markets such as the International Electronics Market (國際電子廣場), Contemporary Life Market (現代生活廣場), and Sanpu Market (三普廣場).

In 2006 due to the demolition of the Guanghua Bridge, Guang Hua Market was moved to a temporary location at the corner of Jinshan North Road and Civic Boulevard. The temporary building consisted of five warehouse-like halls, providing a total of 196 retail stores. Not soon after market moved into its temporary location, construction began on the current six-story Guang Hua Digital Plaza building, which has been its current location since July 2008.

== Nearby development ==
In 2010, the Taipei municipal government sought bids to build a new mall on the parking lots around Guang Hua Plaza. The city announced that the building should be located at the intersection of Civic Boulevard and Jinshan South Road, have a total of 21 floors (15 aboveground, six below); and occupy a total floor space of 2678 ping, or 8,850 square metres (95,300 sq ft). The park will also include hotel rooms, offices, and restaurants. On April 27, 2010, the build-operate-transfer (BOT) project was awarded to the Hon Hai Group, beating out four other bidders.

The new building opened in May 2015 as Syntrend Creative Park, featuring a technology exhibition center, digital entertainment zone, and business cultivation center.
