= Taipei Qin Hall =

Former residence in Zhongzheng, Taipei, Taiwan

- 臺北琴道舘
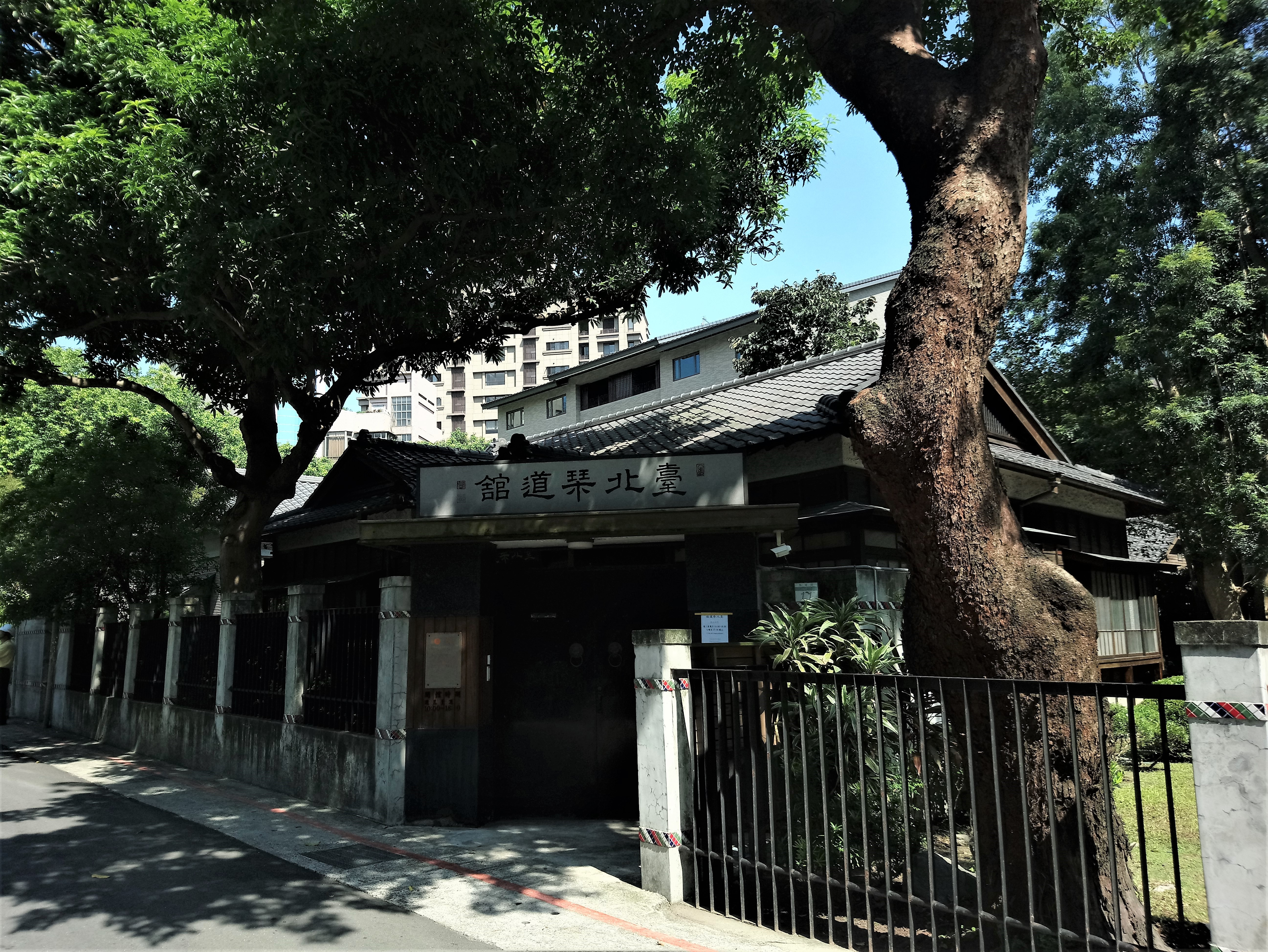
- Interactive map of the Taipei Qin Hall area

General information
- Type: former residence
- Location: Zhongzheng, Taipei, Taiwan
- Coordinates: 25°02′N 121°32′E

Design and construction
- Developer: Chinese Guqin Association

Website
- Official website (in Chinese)

The Taipei Qin Hall (traditional Chinese: 臺北琴道舘; simplified Chinese: 台北琴道馆; pinyin: Táiběi Qíndào Guǎn) is a former residence in Qidong Street, Zhongzheng District, Taipei, Taiwan.

== History ==
The building was established by Chinese Guqin Association and constructed around 1920 until 1940 during the Japanese rule of Taiwan. The building was then used as the official residence for Japanese public servants. The building has been designated as historical building by Taipei City Government.

== Transportation ==
The building is accessible within walking distance west of Zhongxiao Xinsheng Station of Taipei Metro.

== See also ==
- List of tourist attractions in Taiwan
