= Li Kwoh-ting's Residence =

Zhongzheng, Taipei, Taiwan

- 李國鼎故居
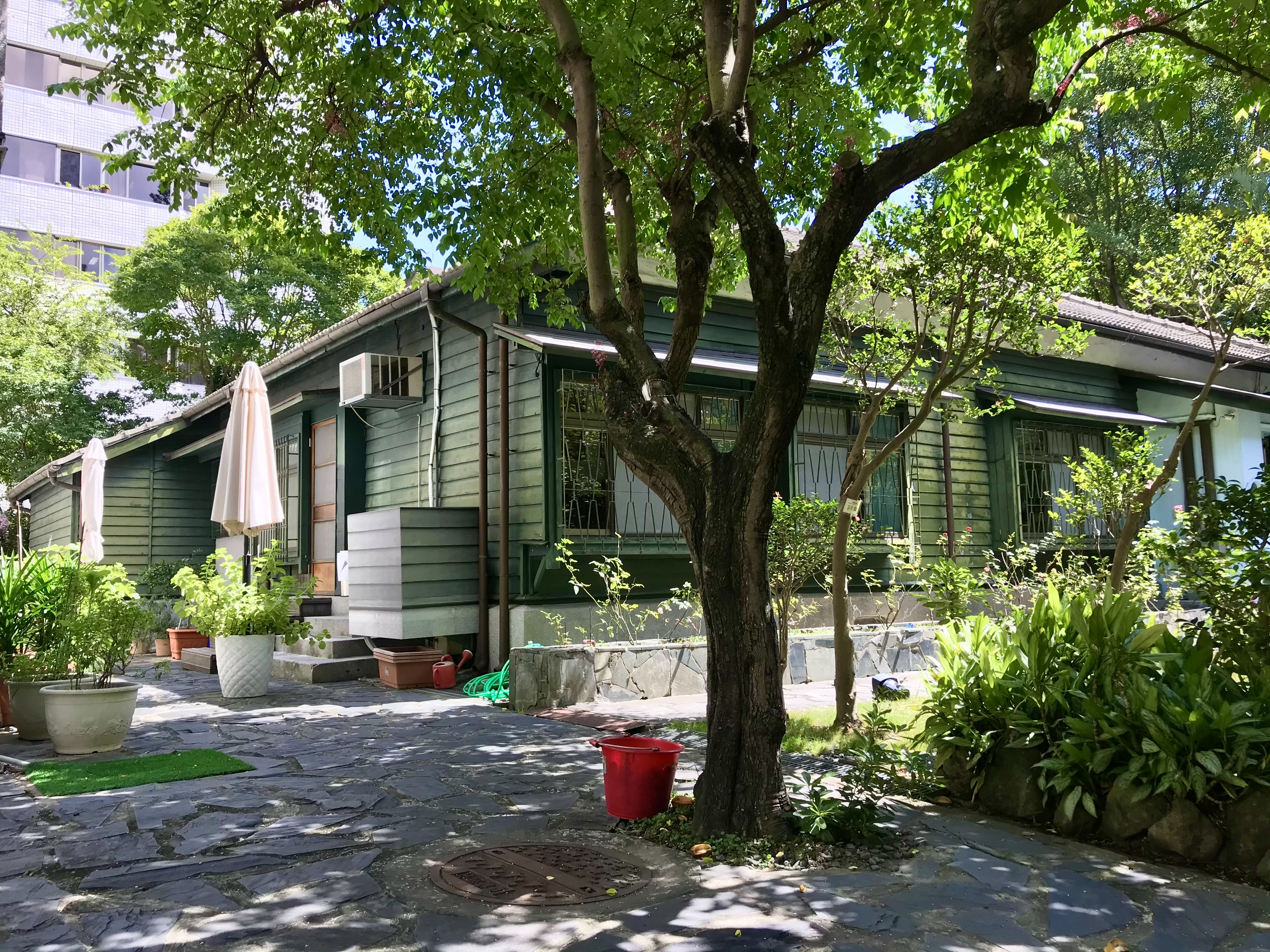
- Interactive map of the Li Kwoh-ting's Residence area

General information
- Type: former house
- Location: Zhongzheng, Taipei, Taiwan
- Coordinates: 25°02′26.2″N 121°31′39.7″E

Technical details
- Floor area: 136 m^{2}

The Li Kwoh-ting's Residence (traditional Chinese: 李國鼎故居; simplified Chinese: 李国鼎故居; pinyin: Lǐ Guódǐng Gùjū) is a former house of Li Kwoh-ting in Zhongzheng District, Taipei, Taiwan.

== History ==
Li moved to the house in 1972 after he was appointed Minister of Finance by President Chiang Kai-shek in 1969. He lived in the house until his death on 31 May 2001. In 2002, the house was listed as historical building by Taipei City Government.

== Architecture ==
The house was designed with Japanese architectural style. The building consists of living room, dining room, bedroom and two study rooms.

== Transportation ==
The house is accessible within walking distance southwest from Zhongxiao Xinsheng Station of Taipei Metro.

== See also ==
- List of tourist attractions in Taiwan
