= Zhongxiao Xinsheng metro station =

Metro station in Taipei, Taiwan

Zhongxiao Xinsheng / 忠孝新生
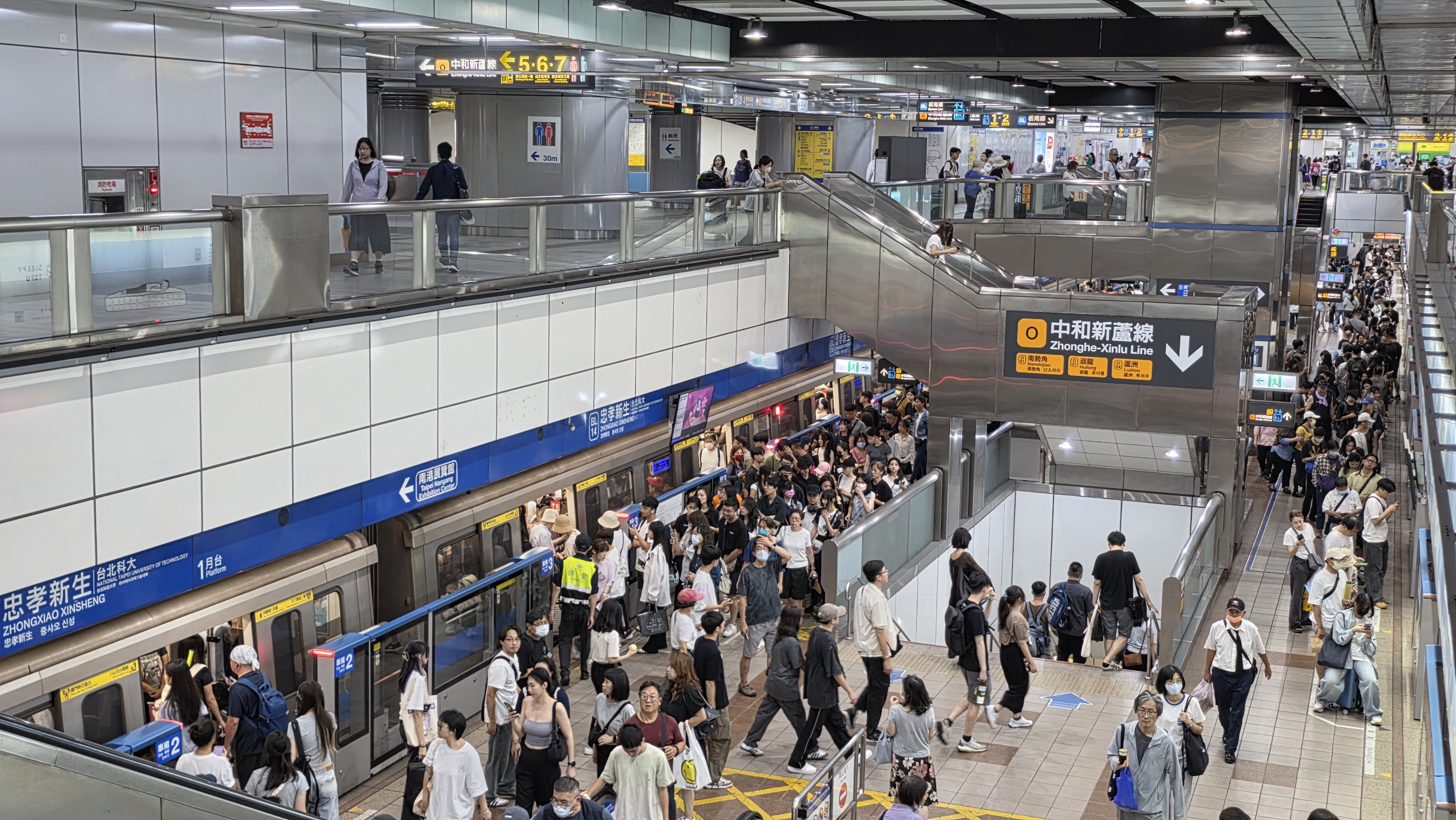
- Bannan Line platform, September 6, 2025

Chinese name
- Chinese: 忠孝新生
Transcriptions
Standard Mandarin
- Hanyu Pinyin: Zhōngxiào Xīnshēng
- Bopomofo: ㄓㄨㄥ ㄒㄧㄠˋ ㄒㄧㄣ ㄕㄥ
- Wade–Giles: Chung¹-hsiao⁴ Hsin¹-sheng¹
Hakka
- Pha̍k-fa-sṳ: Chûng-hau Sîn-sâng
Southern Min
- Tâi-lô: Tiong-hàu Sin-sing

General information
- Location: 67 Sec 1 Xinsheng S Rd; Zhongzheng and Da'an, Taipei; Taiwan
- Coordinates: 25.0418°N 121.5329°E
- System: Taipei Metro station
- Lines: Zhonghe–Xinlu line Bannan line

Construction
- Structure type: Underground
- Cycle facilities: No access

Other information
- Station code: ,
- Website: web.metro.taipei/e/stationdetail2010.asp?ID=BL14+O07-089

History
- Opened: 1999-12-24

Key dates
- 2010-11-03: Zhonghe–Xinlu line added

Passengers
- 2017: 22.997 million per year ▼4.28%
- Rank: (Ranked 11 of 119)

Services
Preceding station	Taipei Metro	Following station
Dongmen towards Nanshijiao	Zhonghe–Xinlu line	Songjiang Nanjing towards Huilong or Luzhou
Shandao Temple towards Dingpu	Bannan line	Zhongxiao Fuxing towards Nangang Exhib Center
Location

Zhongxiao Xinsheng (Chinese: 忠孝新生, formerly transliterated as Chunghsiao Hsinsheng Station until 2003) is a metro station in Taipei, Taiwan served by the Taipei Metro. It is a transfer station between the Zhonghe–Xinlu line and Bannan line.

== Station overview ==
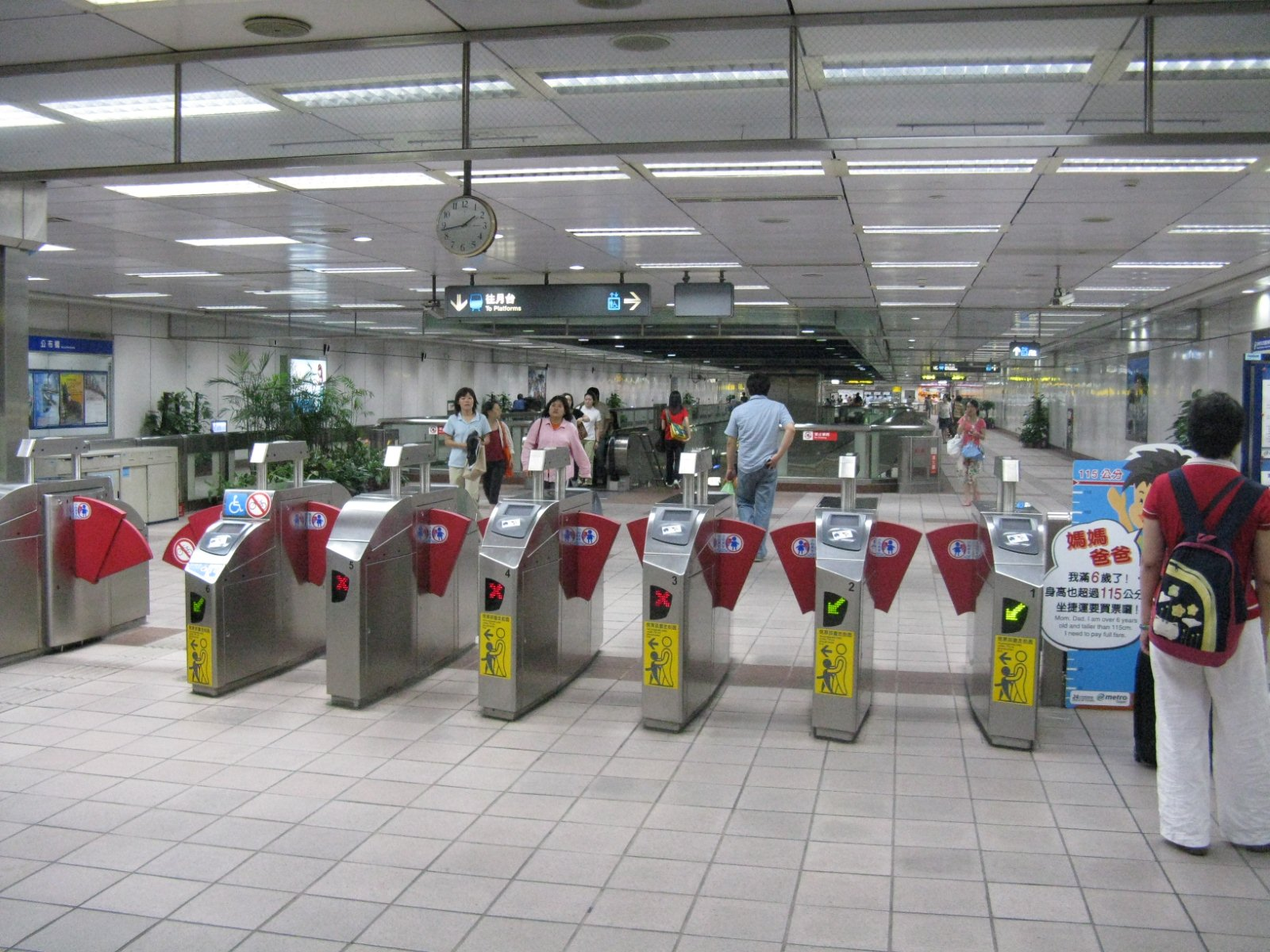
Station faregates

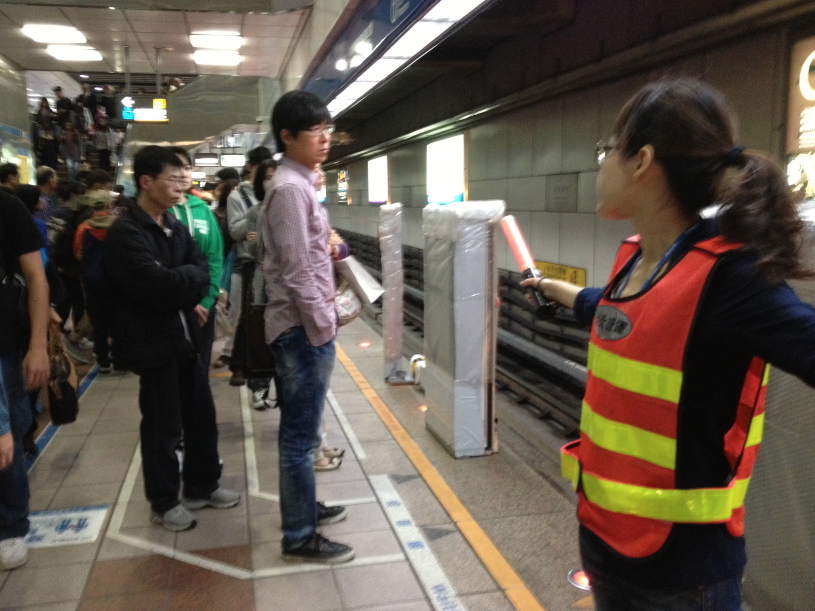
Installation of platform edge doors on Blue line platform

This is a three-level, underground station with two island platforms and seven exits. It is located at the intersection of Zhongxiao East Road and Xinsheng South Road, hence the name of the station. Because space was reserved for the Xinzhuang line (B3) during construction of the Nangang line (B2), there is a direct transfer between the two lines using the pathway between B2 and B3.

== Construction ==
The Xinzhuang Line station is 317.6 meters long, 16.5-32.65 meters wide, and 25.5 meters deep.

The station is centered on a theme of "Modernization and High-tech", with glass and metallic materials utilized in the station design.

== History ==
- 24 December 1999: Opens for service with the opening of the segment from Taipei City Hall to Longshan Temple.
- 3 November 2010: Service of the Xinzhuang line segment to Luzhou begins.
- 30 September 2012: The Xinzhuang Line section from Zhongxiao Xinsheng to Guting is opened for service, allowing for through service to the Zhonghe Line.

== Station layout ==
L1	Street level	Entrance/exit
B1	Concourse	Lobby, information desk, automatic ticket dispensing machines, one-way faregates Restrooms (inside fare zone, middle of the station; outside fare zone, near exit 2), shops, ATM
B2	Platform 1	← Bannan line toward Nangang Exhib Center / Kunyang (BL15 Zhongxiao Fuxing)
B2	Island platform, doors will open on the left
B2	Platform 2	Bannan line toward Dingpu / Far Eastern Hospital (BL13 Shandao Temple) →
B3	Platform 3	← Zhonghe–Xinlu line toward Luzhou / Huilong (O08 Songjiang Nanjing)
B3	Island platform, doors will open on the left
B3	Platform 4	Zhonghe–Xinlu line toward Nanshijiao (O06 Dongmen) →

=== Exits ===
- Exit 1: Zhongxiao Elementary School
- Exit 2: Zhongxiao Park
- Exit 3: Zhongxiao E. Rd. Sec. 3
- Exit 4: National Taipei University of Technology
- Exit 5: Intersection of Xinsheng S. Rd. and Jinan Rd.
- Exit 6: Taipei Methodist Church
- Exit 7: Xinsheng S. Rd. Sec. 1, in front of the Securities and Futures Building

== Around the station ==
- Guang Hua Digital Plaza
- Huashan 1914 Creative Park
- Kwoh-ting Li's Residence
- National Taipei University of Technology
- Qidong Street Japanese Houses (Taipei Qin Hall)
- Securities and Futures Bureau
- Suho Memorial Paper Museum
- Syntrend Creative Park
- Lianyun Park (between this station and Dongmen metro station)
- Zhongxiao Elementary School
- Securities and Futures Bureau
- Chunghwa Post Co., Ltd.
- Taipei Academy of Banking and Finance
