= Shandao Temple metro station =

Metro station in Taipei, Taiwan

Coordinates: 25.044716°N 121.523651°E

Shandao Temple (Huashan) 善導寺（華山）
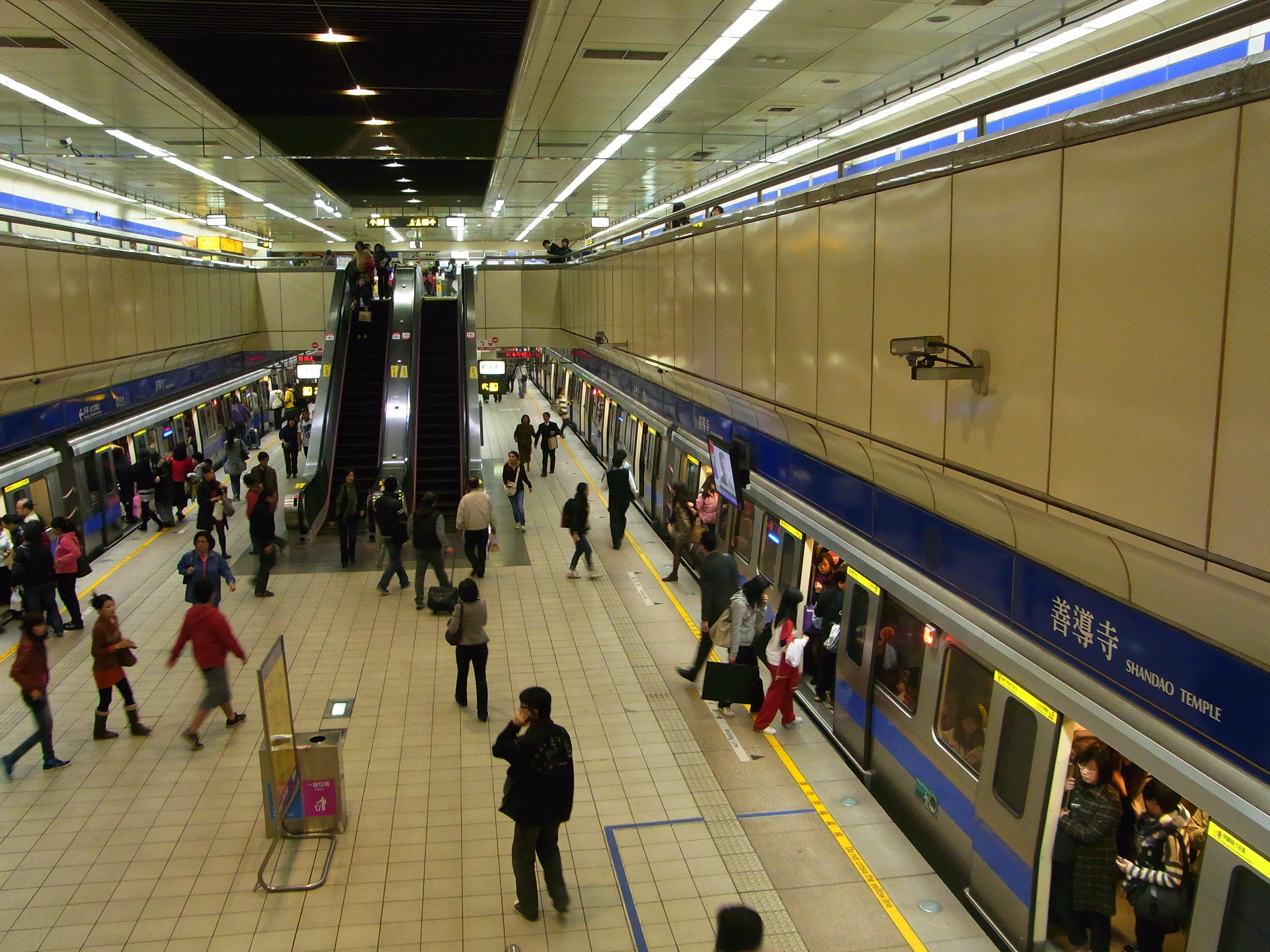
- Shandao Temple station platform

Chinese name
- Traditional Chinese: 善導寺
- Simplified Chinese: 善导寺
Transcriptions
Standard Mandarin
- Hanyu Pinyin: Shàndǎo Sì
- Bopomofo: ㄕㄢˋ ㄉㄠˇ ㄙˋ
- Wade–Giles: Shan⁴-tao³ Si⁴
Hakka
- Pha̍k-fa-sṳ: San-thô Sṳ
Southern Min
- Tâi-lô: Siān-tō-sī

General information
- Location: B1F 58 Sec 1 Zhongxiao E Rd; Zhongzheng, Taipei; Taiwan
- Operated by: Taipei Metro
- Line: Bannan line (BL13)
- Connections: Bus stop

Construction
- Structure type: Underground

Other information
- Station code: BL13

History
- Opened: 1999-12-24

Passengers
- daily (December 2024) (Ranked 35 of 119)

Services
Preceding station	Taipei Metro	Following station
Taipei Main Station towards Dingpu	Bannan line	Zhongxiao Xinsheng towards Nangang Exhib Center
Location

Shandao Temple (formerly transliterated as Shantao Temple Station until 2003), secondary station name Huashan, is a station on the Bannan line of Taipei Metro in Zhongzheng District, Taipei, Taiwan. It is named after the Shandao Temple.

== Station overview ==
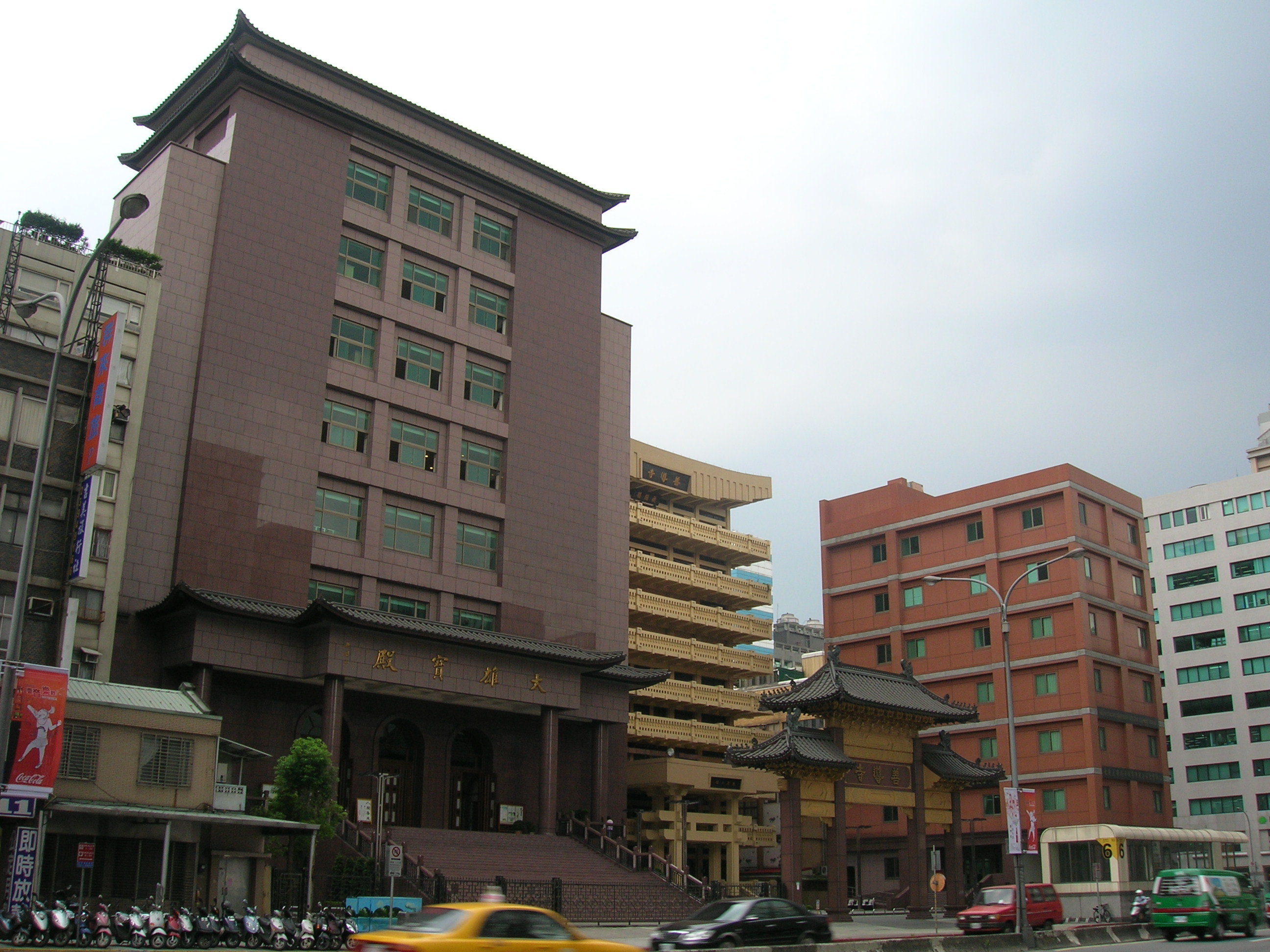
Shandao Temple, the namesake of the station, with exit 6 in front

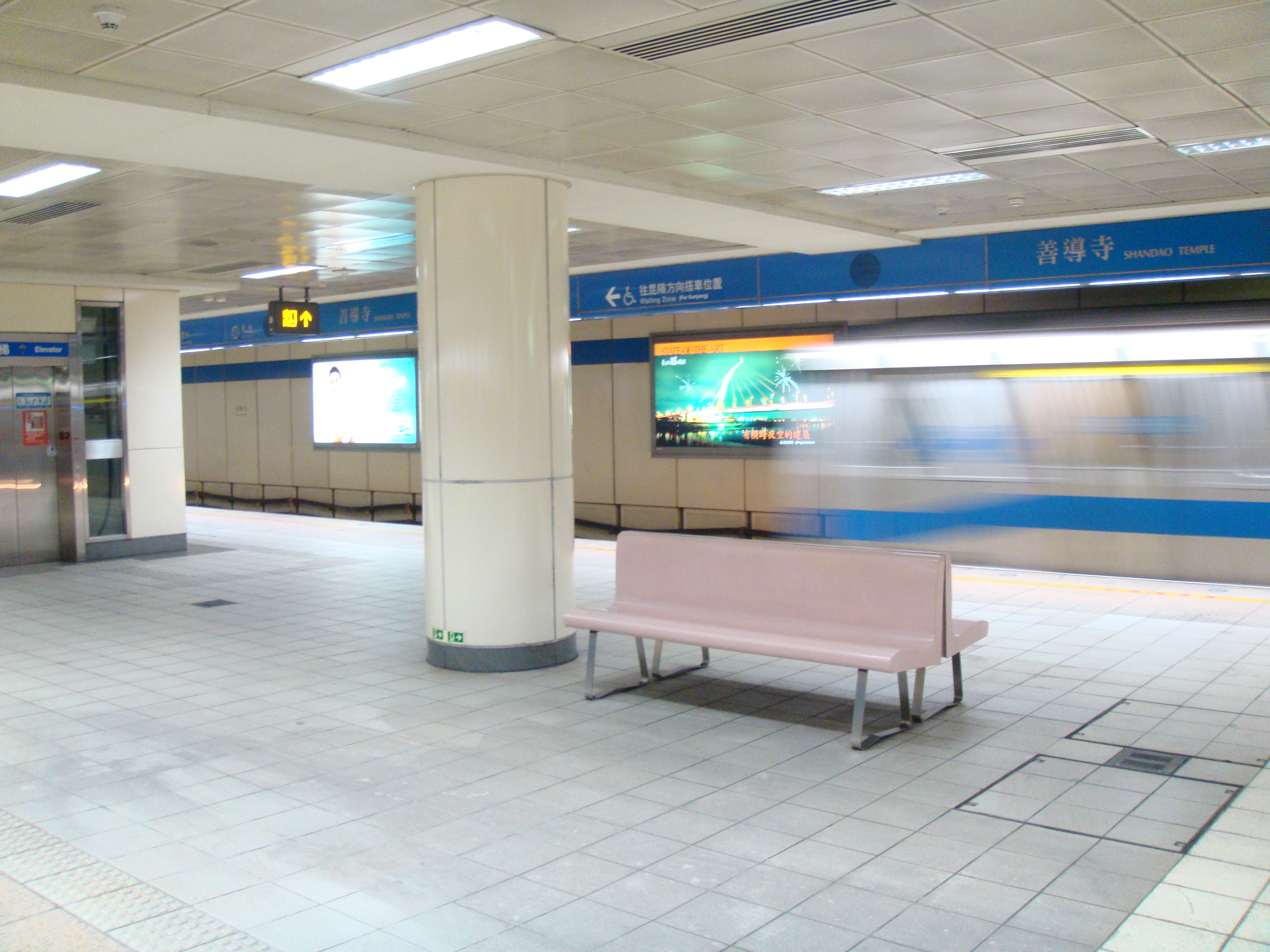
A train approaching Shandao Temple station

This two-level, underground station has an island platform and six exits. It is located at the intersection of Zhongxiao East Road and Linsen Road. It is a relatively quiet station on a busy metro line.

== Station layout ==
Street level	Entrance/exit	Entrance/exit
B1	Concourse	Lobby, information desk, automatic ticket dispensing machines, one-way faregates Restrooms (outside fare zone, near exit 1 and 2)
B2	Platform 1	← Bannan line toward Nangang Exhib Center / Kunyang (BL14 Zhongxiao Xinsheng)
B2	Island platform, doors will open on the left
B2	Platform 2	→ Bannan line toward Dingpu / Far Eastern Hospital (BL12 Taipei Main Station) →

=== Exits ===
- Exit 1: National Police Agency
- Exit 2: Intersection of Zhongxiao E. Rd. Sec. 1 and Linsen S. Rd., south side of Zhongxiao E. Rd. Sec. 1
- Exit 3: Lane 58, Zhongxiao E. Rd. Sec. 1, south side of Zhongxiao E. Rd. Sec. 1
- Exit 4: Qingdao Public Housing
- Exit 5: Huashan Market
- Exit 6: Shandao Temple

== Around the station ==
- Insect Science Museum
- Mayor's Residence Art Salon
- Sheraton Grand Taipei Hotel
- Taiwan Film and Audiovisual Institute
