= Syntrend Creative Park =

Shopping mall in Zhongzheng, Taipei, Taiwan

- 三創數位生活園區

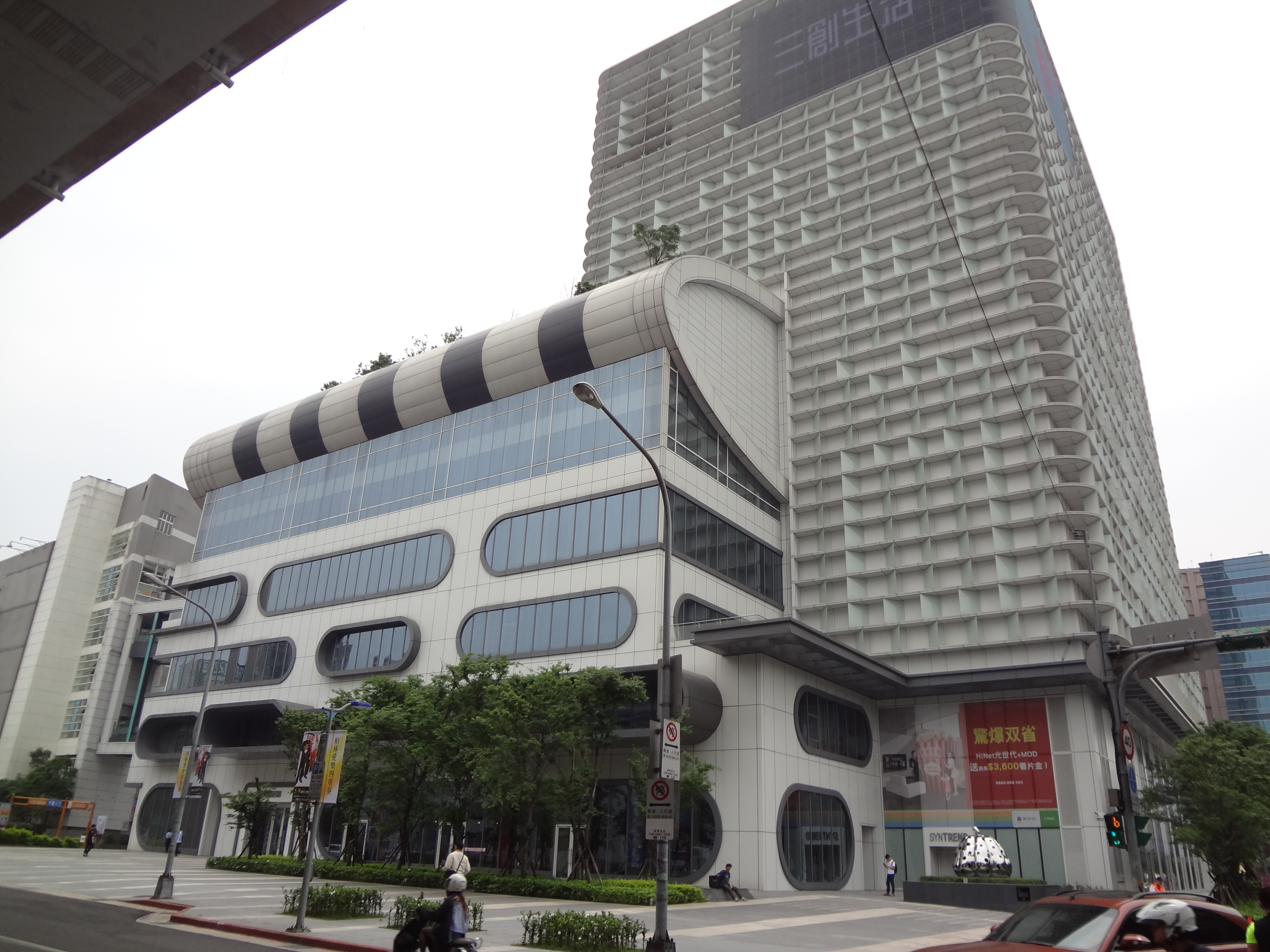
- Location: Zhongzheng, Taipei, Taiwan
- Coordinates: 25°2′43″N 121°31′51.7″E
- Opened: 15 May 2015
- Architect: Shopping mall
- Floor area: 8,100 m^{2}
- Floors: 12
- Website: Official website

The Syntrend Creative Park (traditional Chinese: 三創數位生活園區; simplified Chinese: 三创数位生活园区; pinyin: Sānchuàng Shùwèi Shēnghuó Yuánqū) is a shopping mall in Zhongzheng District, Taipei, Taiwan. The shopping mall opened on 15 May 2015 with 8,100 m^{2} of floor space on 12 floors. It is within walking distance northwest of Zhongxiao Xinsheng Station of Taipei Metro. The name Syntrend was chosen to signify creativity, innovation and entrepreneurship.

== See also ==
- List of tourist attractions in Taiwan
