= Nanmen =

Nanmen (Chinese: 南門; lit. 'South Gate') may refer to the following:

- Nanmen station, a station in Suzhou Rail Transit
- Chiang Kai-shek Memorial Hall metro station, or Nanmen, a station in the Taipei MRT

== See also ==
- Beimen (disambiguation)
- Dongmen (disambiguation)
- Xiaonanmen Station (disambiguation)
- Ximen
