= Beimen metro station =

Metro station in Datong, Taipei, Taiwan

Beimen 北門
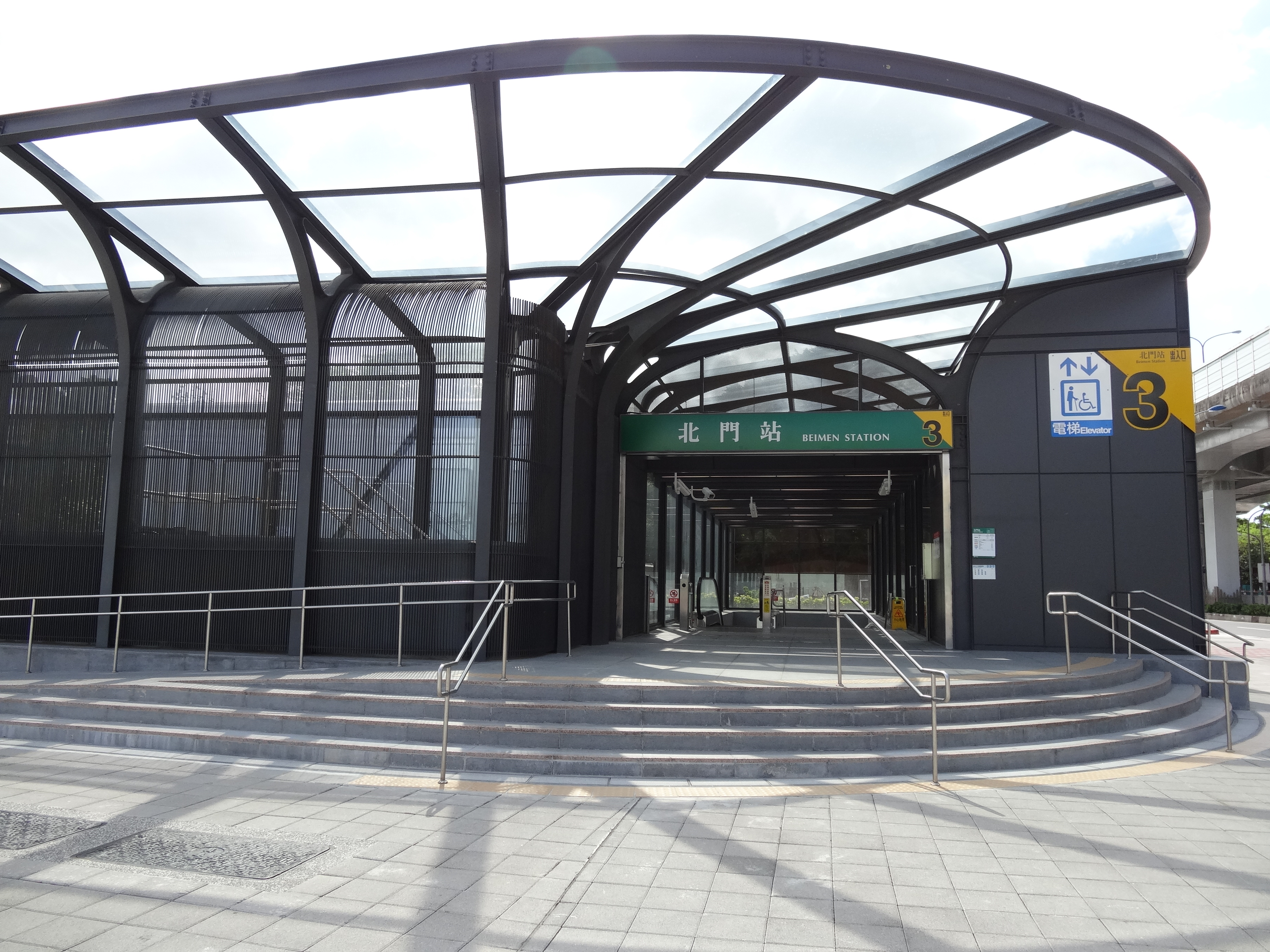

Chinese name
- Traditional Chinese: 北門
- Simplified Chinese: 北门
- Literal meaning: North Gate
Transcriptions
Standard Mandarin
- Hanyu Pinyin: Běimén
- Wade–Giles: Pei³-men²
Hakka
- Pha̍k-fa-sṳ: Pet-mùn
Southern Min
- Tâi-lô: Pak-mn̂g

General information
- Location: Datong, Taipei; Taiwan
- Coordinates: 25°02′58.0″N 121°30′37.1″E
- Operator: Taipei Metro
- Line: Songshan–Xindian line
- Connections: 300 m: Taoyuan Airport MRT (A1 Taipei Main Station)

Construction
- Structure type: Underground

Other information
- Station code: G13

History
- Opened: November 15, 2014; 11 years ago

Passengers
- 35,575 daily (December 2024)
- Rank: 71 out of 109 and 5 others

Services
Preceding station	Taipei Metro	Following station
Zhongshan towards Songshan	Songshan–Xindian line	Ximen towards Taipower Building or Xindian
Preceding station	Taoyuan Metro	Following station
Terminus	Taoyuan Airport MRT Express transfer at Taipei Main Station	New Taipei Industrial Park towards Airport Terminal 2 or Huanbei
Terminus	Taoyuan Airport MRT Commuter transfer at Taipei Main Station	Sanchong towards Laojie River
Location

The Taipei Metro Beimen station is a station on the Songshan–Xindian line located in Datong District, Taipei City, Taiwan.

== Station overview ==
This four-level, underground station has two side platforms. It is located beneath Tacheng St., Civic Blvd., and Zhongxiao West Rd. It was scheduled to open in December 2013 with the launch of the Songshan line. However, the opening of Beimen station was delayed until November 15, 2014.

The southeastern part of the station connects to the Taipei City Mall, which connects through to Taipei Main Station.

=== Public art ===
The theme for this station is "Bearing Grace and Inaugurating Vision". It uses silhouette carvings to represent historical images of Old Taipei, Beimen station, and the history of railway transportation. Artworks include "The Gate of Taipei City", "Bearing Grace" series, "Locomotives" in the "Inaugurating Vision" series, and historical photos of Taipei.

== History ==
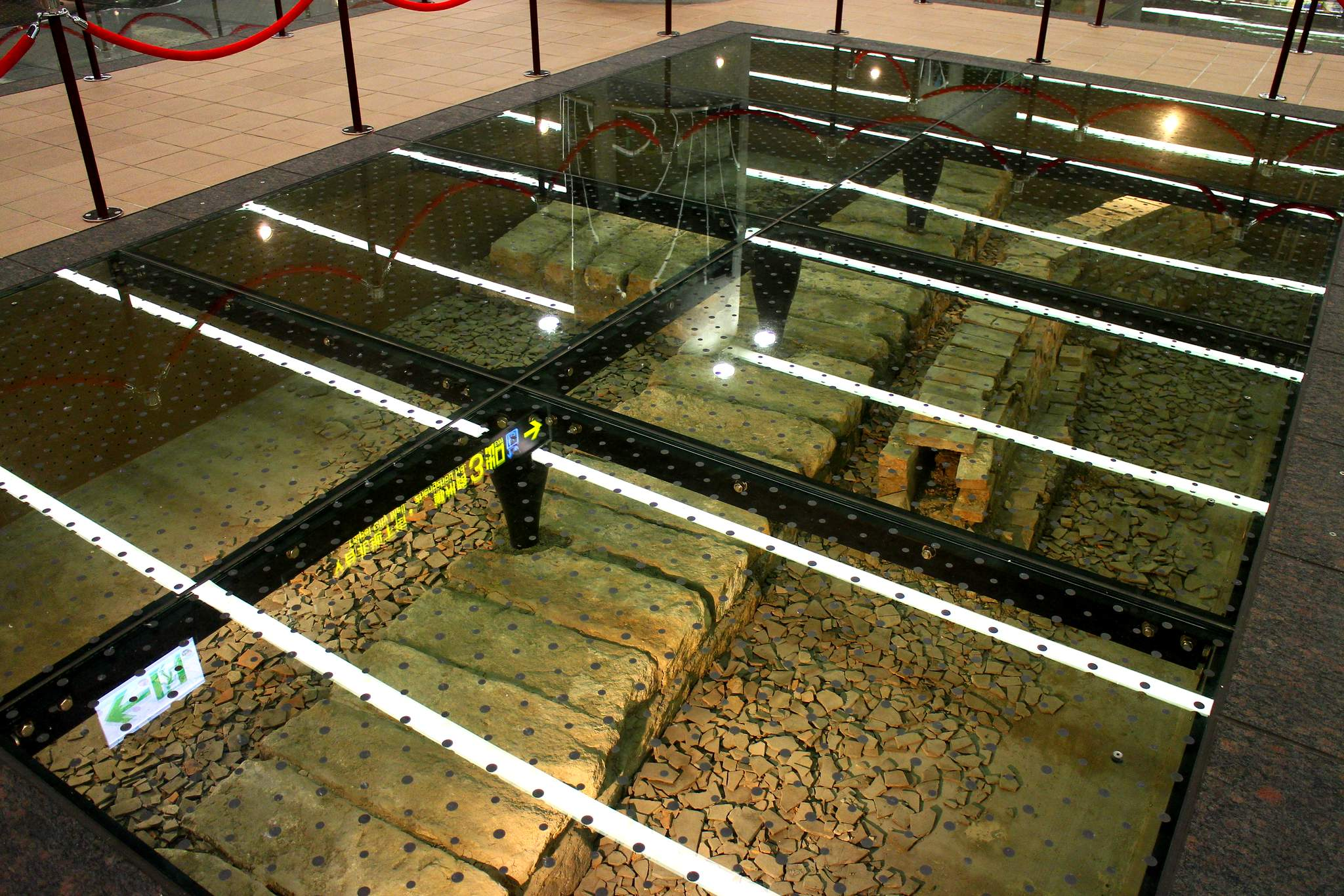
Historical excavations on display at Beimen station

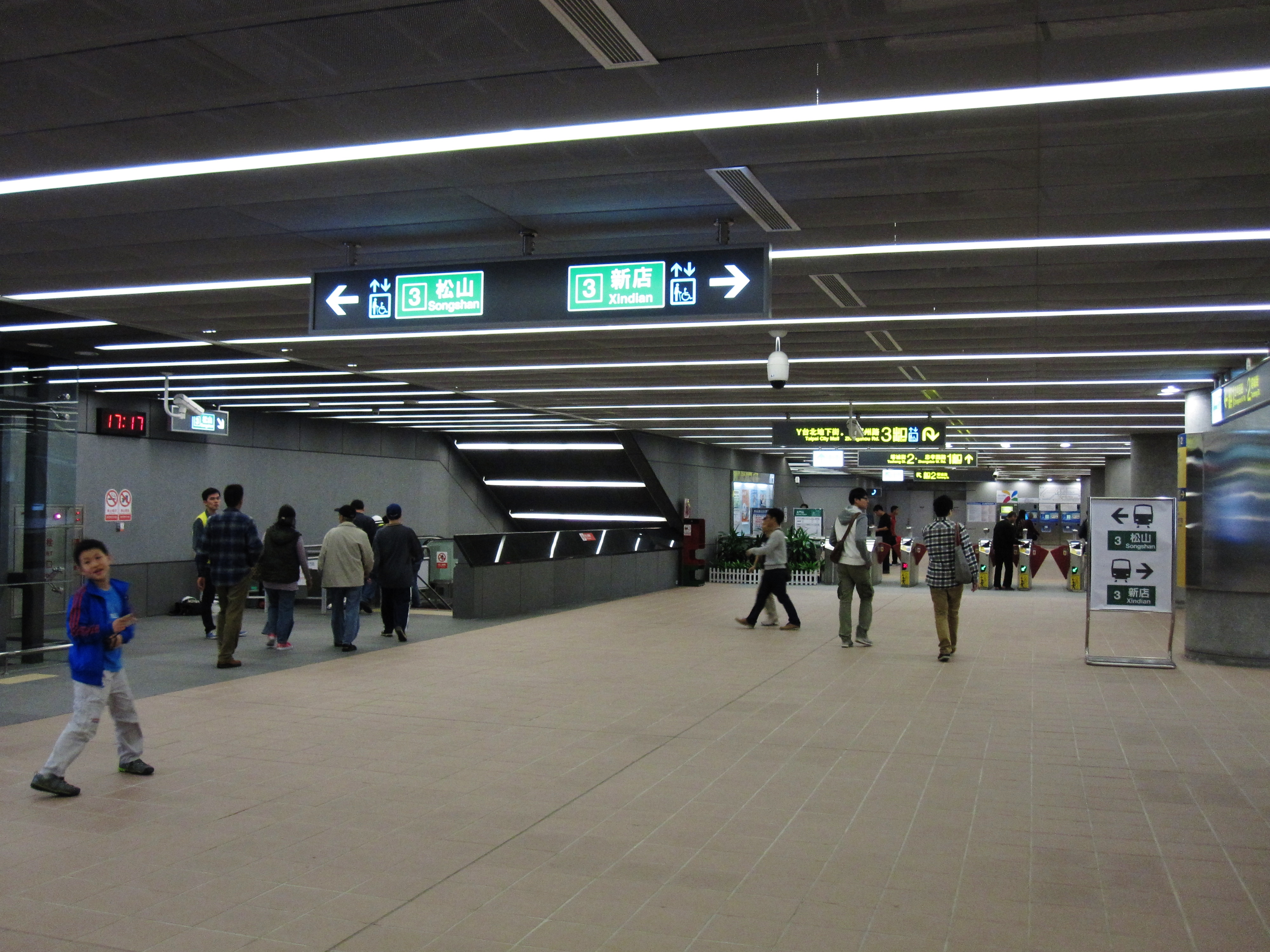
Station lobby and concourse

Beimen station was originally known as Hokumon station (北門駅, Hokumon-eki), and opened east of the old Taiwan Railway Administration building on August 17, 1915. It was a terminus for the Tamsui line. It was an at-grade station with side platforms. This station was closed on March 6, 1923.

The Taipei Metro station opened on November 15, 2014.

== Construction ==
Excavation depth for this station is around 32 m (105 ft 0 in). It is 171 m (561 ft 0 in) in length and 32 m (105 ft 0 in) wide. It has four exits, one of which is integrated with the South Wing of the National Taiwan Museum.

Taipei Workshop, a Grade 3 historical monument constructed during the era of Japanese rule, was exactly where the future Beimen station would be located. Thus, a removal project commenced on October 20, 2006, to temporarily move the structure until construction of both the Songshan line and the Taoyuan Airport MRT was completed. The building was moved 30 meters (98 ft 5 in) to the southeast, and was moved back when construction was completed.

== Station layout ==
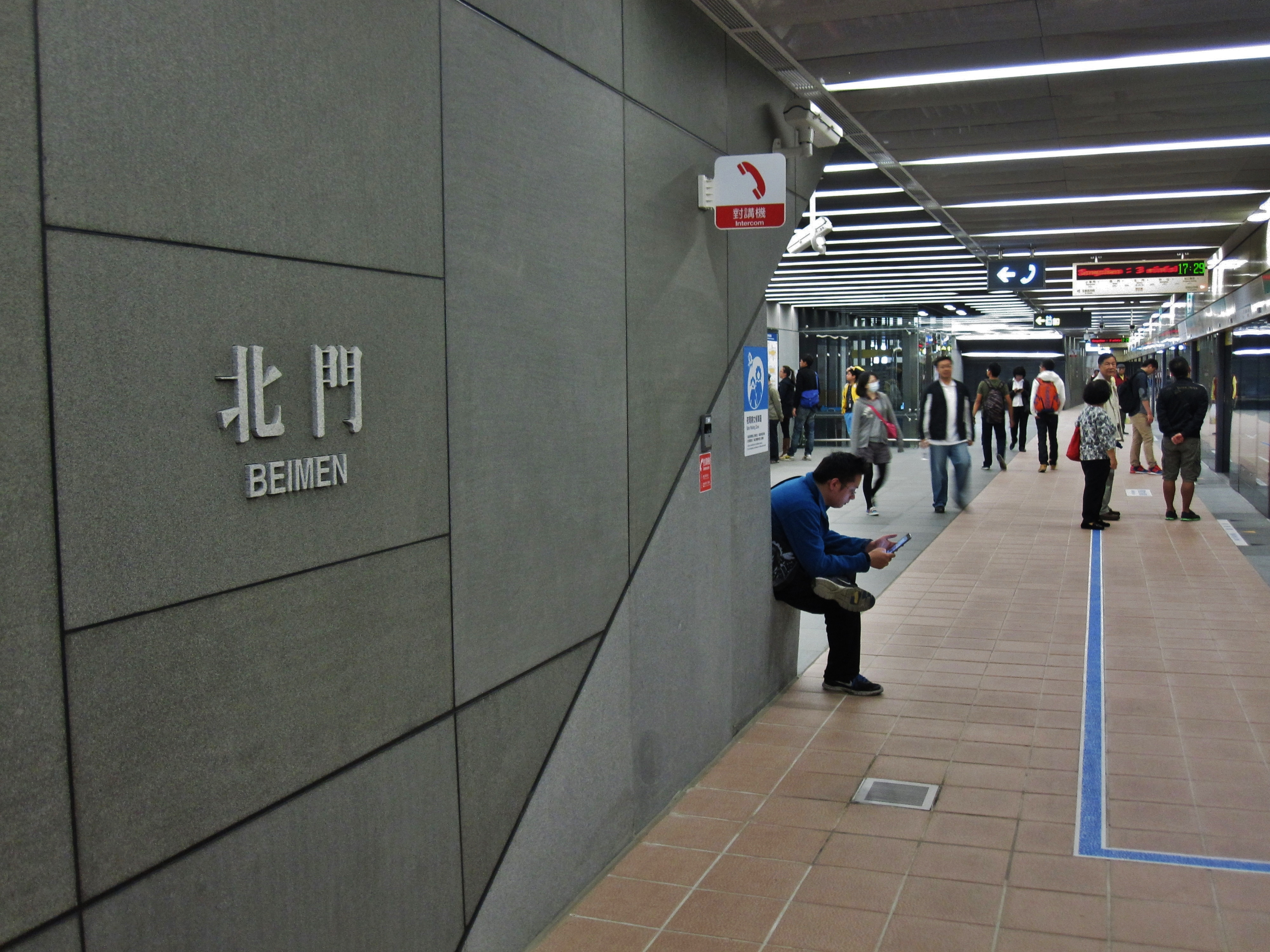
Platform

Street level	Exit
B1	Underground Level	Interlinked Taipei Underground Market, Taipei Main Station, Taoyuan International Airport MRT
B2	Concourse	Lobby, information desk, automatic ticket dispensing machines, one-way faregates
B2	Concourse	Restrooms
B4
B4	Side platform, doors open on the right
B4	Platform 1	← Songshan–Xindian line toward Songshan (G14 Zhongshan)
B4	Platform 2	→ Songshan–Xindian line toward Xindian / Taipower Building (G12 Ximen) →
B4	Side platform, doors open on the right

== Around the station ==
- Dadaocheng Wharf
- Taipei North Gate
- Railway Department of the Office of the Governor-General of Taiwan historic site
- Old Taipei Railway Workshop
- Taipei Post Office
