= Old Taipei Railway Workshop =

Factory

- 臺北工場
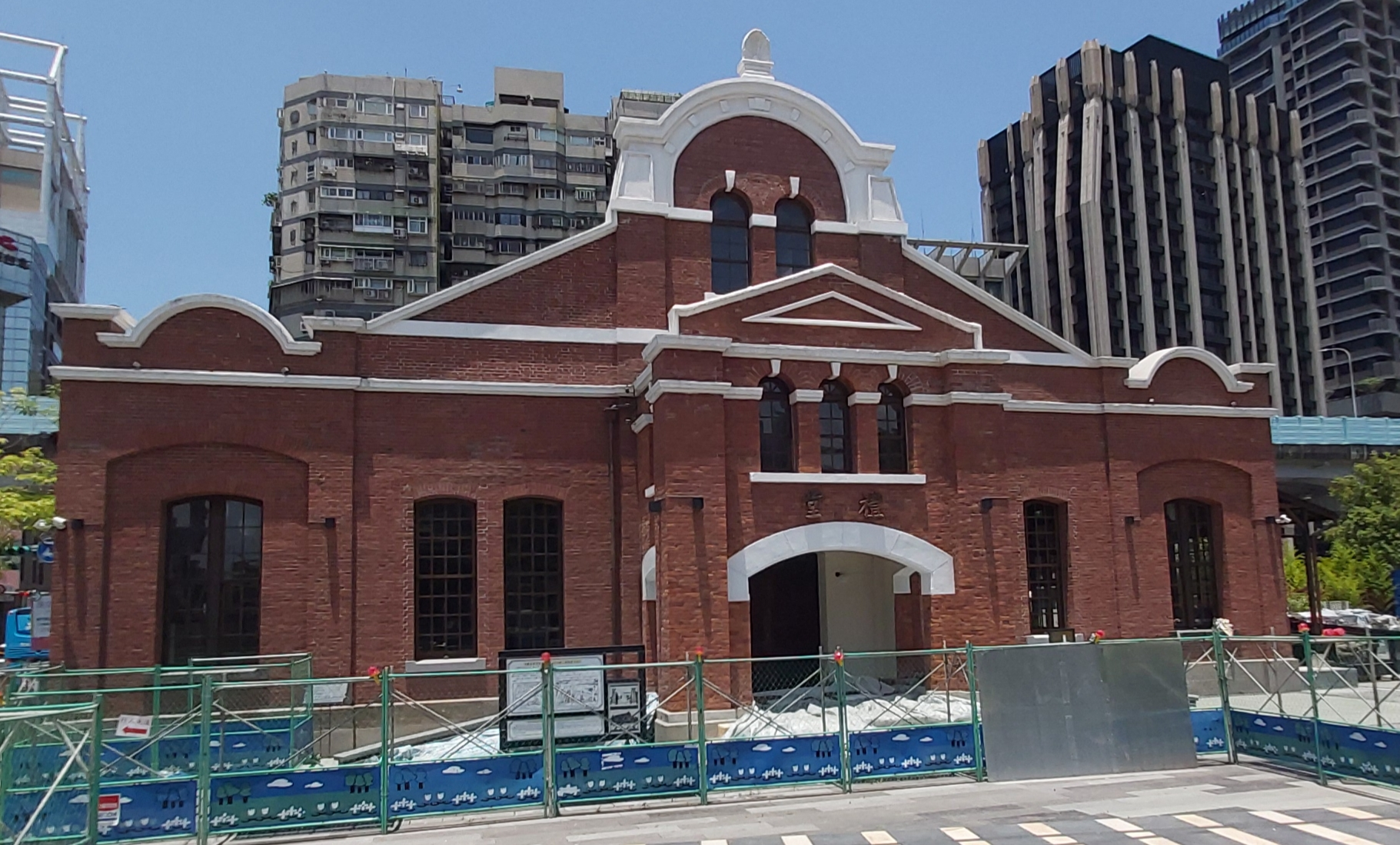
- Interactive map of the Old Taipei Railway Workshop area

General information
- Location: Datong, Taipei
- Coordinates: 25°02′59″N 121°30′38″E
- Completed: 1909

Old Taipei Railway Workshop was a railway vehicle assembly and maintenance workshop administered by the Railway Department of the Office of the Governor-General of Taiwan during the Japanese colonial period. After relocating to Taipei Railway Workshop in Songshan in 1934, the original premises was gradually modified to offices for the other units of the Railway Department or to employee dormitories for the Railway Department. Most of the original workshop buildings have been completely demolished and no longer exist.

The Old Taipei Railway Workshop today is the "Vehicle Maintenance Workshop" built during the eastward expansion of the Taipei Railway Workshop in 1909. After World War II, it was mainly used as the auditorium for the Taiwan Railway Administration (TRA) and was designated as a historic site at the Taipei Municipality Level in 2005.

== Background ==
In the early days of the Japanese colonial rule, the "Taipei Train Shed" roundhouse in Dadaocheng was used for a short time by the Railway Department for railway vehicle assembly and maintenance. The Taipei Weaponry Repair Center, which was handed over by the Taipei Machinery Bureau of the Qing Dynasty, also had several of its buildings on the north side borrowed by the Railway Department.

In 1899, the Taipei Weaponry Repair Center was renamed to the Taipei Artillery Factory. In 1900, the Taipei Artillery Factory was handed over to the Railway Department for use as a railway workshop. This workshop in Taipei was established as the Taipei Workshop, then followed by Takow Workshop being established in 1901, and Hualien Port Workshop being established in 1918.

In December 1924, the Transportation Bureau was established above the Railway Department to support the administrative restructuring of the Office of the Governor-General of Taiwan. This placed the Taipei Workshop, Takow Workshop and Hualien Port Workshop directly under the management of the Transportation Bureau. In 1926, the workshops were renamed to Taipei Railway Workshop, Kaohsiung Railway Workshop, and Hualien Port Railway Workshop respectively.

In 1927, the Hualien Port Railway Workshop was merged into the Hualien Branch Office of the Railway Department, and was renamed to Hualien Port Repair Workshop. Until the end of the Japanese colonial rule, Taipei Railway Workshop and Kaohsiung Railway Workshop were directly administered by the Transportation Bureau.

== Development ==
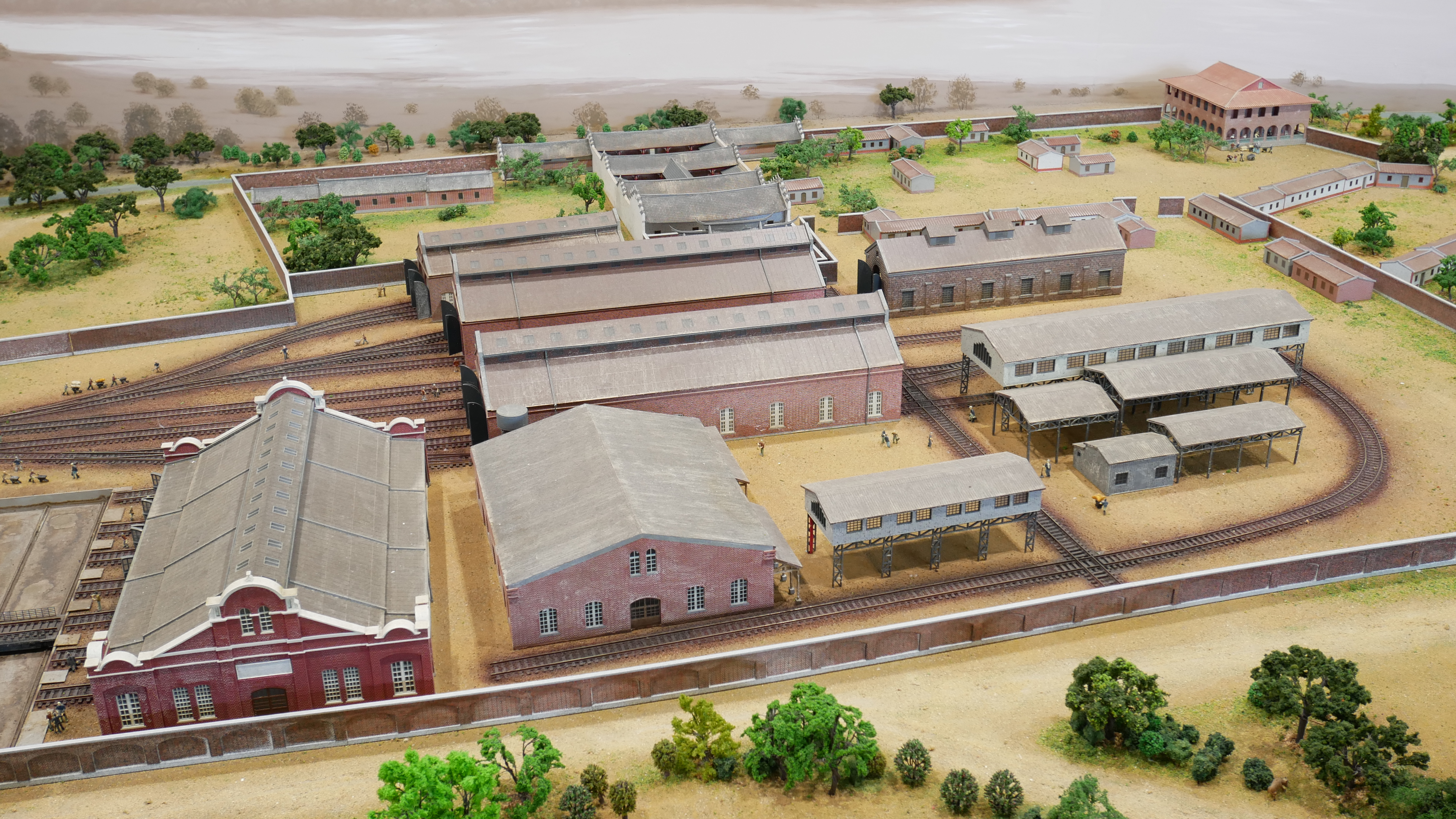
Restored model of the Taipei Railway Workshop in 1910

Before Taipei Railway Workshop was established, the Railway Department was borrowing several buildings on the north side of the Taipei Artillery Factory, to use them for railway vehicle assembly and maintenance work. After the Railway Department took over the Taipei Artillery Factory and established the Taipei Railway Workshop in 1900, they continued using the buildings on the north side. At that time, there were 7 main buildings in the premises. Later, about 5 large and small factory buildings were successively built on the vacant plots of the premises. By 1908, there were 13 main buildings on the premises.

In 1908, the Trunk Line was inaugurated and the demand for railway vehicle maintenance increased. Subsequently, plans were made to expand eastward from the existing premises to construct more workshop buildings . The expansion project was completed in 1909, and the new Vehicle Maintenance Workshop, Coating Workshop, and Vehicle Relocation Platform were built. Among them, the Vehicle Repair Workshop is today's municipality historic site - Old Taipei Railway Workshop.

As the railway industry developed over the years, more buildings were constructed on the premises to meet the growing operations of the workshop. However, it reached a point where there were no available plots in the surrounding area to further expand. So in 1934, the workshop was relocated to the Taipei New Railway Workshop in Songshan due to the space restrictions of the existing premises.

From 1918, the south side of the premises was already used for the administrative headquarters for the Railway Department. After the relocation, the existing workshop buildings built during the eastward expansion in 1909 were used as the offices for the related units of the Railway Department. On the west side of the premises, buildings in this area were demolished. As this area was already surrounded with employee dormitories for the Railway Department, additional dormitories were built in this area.

After World War II, the offices and dormitories of the Railway Department were taken over by the Taiwan Railways Administration, and basically their existing functions were retained.

== Architectural features ==
The Taipei municipality historic site known as Old Taipei Railway Workshop today, was actually the Vehicle Maintenance Workshop within the Taipei Railway Workshop during the Japanese colonial period.

The construction of the building started on May 22, 1909, and was completed on October 31, 1909. An English-style brickwork structure was used for the building, with a width of about 25.77 meters and a length of about 35 meters. There are large semicircular facades for the gables on the south and north sides, arched corridors on the east and west sides, and in the center the main working space of the workshop building is as wide as 17.42 meters.

The roof is equipped with high ventilation windows, which was a common lighting and ventilation design for factory buildings at that time. The iron truss roof is also an important feature, which rail structures were used. The structural form is similar to the structure of the Dadaocheng Taipei Station from the Qing Dynasty. It is speculated that large-scale factory roof trusses in the late Qing Dynasty were used.

After the workshop was moved to Songshan in 1934, the Vehicle Maintenance Workshop was modified to become offices for the Supervision Division and the Transportation Division of the Railway Department. After World War II, it was mainly used as the auditorium for the Taiwan Railway Administration (TRA) starting from June 1949. During this period, a podium was added and related repair projects were done for the change of use. An entrance foyer was added on the south side between 1950 and 1952, with a height of about 2 stories.

Prior to the restoration of the historic site in 2020, the ventilation windows on the roof had already been removed, and the semicircular gable facade on the south side had also already been demolished with another facade replacing it.

Originally there were six pairs of arches along the east and west sides. Using a traverser, the arches allowed six vehicles to enter and exit the workshop. However, in the early 1980s, two pairs of arches on the north side were demolished during the construction of Civic Boulevard, where it attained its current appearance.

== Historic site designation ==
In 2005, the Old Taipei Railway Workshop was designated and added to the Historic Sites of the Taipei Municipality Level, and listed as part of the historic site of the Railway Department, Transportation Bureau, Office of the Governor-General of Taiwan. In 2007, the Cultural Development Committee of the Executive Yuan announced it as a national monument.

In 2010, the Department of Cultural Affairs of Taipei City Government revised the official name of the historical site of the Old Taipei Railway Workshop to the Railway Department, Office of the Governor-General of Taiwan (Taipei Railway Workshop).

== Structure relocation and restoration ==
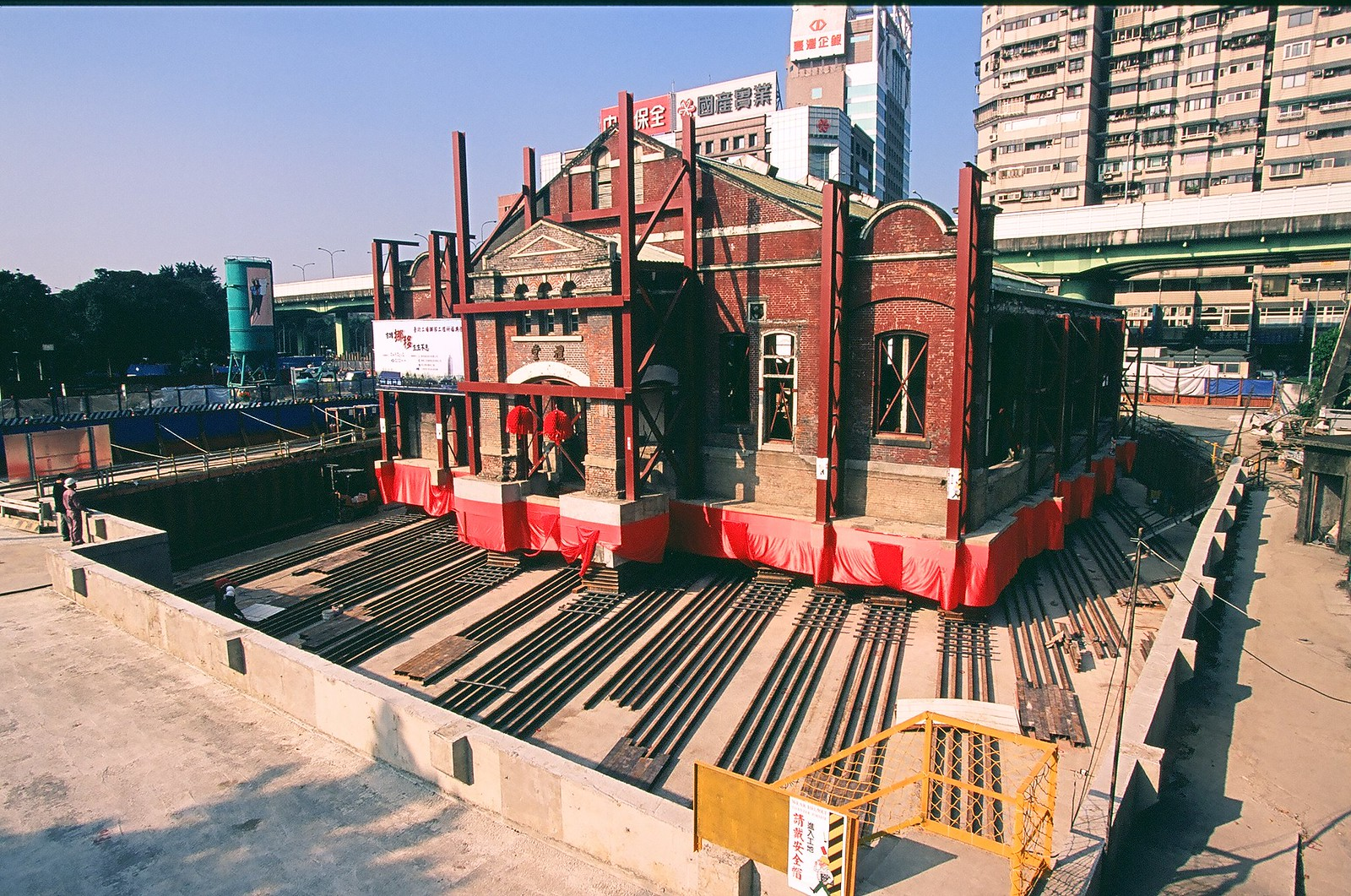
Old Taipei Railway Workshop during its relocation

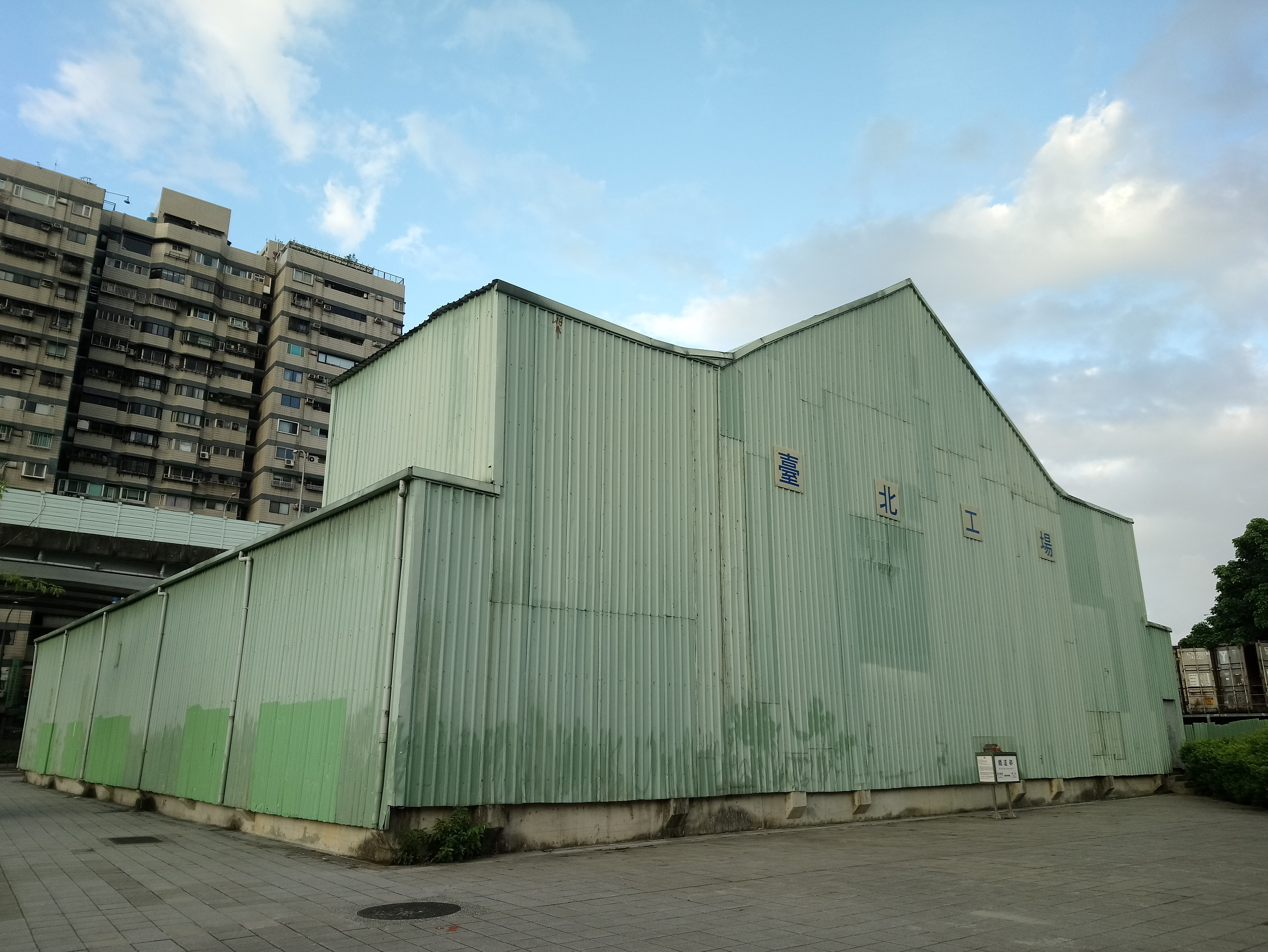
Old Taipei Railway Workshop in its steel shed

In 2007, Taipei Railway Workshop was moved 30 meters to the southeast to accommodate for the construction of the Taoyuan Airport MRT and Beimen Station of the Taipei Metro Songshan Line. It was moved back to the current location in 2012, and a temporary steel shed was constructed around it for protection. However, there is a slight difference between the current location and the original location.

In 2020, the Department of Rapid Transit Systems of the Taipei City Government sponsored and launched a restoration project for the historic site. This was designed and supervised by Hsu Yu-Chien & Associates, Architects, and the project was awarded to Songken Construction Engineering Co., Ltd.
