= Zhangshanying =

Zhangshanying Town 张山营镇
- Town
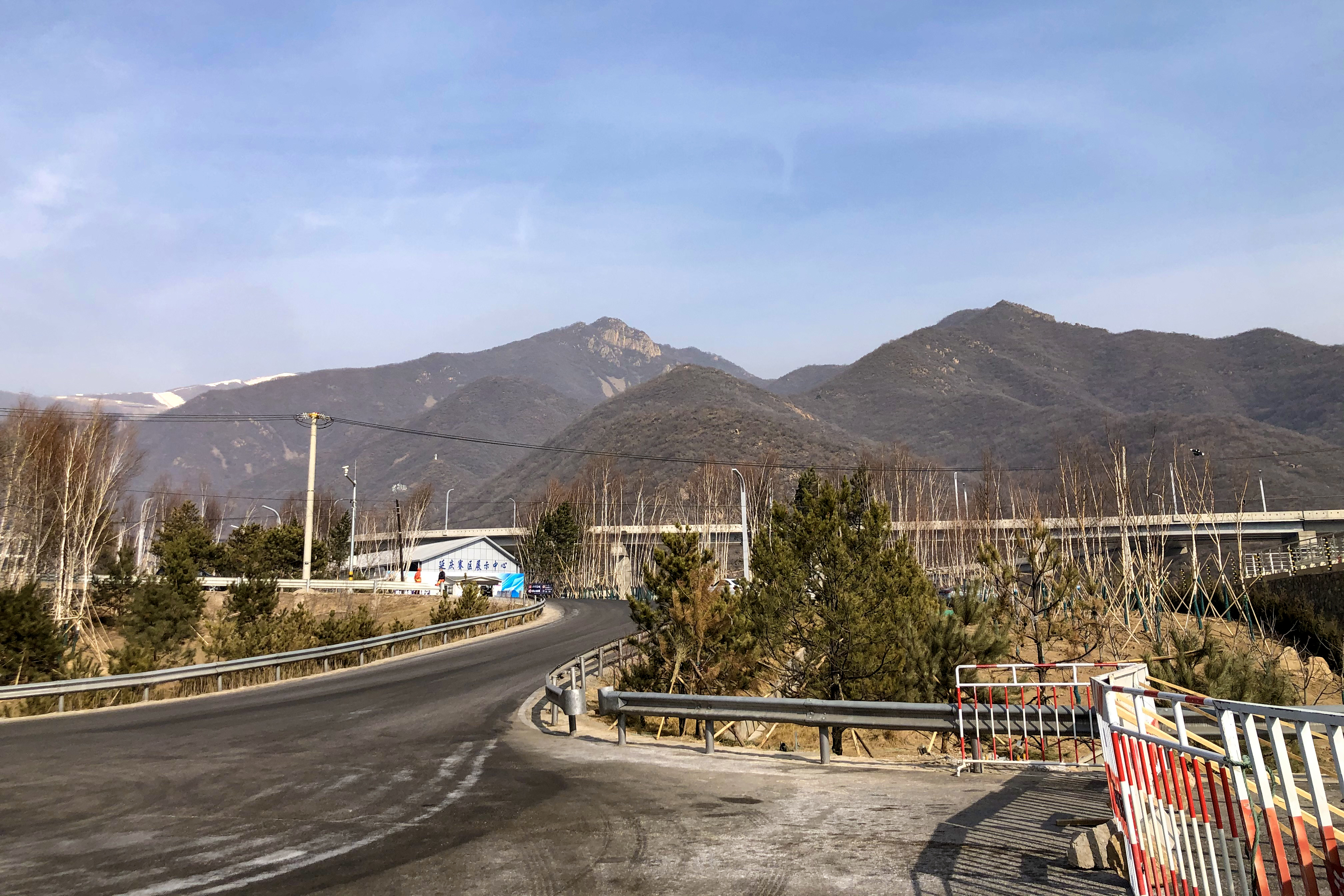
- Mount Haituo within the town, 2021

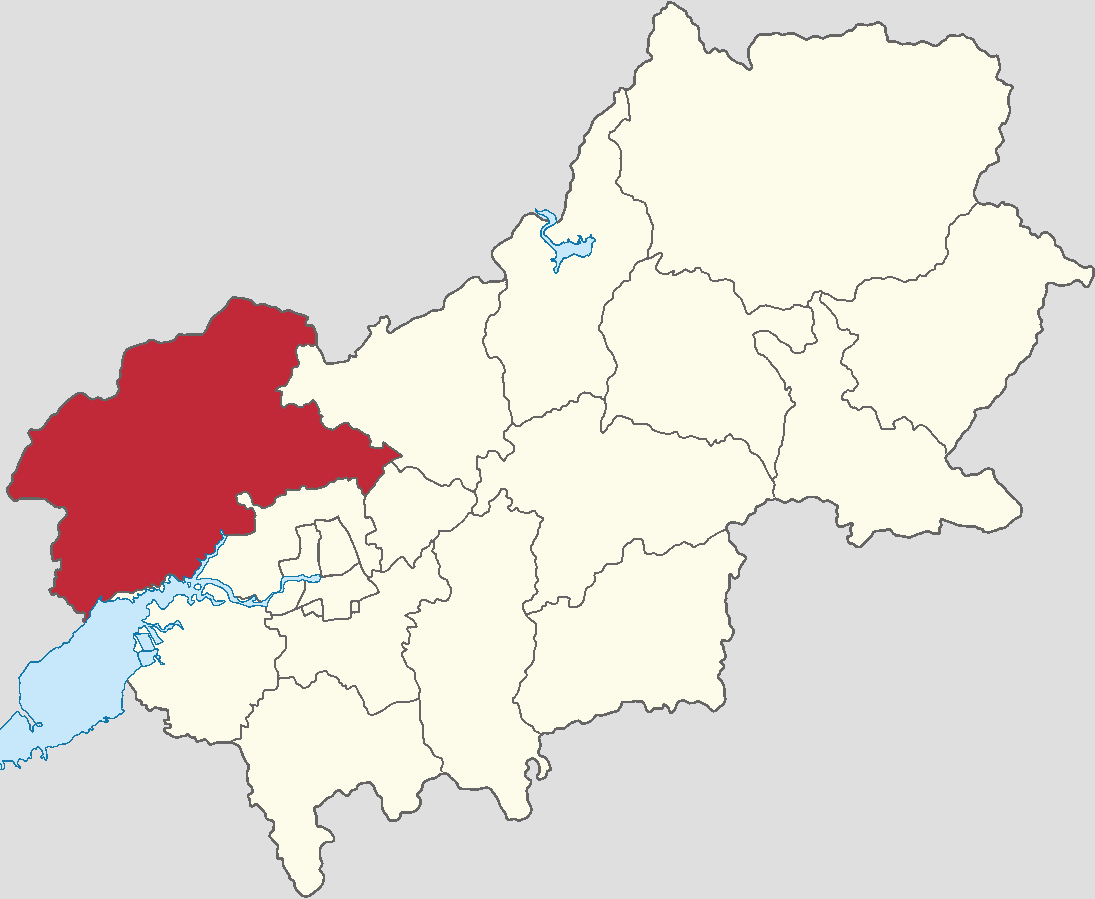
- Location within Yanqing District

- Location within Beijing Location within China
- Coordinates: 40°28′39″N 115°51′03″E
- Country: China
- Municipality: Beijing
- District: Yanqing
- Village-level Divisions: 2 communities 32 villages

Area
  - Total: 261.2 km^{2} (100.8 sq mi)
- Elevation: 525 m (1,722 ft)

Population (2020)
  - Total: 24,259
  - Density: 92.88/km^{2} (240.5/sq mi)
- Time zone: UTC+8 (China Standard)
- Postal code: 102115
- Area code: 010

Zhangshanying Town (simplified Chinese: 张山营镇; traditional Chinese: 張山營鎮; pinyin: Zhāngshānyíng Zhèn) is a town in the Yanqing District of Beijing. It shares border with Dahaituo Township in the north, Jiuxian and Shenjiaying Towns in the east, Yanqing Town in the south, and Beixinpu Town in the west. As of 2020, Zhangshanying had a population of 24,249.

Its name Zhangshanying (Chinese: 张山营; lit. 'Zhang Mountain Barrack') originated in 1644, when Li Zicheng stationed his troops in Zhang Mountain after he entered Beijing.

Inside the area of the town is the Guyaju Caves and the nearby village of Dongmenying; also within the area of the town is the West Dazhuangke village, the host settlement of the Yanqing cluster of 2022 Winter Olympics.

== Geography ==
Zhangshanying Town is on the south of Yan Mountain Range, and the Mount Haituo on its northern border with Hebei is the 2nd tallest mountain in Beijing, with a peak elevation of 2,241 meters.

Datong–Qinhuangdao railway, National Highway 110 and Kangzhuang-Zhangjiakou Highway all pass through the town.

== History ==
Timeline of Zhangshanying Town
Year	Status	Part of
1948 - 1952	7th District	Yanqing County, Chahar
1952 - 1956	7th District	Yanqing County, Hebei
1956 - 1958	Xizhuojiaying Township Xiaohetun Township Zhangshanying Township Yaojiaying Township	Yanqing County, Hebei
1958 - 1961	Dengta People's Commune	Yanqing County, Beijing
1961 - 1963	Wuliying People's Commune Zhangshanying People's Commune	Yanqing County, Beijing
1963 - 1983	Zhangshanying People's Commune	Yanqing County, Beijing
1983 - 1990	Zhangshanying Township	Yanqing County, Beijing
1990 - 2015	Zhangshanying Town (Merged with Jinjiapu Township in 2000)	Yanqing County, Beijing
2015–present	Zhangshanying Town (Merged with Jinjiapu Township in 2000)	Yanqing District, Beijing

== Administrative divisions ==
As of the year 2021, Zhangshanying Town consisted of 34 subdivisions, including these 2 communities and 32 villages:

Subdivision names	Name transliterations	Type
张山营镇	Zhangshanying Zhen	Community
龙聚山庄	Longju Shanzhuang	Community
大庄科	Dazhuangke	Village
佛峪口	Foyukou	Village
水峪	Shuiyu	Village
胡家营	Hujiaying	Village
姚家营	Yaojiaying	Village
东门营	Dongmenying	Village
下营	Xiaying	Village
西五里营	Xi Wuliying	Village
前黑龙庙	Qian Heilongmiao	Village
后黑龙庙	Hou Heilongmiao	Village
西卓家营	Xi Zhuojiaying	Village
下芦凤营	Xia Lufengying	Village
上芦凤营	Shang Lufengying	Village
张山营	Zhangshanying	Village
马庄	Mazhuang	Village
小河屯	Xiaohetun	Village
上板泉	Shang Banquan	Village
下板泉	Xia Banquan	Village
玉皇庙	Yuhuangmiao	Village
西羊坊	Xiyangfang	Village
辛家堡	Xinjiapu	Village
丁家堡	Dingjiapu	Village
靳家堡	Jinjiapu	Village
田宋营	Tiansongying	Village
吴庄	Wuzhuang	Village
龙聚山庄	Longju Shanzhuang	Village
晏家堡	Yanjiapu	Village
中羊坊	Zhongyangfang	Village
黄柏寺	Huangbaisi	Village
上郝庄	Shanghaozhuang	Village
韩郝庄	Hanhaozhuang	Village
苏庄	Suzhuang	Village

== Landmarks ==
- Guyaju Caves
- Songshan National Nature Reserve

== Gallery ==
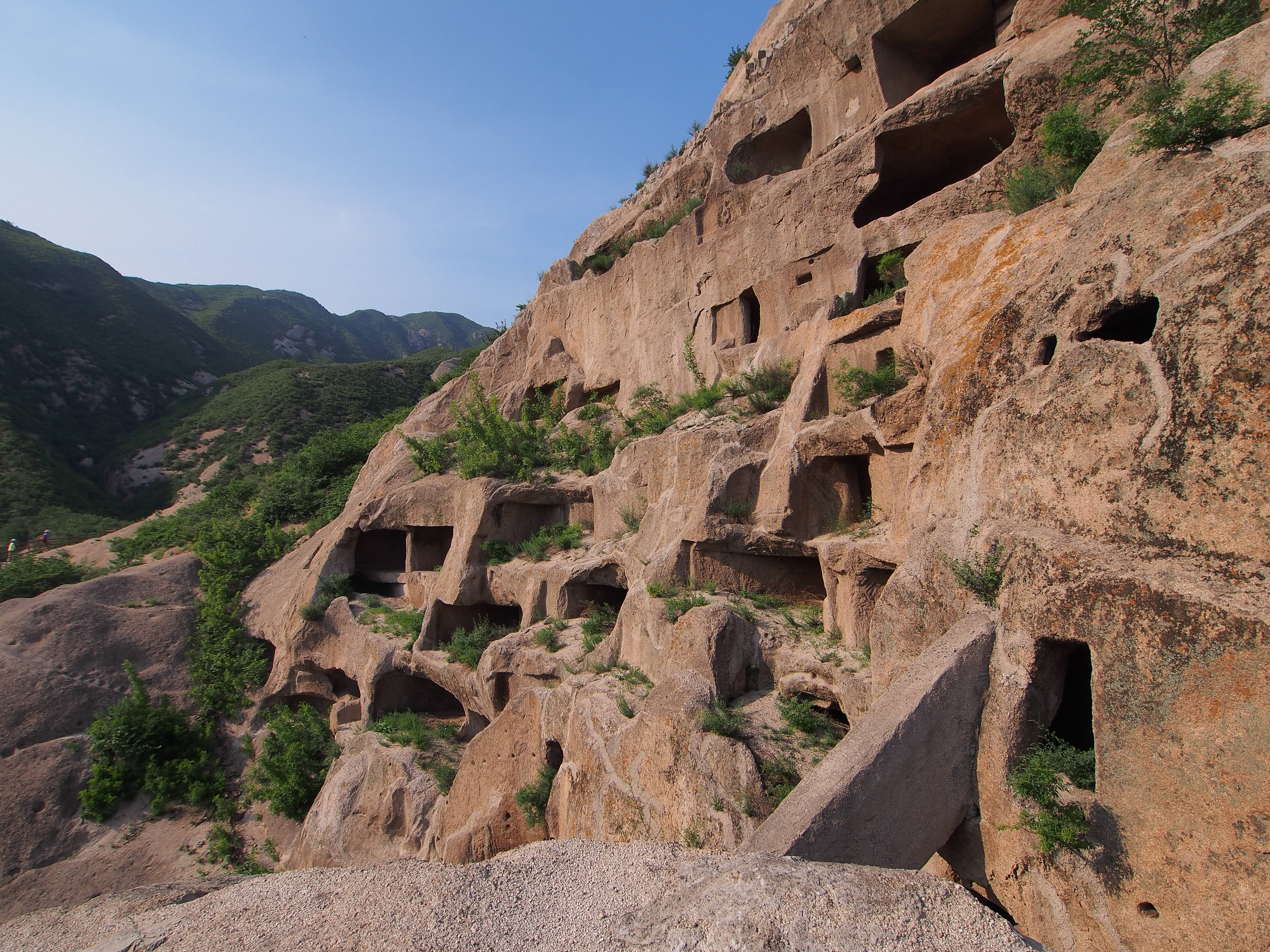
Cliff dwellings in Guyuju, 2013

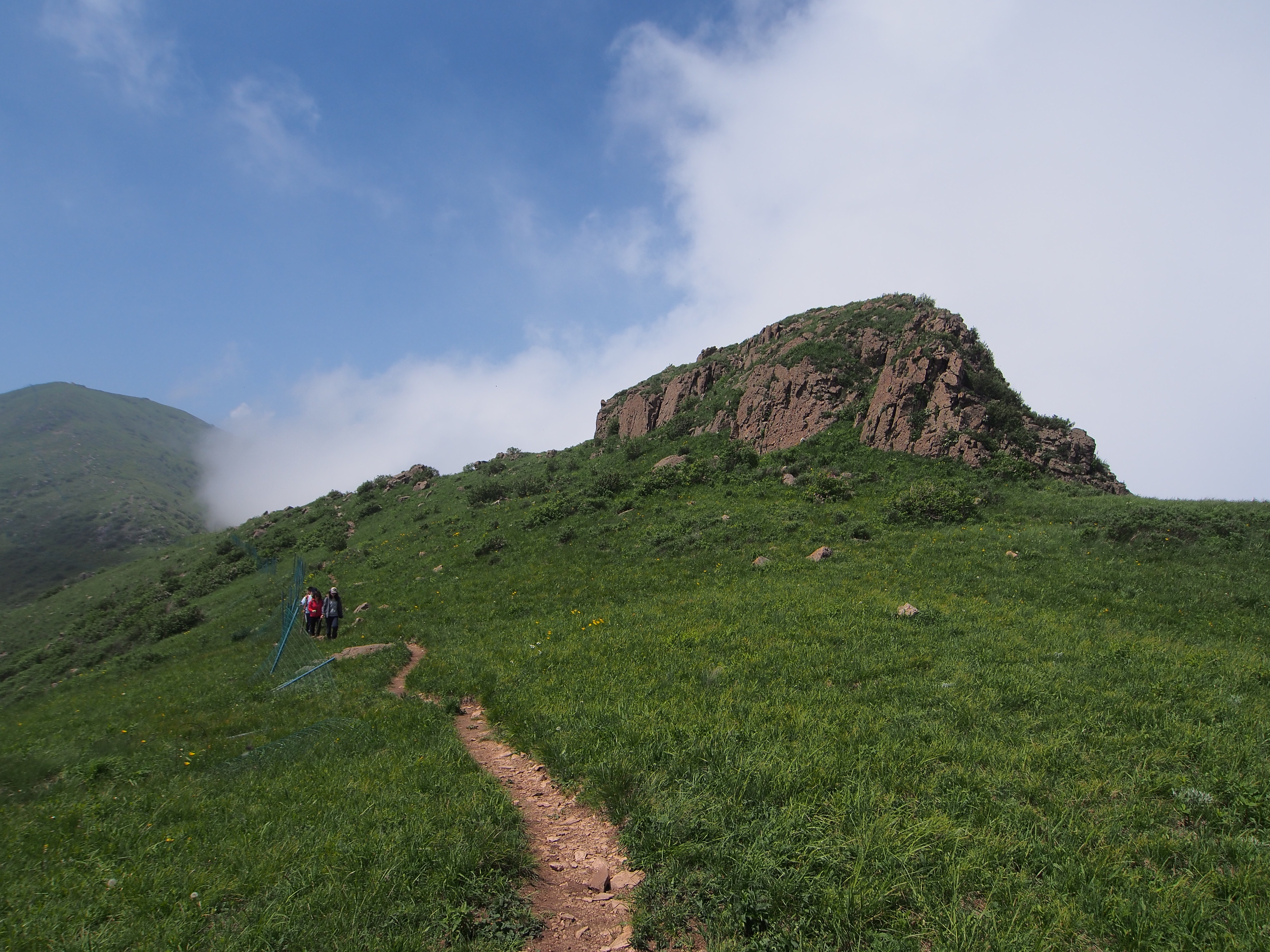
Mount Song, 2013

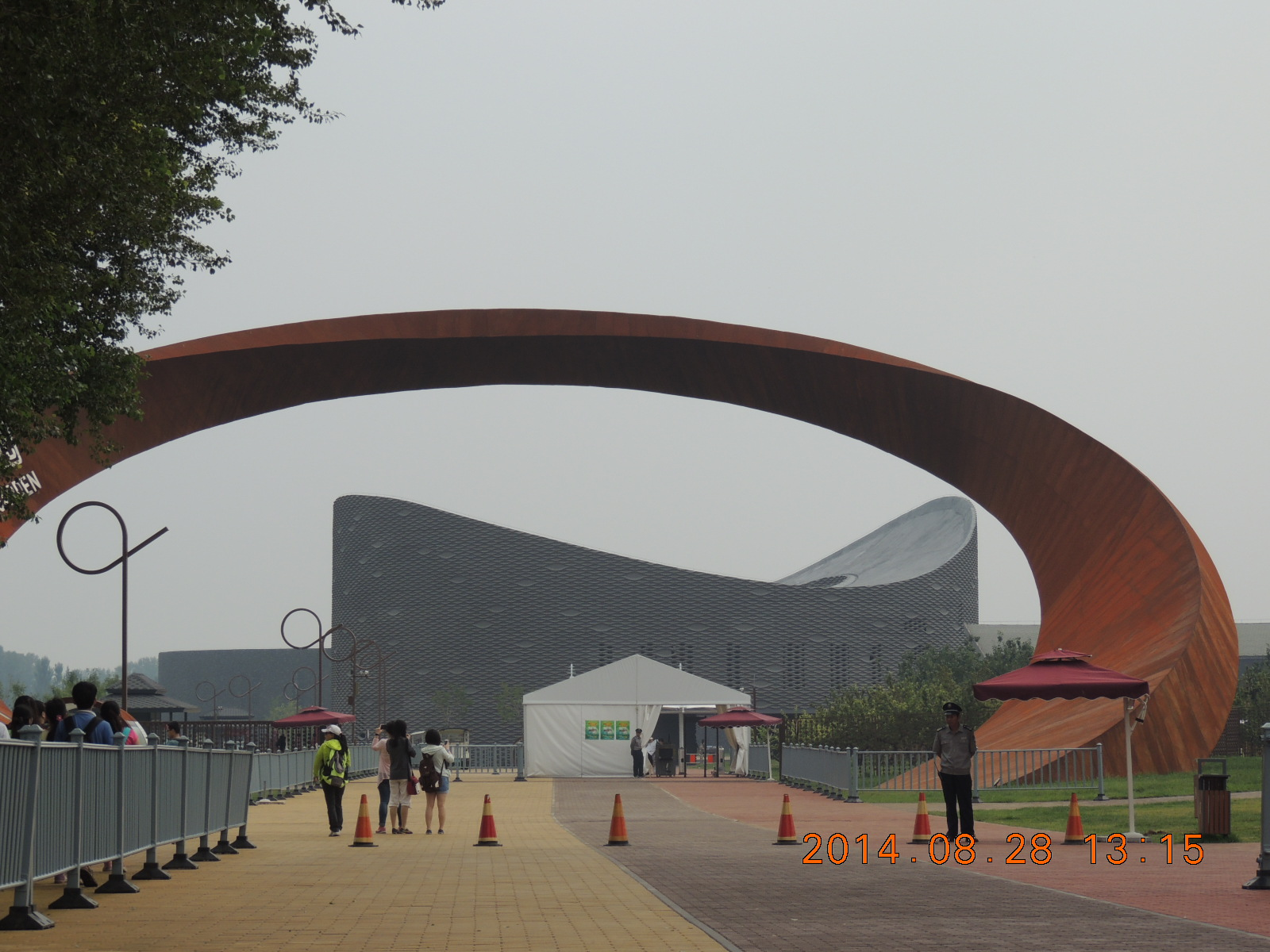
World Grape Expo, 2014

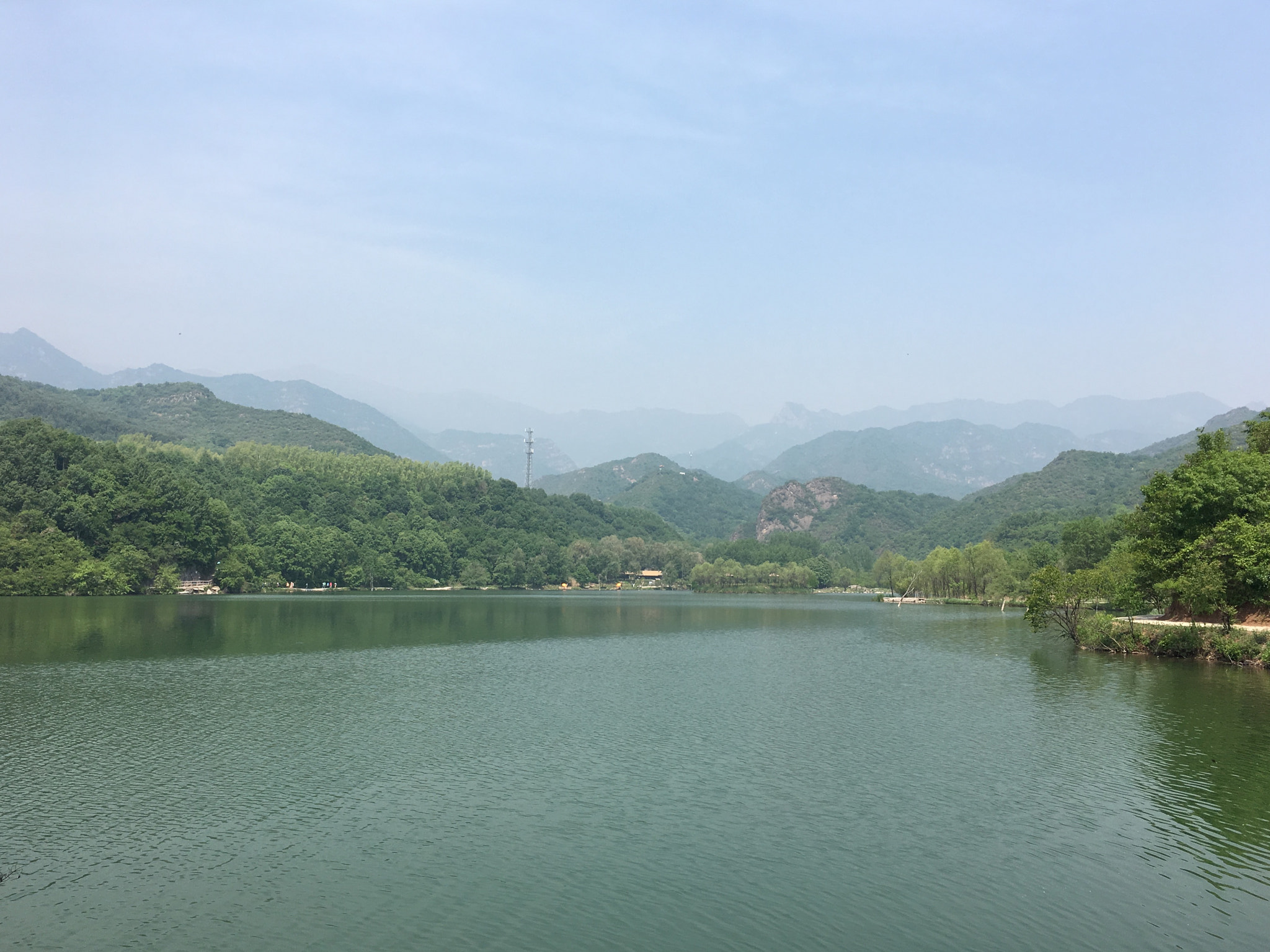
Yudu Mountain, 2017

== See also ==
- List of township-level divisions of Beijing
