= Dongmen =

Dōngmén (simplified Chinese: 东门; traditional Chinese: 東門) may refer to:

- Dongmen (surname), a Chinese compound surname

== Locations in China ==
- Dongmen, Shenzhen, in Luohu District, Shenzhen, Guangdong
- Dongmen, Fusui County, a town in Guangxi
- Dongmen, Luocheng County, a town in Luocheng Mulao Autonomous County, Guangxi
- Dongmen, Wenquan, a village in Yingshan County, Hubei
- Dongmen, Xinghua, a former village in Xinghua Township, Hong'an County, Hubei
- Dongmen Subdistrict, Guixi, in Guixi, Jianxi
- Dongmen Township, Dao County, Hunan
- Hughes Reef, Sansha, Hainan, also known as Dongmen Reef
- Dongmenying, a village in Yanqing District, Beijing.

== Others ==
- Dongmen Road, in Shanghai
- Dongmenkou station, in Ningbo
- Dongmen Bridge station, in Chengdu
- Dongmen metro station, in Taipei
  - East Gate of Taipei City Wall
- Dongmen station (Shenzhen Metro), in Shenzhen
- Heunginjimun, also known as Dongdaemun, in Seoul

== See also ==
- Dongmen Subdistrict (disambiguation)
- East Gate (disambiguation)
