= Railway Department of the Office of the Governor-General of Taiwan =

National historical site in Taiwan

Coordinates: 25.0488°N 121.5112°E

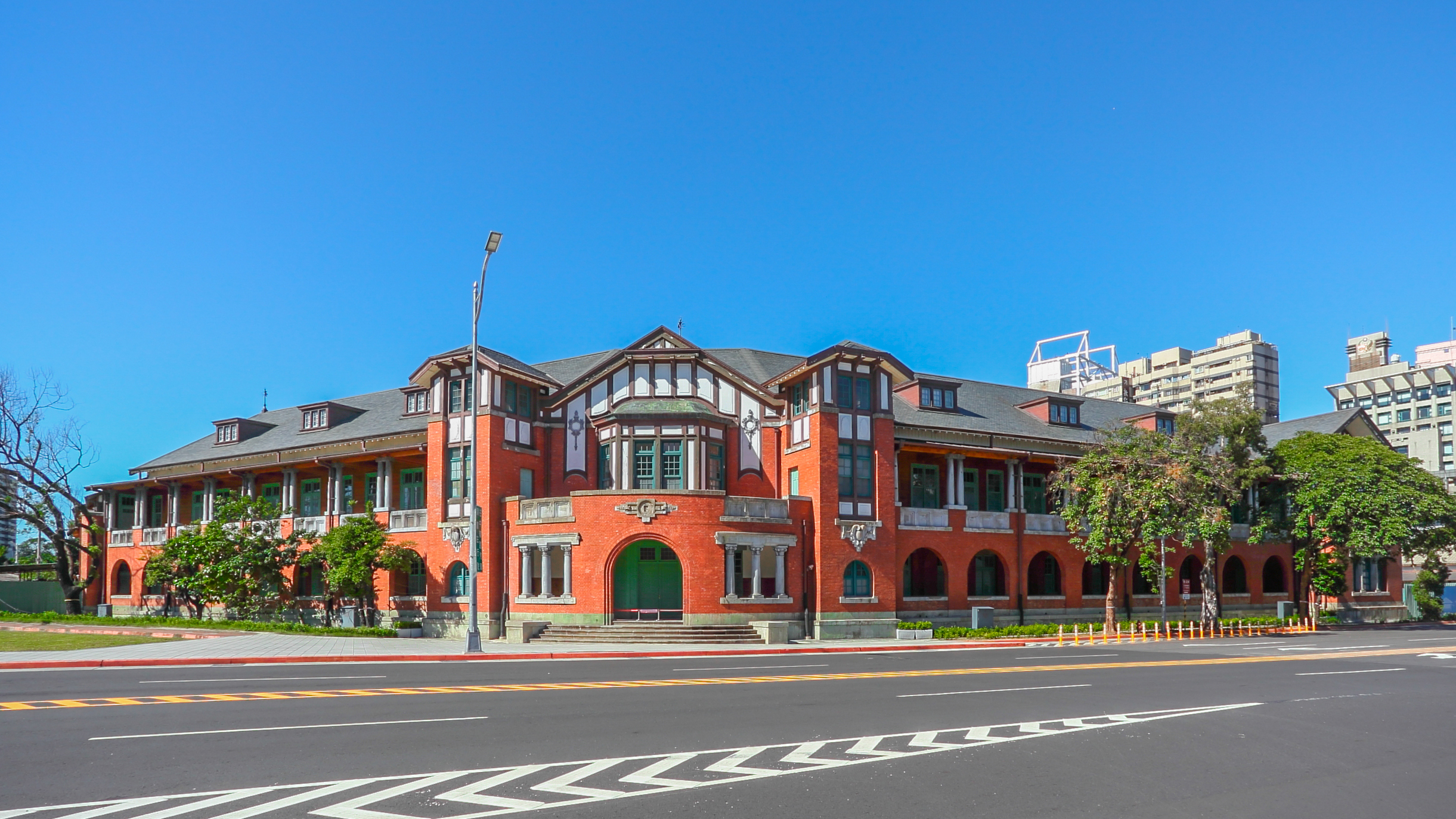
Headquarters building of the Railway Department

Railway Department of the Office of the Governor-General of Taiwan

Meeting room on the second floor

The Railway Department of the Office of the Governor-General of Taiwan (Chinese: 台灣總督府交通局鐵道部) is a National Historic Site in Taiwan. The site, near the Taipei North Gate, was in use for railway administration during the late Qing dynasty, but the current extant building is a Japanese colonial administrative building in Taipei dating from 1919, used until 1945 as the headquarters of the Taihoku Railway Bureau and the Railway Department of the Office of the Governor-General of Taiwan's Bureau of Transportation, and then from 1948 until 1990 as the headquarters of Taiwan Railways Administration. It was granted national monument status in 2007, and is a part of the National Taiwan Museum.

The Old Taipei Railway Workshop is also part of the historic site. It is located northwest from the headquarters building of the Railway Department of the Office of the Governor-General of Taiwan.

On January 9, 2014, the National Taiwan Museum began repair work on the buildings. In 2016, the project was initially completed and on July 7, 2020, it officially opened to the public.
