= Beimen =

Beimen (Chinese: 北門; lit. 'North Gate') may refer to the following:

- Beimen District, a district in Taiwan
- Beimen railway station, a station on the TRA West Coast Line
- Beimen metro station, a station in the Taipei MRT
- Taipei North Gate, a historical monument
