= Taipei Post Office =

Post office in Zhongzheng, Taipei, Taiwan

- 臺北郵局
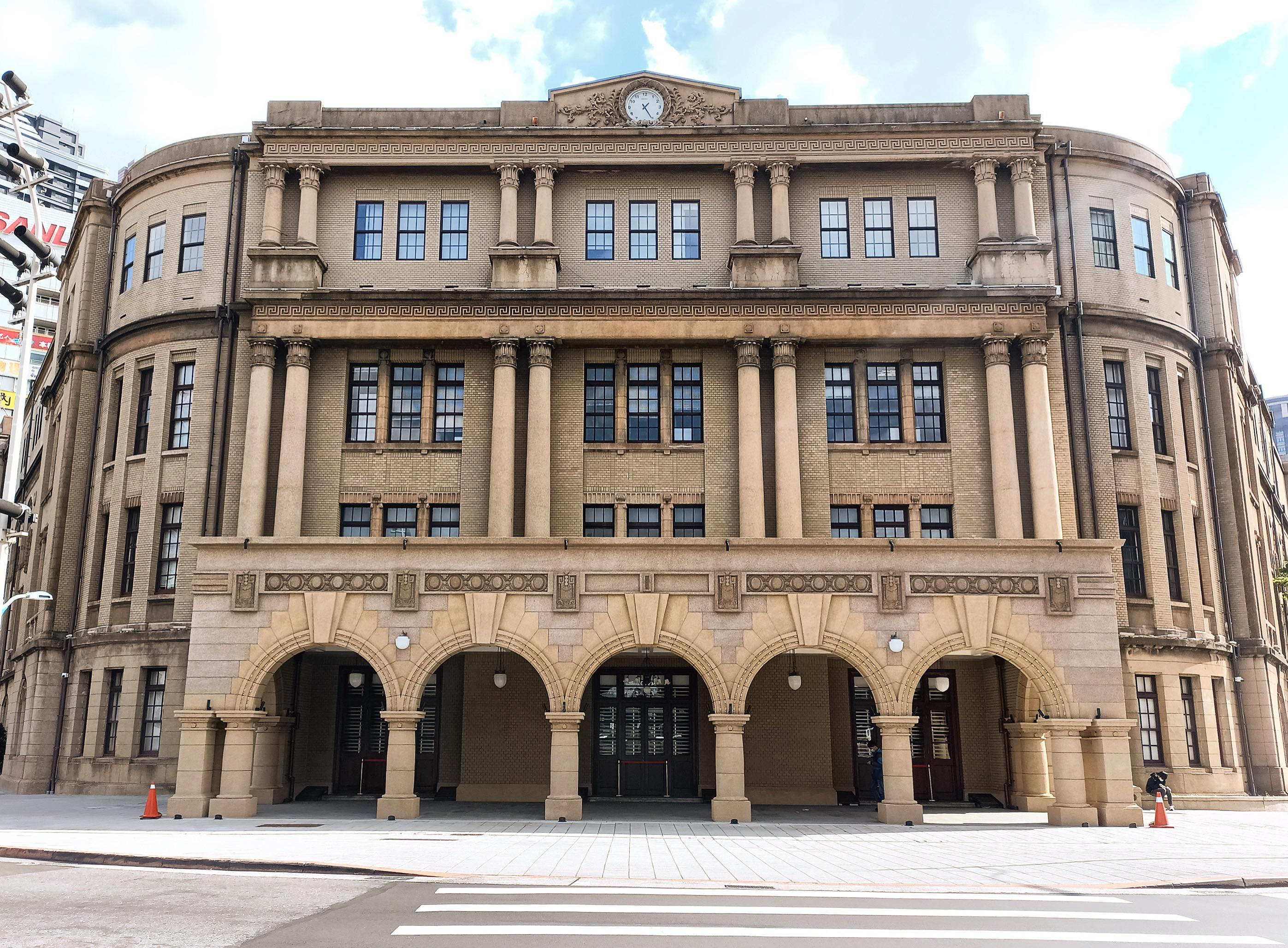
- Interactive map of the Taipei Post Office area

General information
- Type: Post office
- Location: Zhongzheng, Taipei, Taiwan
- Coordinates: 25°02′50″N 121°30′42″E
- Groundbreaking: April 1928
- Completed: April 1930

Technical details
- Floor count: 4
- Floor area: 8,000 m^{2}

Design and construction
- Architect: Shunichi Kuriyama

Taipei Post Office (Chinese: 臺北郵局; pinyin: Táiběi Yóujú; Minnan: Tâi-pak Iû-kiȯk) or Taipei Beimen Post Office (Chinese: 臺北北門郵局; pinyin: Táiběi Běimén Yóujú; Minnan: Tâi-pak Pak-bûn Iû-kiȯk) is a four-story building located close to Beimen (lit. "North Gate") in Zhongzheng District, Taipei, Taiwan. The building is listed a historic site. It is the main post office of Chunghwa Post in Taipei, supervising all the postal businesses of the 143 branch offices in Taipei City.

== History ==
=== Empire of Japan ===
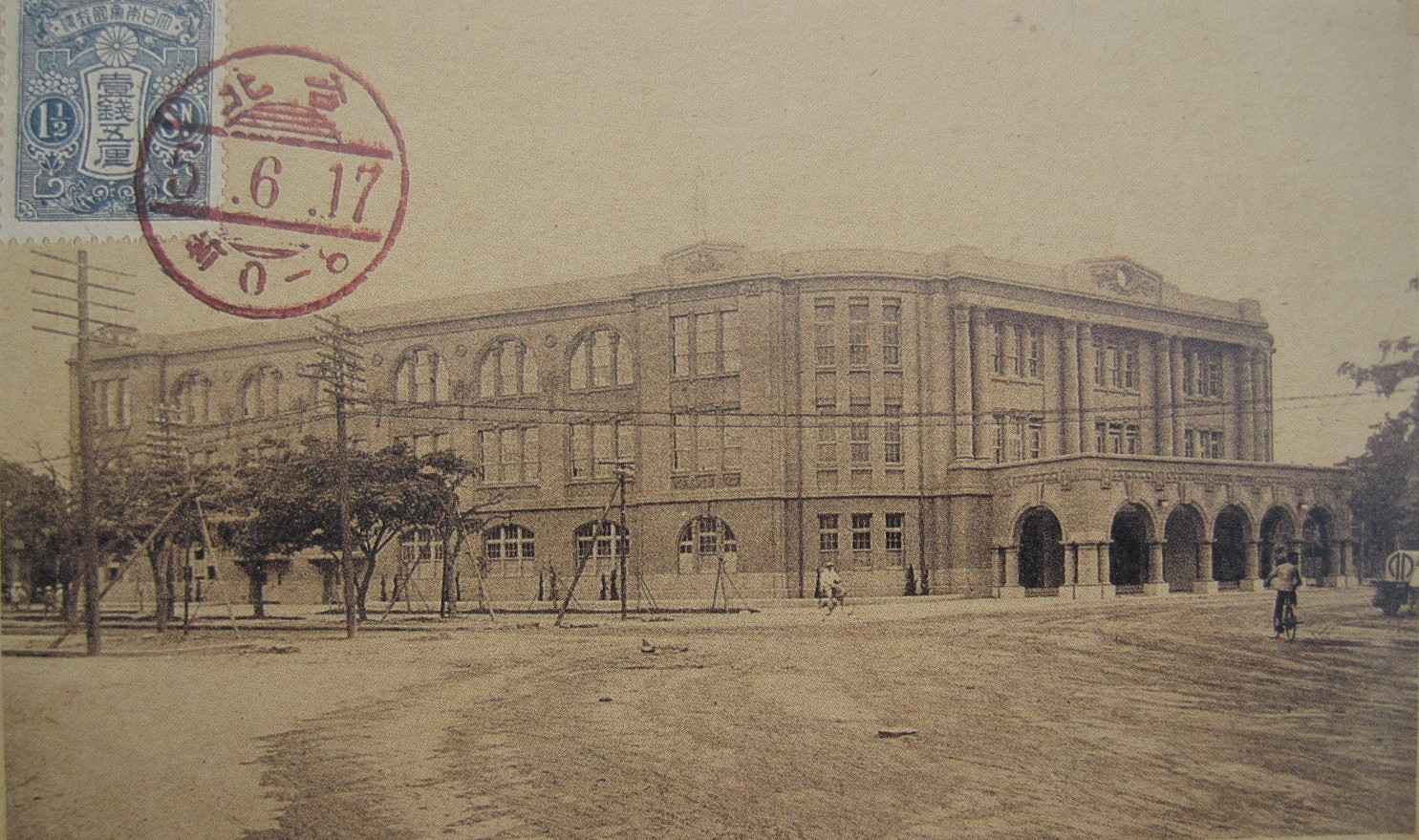
Taipei Post Office in 1930

March 1895 marked the end of the First Sino-Japanese War when the Japanese troops from Hiroshima came to conquest their land on the Pescadores. After they have claimed ownership on all the Pescadores’ islands, the Japanese set up their Military Post Office there, which became the first post office in Taiwan established by the Japanese.

After the Japanese invasion of Taiwan in 1895, Taiwan entered the Japanese Colonial Period. From 1895 to 1900, the Japanese established 23 post offices around the island. Among these post offices are the three headquarters in Taipei, Taichung, and Kaohsiung. These post offices were mainly for military mailing services and were under the telecommunication sector.

The Taipei Post Office that became one of the three main mailing administrative headquarters during the Japanese Colonial Period was built near the Beimen location of today’s building. The construction began in 1889 and ended in 1892. The origin was a one-storey wooden building but was burnt in a fire in 1913 along with the Telecom Bureau of Governor-General of Taiwan. A temporary office was built in the same year, but again it was a wooden structure.

At the end of 1920, the temporary post office was under the demand, therefore the Governor-General decided to reconstruct Taipei Post Office on the same spot. Construction officials then decided to build the new headquarters with steel and cement structure, also proposed to build the biggest and largest post office operation center in Taiwan at that time.

In April 1928, with the blueprint of Shunichi Kuriyama (栗山俊一), a designer from the Construction and Maintenance Section of Governor-General Office, the rebuilt of Taipei Post Office had its groundbreaking. The construction finished in April 1930.

=== Republic of China ===
After the handover of Taiwan from Japan to the Republic of China in 1945, the post office tore down its northern wing arch passages, due to the increasing flow of postal service in the 1960s. Moreover, another floor was added to the original three-story building. Although it remained the original colour and pillar-styled design, it was thought to be destruction to the origin.

Because of the dilapidated state of the Taipei Post Office building, postal service officials wished to demolish the whole building ever since 1970. However, the site is historically valued, and therefore the tearing down plan has always been protested and objected by scholars and people. To settle the debate, the government ordered this post office building to be protected as a third-degree national historic site on 14 August 1992. After 2000, postal service unit switched its usual position and started to furnish the site and to sustain the image as original as possible. But since the tile factory in Beitou has stopped producing the wall tiles, the ex-foliation of the outside wall is still a major problem that needs to be solved.

== Architecture ==
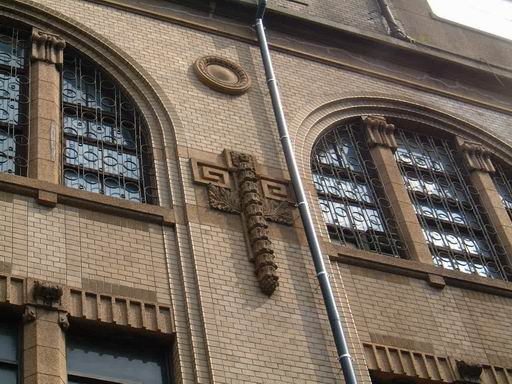
The Baroque architectural details of the building

The building was constructed with two huge wings and one front opening, with a large open ground immediately behind the main building. The total ground floor is about 8,000 square meters.

The shape of Taipei Post Office in its 1930s design was like a trapezoid with three storeys and two wings. The structural design of the building was identical to the traditional Taiwanese-style residential house—the “Siheyuan.”

The main entrance of the post office faces northwest; this hall stretches 80 m wide with the entrance hallway protruding from the building, shaped like an arch. The front of the building has four pairs of classical double pillars, which together embrace two large and one small window frames. As for the outside wall, besides using small pebbles, it also used the light-brown “bombproof coloured” small tiles from the tile factory in Beitou, which was practical during wartime. The Japanese standards for installing wall tiles piece by piece were called “teikake” (丁掛け.)

The inside is a three-storey building. The grand hall stands two-storeys high and takes up a quarter of the whole indoor area. Huge columns at either end hold up the third floor. Influenced by the modern eclecticism, the indoor furnish was rather simple. However, we could still find its delicacy from the columns and the grand hall ceiling.

Due to the age of the building, tiles on the outside wall often fall off; pedestrians need to be careful when passing by the building.
