= Taipei Railway Workshop =

- 臺北機廠
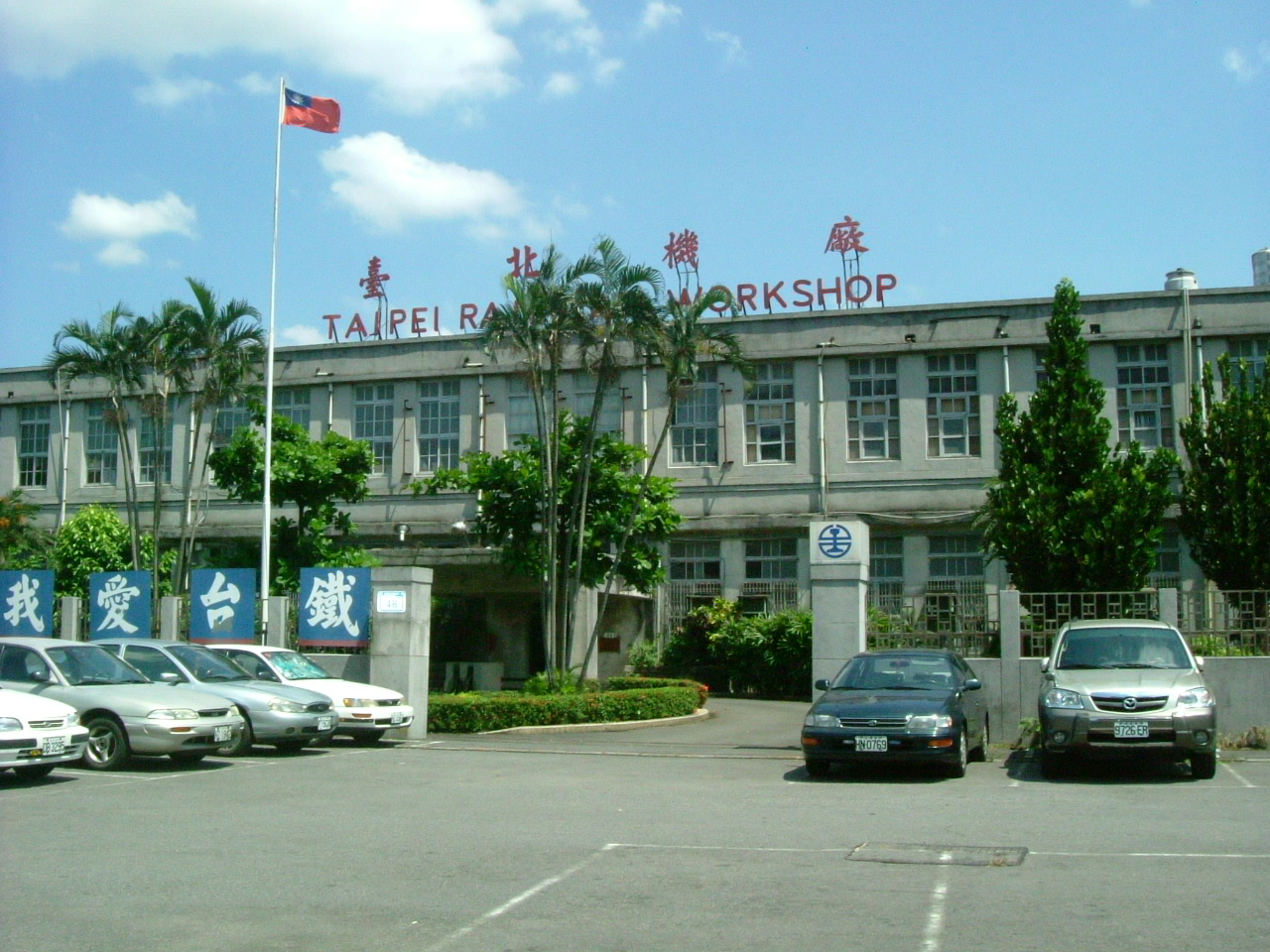
- Interactive map of the Taipei Railway Workshop area
- Former names: Train Hospital

General information
- Type: Former workshop
- Location: Xinyi, Taipei, Taiwan
- Coordinates: 25.0461°N 121.5634°E
- Completed: 30 October 1935

Technical details
- Grounds: 16.82 hectares

The Taipei Railway Workshop (Chinese: 臺北機廠) was the largest railway workshop of the Taiwan Railways Administration. For decades it manufactured and maintained thousands of railway vehicles. The workshop was established in 1935 to replace the original workshop, the Old Taipei Railway Workshop, which had become inadequate. It was the largest railway workshop ever built in Taiwan. The Governor-General of Taiwan recognized its establishment as a celebration of the Empire of Japan's rule of Taiwan for 40 years.

The 16.82-hectare site on Civic Boulevard was the largest and oldest kind on the island. It closed in 2012. It was constructed in 1930 and featured distinctive structures such as a 168-meter-long train assembly shed. The operation was transferred to TRA Fugang Vehicle Depot (Chinese: 臺鐵富岡基地). The workshop was recognized as an "official national historic site" in 2015. The government of Taiwan says it is planning to transform the facility into a railway museum, the National Railway Museum, Taiwan.

== In popular culture ==
The Taipei Railway Workshop was featured in the 2013 Jay Chou film The Rooftop and in the 2014 Luc Besson film Lucy.

== Gallery ==
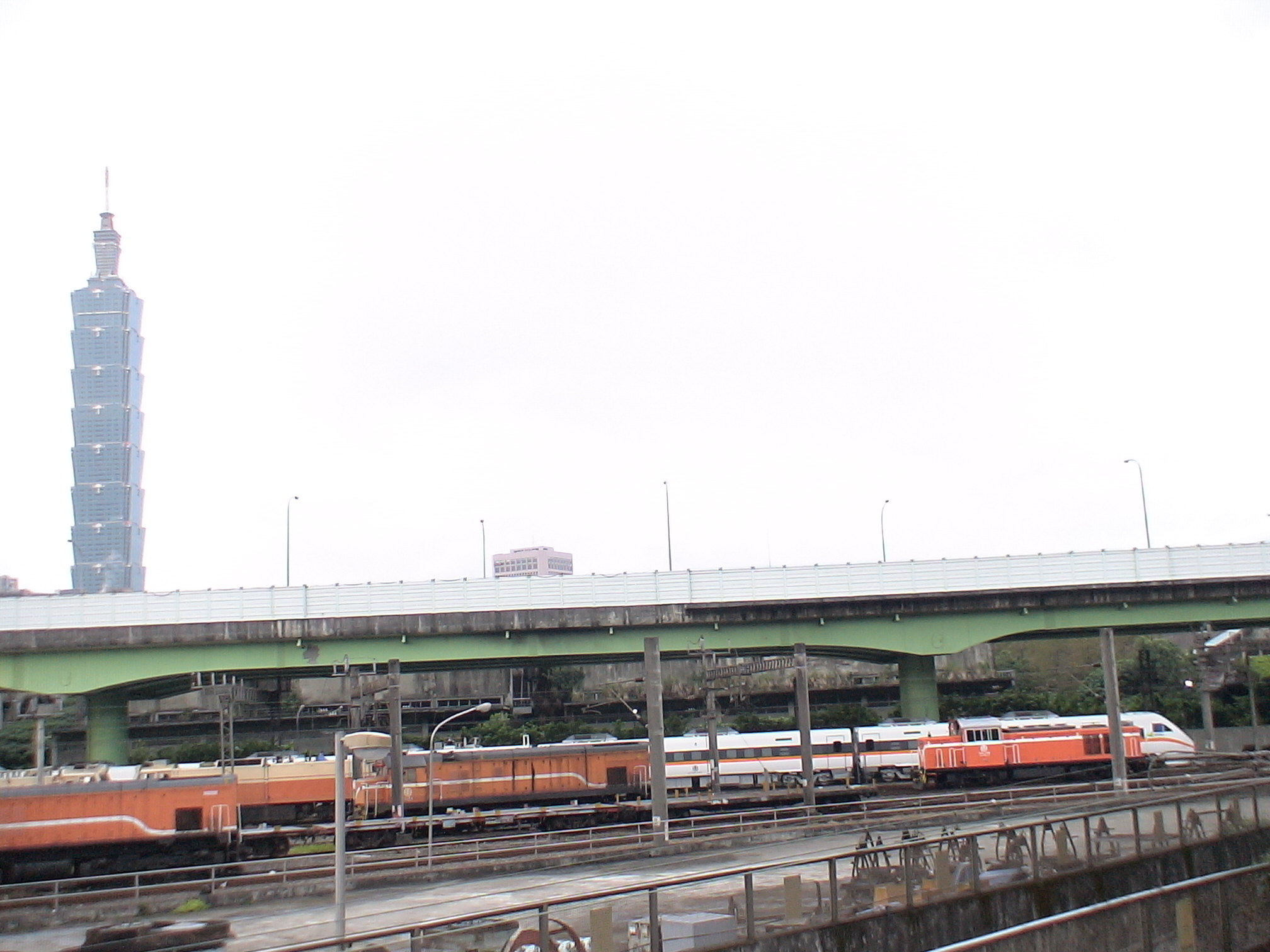
Side view of Workshop access tracks and rolling stock in December 2006.

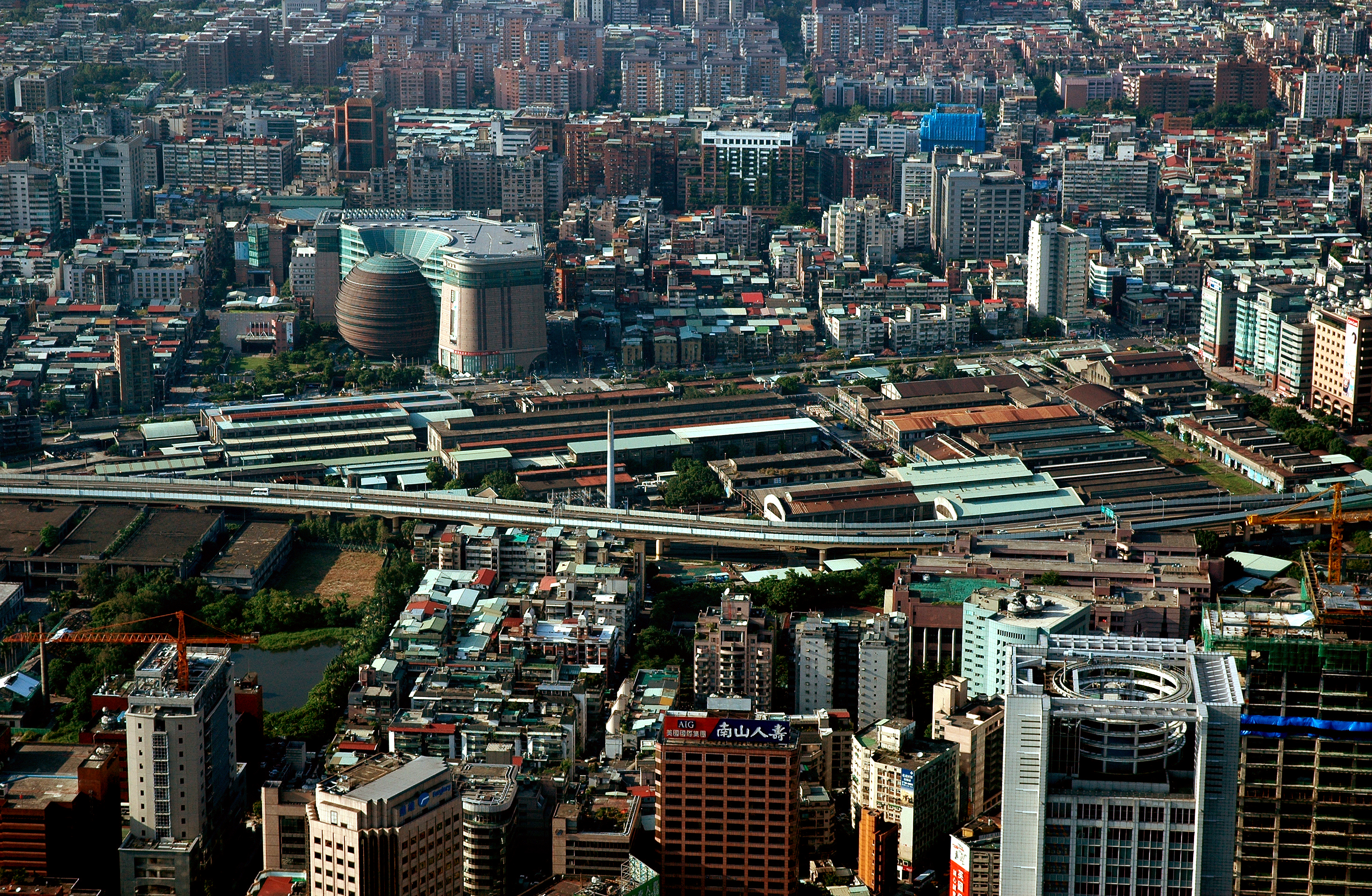
View of the Workshop from Taipei 101.

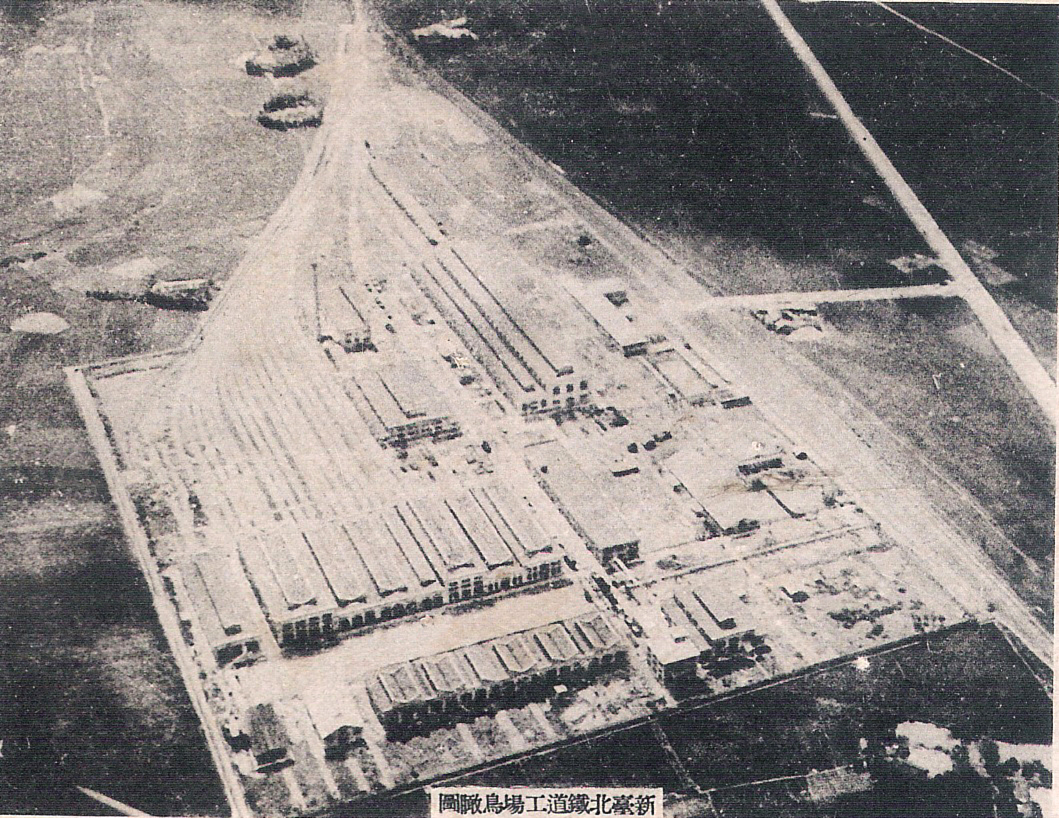
View of the Workshop in 1935.

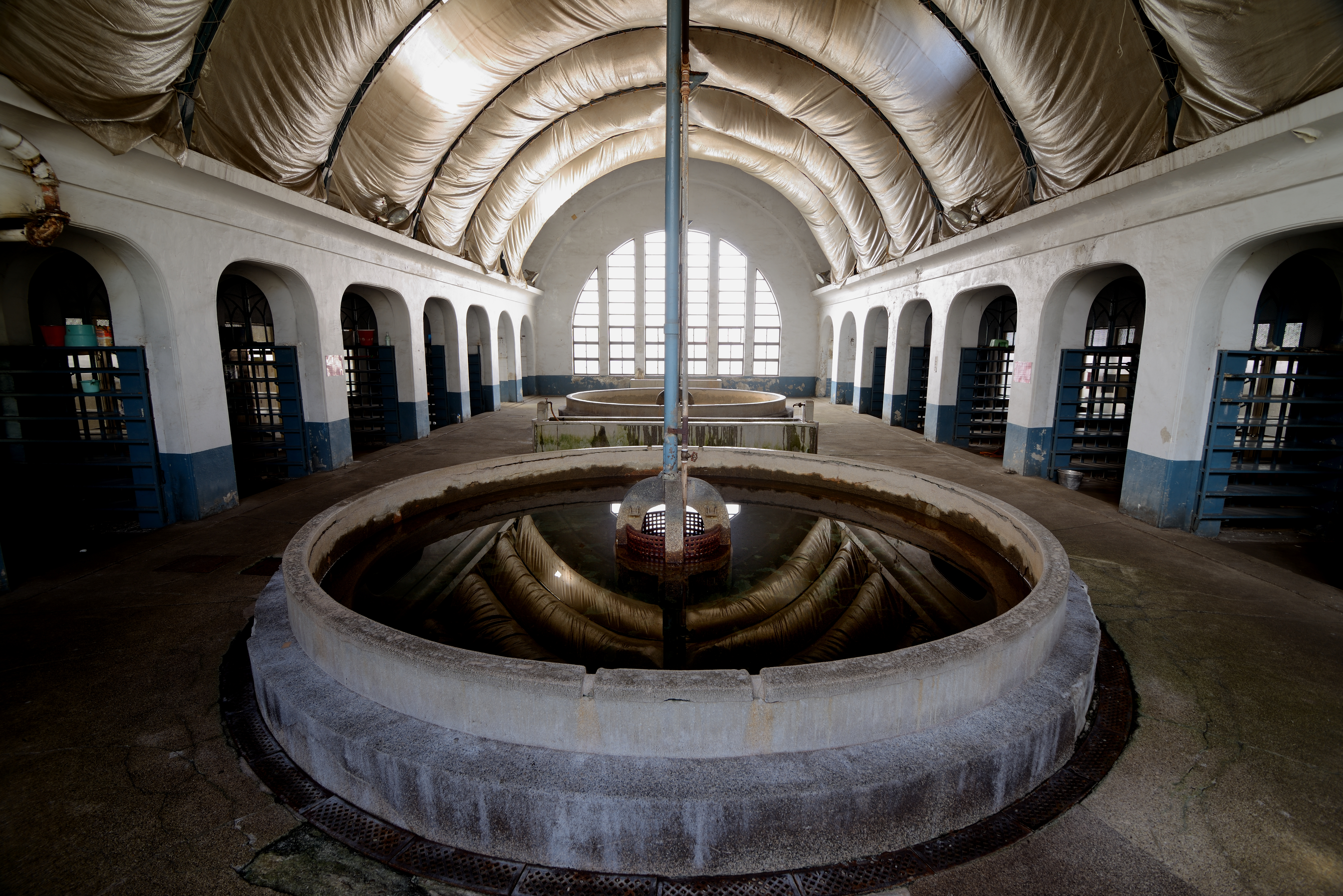
Bathhouse of the Workshop.

Exterior facade of the employee bathhouse

Employee bathhouse

Communal washing trough

The employee bathhouse with an installation by artist Liao Chien-Chung

== Transportation ==
The Taipei Railway Workshop is accessible within walking distance northeast from Sun Yat-sen Memorial Hall Station or south from Nanjing Sanmin Station of the Taipei Metro.
