= Dongmen Subdistrict =

Dongmen Subdistrict may refer to:

- Dongmen Subdistrict, Chuzhou, in Langya District, Chuzhou, Anhui
- Dongmen Subdistrict, Anhui, in Jinghu District, Wuhu, Anhui
- Dongmen Subdistrict, Wuhu, in Jinghu District, Wuhu, Anhui
- Dongmen Subdistrict, Shenzhen, in Luohu District, Shenzhen, Guangdong
- Dongmen Subdistrict, Guixi, in Guixi, Jiangxi
- Dongmen Subdistrict, Ürümqi, in Tianshan District, Ürümqi, Xinjiang

== See also ==
- Dongmen (disambiguation)
