= Dongmenkou station =

Ningbo Metro station

Coordinates: 29.8739°N 121.5519°E

Dongmenkou (Tianyi Square) 东门口（天一广场）
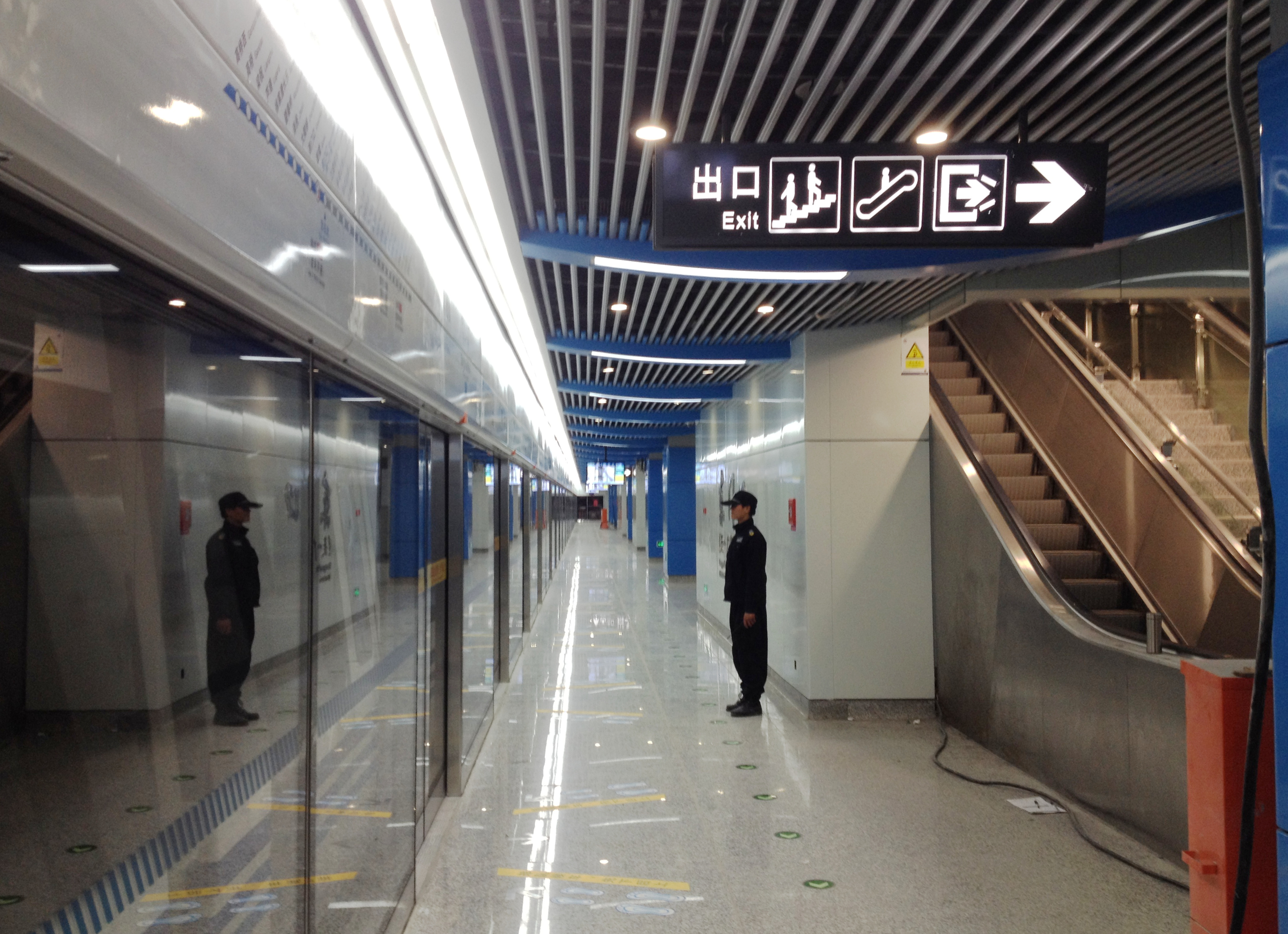

General information
- Location: Haishu District, Ningbo, Zhejiang; China
- Operator: Ningbo Rail Transit Co. Ltd.
- Line: Line 1
- Platforms: 2 (1 island platform)

Construction
- Structure type: Underground

History
- Opened: 30 May 2014
- Former names: Tianyi Square

Services
Preceding station	Ningbo Rail Transit	Following station
Gulou towards Gaoqiao West	Line 1	Jiangxia Bridge East towards Xiapu
Location

Dongmenkou Station, or Dongmenkou (Tianyi Square) Station (simplified Chinese: 东门口（天一广场）站; traditional Chinese: 東門口（天一廣場）站; pinyin: Dōngménkǒu (Tiānyī Guǎngchǎng) Zhàn), or literally East Gate Station, is a metro station on Line 1 of the Ningbo Rail Transit that started operations on 30 May 2014. It is situated under Zhongshan East Road (Chinese: 中山东路) in Haishu District of Ningbo City, Zhejiang Province, eastern China.

== Exits ==
Exit number	Exit location
Exit A	Zhongshan East Road Rixin Street
Exit C	Zhongshan East Road Tianyi Square
Exit 1	Zhongshan East Road Xinhualian Mall

== Connections ==
=== Ningbo Bus Network ===
- Dongmenkou Bus Stop (Westbound): 2, 2-Night, 15, 19, 360, 503, 506, 515, 517, 518, 821, 852 (All-Night), 871 (Night), 891 (Night)
- Dongmenkou Bus Stop (Eastbound): 2, 2-Night, 4, 10, 15, 19, 350, 360, 503, 506, 515, 517, 518, 821, 855 (Night), 871 (Night), 891 (Night)
- Heyi Avenue Bus Stop: Routes 28, 60, 331, 350

== Station layout ==
G	Street level	Exit/entrance
M	Mezzanine	Access to D·G Line Shopping Street
B1	Concourse	Ticketing, station service center, Ningbo Citizen Card service center, faregates
B2; Line 1 platform	Westbound	← toward Xiapu
B2; Line 1 platform	Island platform, doors will open on the left
B2; Line 1 platform	Eastbound	toward Lishe International Airport →

== Notable places nearby ==
Tianyi Square, Xinhualian Mall, Heyi Avenue Shopping Center, Ningbo Movie City, Qianye Hall, Jiangxia Park.
