= Xiaonanmen station =

Xiaonanmen station may refer to:

- Xiaonanmen station (Shanghai Metro), a station on the Shanghai Metro in China
- Xiaonanmen MRT station, a station on the Taipei Metro in Taiwan
