= Dongmenying =

Dongmenying 东门营
- Village
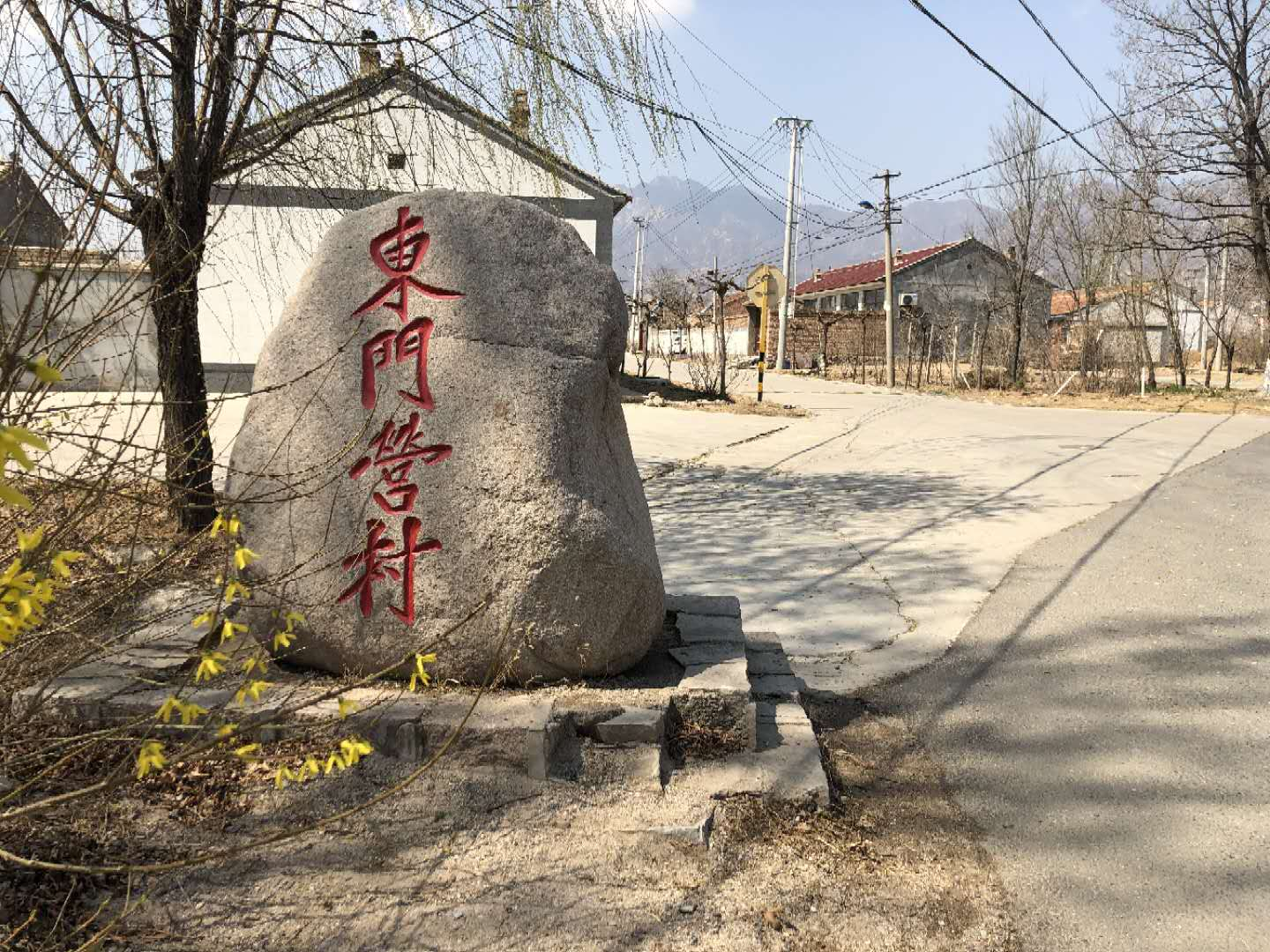
- Village entrance
- Country: People's Republic of China
- Municipality: Beijing
- District: Yanqing
- Town: Zhangshanying

Population
  - Total: 970

Dongmenying (Chinese: 东门营) is a village of 970 people in Yanqing District, Beijing, China. In 2018, the village was named among the 44 villages of Beijing designated as traditional and to be protected.

== Tourism ==
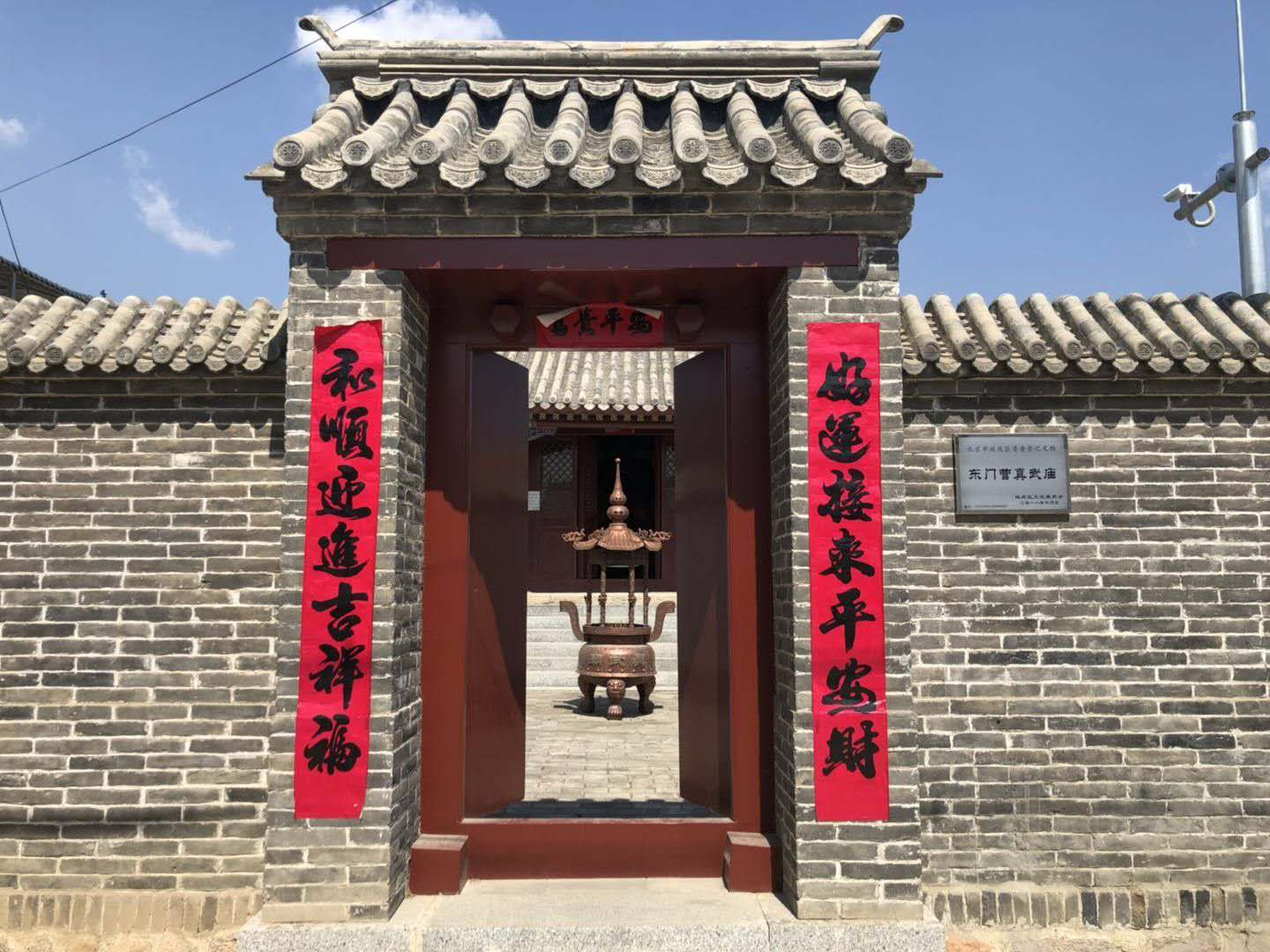
Zhenwu Temple

The village is the nearest village to the Guyaju Caves, the ruins of caves that are believed to have been built by a nomadic band of the Kumo Xi during the Liao Dynasty. The Zhenwu Temple is one of several old temples still standing in the village.

== Transportation ==
County Road 010 runs through the village and onwards to the Guyaju Caves. The village is near the Dongmenying Intersection where County Road 010 crosses China National Highway 110. The Dongmenying Intersection is a stop on the route of public bus Y01.
