= Guyaju Caves =

Caves in Yanqing, Beijing, China

Coordinates: 40°27′56″N 115°46′8″E

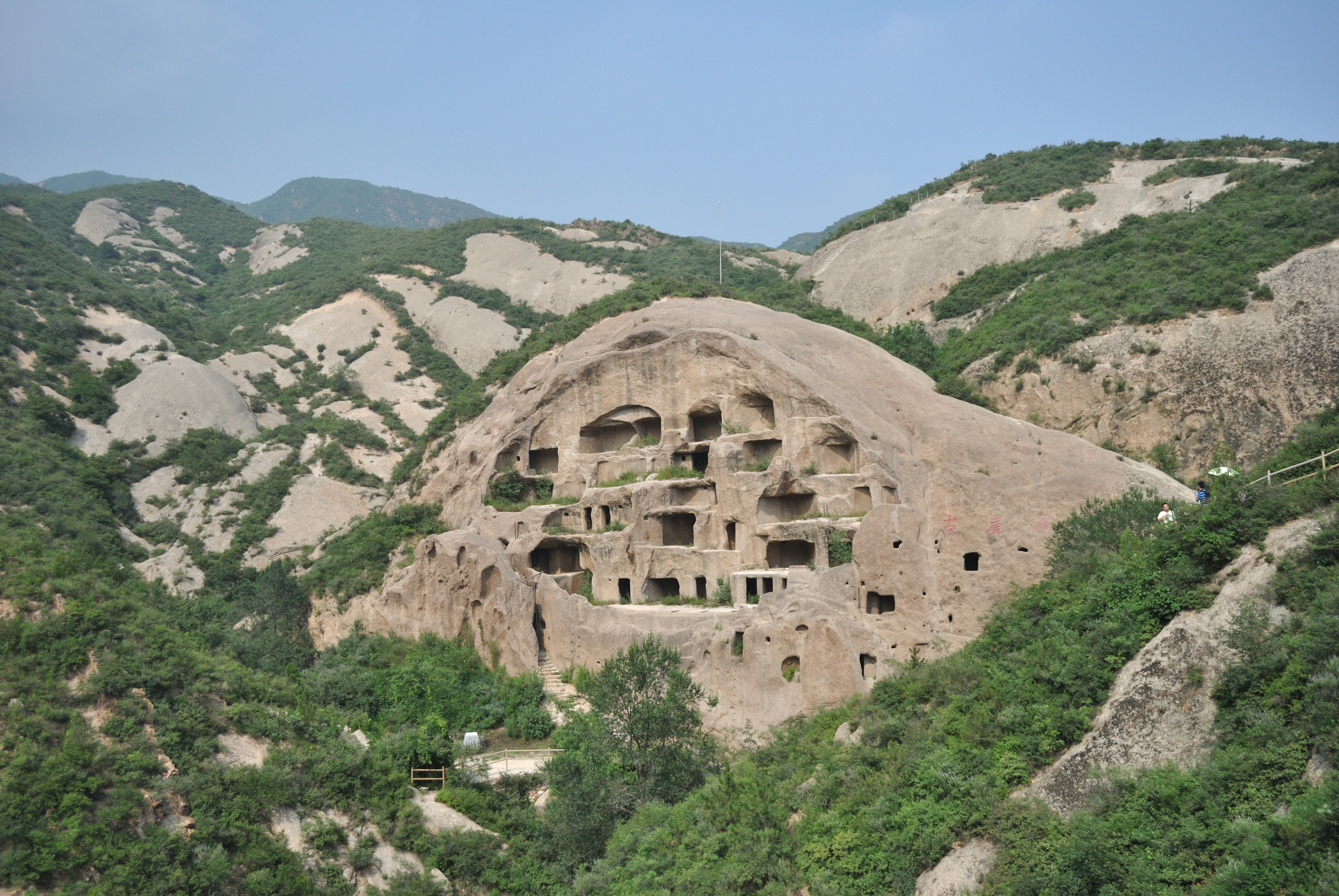
Main group of cliff homes

Guyaju Caves (古崖居) are the ruins of a cave complex that may have served as dwellings for a fortified community situated in a valley near present-day Dongmenying, Yanqing District, Beijing, China.

The origins of the community are mysterious due to uncertainty about the founding people and later disappearance of the community. The settlement may have been established by a tribe of people belonging to the Kumo Xi during the Liao dynasty. Other theories are the complex was built by outlaws on the run or served as a military garrison during the Tang dynasty. However, there are no clear answers as to the history of the caves with the historical literature stressing "its origins are a continuing archeological cipher."

The dwellings and worship hall are hewn from the rock face of cliffs. The cave rooms are packed close to each other and in some places are cut at different levels of the same cliff face, giving the appearance of a multistory building. There are 350 chambers inside of the complex's 117 caves. A Chieftain's Palace is located at the bottom of one of the rock faces of the complex. This more elaborate residence has 8 rooms and is supported by columns cut from the rock.

== History ==
The ancient cliff dwellings of Yanqing were first discovered in 1984 during a cultural relics survey conducted by the Yanqing County Cultural Relics Administration, and the date of their excavation was inferred to be between 1000 and 2000 years ago, but the exact date has not been determined.

There is no clear historical record of the occupants of the ancient cliff dwellings, and the most widely accepted speculation about the occupants is that they were Kumo Xi people who lived there from the Tang dynasty to the Five Dynasties and Ten Kingdoms period. The main objection is that the occupants of the ancient cliff dwellings had lived in the area for just over 30 years, and if they were Kumo Xi people, it is not possible to determine whether they were capable of excavating the ancient cliff dwellings. It is also argued that Guyaju was actually a Han dynasty beacon.

In August 1991, the Guyaju Caves officially started to receive visitors. In May 2013, the Guyaju Caves were listed as a Major Historical and Cultural Site Protected at the National Level.

== Structure ==
The Guyaju Caves are the largest cliff dwelling site found in China as of 2016. The site can be divided into two parts, the front ditch and the back ditch, all of which sit east to west and cover an area of 1.5 square kilometers, with a cave chiseling area of 3,931 square meters. There are more than 10 meters long stone stairs from the cave entrance to the ground. There are from 117 to more than 170 stone rooms, divided into more than 350 rooms, most of which are 1.8 meters high and 4 square meters in area, and the largest one is 2 meters high, 3 meters wide and 5.2 meters long. The interior is chiseled with Kang bed-stoves, flue, window holes, and lampstands. The roof is chiseled with a stone slot for collecting rainwater.
