= Taiwan Railways Administration =

Former railway operator in Taiwan

- 臺灣鐵路管理局

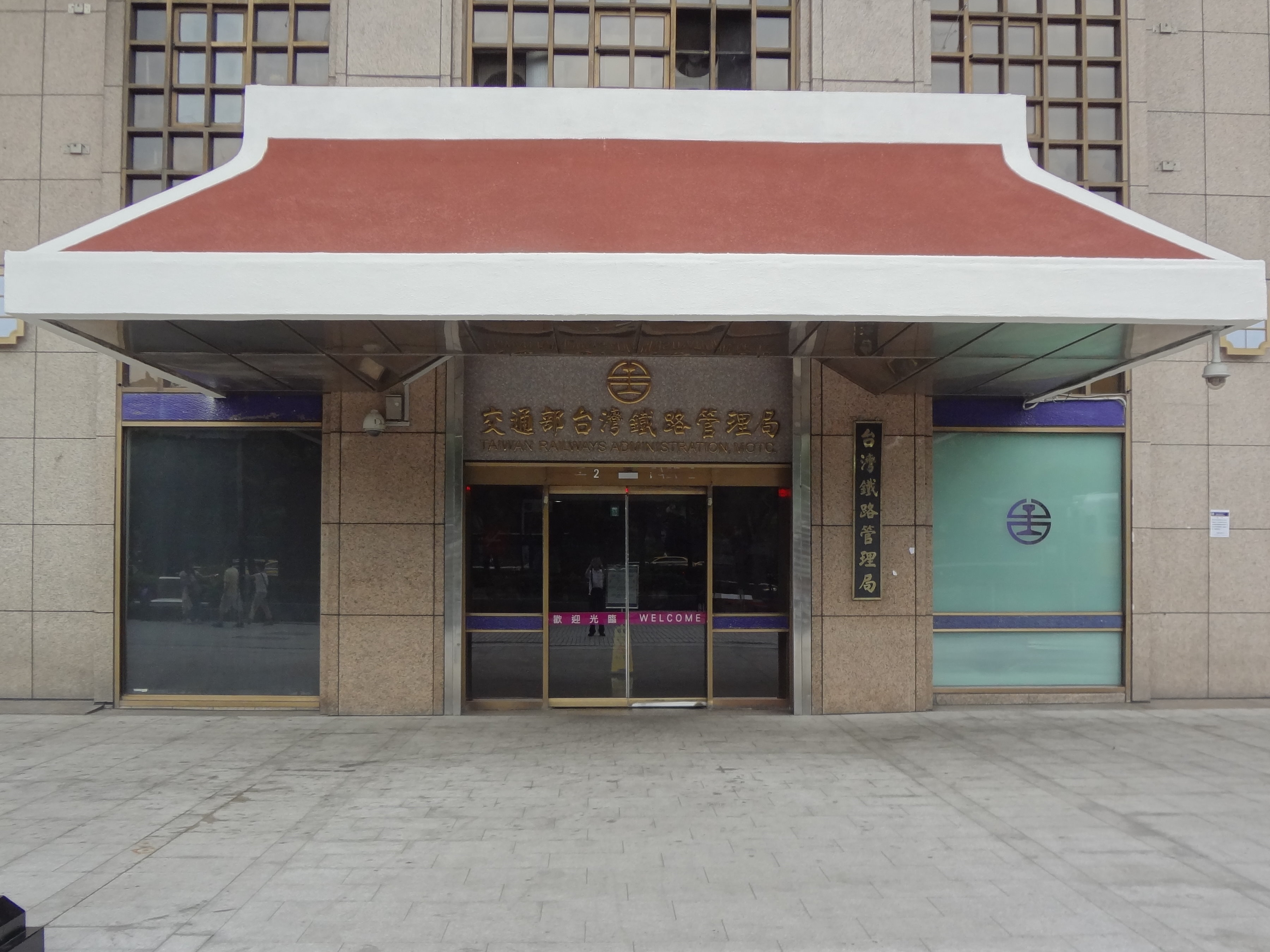

Agency overview
- Formed: 1948
- Preceding agency: Railway Administration Council, Taiwan Provincial Administrative Executive Office
- Dissolved: 2023
- Superseding agency: None; operations succeeded by Taiwan Railway Corporation Limited
- Jurisdiction: Taiwan and Penghu
- Headquarters: Taipei Main Station, Zhongzheng, Taipei
- Agency executive: Du Wei, Director-General (2021–2023)

Chinese name
- Traditional Chinese: 臺灣鐵路管理局
- Simplified Chinese: 台湾铁路管理局
Transcriptions
Standard Mandarin
- Hanyu Pinyin: Táiwān Tiělù Guǎnlǐjú
- Wade–Giles: T'ai^{2}-wan^{1} T'ieh^{3}-lu^{4} Kuan^{3}-li^{3}-chü^{2}
- Tongyong Pinyin: Táiwan Tiělù Guǎnlǐjyú
Hakka
- Romanization: Thòi-vàn Thiet-lu Kón-lî-khiu̍k
Southern Min
- Hokkien POJ: Tâi-oân Thih-lō· Koán-lí-kio̍k
- Tâi-lô: Tâi-uân Thih-lōo Kuán-lí-kio̍k

Taiwan Railways Administration (TRA) (Note: In local languages: Traditional Chinese script: 臺灣鐵路管理局（臺鐵）; Mandarin Pinyin: Táiwān Tiělù Guǎnlǐjú (Táitiě); Hokkien: Tâi-oân Thih-lō͘ Koán-lí-kio̍k (Tâi-thih); Hailu Hakka: Thòi-vân Thiet-lu Kón-lî-khiu̍k (Thòi-thiet)) was a governmental agency of the Republic of China in Taiwan which operated Taiwan Railway from 1948 to 2023. It managed, maintained, and operated conventional passenger and freight railway services on 1,097 km (682 mi) of track. Passenger traffic in 2018 was 231,267,955.

On 1 January 2024, Taiwan Railway Administration became a state-owned corporation, Taiwan Railway Corporation. The agency's headquarters was at Taipei Main Station in Zhongzheng District, Taipei at the time of dissolution, the site which became the headquarter of the new company.

== History ==
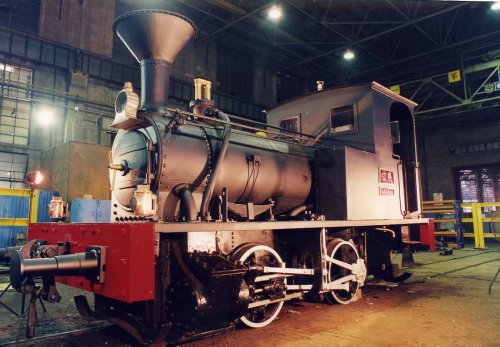
The Teng-yun (Chinese: 騰雲), built by Hohenzollern Locomotive Works, was the first steam locomotive operated in Taiwan.

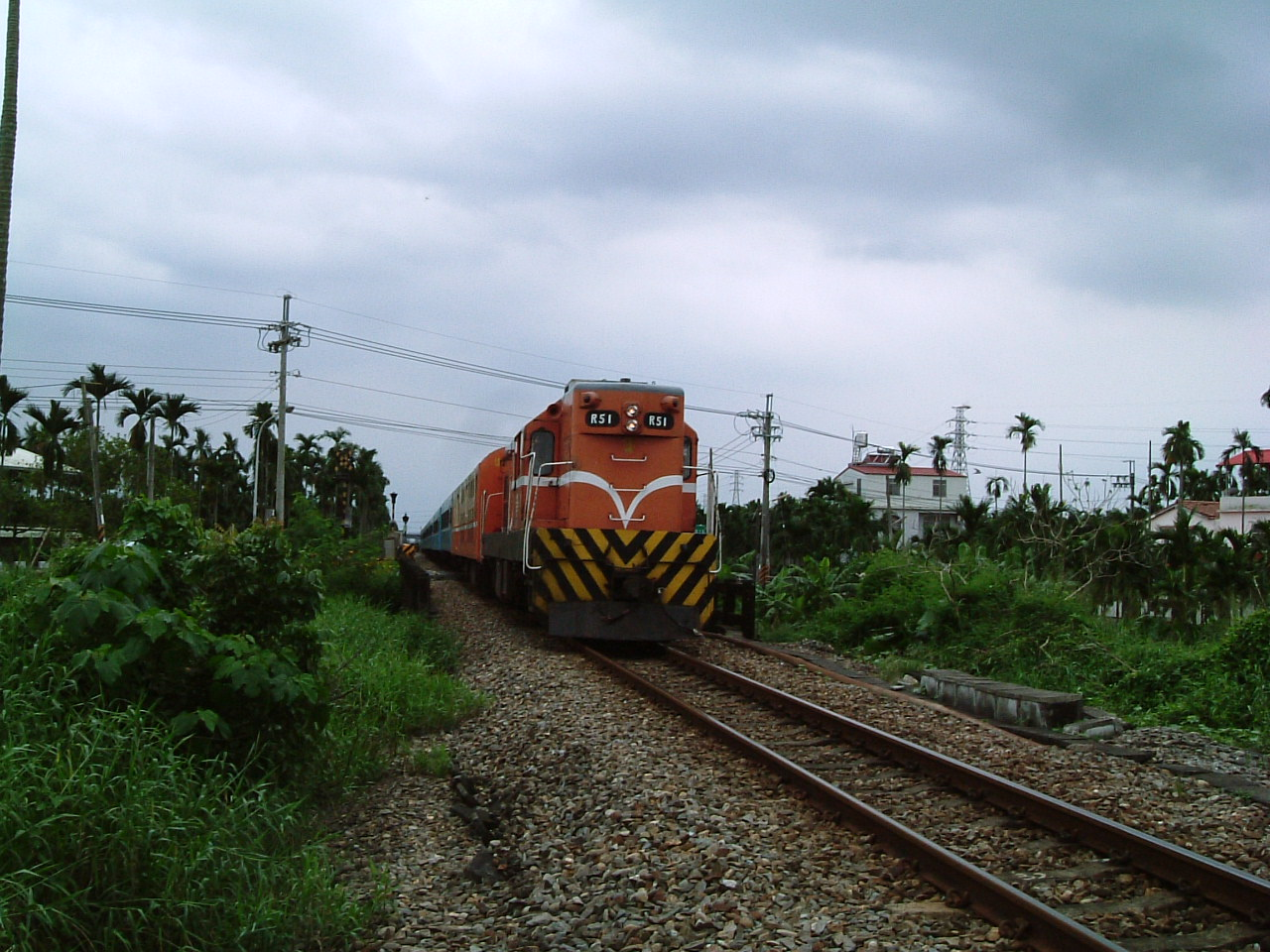
Taiwan Railways' Electro-Motive Division G12-class diesel locomotive R51

The railway between Keelung and Hsinchu was completed during the Qing era in 1893. In 1895, the Qing Empire ceded Formosa (Taiwan) to the Empire of Japan after the First Sino-Japanese War. The line was about 100 kilometres (62 mi) in length but in a poor condition when the Japanese arrived. The railway was rebuilt and expanded under the Railway Department of the Government-General of Taiwan during Japanese rule.

Following the surrender of Japan in the aftermath of World War II, TRA was founded as a government organisation that falls under transport office of Taiwan Provincial Government in 1948. In 1998, it was transferred to the Ministry of Transportation and Communication (MOTC) of the central government and employed around 13,500 people (4,700 in transportation and 7,700 in maintenance titles) and directly operated some 682 route miles of 3’6" (1,067 mm) gauge railways. Three mainlines form a complete circle around the island. TRA's West Coast line and Badu-Hualien section feature mostly double-track, electrification, modern colour light and cab signalling, overrun protection, and centralized traffic control (CTC). South-link line, east coast Taitung (converted from 762 mm gauge), and three "tourist" branches are non-electrified single-track with passing sidings.

=== Corporatization of TRA ===
Because of the several hundred-billions TWD of liabilities, and the legal person type of TRA is considered a block for elasticity operations of railway systems, there were several campaigns and groups set up that aim to take privatization and corporatization actions for TRA since 1990s. In May 2022 the Legislative Yuan approved the Act for Establishment of State-owned Taiwan Railway Co., Ltd. The legislation provided that TRA will transit to a state-owned railway company, set up a fund to handle debts of TRA, retain its employees, and consider raising salaries by 3~5%. TRA was incorporated as Taiwan Railway Corporation on 1 January 2024.

== See also ==
- Taiwan Railway
- Rail transport in Taiwan
- Transportation in Taiwan
- Taiwan High Speed Rail
- Taipei Railway Workshop
- Taiwan Railway Bento
