= Taipei North Gate =

- 臺北府城北門
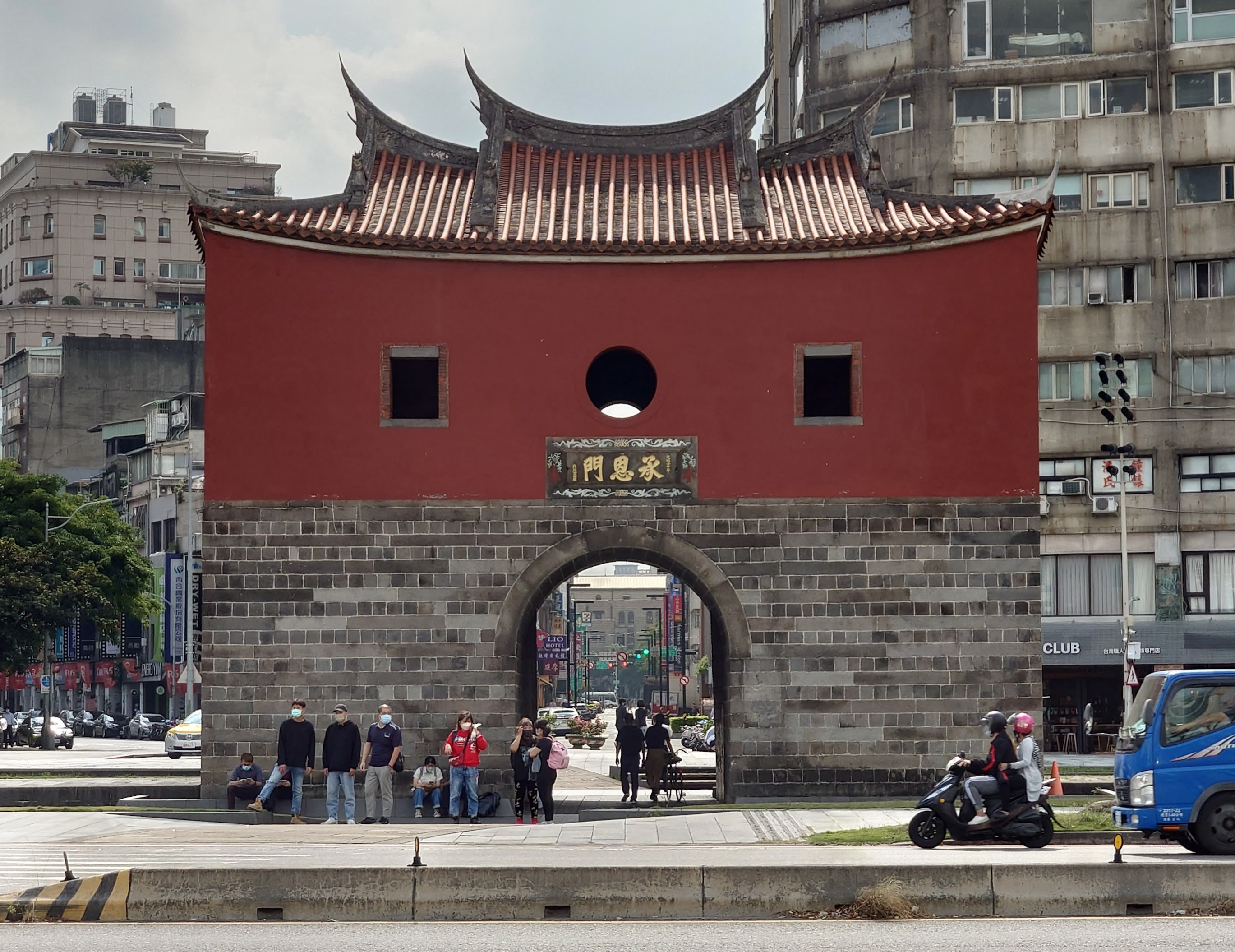
- Interactive map of Taipei North Gate

General information
- Location: Taipei
- Coordinates: 25°02′52″N 121°30′40″E

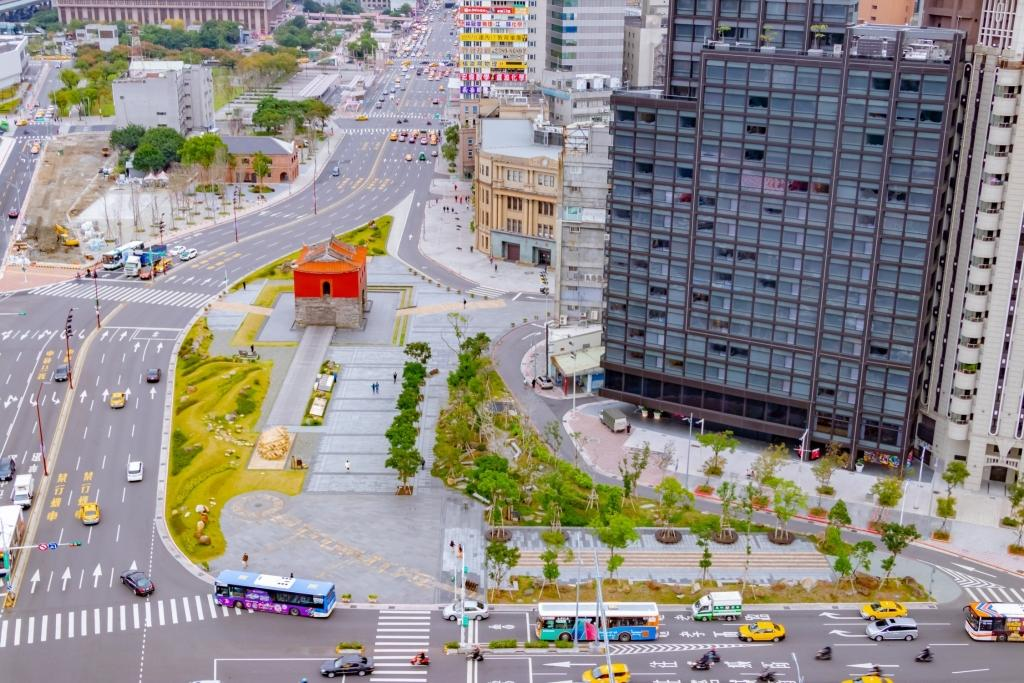

Taipei North Gate (Chinese: 臺北府城北門), formally Cheng'en Gate (Chinese: 承恩門), is a historical gate in Taipei, Taiwan, and a national monument. Constructed in 1884, it is the best-preserved gate of the historical Walls of Taipei. Its design is a two-story closed blockhouse of solid construction with traditional Chinese wooden roof truss and streamlined carved ornamentations. Important in the Qing layout of the city, restoring it to visual prominence in the city has been a feature of recent urban planning. It gives its name to Beimen metro station.

== Bibliography ==
- 王庭玫, ed. (2007). 臺北市古蹟巡覽 [Historical sites in Taipei] (in Chinese). Vol. 2. Taipei: 藝術家. ISBN 9789867034373.
