= Fushengzhuang railway station =

Inner Mongolia railway station

Fushengzhuang railway station (Chinese: 福生庄站) is a station of Jingbao Railway in Inner Mongolia, its postal code is 012311. The station was first constructed in 1922 as part of the Tangshan-Baotou railway. The station has a distance of 587 kilometers (365 miles) from the Beijing railway station, and 243 kilometers (151 miles) from the Baotou railway station. The next westbound station is Sandaoying railway station 7 kilometers (4.3 miles) away, while the next eastbound station is Zhuozishan railway station 14 kilometers (8.7 miles) away. The station is under the administration of China Railway Hohhot Group.

== See also ==
- List of stations on Jingbao railway
