= Tianzhen railway station =

Railway station in Tianzhen, China

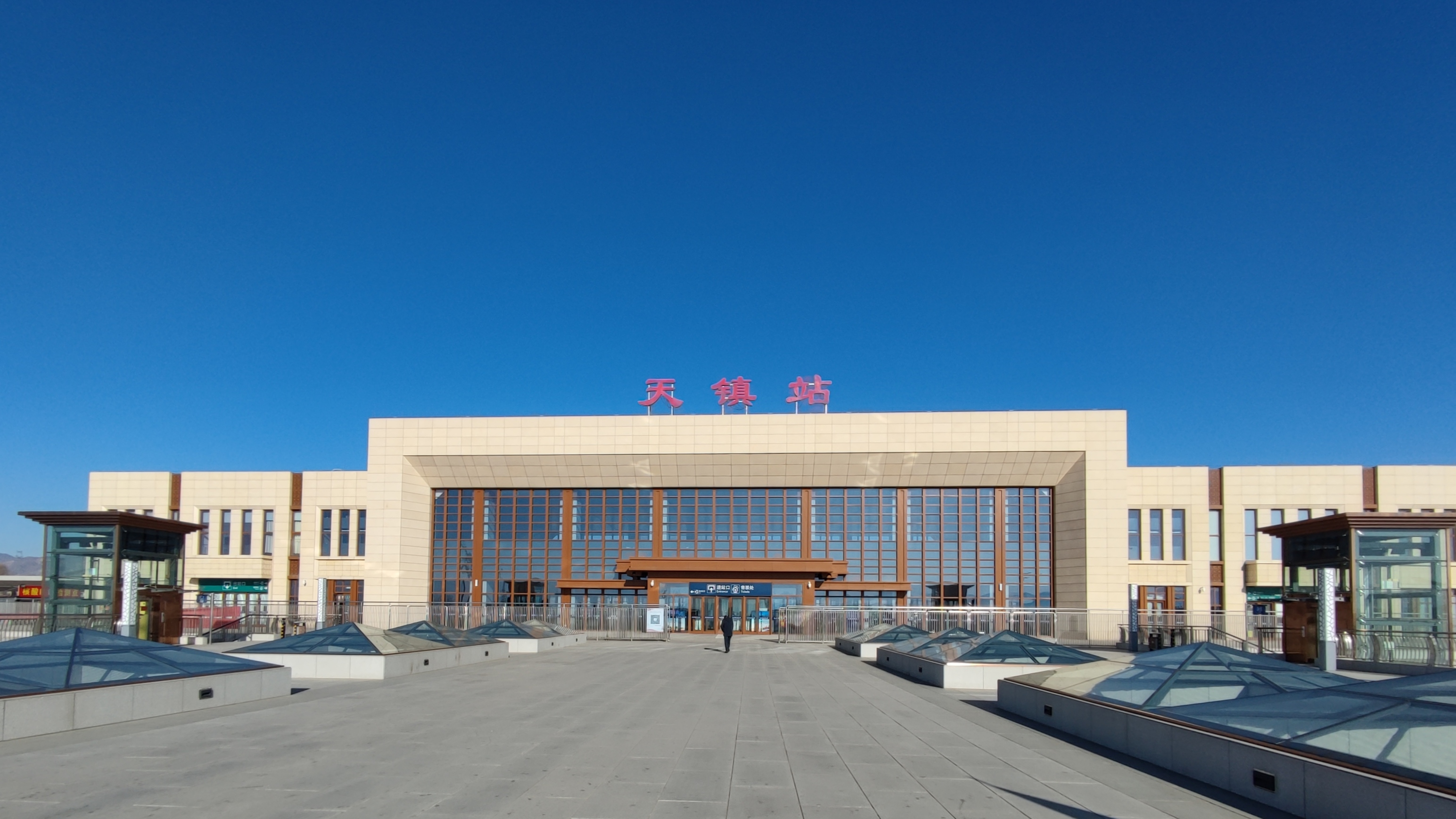
Tianzhen railway station

Tianzhen railway station (Chinese: 天镇站; pinyin: Tiān zhèn zhàn) is a station in Chengguan Town (城关镇), Tianzhen, Shanxi. Built in 1911, the station is 296 kilometres (184 mi) from Beijing railway station and 536 kilometres (333 mi) from Baotou railway station. It is under the jurisdiction of the Datong Railway Branch (局大同铁路分) of the China Railway Beijing Group and is a fourth-class station.

Preceding station	China Railway	Following station
Chaigoubu towards Beijing North	Beijing–Baotou railway	Yanggao towards Baotou
Preceding station	China Railway High-speed	Following station
Yanggao South towards Datong South	Datong–Zhangjiakou high-speed railway	Huai'an towards Zhangjiakou (opened in 1957)
