= Juyongguan railway station =

Railway station in Beijing, China

Coordinates: 40°18′N 116°03.6′E

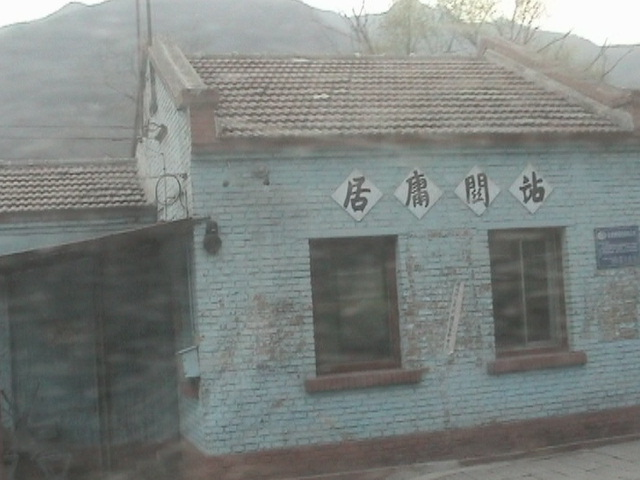
Juyongguan railway station

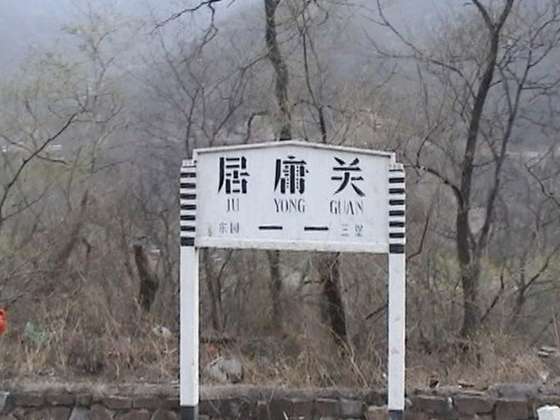
Juyongguan railway station sign

Juyongguan railway station (simplified Chinese: 居庸关站; traditional Chinese: 居庸關站; pinyin: Jūyōngguān Zhàn) is a railway station in Beijing, near the Juyongguan section of Great Wall. The station was built in 1910 to increase the transportation capacity of the Nankou-Kangzhuang railway section.

== Service ==
No passenger trains currently stop at this station. Line S2 of the Beijing Suburban Railway passes through this station without stopping.

Preceding station	China Railway	Following station
Dongyuan towards Beijing North	Beijing–Baotou railway	Sanpu towards Baotou
