= Nankou railway station =

Railway station in Beijing, China

Coordinates: 40°14′16.89″N 116°07′22.20″E

Nankou 南口
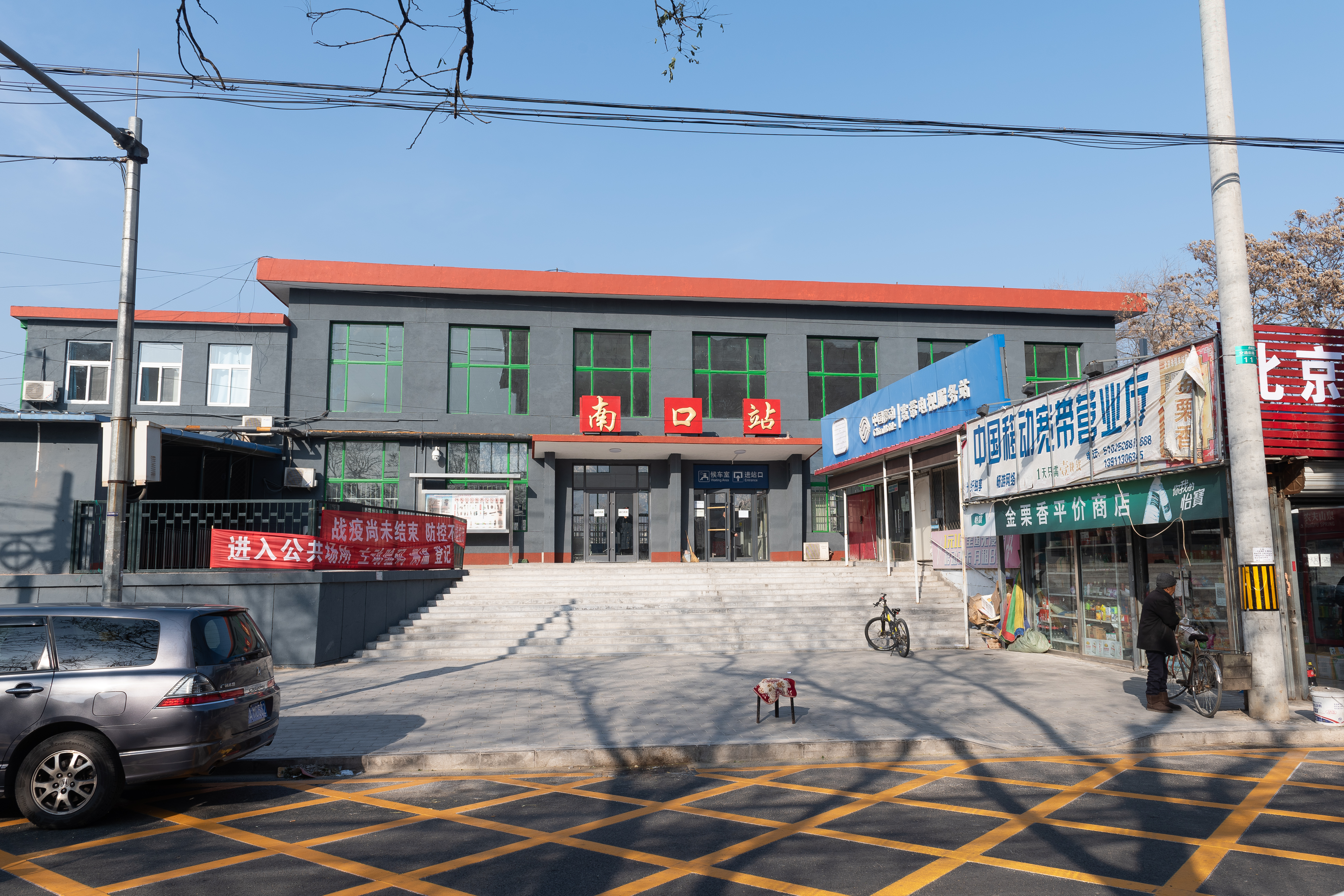

General information
- Location: Nankou, Changping District, Beijing; China
- Line(s): Beijing–Baotou Railway; Line S2
- Platforms: 2 islands (one for freight only) and one side

Other information
- Station code: TMIS code: 12176; Telegraph code: NKP; Pinyin code: NKO
- Classification: 2nd class station

History
- Opened: 1906

Services
Preceding station	China Railway	Following station
Changping towards Beijing North	Beijing–Baotou railway	Dongyuan towards Baotou
Preceding station	Beijing Suburban Railway	Following station
Huangtudian Terminus	Line S2	Badaling towards Shacheng or Yanqing

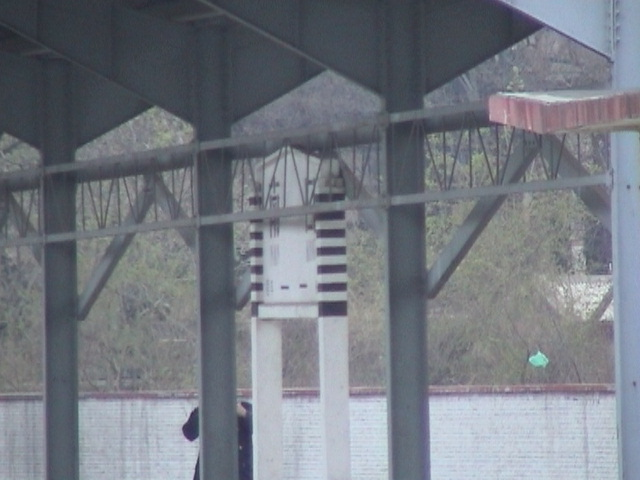
Nankou railway station

Nankou railway station (Chinese: 南口站; pinyin: Nánkǒu zhàn) is a railway station in Nankou, Changping District, Beijing. The station was opened in 1906.

== Service ==
This station is served exclusively by Line S2 of the Beijing Suburban Railway.

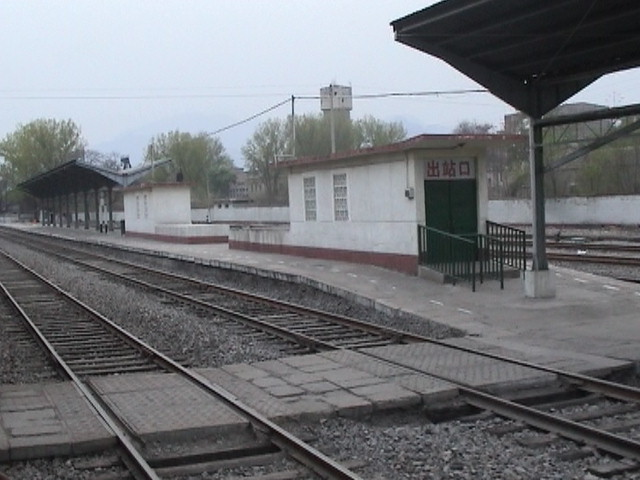
Nankou railw
