= Xiaxiaobao railway station =

Railway station in Datong, China

The Xiaxiaobao railway station (pinyin: Xià xiǎo bǎo zhàn) is a station in Xuanjiata Township (宣家塔乡), Tianzhen County, Shanxi. Built in 1943, the station is 288 kilometres (179 mi) away from Beijing railway station and 544 kilometres (338 mi) from Baotou railway station. It is under the jurisdiction of the Datong Railway Branch (局大同铁路分) of the China Railway Beijing Group and is currently a fifth-class station.

== See also ==
- List of stations on Jingbao railway
