= Xibozi railway station =

Railway station in Beijing, China

Coordinates: 40.3633°N 115.9592°E

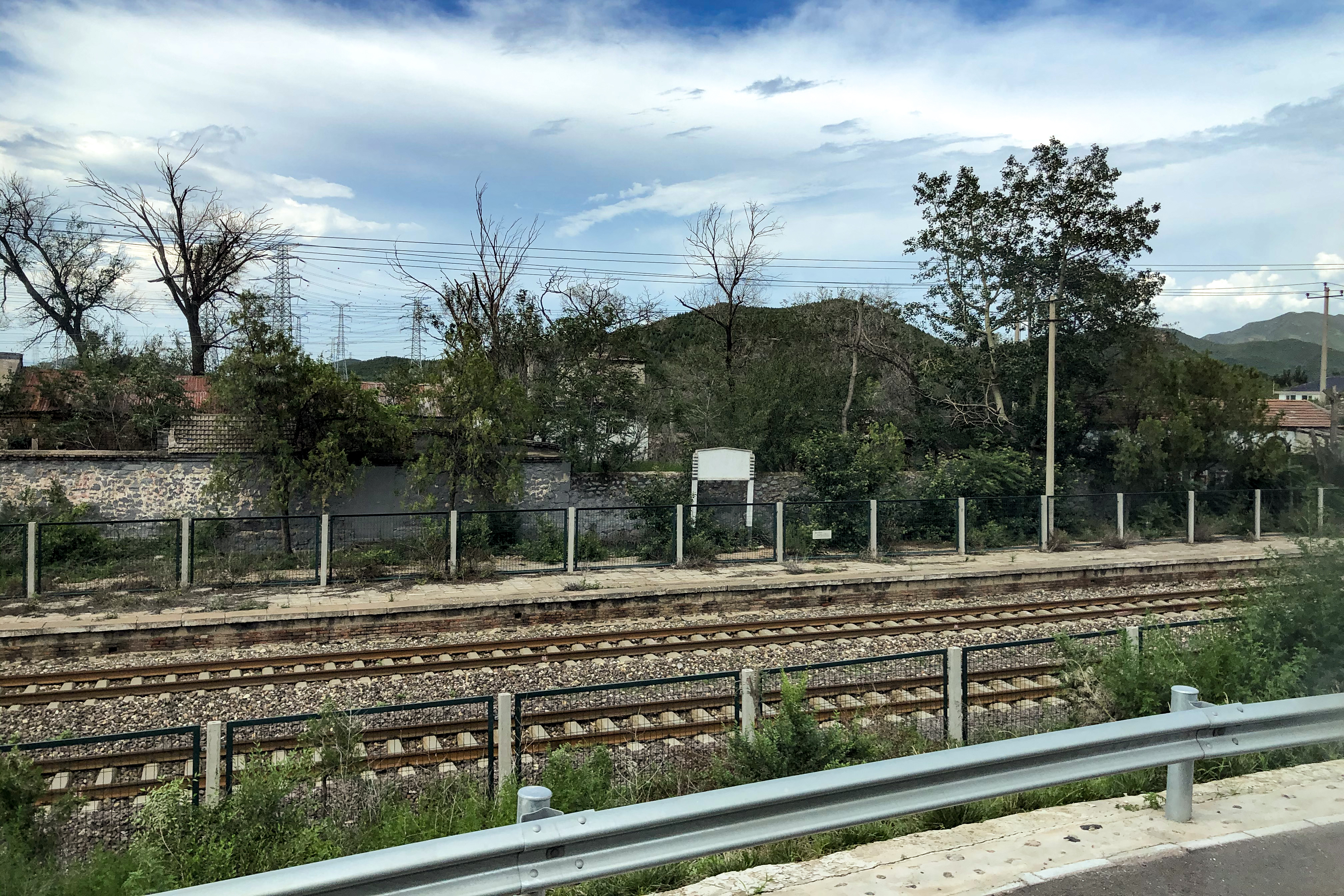
Xibozi Station, closed (July 2020)

Xibozi station (Chinese: 西拨子站; pinyin: Xībōzǐ zhàn) is a former fourth-class railway station in Badaling Town, Yanqing District, Beijing. Located 3 kilometres (1.9 mi) east of Badaling station and 6.5 kilometres (4.0 mi) west of Kangzhuang station, it was on the historic Beijing–Zhangjiakou Railway line and represents over a century of history.

Passenger services were suspended around 2011, leading to closure of the station. To the north of the old station house, there is an entrance to an underground bunker which railway historian Wang Wei has suggested was built by the Imperial Japanese Army. As of 2019, Wang had applied for recognition of Xibozi station as a cultural relic.

== See also ==
- List of stations on Jingbao railway
