= Suojiacun railway station =

Railway station in Inner Mongolia, China

Suojiacun railway station (Chinese: 索家村站; pinyin: Suǒ jiācūn zhàn) is a station in Suojiacun, Qahar Right Front Banner, Inner Mongolia, China. Built in 1989, the station is 470 kilometres (290 mi) away from Beijing railway station and 362 kilometres (225 mi) away from Baotou railway station. It is under the jurisdiction of the Jining Railway Branch (局集宁铁路分) of the China Railway Hohhot Group and is a fifth-class railway station.

== See also ==
- List of stations on Jingbao railway
