= Minzu railway station =

Minzu railway station can refer to the following stations:

- Minzu railway station (Taiwan)
- Minzu railway station (Inner Mongolia)
