= Donghuayuan railway station =

Railway station in Hebei, China

Coordinates: 40°20′45″N 115°47′40″E

Donghuayuan 东花园站
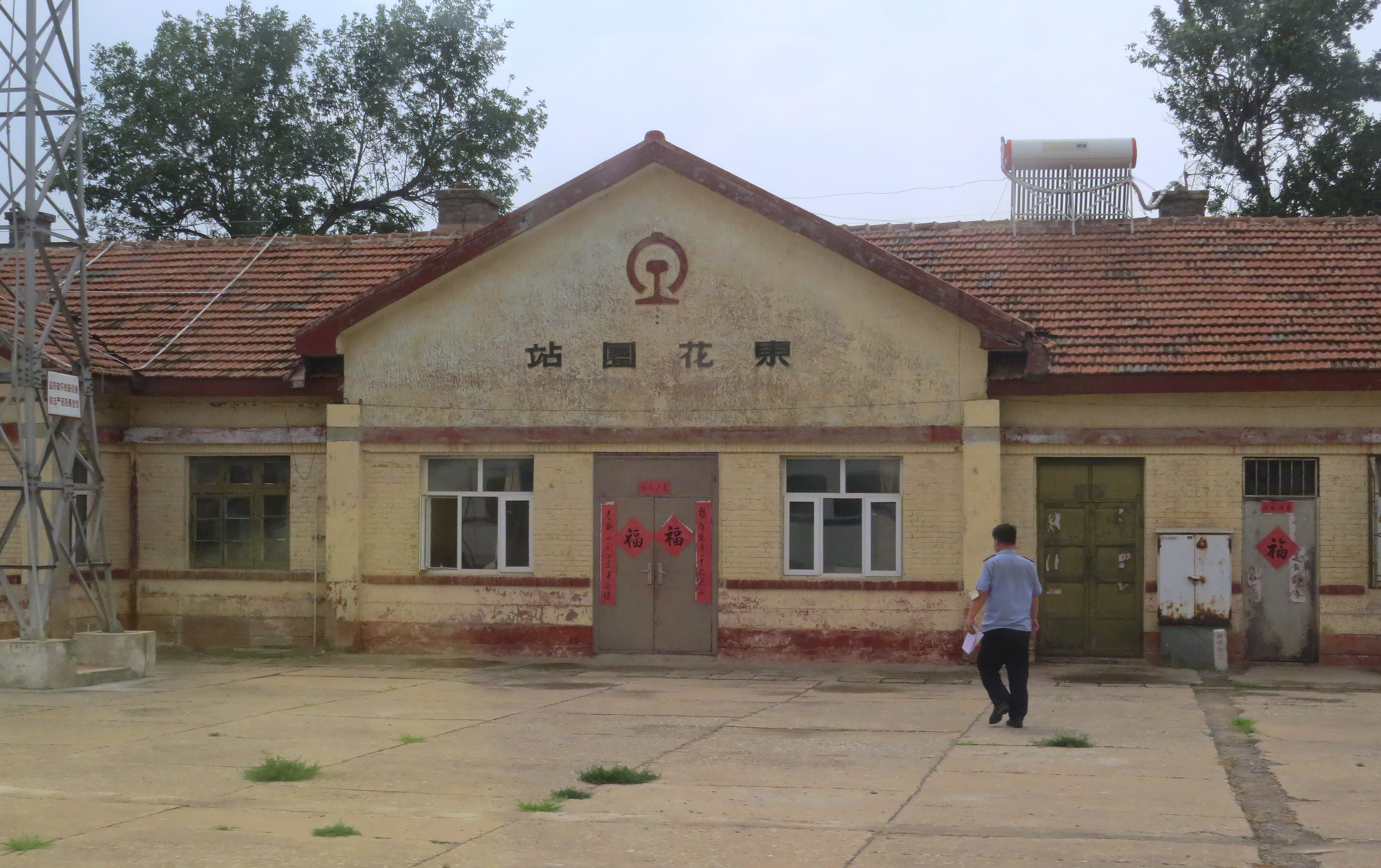

General information
- Location: Huailai County, Zhangjiakou, Hebei; China
- Line: Beijing-Baotou railway

Other information
- Station code: DNP

Donghuayuan railway station (Chinese: 东花园站; pinyin: Dōng huāyuán zhàn), formerly known as Huailai Station (Chinese: 怀来站; pinyin: Huái lái zhàn), is a station in Donghuayuan, Huailai County, Hebei, China. Built in 1954, the railway staion is 103 kilometres (64 mi) away from Beijing and 729 kilometres (453 mi) from Baotou railway station. It is under the jurisdiction of the China Railway Beijing Group and is a fourth-class station.

== See also ==
- List of stations on Jingbao railway
