= Taigemu railway station =

Railway station in Inner Mongolia, China

Coordinates: 40.7472°N 111.4813°E

Taigemu railway station (Chinese: 台阁牧站; pinyin: Tái gé mù zhàn) is a station in Caisheng Village (裁生村), Tumed Left Banner, Inner Mongolia, China. Built in 1923, the station is 686 kilometres (426 mi) from Beijing railway station and 146 kilometres (91 mi) from Baotou railway station. It is under the jurisdiction of the Jining Railway Branch (局集宁铁路分) of the China Railway Hohhot Group and is a fourth-class station.

== See also ==
- List of stations on Jingbao railway
