= Datong East railway station =

Railway station in Datong, China

Datong East railway station 大同东站

General information
- Location: Datong, Shanxi; China
- Coordinates: 40°06′41″N 113°21′14″E
- Operator: China Railway Beijing Group (Datong Railway Branch)
- Distance: 377 km from Beijing; 455 km from Baotou railway station
- Tracks: 27

Other information
- Classification: Fourth-class station

History
- Opened: 1912
- Rebuilt: 1960
- Former names: Santiaojian (三条涧站)
Location
- Location within Shanxi

The Datong East railway station (Chinese: 大同东站; pinyin: Dàtóng dōng zhàn), formerly known as the Santiaojian Station (Chinese: 三条涧站; pinyin: Sāntiáo jiàn zhàn), is a station in the suburbs of Datong City, Shanxi. Built in 1912, the station is 377 kilometres (234 mi) away from Beijing railway station and 455 kilometres (283 mi) away from Baotou railway station. It is under the jurisdiction of the Datong Railway Branch (局大同铁路分) of the China Railway Beijing Group and currently a fourth-class station. It has a main line length of 11.07 kilometres (6.88 mi). In 1960, the station increased to comprise 27 tracks.

== See also ==
- List of stations on Jingbao railway
