= Badaling railway station =

Railway station in Beijing, China

Badaling 八达岭
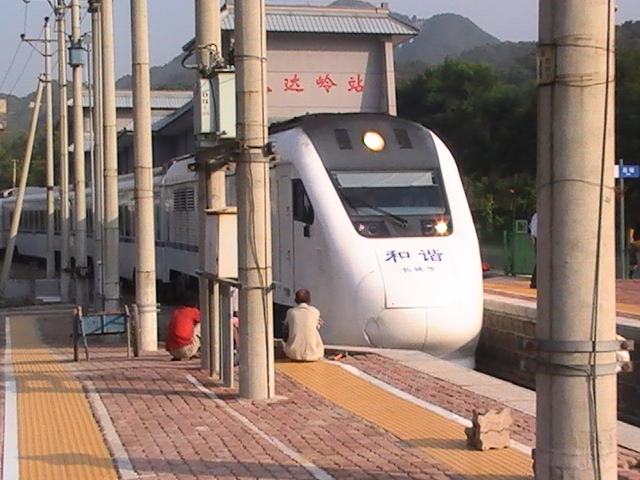
- Badaling railway station

General information
- Location: Yanqing, Beijing; China
- Coordinates: 40°21′34″N 115°59′40″E
- Line(s): Jingbao Railway; Line S2

History
- Opened: 1979

Badaling railway station is a station of Jingbao Railway in Beijing. The station opened in 1979. It is a stop on Line S2 of the Beijing Suburban Railway.

It should not be confused with the high-speed rail station Badaling Great Wall railway station which opened in December 2019.

== See also ==
List of stations on Jingbao railway

Preceding station	Beijing Suburban Railway	Following station
Nankou towards Huangtudian	Line S2	Kangzhuang towards Shacheng
Nankou towards Huangtudian	Line S2	Yanqing Terminus
