= Sanchakou railway station =

Railway station in Inner Mongolia, China

Coordinates: 41.0258°N 112.9318°E

The Sanchakou railway station (Chinese: 三岔口站; pinyin: Sān chàkǒu zhàn) is a station in Sanchakou Township, Qahar Right Front Banner, Inner Mongolia. Built in 1921, the station is 524 kilometres (326 mi) away from Beijing railway station and 308 kilometres (191 mi) from Baotou railway station. The station is under the jurisdiction of the Jining Railway Branch (局集宁铁路分) of the Hohhot Railway Bureau (呼和浩特铁路局) and is currently a fourth-class station.

== See also ==
- List of stations on Jingbao railway
