= Dalibao railway station =

Railway station in Inner Mongolia, China

Coordinates: 40.72882°N 111.37981°E

The Dalibao railway station (Chinese: 大里堡站; pinyin: Dàlǐ bǎo zhàn) is a station in Dalibao village (大里堡村), Tumed Left Banner, in Inner Mongolia. Constructed in 1923, the station is located 696 kilometres (432 mi) away from Beijing railway station and 136 kilometres (85 mi) away from Baotou railway station. It is under the jurisdiction of the Jining Railway Branch (局集宁铁路分) of the China Railway Hohhot Group. It is a fifth-class station.

== See also ==
- List of stations on Jingbao railway
