= Gongjiban railway station =

Railway station in Inner Mongolia, China

Coordinates: 40.5583°N 110.3670°E

Gongjiban railway station (Chinese: 公积坂站; pinyin: Gōngjībǎn zhàn) is a station in Gongjiban Township (公积板乡), Baotou, Inner Mongolia, China. Built in 1922, the station is 786 kilometres (488 mi) from Beijing railway station and 46 kilometres (29 mi) from Baotou railway station. It is under the jurisdiction of the Jining Railway Branch (局集宁铁路分) of the China Railway Hohhot Group and is a fourth-class station.

== See also ==
- List of stations on Jingbao railway
