= Yongwangzhuang railway station =

Railway station in Inner Mongolia, China

Yongwangzhuang railway station (Chinese: 永王庄站; pinyin: Yǒng wáng zhuāng zhàn) is a station in Yongwangzhuang Village (永王庄村), Fengzhen, Inner Mongolia, China. Built in 1919, the station is 452 kilometres (281 mi) from Beijing railway station and 380 kilometres (240 mi) from Baotou railway station. It is under the jurisdiction of the Jining Railway Branch (局集宁铁路分) of the China Railway Hohhot Group and is a fourth-class station.

In 1936, it was reported that a freight train derailed at the station. According to the train driver, "the track dimensions were significantly different", causing the derailment.

== See also ==
- List of stations on Jingbao railway
