= XLP =

XLP may refer to:

== Electronics ==
- Extreme-low power, a class of sub-ultra-low power (ULP) electronics at the very forefront of current technology since ca. 2015
- XLP, a variant of the audio XLR connector
- MIPS XLP, a 64-bit microprocessor from MIPS Technologies
- digEplayer XLP, a portable digital media player

== Medicine ==
- X-linked lymphoproliferative disease, a disease in hematology
- X-linked protoporphyria, a disease, also called erythropoietic protoporphyria

== Other uses ==
- XLP, All Hallows-on-the-Wall, London, England, UK; an urban youth charity
- Lepontic language (ISO 639 language code xlp), an extinct Ancient Alpine Celtic language
- Xibali railway station (station code XLP), Xibali, Huailai, Hebei. China

== See also ==
- Zero-power device, (typically battery-less) ULP/XLP devices powered through energy harvesting
