= Wanshuiquan railway station =

Railway station in Inner Mongolia, China

Coordinates: 40.56898°N 110.01881°E

Wanshuiquan railway station is a station in Baotou, Inner Mongolia, China. Built in 1958, the station is 824 kilometres (512 mi) from Beijing railway station and 8 kilometres (5.0 mi) from Baotou railway station. It is under the jurisdiction of the Baotou Railway Branch (局包头铁路分) of the China Railway Hohhot Group and is a fourth-class station.

== See also ==
- List of stations on Jingbao railway
