= Kangzhuang =

Kangzhuang may refer to:

- Kangzhuang, Beijing, China
- Kangzhuang, Hebei, China
- Kangzhuang railway station, Beijing, China
- Kangzhuang station, Chongqing, China
