= Dongyuan railway station =

Dongyuan railway station can refer to:

- Dongyuan railway station (Beijing), a station in Changping District, Beijing, China
- Heyuan North railway station, a Ganzhou–Shenzhen high-speed railway station in Dongyuan County, Heyuan, Guangdong Province, China
