= Yanggao railway station =

Railway station in the People's Republic of China

Yanggao railway station is a station on the Beijing–Baotou railway. It is located in Datong City, Shanxi.

Preceding station	China Railway	Following station
Tianzhen towards Beijing North	Beijing–Baotou railway	Datong towards Baotou
