= Gujiabao railway station =

Railway station in Inner Mongolia, China

Gujiabao railway station (Chinese: 姑家堡站; pinyin: Gū jiā bǎo zhàn) is a station in Gujiabao Village (姑家堡村), Zhuozi County, Inner Mongolia, China. Built in 1989, it is 570 kilometres (350 mi) away from Beijing railway station and 262 kilometres (163 mi) from Baotou railway station. It is under the jurisdiction of the Jining Railway Branch (局集宁铁路分) of the China Railway Hohhot Group and is a fifth-class station.

== See also ==
- List of stations on Jingbao railway
