= Sanchakou Township =

Sanchakou Township 三岔口乡 ᠰᠠᠨ ᠴᠠ ᠺᠧᠦ ᠰᠢᠶᠠᠩ
- Township
- Location in Inner Mongolia
- Coordinates: 41.0242°N 112.931°E
- Country: People's Republic of China
- Autonomous region: Inner Mongolia
- Prefecture-level city: Ulanqab
- Banner: Qahar Right Front Banner
- Time zone: UTC+8 (China Standard)

Sanchakou Township (simplified Chinese: 三岔口乡; traditional Chinese: 三岔口鄉; pinyin: Sānchàkǒu Xiāng) San tsa kjev šijan (Mongolian: ᠳ᠋ᠦᠩ
ᠹᠧᠩ; Сан ца кев шиян) is a township under the administration of Qahar Right Front Banner in Inner Mongolia, China. As of 2018, it has 18 villages under its administration.

The Sanchakou railway station is a station of the Beijing–Baotou railway.
