= Xuanhua railway station =

Railway station in Zhangjiakou, China

Xuanhua 宣化
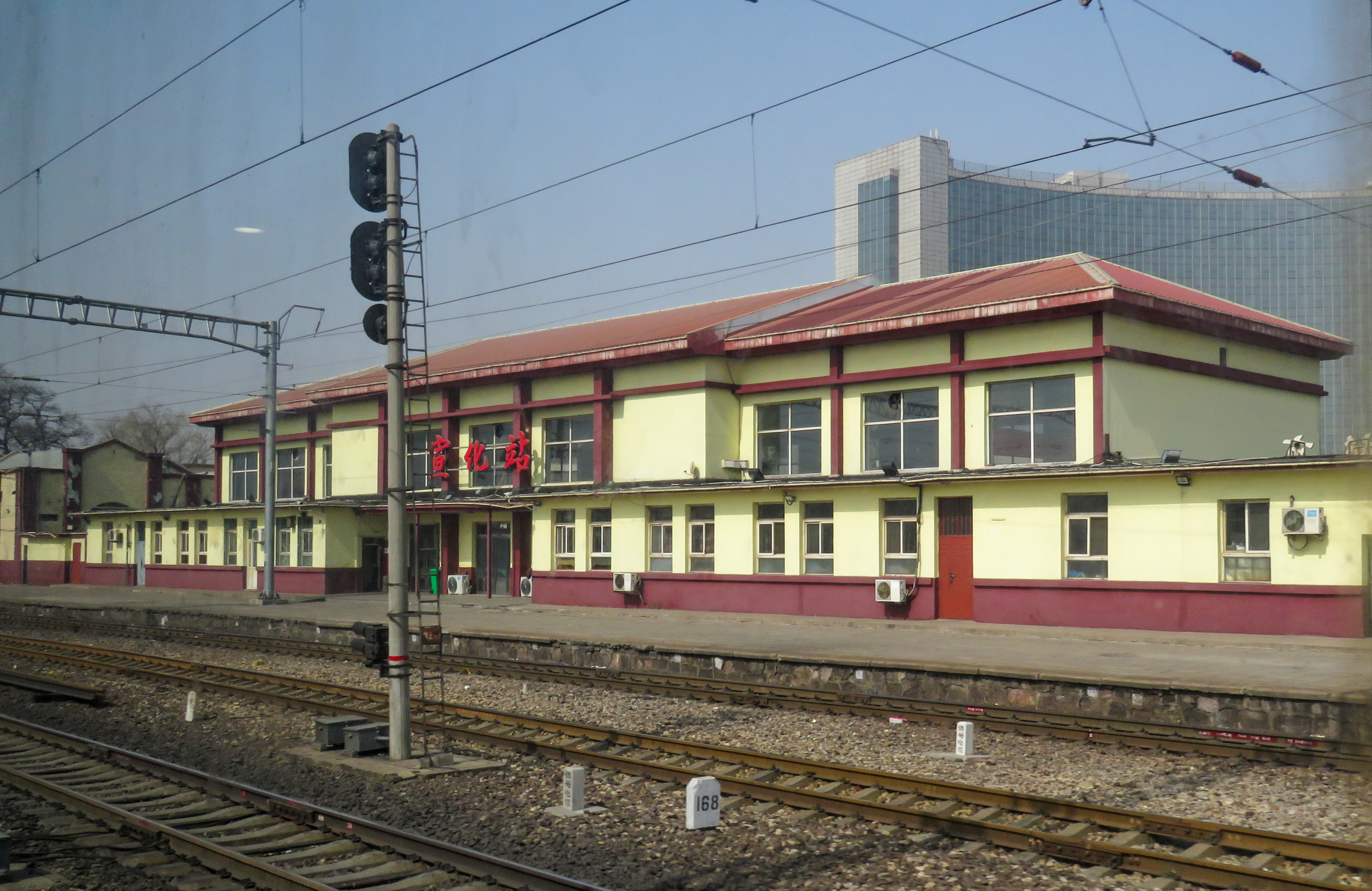

General information
- Location: Xuanhua District, Zhangjiakou, Hebei; China
- Coordinates: 40°35′53″N 115°03′19″E
- Operator: Beijing Railway Bureau, China Railway Corporation
- Lines: Beijing–Baotou railway; Xuanhua–Pangjiabu railway; Xuanyan railway
- Platforms: 2

History
- Opened: 1909
- Former names: Xuanhuafu
Location
- Location within Hebei

Xuanhua railway station (Chinese: 宣化站; pinyin: Xuānhuā Zhàn) is a railway station on the Beijing–Baotou railway, Xuanhua–Pangjiabu railway and Xuanyan railway (宣烟铁路). The station is located in Zhangjiakou, Hebei.

== History ==
The station opened as Xuanhuafu station (Chinese: 宣化府站; pinyin: Xuānhuāfǔ Zhàn) in 1909. Xuanhuafu station was renamed Xuanhua station in 1914.

== See also ==
- List of stations on Jingbao railway
- Xuanhua North railway station
