= Luowenzao railway station =

Railway station in Datong, China

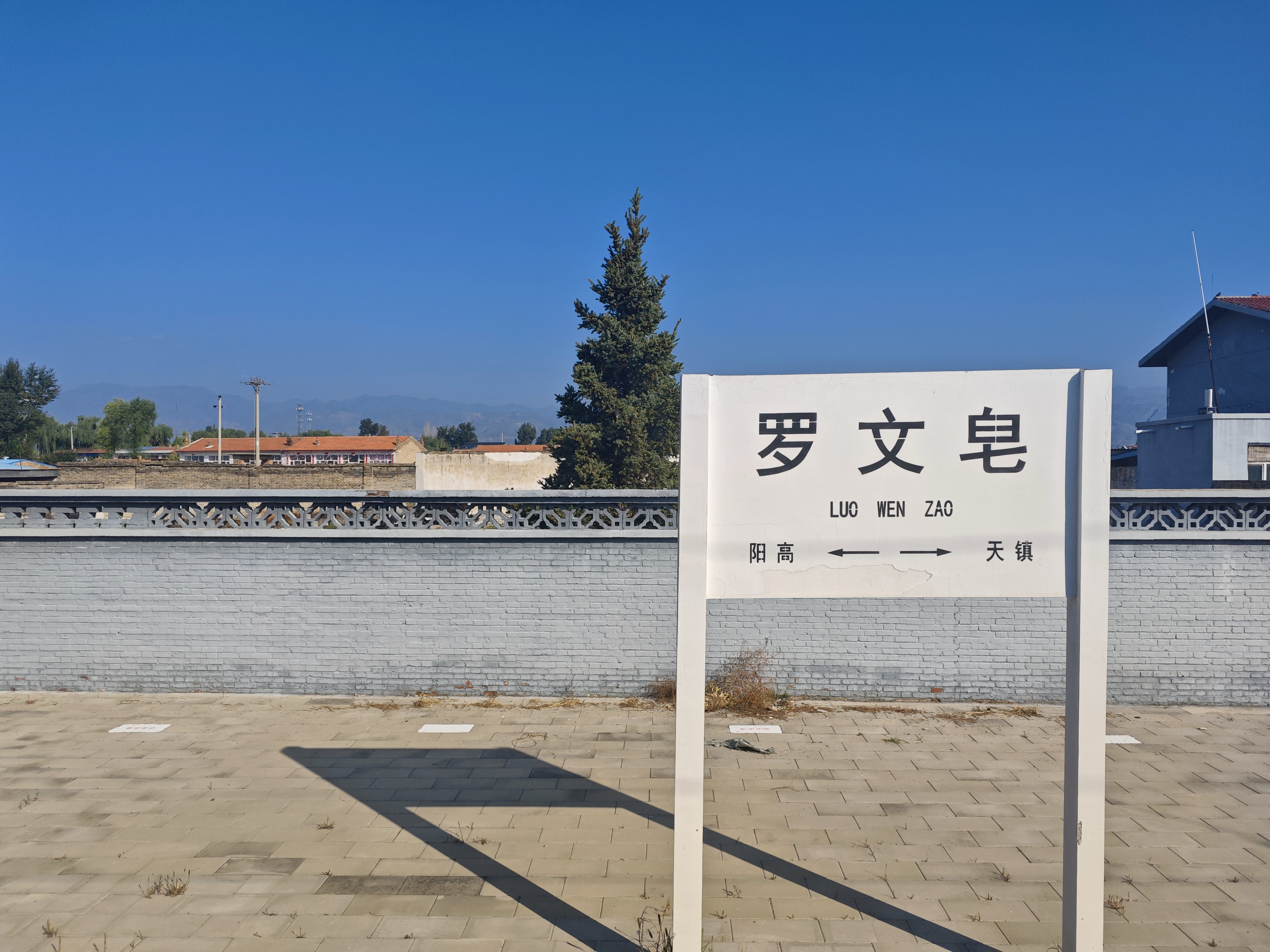
Luowenzao railway station

Luowenzao railway station is a station of Jingbao Railway in Datong City, Shanxi.

== See also ==
- List of stations on Jingbao railway
