= Xin'anzhuang railway station =

Railway station in Inner Mongolia

Xin'anzhuang railway station is a station of Jingbao Railway. It is located in Inner Mongolia.

== See also ==
- List of stations on Jingbao railway
