= Dongyuan railway station (Beijing) =

Railway station in Beijing, China

Coordinates: 40°16′36″N 116°05′40″E

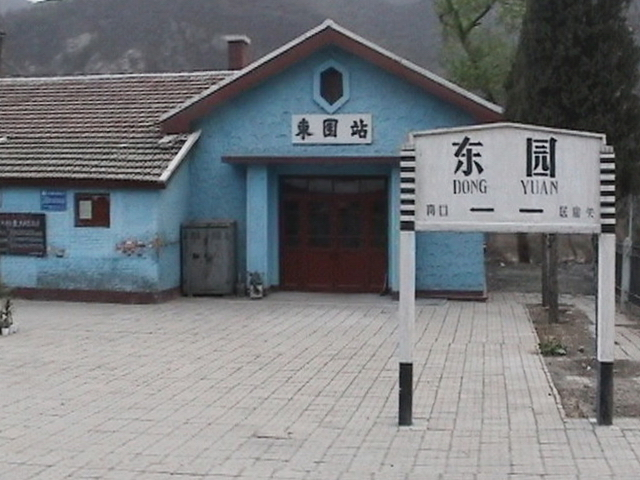
Dongyuan railway station

Dongyuan railway station (simplified Chinese: 东园站; traditional Chinese: 東園站; pinyin: Dōngyuán Zhàn) is a railway station on the Beijing–Baotou Railway. It is located in Beijing.

== Schedules ==
No passenger trains currently stop at this station. Line S2 of the Beijing Suburban Railway passes through this station without stopping.

Preceding station	China Railway	Following station
Nankou towards Beijing North	Beijing–Baotou railway	Juyongguan towards Baotou
