= Hala railway station =

Railway station in China

Coordinates: 40°53′42″N 112°46′1″E

Hala 哈拉
Location

Hala railway station is a station of Jingbao Railway. It is located in Inner Mongolia.

== See also ==
- List of stations on Jingbao railway
