= Sanbashu railway station =

Railway station in Inner Mongolia, China

Coordinates: 40.624589°N 110.831074°E

Sanbashu railway station is a station of Jingbao Railway in Inner Mongolia.

== See also ==
- List of stations on Jingbao railway
