= Tuguiwula railway station =

Railway station in Inner Mongolia, China

Coordinates: 40.7860°N 113.2051°E

Tuguiwula railway station is a station of Jingbao Railway. It is located in Inner Mongolia.

== See also ==
- List of stations on Jingbao railway
