= Anju railway station =

Railway station in Inner Mongolia, China

Anju railway station (Chinese: 安居站) is a station of Jingbao Railway in Inner Mongolia.

== Station information ==
Anju railway station is located in Anju Village, Zhuozi County, Inner Mongolia Autonomous Region, with a postal code of 012312.

The station was built in 1989 and is 597 kilometers away from Beijing Station and 235 kilometers from Baotou Station. It is under the jurisdiction of the Hohhot Railway Bureau and currently serves as a Class 5 station.

Services include boarding of passengers, as well as luggage and parcel consignments. However, it does not operate freight services.

== See also ==
- List of stations on Jingbao railway
