= Zhoushizhuang railway station =

Railway station in Datong, Shanxi, China

Coordinates: 40°06′57″N 113°27′59″E

Zhoushizhuang railway station is a station of Jingbao Railway. It is located in Datong City, Shanxi.

== See also ==
- List of stations on Jingbao railway
