= Wangyuzhuang railway station =

Railway station in China

Coordinates: 40.7531°N 114.6514°E

Wangyuzhuang railway station is a station of Jingbao Railway. It is located in Hebei.

== See also ==
- List of stations on Jingbao railway
