= Xinzhuangzi railway station =

Railway station in Xinzhuangzi, China

Coordinates: 40°31′06″N 115°10′49″E

Xinzhuangzi 辛庄子站
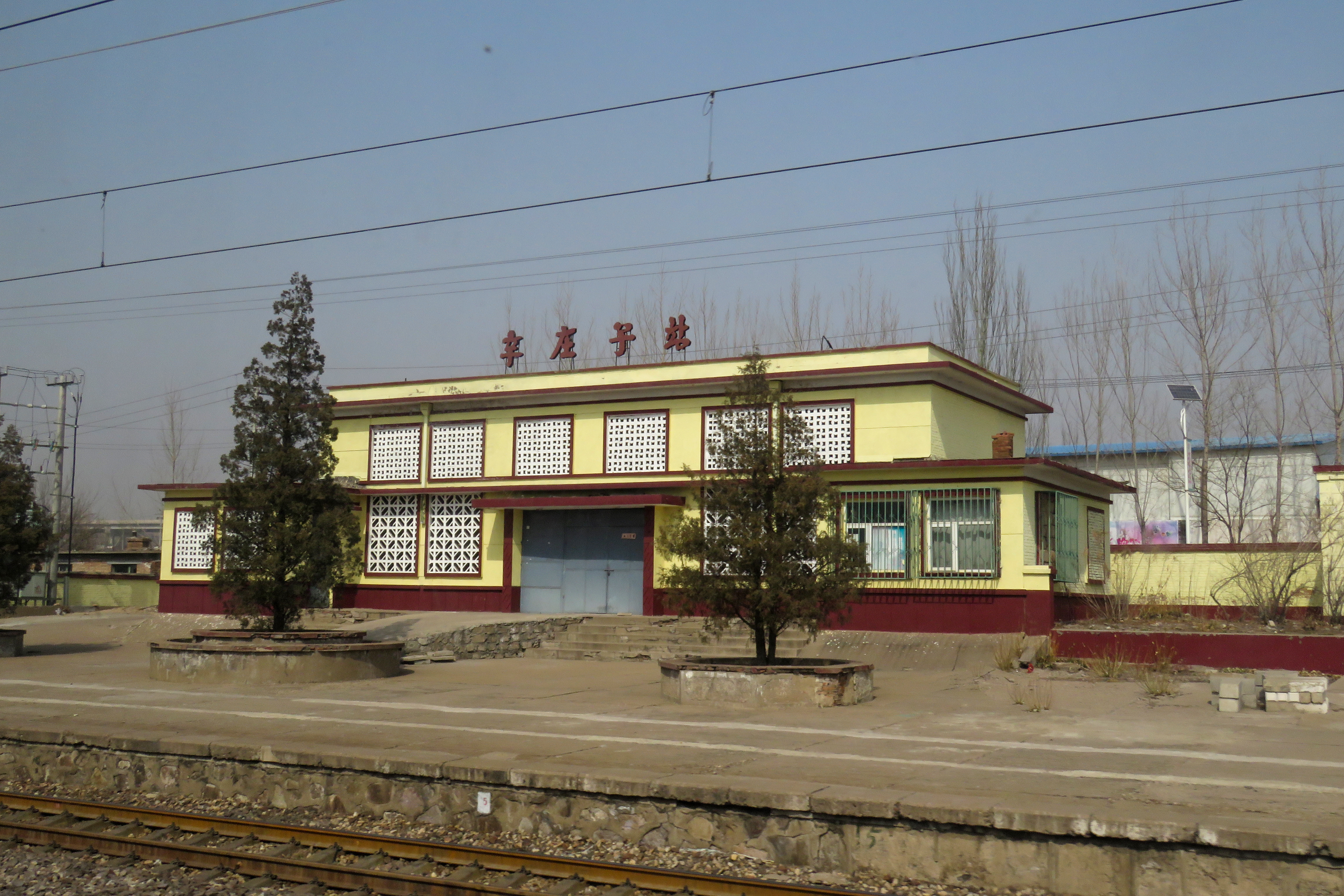

General information
- Location: Xiahuayuan District, Zhangjiakou, Hebei; China
- Line: Beijing-Baotou railway

Other information
- Station code: KJP

History
- Opened: 1909
Location

Xinzhuangzi railway station (simplified Chinese: 辛庄子站; traditional Chinese: 辛莊子站; pinyin: Xīnzhuāngzǐ Zhàn) is a railway station on the Beijing–Baotou railway, located in Xinzhuangzi Township, Xiahuayuan District, Zhangjiakou, Hebei.

== See also ==
- List of stations on Jingbao railway
