= Shalingzi railway station =

Railway station in Zhangjiakou, China

Coordinates: 40°40′19″N 114°55′09″E

Shalingzi 沙岭子站
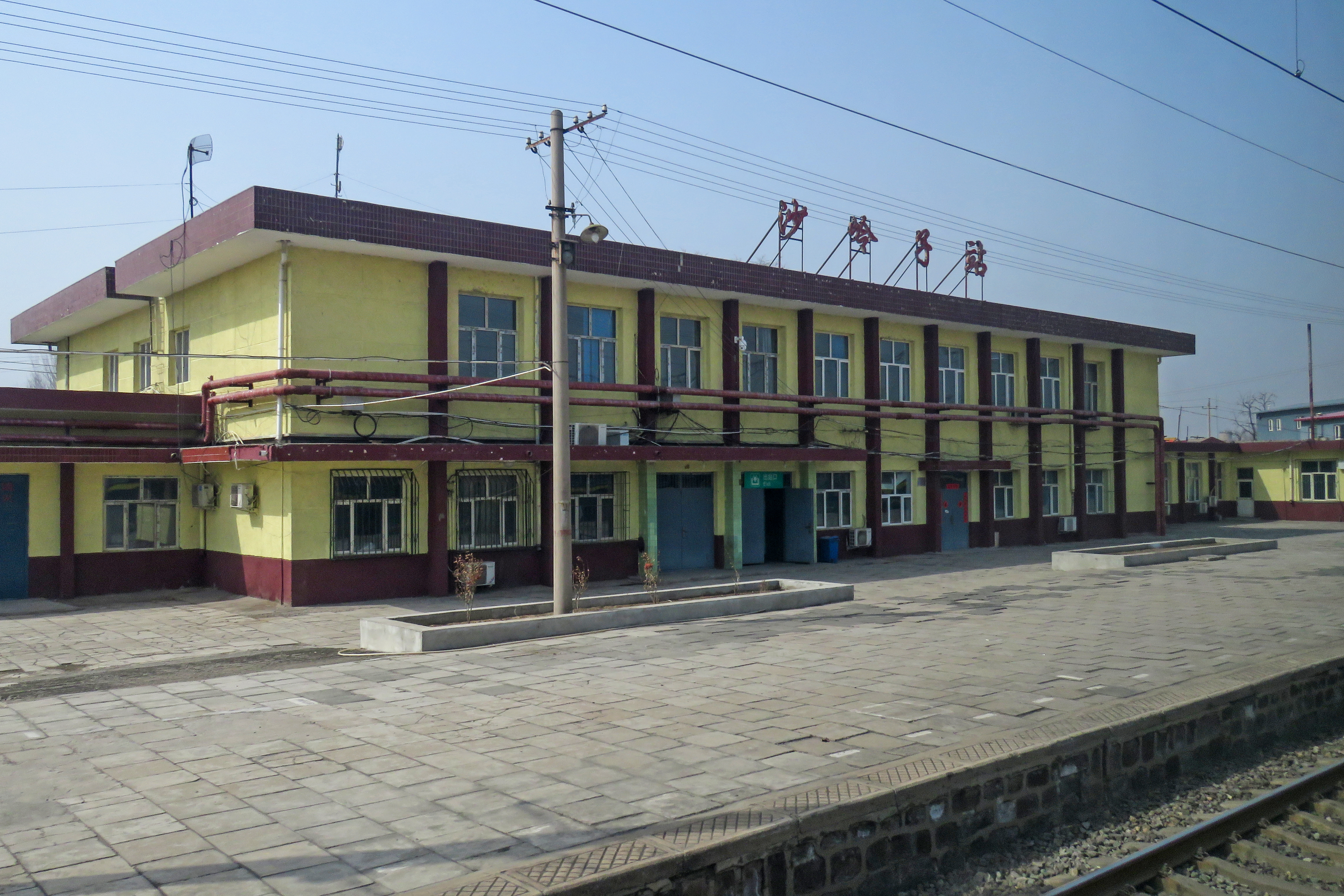

General information
- Location: Qiaoxi District, Zhangjiakou, Hebei; China
- Line: Beijing-Baotou railway

Other information
- Station code: SLP
Location

Shalingzi railway station is a station of Jingbao Railway. It is located in Qiaoxi District, Zhangjiakou, Hebei.

== See also ==
- List of stations on Jingbao railway
