= Xinbao'an railway station =

Railway station in Hebei, China

Coordinates: 40°26′25″N 115°25′53″E

Xinbao'an 新保安站
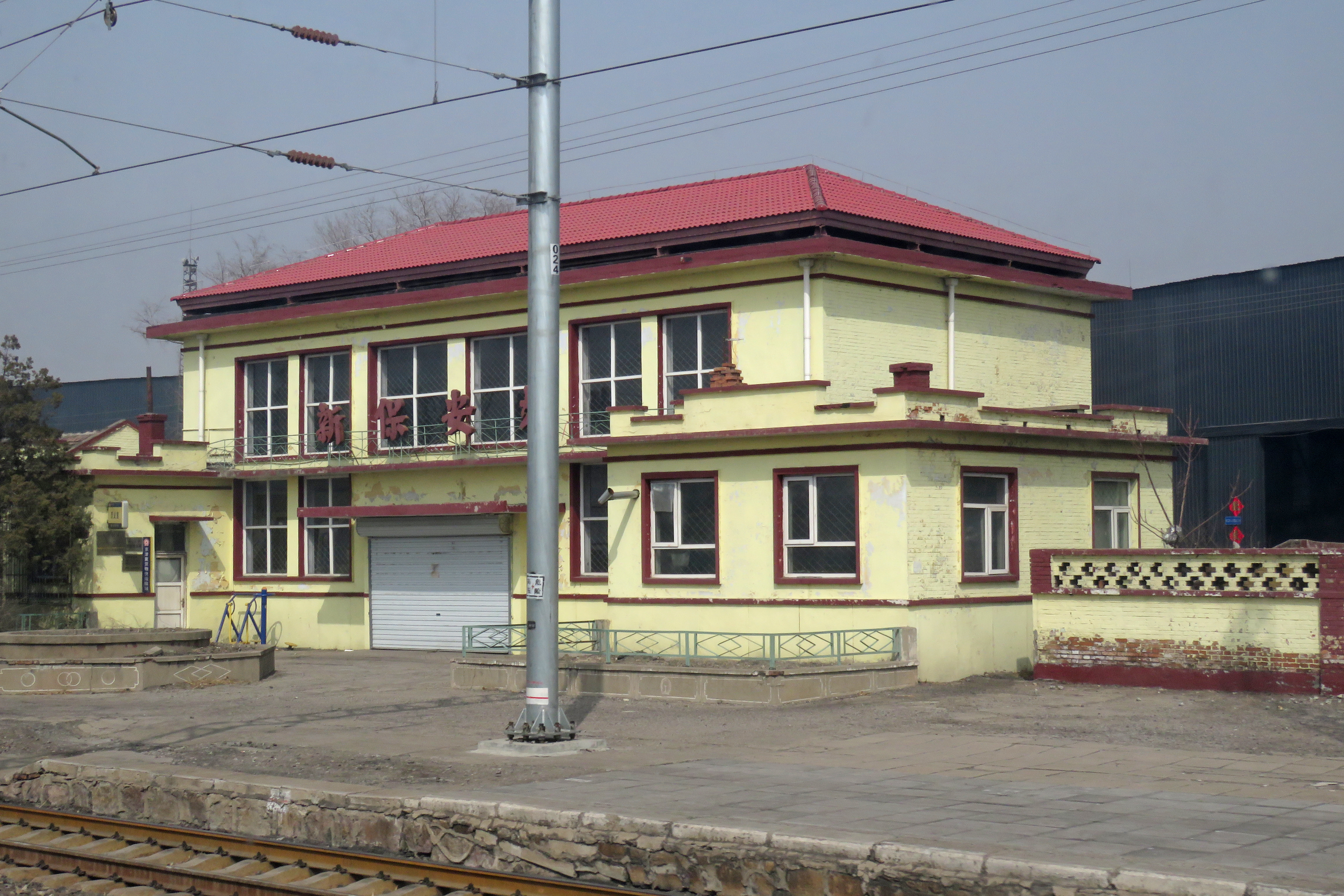

General information
- Location: Huailai County, Zhangjiakou, Hebei; China
- Line: Beijing-Baotou railway

Other information
- Station code: XAP

Xinbao'an railway station (Chinese: 新保安站; pinyin: Xīnbǎo'ān Zhàn) is a station on the Beijing–Baotou railway. It is located in the town of Xinbao'an, Huailai County, Hebei.

== See also ==
List of stations on Jingbao railway
