= Baotou East railway station =

Railway station in Inner Mongolia, China

Coordinates: 40.56898°N 110.01881°E

Baotoudong 包头东站
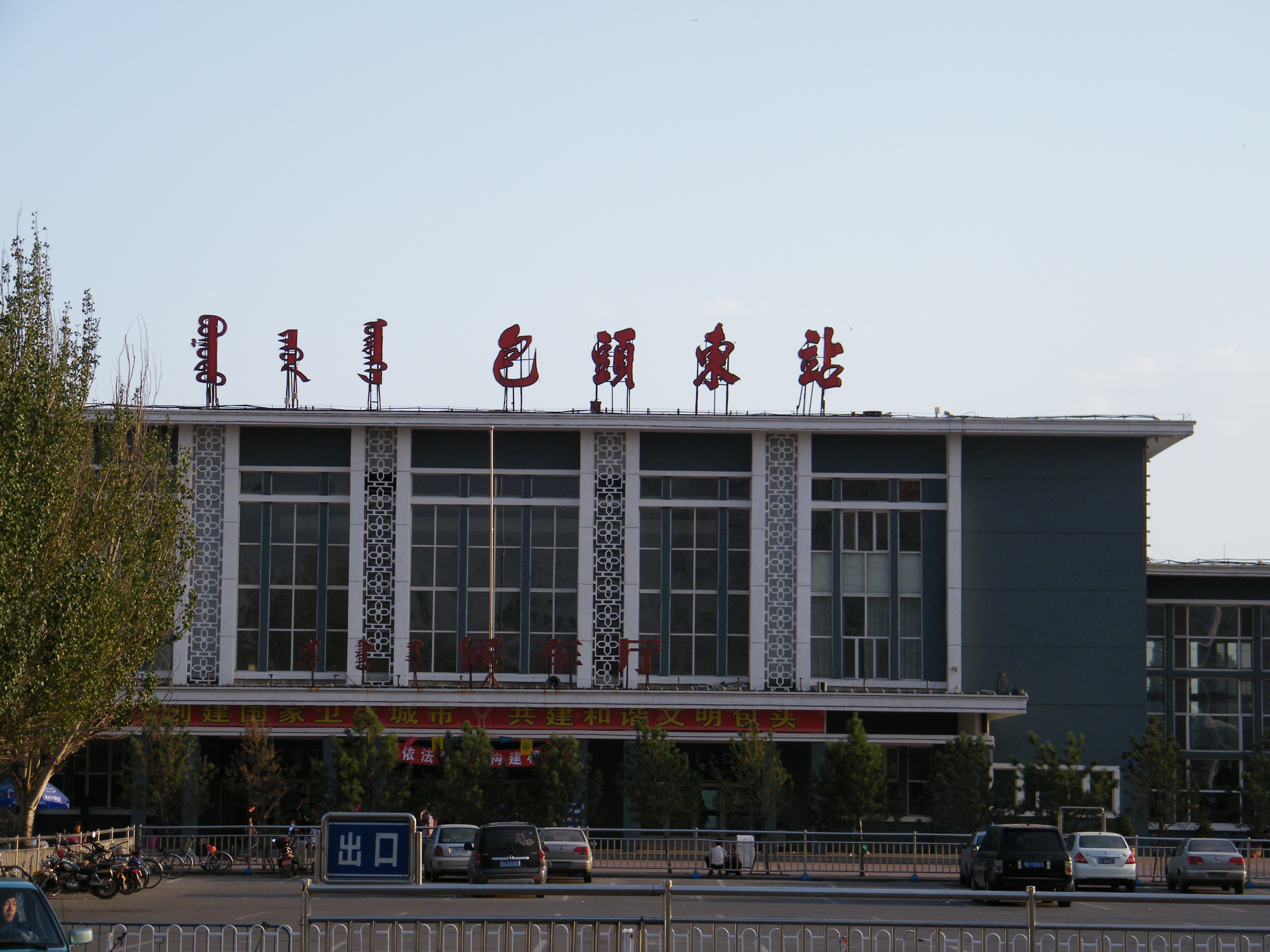

General information
- Location: Donghe District, Baotou, Inner Mongolia; China
- Operator: CR Hohhot
- Line: Beijing-Baotou railway

Other information
- Station code: BDC

History
- Opened: 1923
Location

Baotou East railway station is a station of Jingbao Railway in Inner Mongolia. It was built in 1923 and was at one time the main railway station in Baotou. In 1956, the station was renamed "Baotou East".

== See also ==
- List of stations on Jingbao railway
