= Basumu railway station =

Railway station in Basumu, China

Coordinates: 40.9529°N 112.8485°E

Basumu railway station (Chinese: 八苏木站) is a station of Jingbao Railway in Inner Mongolia. It was built in 1923.

== See also ==
- List of stations on Jingbao railway
