= Hongshaba railway station =

Railway station in China

Hongshaba railway station is a station of Jingbao Railway in Inner Mongolia.

== See also ==
- List of stations on Jingbao railway
