= Gudian railway station =

Railway station in Datong, China

Gudian station (古店站) is a railway station of Jingbao Railway. It is located in the northeastern part of Datong City, Shanxi. The original station was built in 1915.

== See also ==
- List of stations on Jingbao railway
