= Mengguying railway station =

Railway station in Inner Mongolia, China

Mengguying railway station (Chinese: 蒙古营站) is a station of Jingbao Railway. It is located in Inner Mongolia.

== See also ==
- List of stations on Jingbao railway
