= Youyouban railway station =

Railway station in Inner Mongolia

Youyouban station (攸攸板站) is a railway station of Jingbao Railway. It is located in Inner Mongolia.

== See also ==
- List of stations on Jingbao railway
