= Tumu railway station =

Railway station in Hebei, China

Coordinates: 40°21′57″N 115°35′33″E

Tumu 土木站
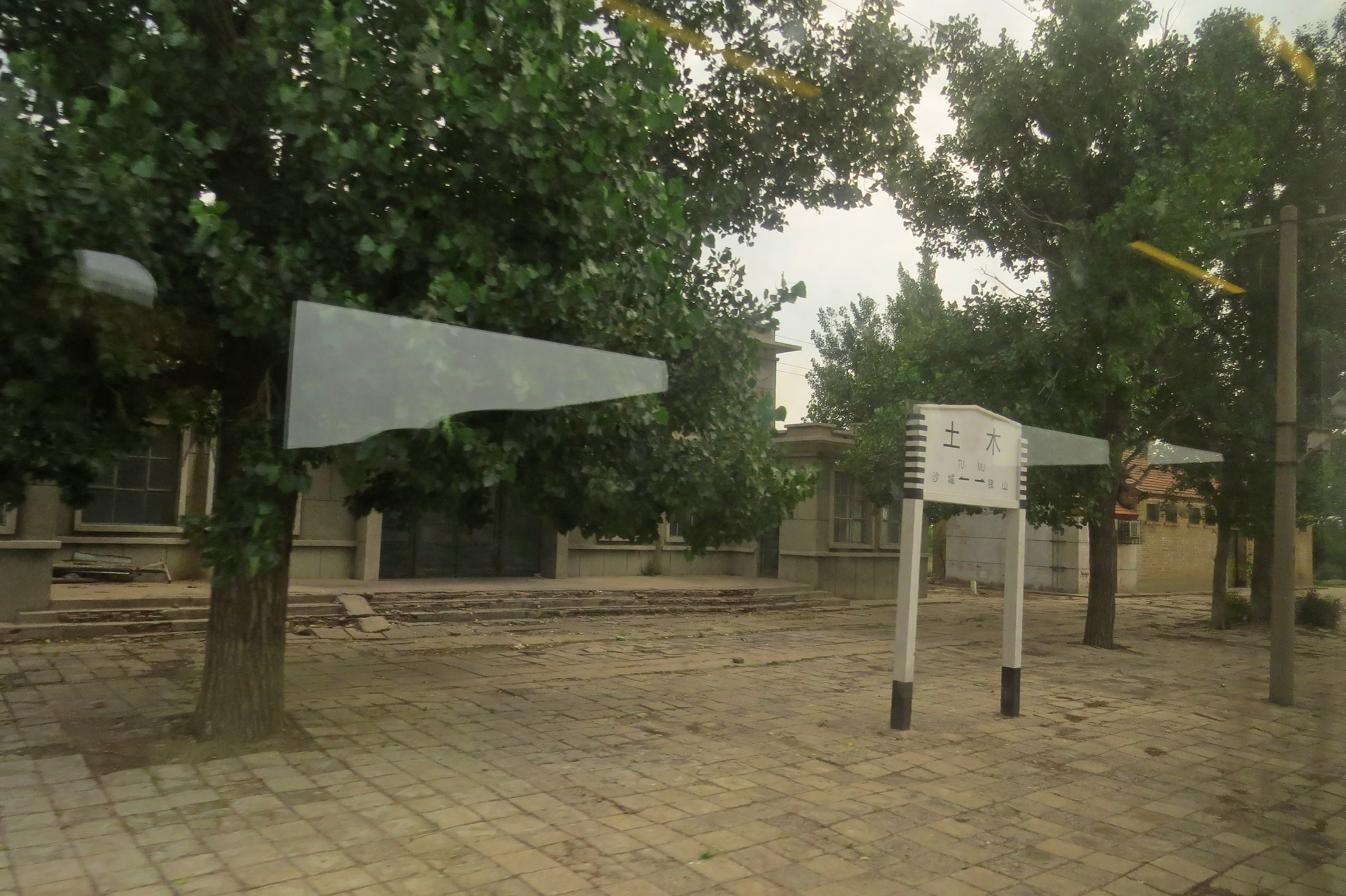

General information
- Location: Huailai County, Zhangjiakou, Hebei; China
- Line: Beijing-Baotou railway

Tumu railway station (Chinese: 土木站; pinyin: Tǔmù Zhàn) is a station on the Beijing–Baotou railway. It is located in Tumu Township, Huailai County, Hebei.

== See also ==
- List of stations on Jingbao railway
