= Taobuqi railway station =

Railway station in Inner Mongolia, China

Coordinates: 40.8803°N 112.0283°E

Taobuqi railway station (Chinese: 陶ト齐站) is a station of Jingbao Railway. It is located in Inner Mongolia.

== See also ==
- List of stations on Jingbao railway
