= Julebao railway station =

Railway station in Datong, China

Julebao railway station is a station of Jingbao Railway. It is located in Datong City, Shanxi.

== See also ==
- List of stations on Jingbao railway
