= Hulu railway station =

Railway station in Inner Mongolia

Coordinates: 41.0428°N 113.0109°E

Hulu railway station is a station of Jingbao Railway. It is located in Inner Mongolia.

== See also ==
- List of stations on Jingbao railway
