= Taosihao railway station =

Railway station in Inner Mongolia, China

Coordinates: 40.6584°N 110.9309°E

Taosihao railway station is a station of Jingbao Railway. It is located in Inner Mongolia.

== See also ==
- List of stations on Jingbao railway
