= Shibatai railway station =

Railway station in China

Coordinates: 40.9048°N 112.8166°E

Shibatai 十八台站

General information
- Location: Zhuozi County, Ulanqab, Inner Mongolia; China
- Operated by: China Railway Hohhot Group
- Line: Beijing–Baotou railway

Other information
- Station code: 7050104
Location

Shibatai railway station (Chinese: 十八台站) is a railway station on the Beijing–Baotou railway (also known as the Jingbao Railway), located in Zhuozi County, Ulanqab, Inner Mongolia, China. The station is operated by the China Railway Hohhot Group and has the code 7050104.

The Beijing-Baotou railway is an 833 km line linking Beijing and Baotou, used for both freight and passenger services in northern China, jointly managed by the Beijing and Hohhot railway groups.

== See also ==
- List of stations on Jingbao railway
- Beijing–Baotou railway
