= Fengzhen railway station =

Railway station in Fengzhen, China

Coordinates: 40.4349°N 113.1633°E

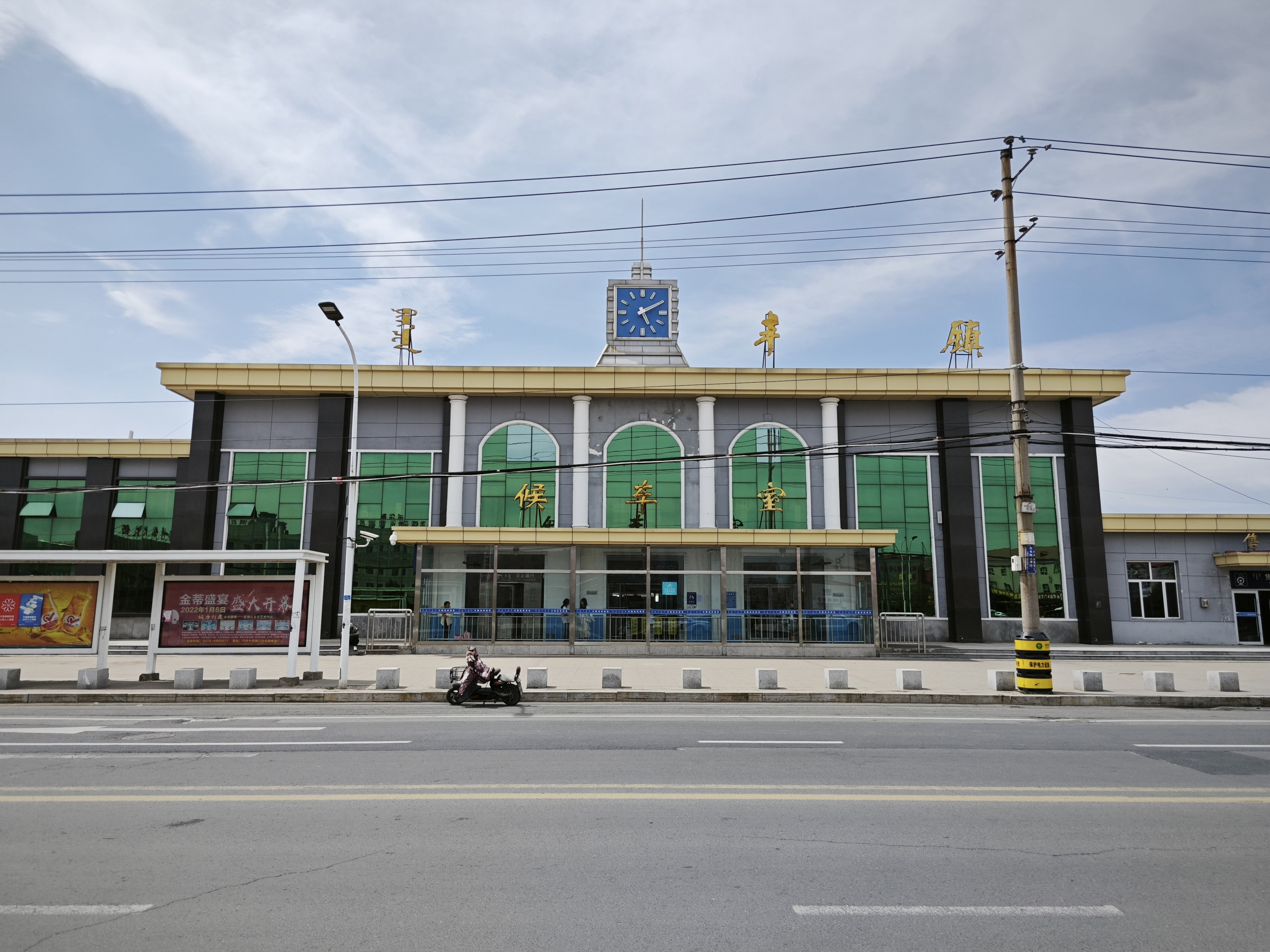
Fengzhen railway station

Fengzhen railway station is a station on the Jingbao Railway. It is located in Fengzhen, Inner Mongolia, China.

== See also ==
- List of stations on Jingbao railway
