= Guoleizhuang railway station =

Railway station in Hebei, China

Coordinates: 40.7189°N 114.5447°E

Guoleizhuang railway station is a station of Jingbao Railway in Hebei.

== See also ==
- List of stations on Jingbao railway
