= Minzu railway station (Inner Mongolia) =

Railway station in Inner Mongolia, China

Minzu railway station 民族站

General information
- Coordinates: 40.8957°N 112.0989°E
- Owner: Jingbao Railway
Location

Minzu railway station is a minor station of the Beijing–Baotou railway, also called Jingbao Railway, in Inner Mongolia autonomous region, in North China. This station is located in Minzu village, Hohhot city, Saihan district, Inner Mongolia with postal code 010073. It is a fifth-class station which comes under China Railway Hohhot Group company limited and was built in 1989 on the Tangbao Railway.

It is 628 kilometers (390 mi) from Beijing Station and 204 kilometers (127 mi) from Baotou station. It is 11 kilometers (6.8 mi) from the upstream station Qixiaying Station and eight kilometers (5.0 mi) from the downstream station Taobuqi Station. The station belongs to the Jining Railway Section of China Railway Hohhot Group.

As part of the 2022 Olympic Winter Games project, according to the Baotou Daily, a Fuxing bullet train from the Baotou Railway Station in Baotou started running after full line test runs on 23 Dec 2020 which completed the new high-speed railway line that links Baotou with Beijing. This high-speed passes through Zhangjiakou in Hebei province and Ulaanqab and Hohhot in Inner Mongolia autonomous region. The east Ulaanqab-Hohhot section of the Zhangjiakou-Hohhot Railway launched in August 2017 was completed in June 2019.

== See also ==
- List of stations on Jingbao railway
