= Shalingzi East railway station =

Railway station in Hebei, China

Coordinates: 40°39′03″N 114°57′08″E

Shalingzi East railway station is a station of Jingbao Railway in Hebei.

== See also ==
- List of stations on Jingbao railway
