= Suji railway station =

Railway station in Inner Mongolia, China

Suji 苏集

General information
- Location: Chahar Right Front Banner (察哈尔右翼前旗) District, Ulanqab, Inner Mongolia; China
- Coordinates: 40°54′0″N 113°6′51″E
- Operated by: Hohhot Railway Bureau, China Railway Corporation
- Line: Jingbao Railway

History
- Opened: 1922
Location

Suji railway station (simplified Chinese: 苏集站; traditional Chinese: 蘇集站; pinyin: Sū Jí Zhàn) is a station of Jingbao Railway. It is located in Inner Mongolia.

== See also ==
- List of stations on Jingbao railway
