= Xiwanbu railway station =

Railway station in Hebei, China

Coordinates: 40.5736°N 114.3550°E

Xiwanbao railway station is a station of Jingbao Railway in Hebei.

== See also ==
- List of stations on Jingbao railway
