= Magaitu railway station =

Railway station in China

Magaitu railway station (馬蓋圖站)
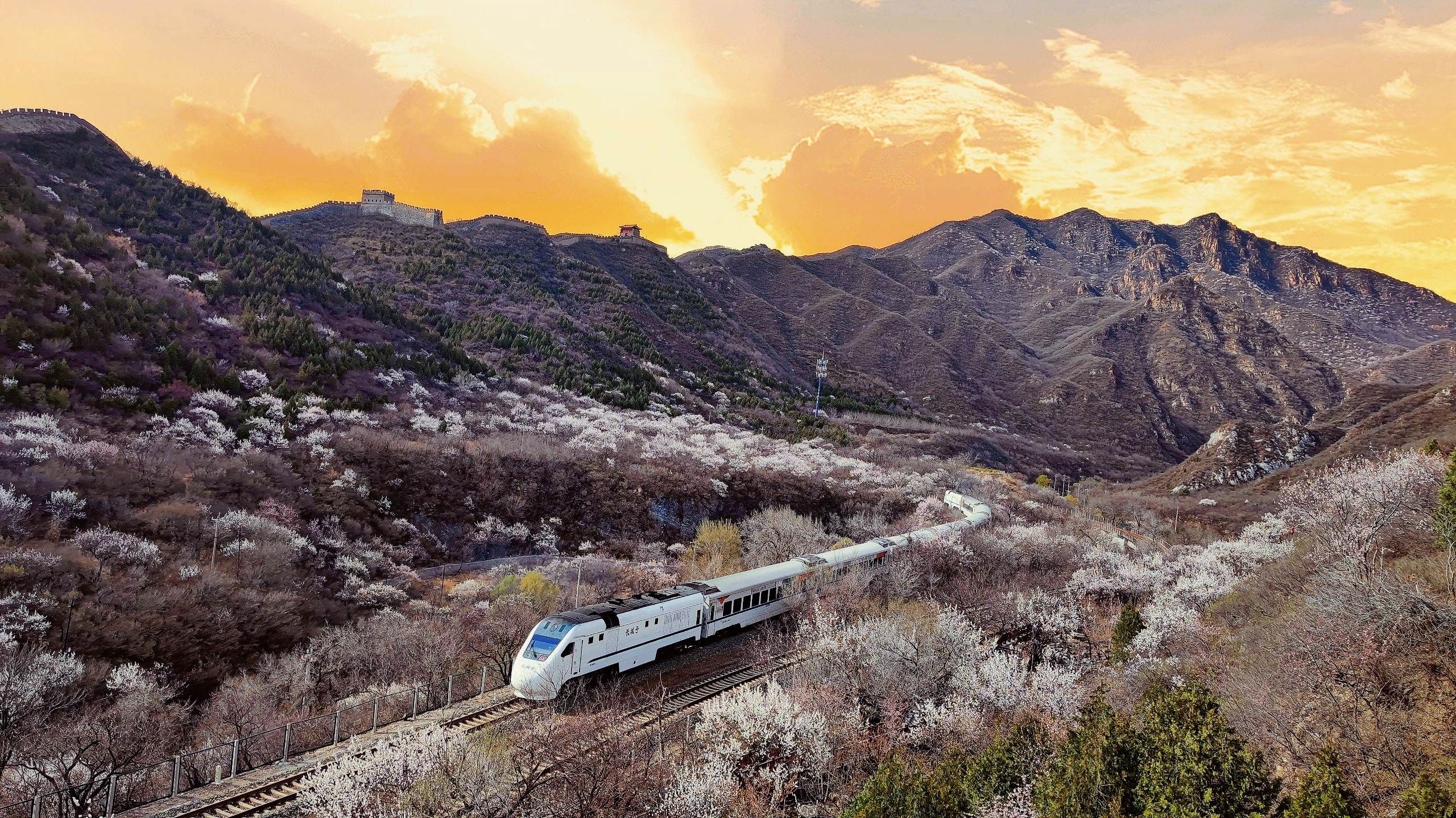
- The Beijing–Baotou railway

Magaitu railway station (Chinese: 馬蓋圖站) is a station of Jingbao Railway in Inner Mongolia.

== Geography ==
The station is located in Magaitu Township, Zhuozi County, Inner Mongolia Autonomous Region, with the postal code 012305. It was built in 1923. The distance to Beijing Station is 561 kilometers, and to Baotou Station is 271 kilometers. It is under the jurisdiction of the Hohhot Railway Bureau and is currently a Class 4 station.

== Services ==
Passenger services: It handles passenger boarding and alighting, as well as luggage and parcel shipping.

Freight services: It processes the delivery of full truckload goods but does not handle the delivery of tanked hazardous goods.

== See also ==
- List of stations on Jingbao railway
