= Sandaoying railway station =

Railway station in Inner Mongolia, China

Coordinates: 40.9926°N 112.2960°E

Sandaoying railway station (Chinese: 三道营站; pinyin: Sān dào yíng zhàn) is a station of Jingbao Railway in Sandaoying Township (三道营乡), Zhuozi County, Inner Mongolia, China. Built in 1922, the station is 604 kilometres (375 mi) from Beijing railway station and 228 kilometres (142 mi) from Baotou railway station. It is under the jurisdiction of the Jining Railway Branch (局集宁铁路分) of the China Railway Hohhot Group and is a fourth-class station.

== See also ==
- List of stations on Jingbao railway
