= Guojiaying railway station =

Railway station in China

Guojiaying railway station (Chinese: 郭家营站) is a station of Jingbao Railway in Inner Mongolia. The station is located in Hohhot, Saihan District, and was built in 1989.

== See also ==
- List of stations on Jingbao railway
