= Chasuqi railway station =

Railway station in Inner Mongolia, China

Coordinates: 40.7049°N 111.1259°E

Chasuqi railway station (察素齐站) is a station of Jingbao Railway in Inner Mongolia. It is located in Tumed Left Banner in Hohhot City. It was built in 1923 and handles freight.

== See also ==
- List of stations on Jingbao railway
