= Guchengwan railway station =

Railway station in Inner Mongolia, China

Coordinates: 40.5522°N 110.1050°E

Guchengwan railway station is a station of Jingbao Railway. It is located in Inner Mongolia.

== See also ==
- List of stations on Jingbao railway
