= Laozang railway station =

Railway station in Mongolia

Laozang railway station is a station of Jingbao Railway. It is located in Inner Mongolia.

== See also ==
- List of stations on Jingbao railway
