= Songla railway station =

Railway station in Inner Mongolia, China

Songla railway station is a station of Beijing–Baotou railway. It is located in Inner Mongolia.

== See also ==
- List of stations on Jingbao railway
