= Beijing–Baotou railway =

Rail line from China's capital to Inner Mongolia

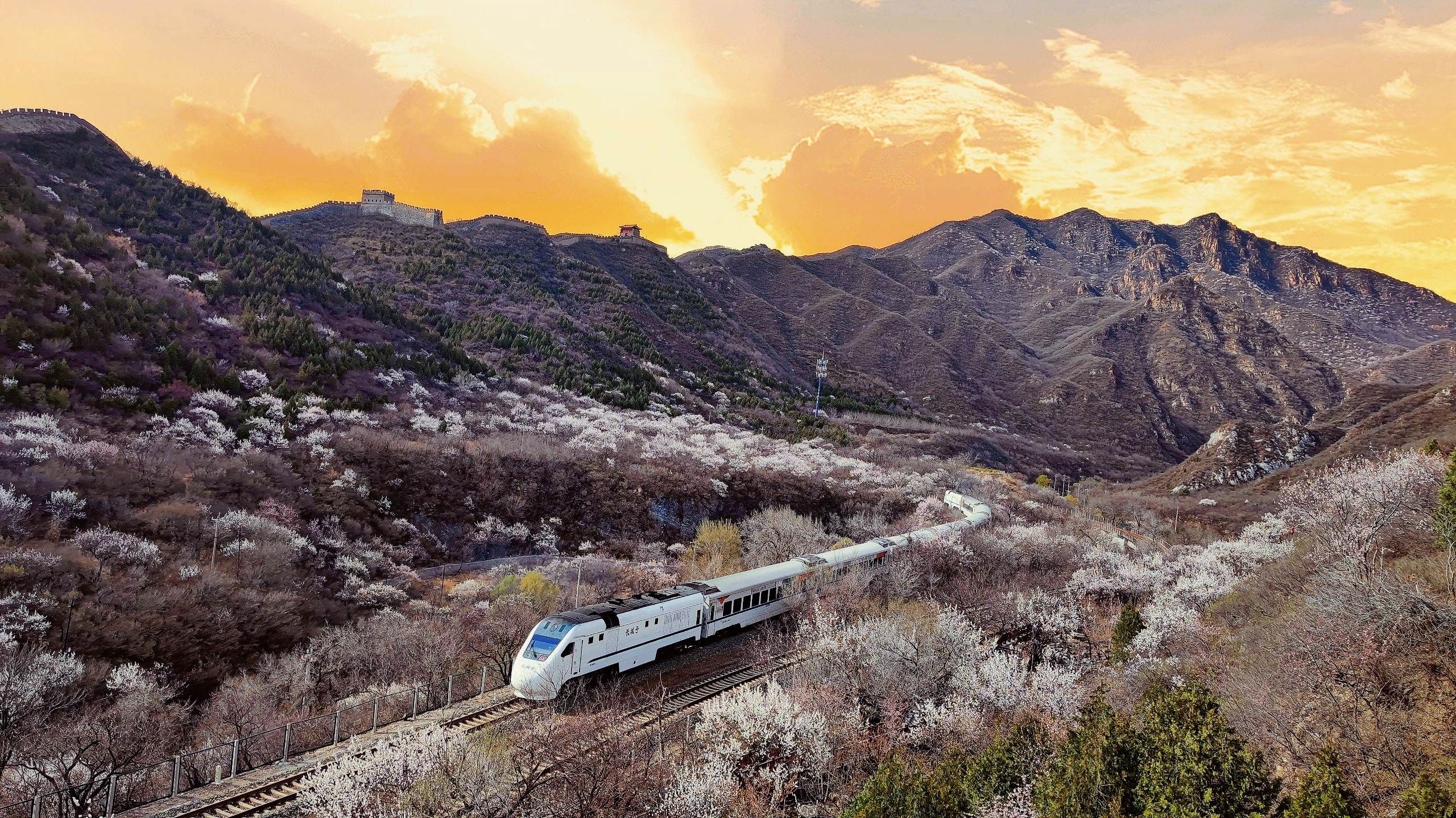
- Aerial view of the NDJ3 DMU trainset along the Beijing–Baotou railway

Overview
- Other name: Jingbao railway
- Status: Operational
- Owner: China Railway
- Locale: North China
- Termini: Beijing North (nominal); Changping (actual); Baotou
- Stations: 89

Service
- Type: Regional rail; Inter-city rail; Commuter rail; Freight rail
- System: China Railway; Beijing Suburban Railway (S2)
- Operators: China Railway Beijing Group; China Railway Hohhot Group

History
- Work began: Between 1905–1909; 117 years ago
- Opened: 24 September 1909; 116 years ago

Technical
- Line length: 834 km (518 mi)
- Number of tracks: 2
- Track gauge: 1,435 mm (4 ft 8 1/2 in) standard gauge
- Electrification: Overhead catenary with AC 25 kV 50 Hz (except Changping–Shacheng)
- Operating speed: 100 km/h (62 mph)

The Beijing–Baotou railway or Jingbao railway (simplified Chinese: 京包铁路; traditional Chinese: 京包鐵路; pinyin: Jīngbāo Tiělù) is an 833 km (518 mi) railway from Beijing to Baotou, Inner Mongolia, functioning as an important route in North China. It was the first railway in China designed and built by Chinese. It passes through a famous section of the Great Wall at Badaling. It is now largely paralleled with Beijing–Zhangjiakou intercity railway and Zhangjiakou–Hohhot high-speed railway.

In 2019, with the opening of the Beijing–Zhangjiakou intercity railway, the Beijing–Baotou railway adjusted the mileage. The ordinary-speed line from Changping to Shahe was merged into the Shuangqiao–Shahe Railway (Beijing Northeast Ring railway). The actual starting point of the Beijing–Baotou railway was shortened to the south side of Changping, the section from Changping to Beijing North is considered part of Beijing–Zhangjiakou intercity railway.

== History ==
The first section of the Beijing–Baotou railway, the Imperial Peking–Kalgan railway (now the "Jingzhang" railway) was constructed between 1905 and 1909, connecting Beijing with Zhangjiakou (Kalgan). This section was the first railway designed and built by Chinese. The chief engineer is Zhan Tianyou. He overcame the steep gradient near Badaling using a switchback. Due to his achievement in constructing this railway, Zhan (Jeme) is called the father of China's railways.

The railway was extended from Zhangjiakou to Hohhot by 1921 and to Baotou by 1923.

Even with the switchback, the gradient near Qinglongqiao railway station is still at 3.3%. In addition, travelling through the switchback is slow. A bypass route, the Fensha railway, was built in the 1950s between Fengtai and Shacheng along the Yongding river. This route was considered but dropped by Zhan due to high construction cost. Before the 1990s, the Fengsha railway was mainly used to transport freight, and the original Jingzhang railway was focused on passenger transport. Now, trains to/from Baotou have changed to use the Fengsha railway instead.

The Beijing–Zhangjiakou intercity railway and the Zhangjiakou–Hohhot high-speed railway, which both opened on 30 December 2019, parallel most of the line.

To improve the freight capacity of Tangshan–Hohhot railway, those two railway lines exchange their main line between Hulu railway station and Taobuqi railway station in September 2020, separating the freight and passenger corridors. Meanwhile the section between Taigemu railway station and Baotou railway station was also assigned to Tangshan–Hohhot railway which has been renamed as Tangshan–Baotou railway.

== Current operations ==
The main route that deviates via the Fengsha railway is a double-track, electrified line. The section between Jining South and Baotou is quadruple track. The section between Changping and Shacheng is not electrified and mainly single-track. It is now used by little traffic. Freight and long-distance passenger services run via the Fengsha railway. 13 express services run each way between Beijing and Baotou each day, taking approximately 11 hours, stopping in Xuanhua, Zhangjiakou, Datong, Jining South, Hohhot and Baotou.

=== Line S2 ===
Line S2 services of the Beijing Suburban Railway between Huangtudian (running via the Beijing Northeast Ring railway and connecting to the Jingbao railway between Qinghe and Shahe) and Badaling (the station for visiting the Great Wall) continue to use the Jingbao Railway, reversing at Qinglongqiao West station on the western switchback on the journey towards Badaling and at Qinglongqiao main station on the eastern switchback on their way back towards Beijing. The stops at Qinglongqiao are service stops, not advertised passenger stops and the doors remain closed.

From 2008 to 2016, the S2 services operated hourly from Beijing North to Yanqing and Shacheng. From 2016 to 2019, the S2 services operated hourly from Huangtudian to Yanqing and Shacheng. Since 1 December 2020 there have been five services between Huangtudian and Yanqing each way from Friday to Monday and on public holidays. On other days there are three services. These services are the only regular traffic on the unelectrified line east of Shacheng and are operated using diesel multiple units. S2 services continue from Badaling over the short single-track Kangzhuang–Yanqing railway (Kangyan railway) to Yanqing. The Kangzhuang–Yanqing railway was temporarily closed between March 30, 2020 and June 30, 2020.

== Stations and mileage ==
Some of the following stations are now disused.

- Beijing North (北京北)
- Qinghuayuan (清华园) (Closed)
- Qinghe (清河)
  - Beijing (北京) (via Beijing Northeast Ring railway)
- Shahe (沙河) (above routes belong to Beijing–Zhangjiakou intercity railway)
- Changping (昌平)
- Nankou (南口)
- Dongyuan (东园)
- Juyongguan (居庸关)
- Sanpu (三堡)
- Qinglongqiao (青龙桥)
- Qinglongqiao West (青龙桥西)
- Badaling (八达岭)
- Xibozi (西拨子)
- Kangzhuang (康庄)
- Donghuayuan (东花园)
- Tumu (土木)
- Shacheng (沙城)
- Xinbao'an (新保安)
- Xibali (西八里)
- Xiahuayuan (下花园)
- Xinzhuangzi (辛庄子)
- Xuanhua (宣化)
- Shalingzi east (沙岭子东)
- Shalingzi (沙岭子)
- Zhangjiakou (张家口)
- Zhangjiakou South (张家口南)
- Zhangjiakou (张家口)(old)
- Kongjiazhuang (孔家庄)
- Wangyuzhuang (王玉庄)
- Guoleizhuang (郭磊庄)
- Chaigoubu (柴沟堡)
- Xiwanbu (西湾堡)
- Yongjiabao (永嘉堡)
- Xiaxiaobao (夏小堡)
- Tianzhen (天镇)
- Luowenzao (罗文皂)
- Yanggao (阳高)
- Wangguanrentun (王官人屯)
- Julebao (聚乐堡)
- Zhoushizhuang (周士庄)
- Datong east (大同东)
- Datong (大同)
- Gudian (古店)
- Gushan (孤山站)
- Baoziwan (堡子湾站)
- Wutaiwa (五台洼站)
- Fengzhen (丰镇站)
- Jiandi (监地站)
- Xin'anzhuang (新安庄站)
- Yongwangzhuang (永王庄站)
- Hongshaba (红砂坝站)
- Suojiacun (索家村站)
- Tuguiwula (土贵乌拉站)
- Naji (纳继站)
- Suji (苏集站)
- Guyingpan (古营盘站)
- Jining south (集宁南站)
- Hulu (葫芦站)
- Sanchakou (三岔口站)
- Basumu (八苏木站)
- Shibatai (十八台站)
- Hala (哈拉站)
- Magaitu (马盖图站)
- Gujiabao (姑家堡站)
- Zhuozishan (卓资山站)
- Fushengzhuang (福生庄站)
- Anju (安居站)
- Sandaoying (三道营站)
- Mengguying (蒙古营站)
- Qixiaying (旗下营站)
- Minzu (民族站)
- Taobuqi (陶卜齐站)
- Guojiaying (郭家营站)
- Baita (白塔站)
- Nandian (南店站)
- Hohhot (呼和浩特站)
- Youyouban (攸攸板站)
- Taigemu (台阁牧站)
- Dalibao (大里堡站)
- Bikeqi (毕克齐站)
- Chasuqi (察素齐站)
- Songla (宋拉站)
- Taosihao (陶思浩站)
- Sanbashu (三八树站)
- Meidaizhao (美岱召站)
- Laozang (老藏站)
- Salaqi (萨拉齐站)
- Gongjiban (公积坂站)
- Dongxing (东兴站)
- Guchengwan (古城湾站)
- Baotou east (包头东站)
- Wanshuiquan (万水泉站)
- Baotou (包头站)

| Major Station | Mileage (km) |
|---|---|
| Beijing (北京) | 0 |
| Shacheng (沙城) | 121 |
| Xuanhua (宣化) | 171 |
| Zhangjiakou South (张家口南) | 196 |
| Datong (大同) | 374 |
| Jining south (集宁南) | 501 |
| Hohhot (呼和浩特) | 659 |
| Baotou (包头) | 824 |

== Gallery ==
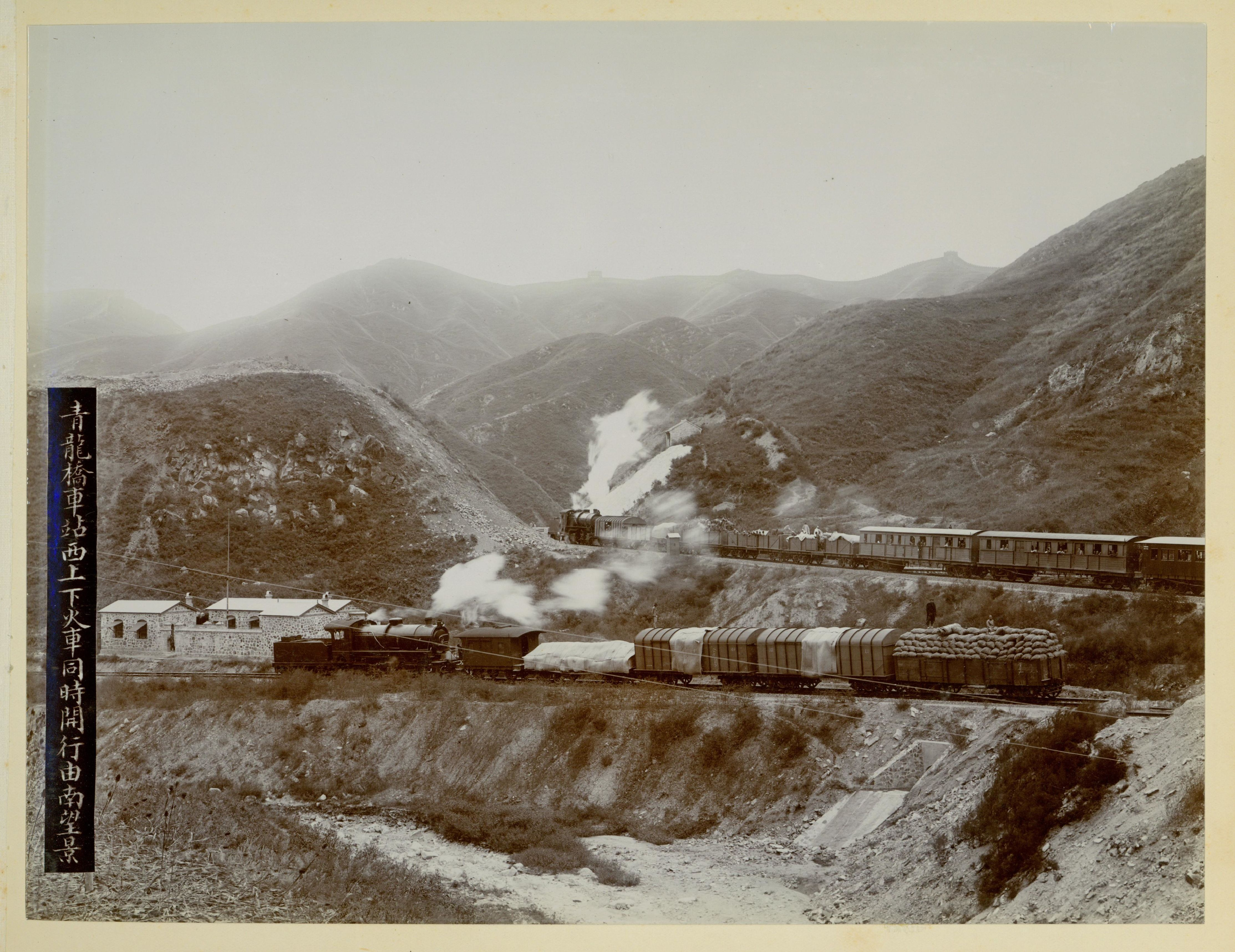
The Qinglongqiao Station in 1908

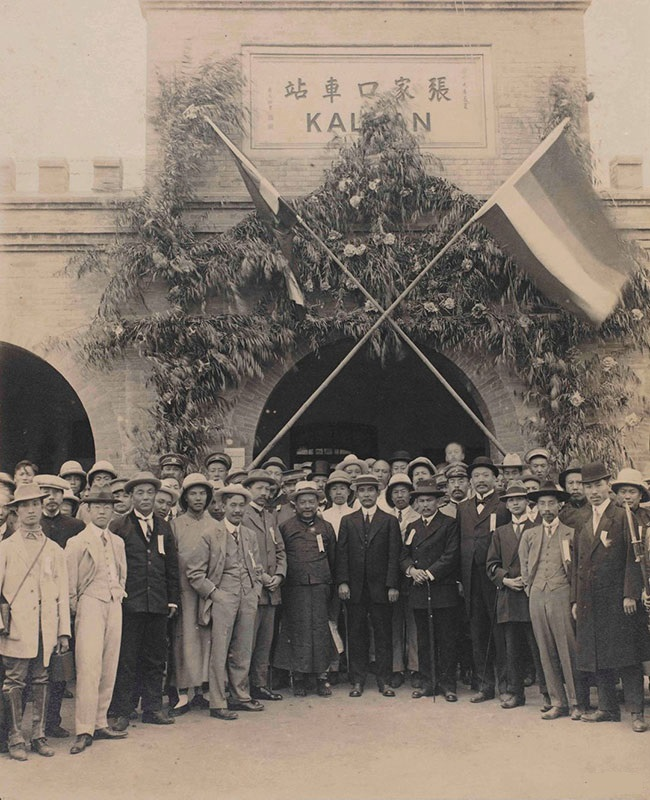
Sun Yat-sen inspecting the Beijing–Zhangjiakou railway at the Zhangjiakou railway station in 1912, shortly after the founding of the Republic of China.

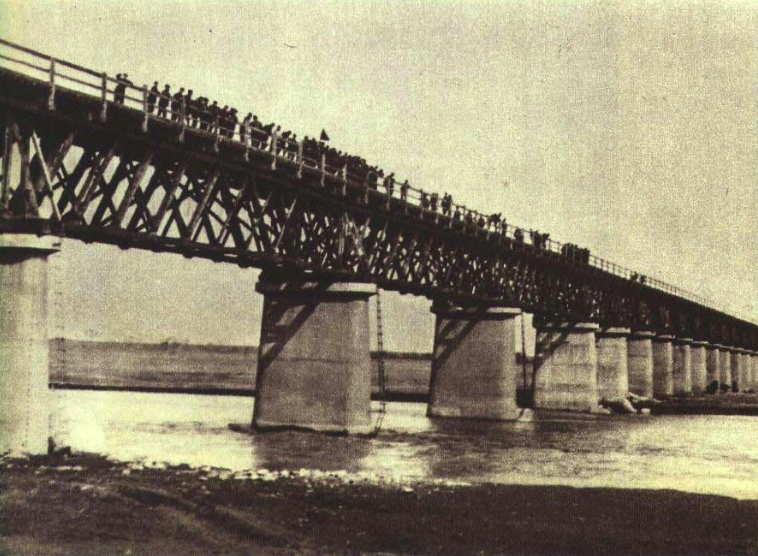
Bridge over the Yongding River in 1952

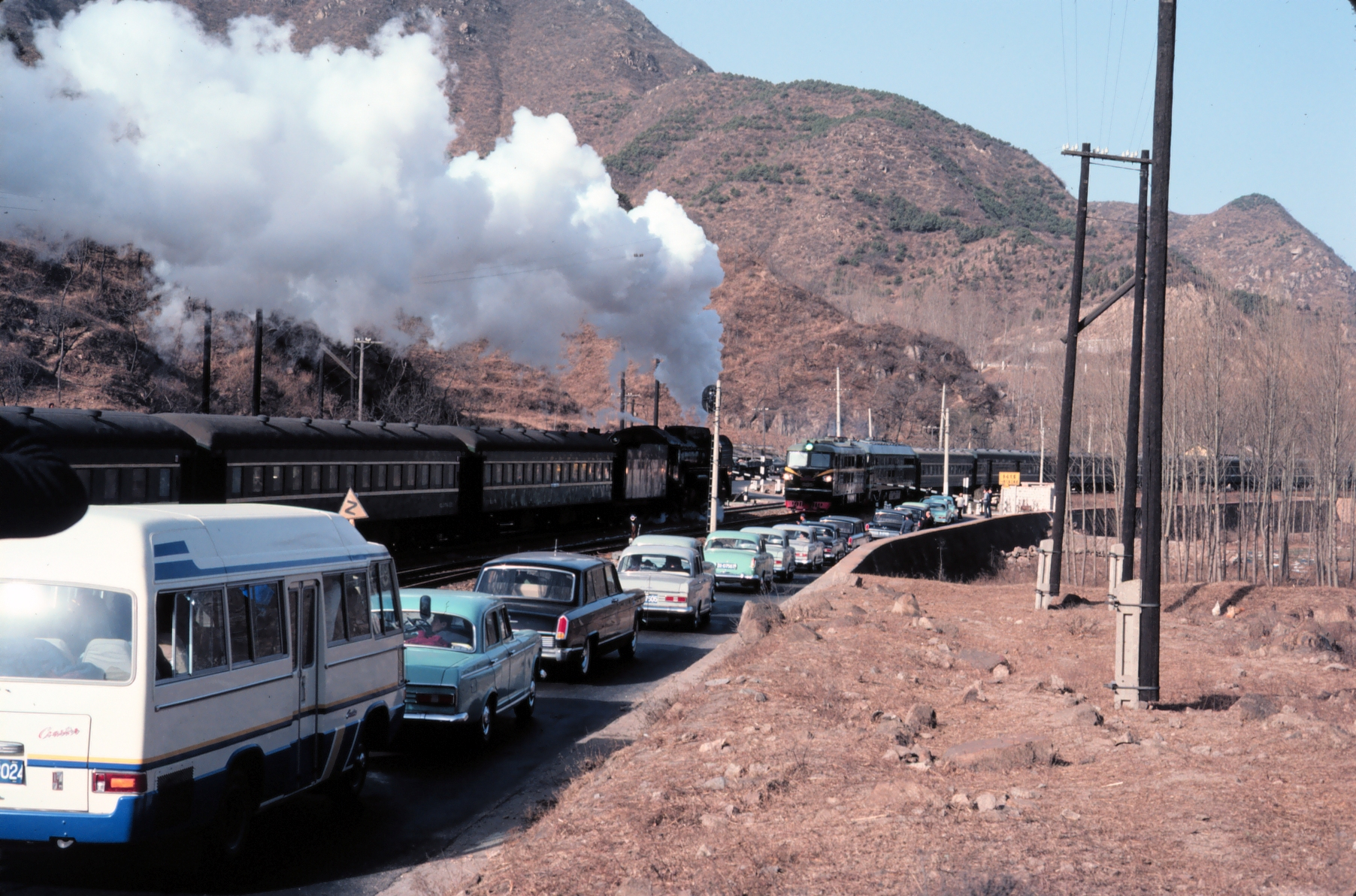
A steam locomotive and a diesel locomotive near Badaling in 1979

== See also ==
- List of railways in China
- Rail transport in Inner Mongolia
- Rail transport in the People's Republic of China
