= Nandian railway station =

Railway station in Inner Mongolia, China

Nandian railway station (南店站) is a station of Jingbao Railway in Inner Mongolia.

== See also ==
- List of stations on Jingbao railway
