= Wangguanrentun railway station =

Railway station in Datong, China

Wangguanrentun railway station (Chinese: 王官人屯站; pinyin: Wángguānréntún Zhàn) is a railway station of Jingbao Railway. It is located in Datong City, Shanxi.

== See also ==
- List of stations on Jingbao railway
