= Sanpu railway station =

Railway station in Beijing, China

Coordinates: 40.3264°N 116.0356°E

Sanpu 三堡站
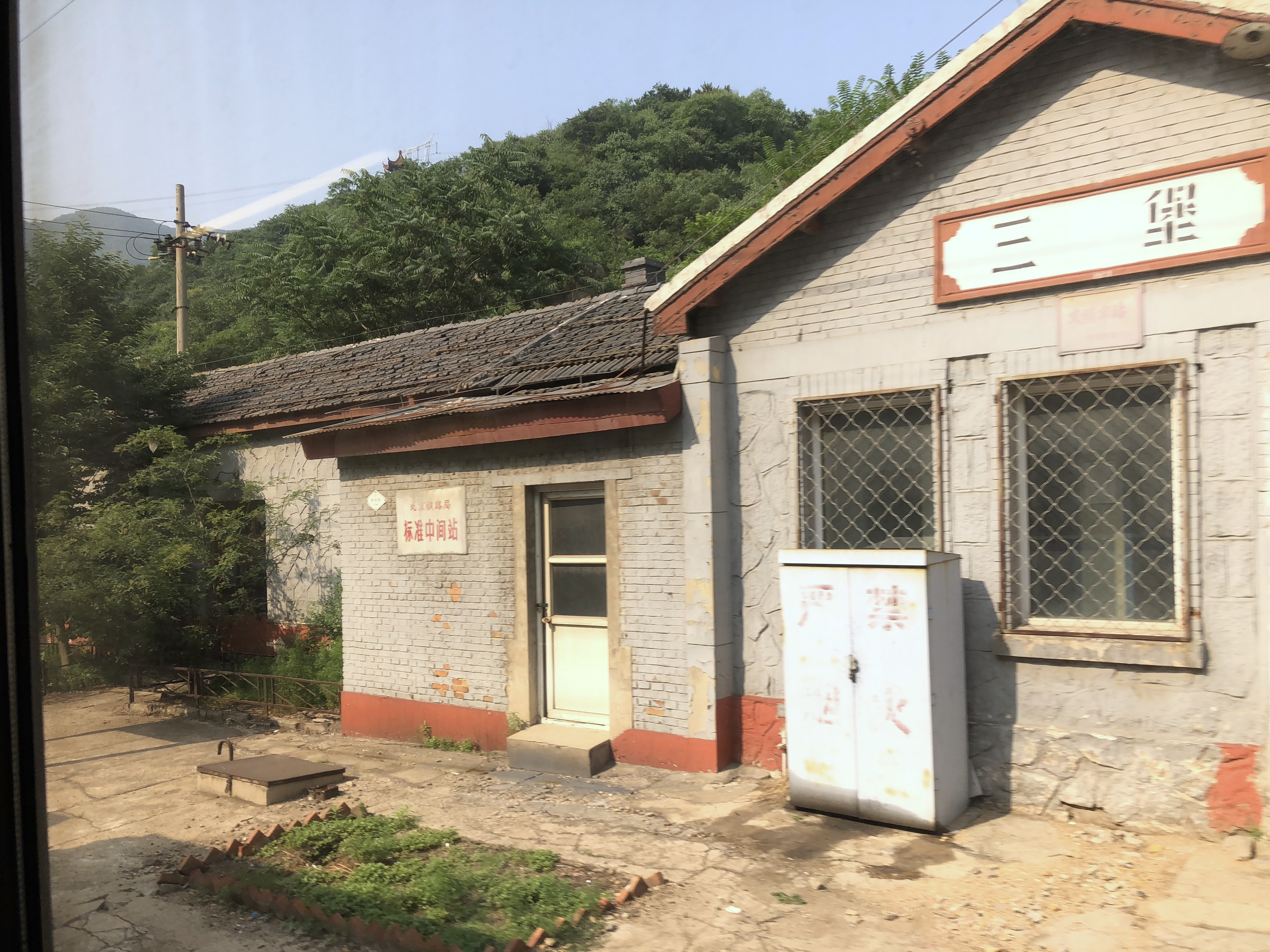

General information
- Location: Yanqing District, Beijing; China
- Line: Beijing-Baotou railway

Sanpu station (Chinese: 三堡站; pinyin: Sānpù Zhàn) is a railway station on the Jingbao Railway line in Beijing.

== Schedule ==
No passenger trains currently stop at this station. Line S2 of the Beijing Suburban Railway passes through this station without stopping.

== See also ==
- List of stations on Jingbao railway
