= Chaigoubu railway station =

Railway station in Chaigoubu, China

Coordinates: 40.6703°N 114.4086°E

Chaigoubu railway station (simplified Chinese: 柴沟堡站; traditional Chinese: 柴溝堡站; pinyin: Cháigōubǔ Zhàn) is a station of Jingbao Railway in Hebei, located in Chaigoubu, Huai'an County, Zhangjiakou, Hebei, China. In recent years, the number of trains stopping at the station during the summer has increased.

== See also ==
- List of stations on Jingbao railway
