= Xibali railway station =

Railway station in Hebei, China

Coordinates: 40°26′20″N 115°20′43″E

Xibali 西八里站
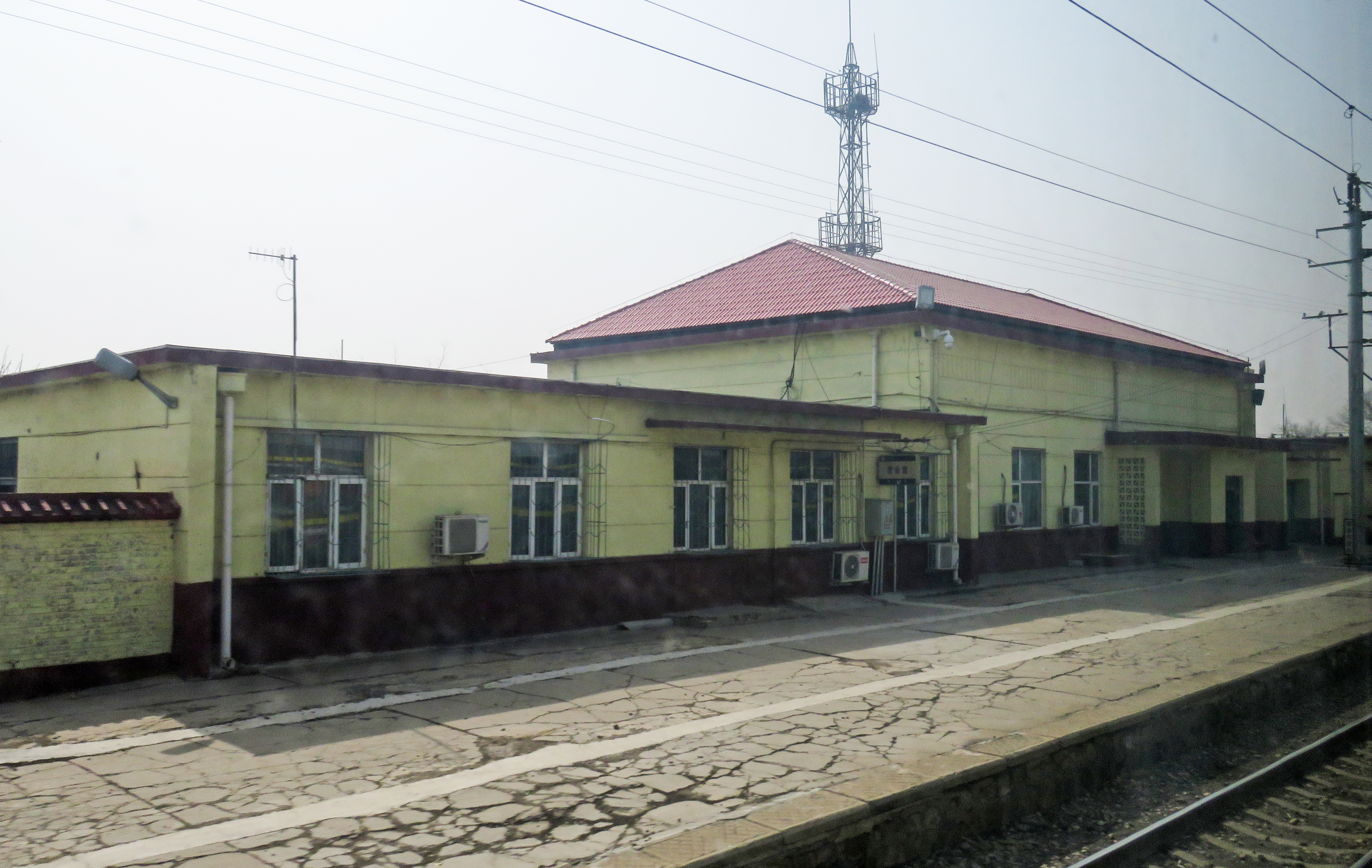

General information
- Location: Huailai County, Zhangjiakou, Hebei; China
- Line: Beijing-Baotou railway

Other information
- Station code: XLP

Xibali railway station (Chinese: 西八里站; pinyin: Xībālǐ Zhàn) is a station on the Beijing–Baotou railway. It is located in the town of Xibali, Huailai County, Hebei.

== See also ==
- List of stations on Jingbao railway
