= Qixiaying railway station =

Railway station in Inner Mongolia, China

Qixiaying railway station (simplified Chinese: 旗下营站) is a fourth-class railway station located in Fushengzhuang Township, Zhuozi County, Ulanqab City, Inner Mongolia, China (40.97496° N, 112.146° E). It is part of the Beijing–Baotou railway or Jingbao Railway, specifically on the Jining–Baotou section. The station was established in 1923 and is managed by the Jining Railway Operation Division under the Hohhot Railway Bureau. The station and its adjacent stations are electrified.

== Key details ==
- Station code: 12560
- Telegraph code: QXC
- Pinyin code: QXY
- Distance from major stations: Approximately 617 km from Beijing station and 215 km from Baotou station
- Adjacent stations: 6 km from Mengguying station (upstream) and 11 km from Minzu station (downstream)

== See also ==
- List of stations on Jingbao railway
- Rail transport in Inner Mongolia
