= Kangzhuang railway station =

Railway station in Beijing, China

Coordinates: 40°22′39.05″N 115°53′26.13″E

Kangzhuang 康庄
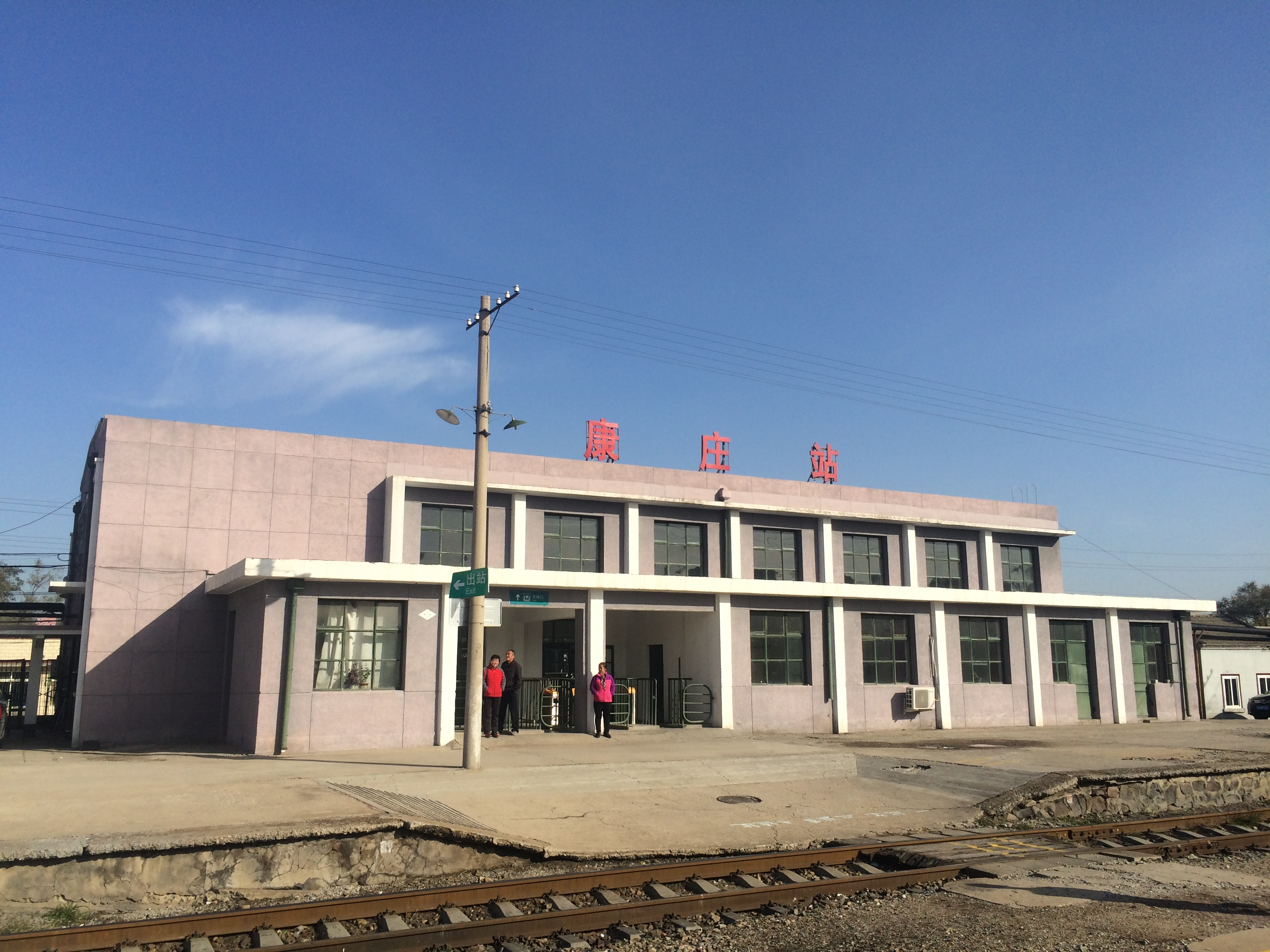
- Station in 2016 prior to renovation

General information
- Location: Yanqing, Beijing; China
- Lines: Beijing–Baotou Railway; Line S2

Kangzhuang railway station (康庄站) is a third-class station on the Jingbao Railway line. It is located in Kangzhuang, Yanqing District in the municipality of Beijing, northwest of the city center. The original station was part of the historic Beijing–Zhangjiakou Railway which went into operation in 1909. In 2023, renovation began to restore the station's original appearance.

== Gallery ==
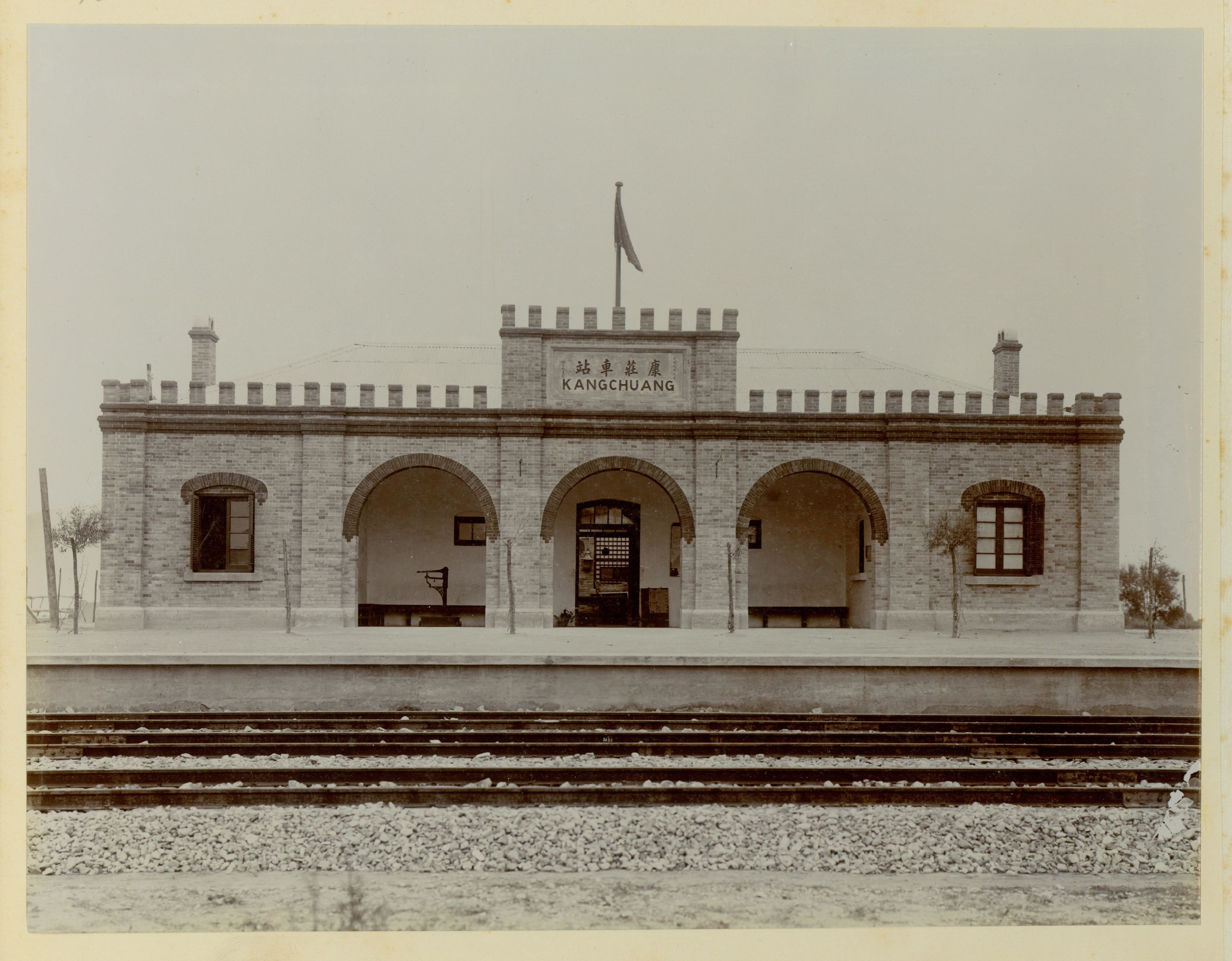
Original station c. 1909

== See also ==
- List of stations on Jingbao railway

Preceding station	Beijing Suburban Railway	Following station
Badaling towards Huangtudian	Line S2	Shacheng Terminus
