= Zhuozishan railway station =

Station in Inner Mongolia

Zhuozishan 卓资山站
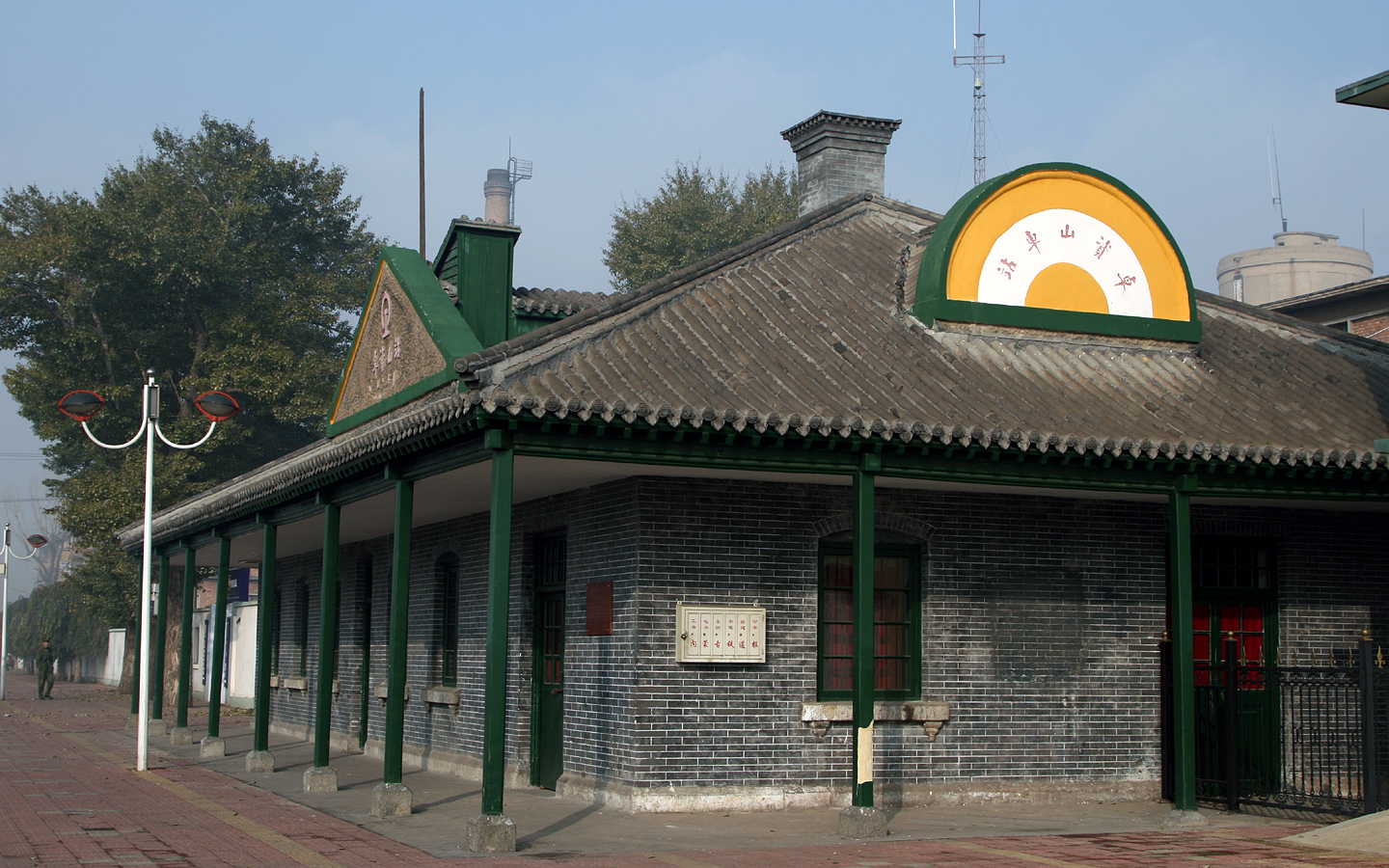

General information
- Location: Zhuozi County, Ulanqab, Inner Mongolia; China
- Operator: CR Hohhot
- Line: Beijing-Baotou railway

Other information
- Station code: ZZC

History
- Opened: 1923
Location

Zhuozishan railway station is a station of Jingbao Railway. It is located in Zhuozi County, Ulanqab, Inner Mongolia.

== See also ==
- List of stations on Jingbao railway
