= Shacheng railway station =

Railway station in Shacheng, Hebei, China

Coordinates: 40°23′46″N 115°31′02″E

Shacheng 沙城
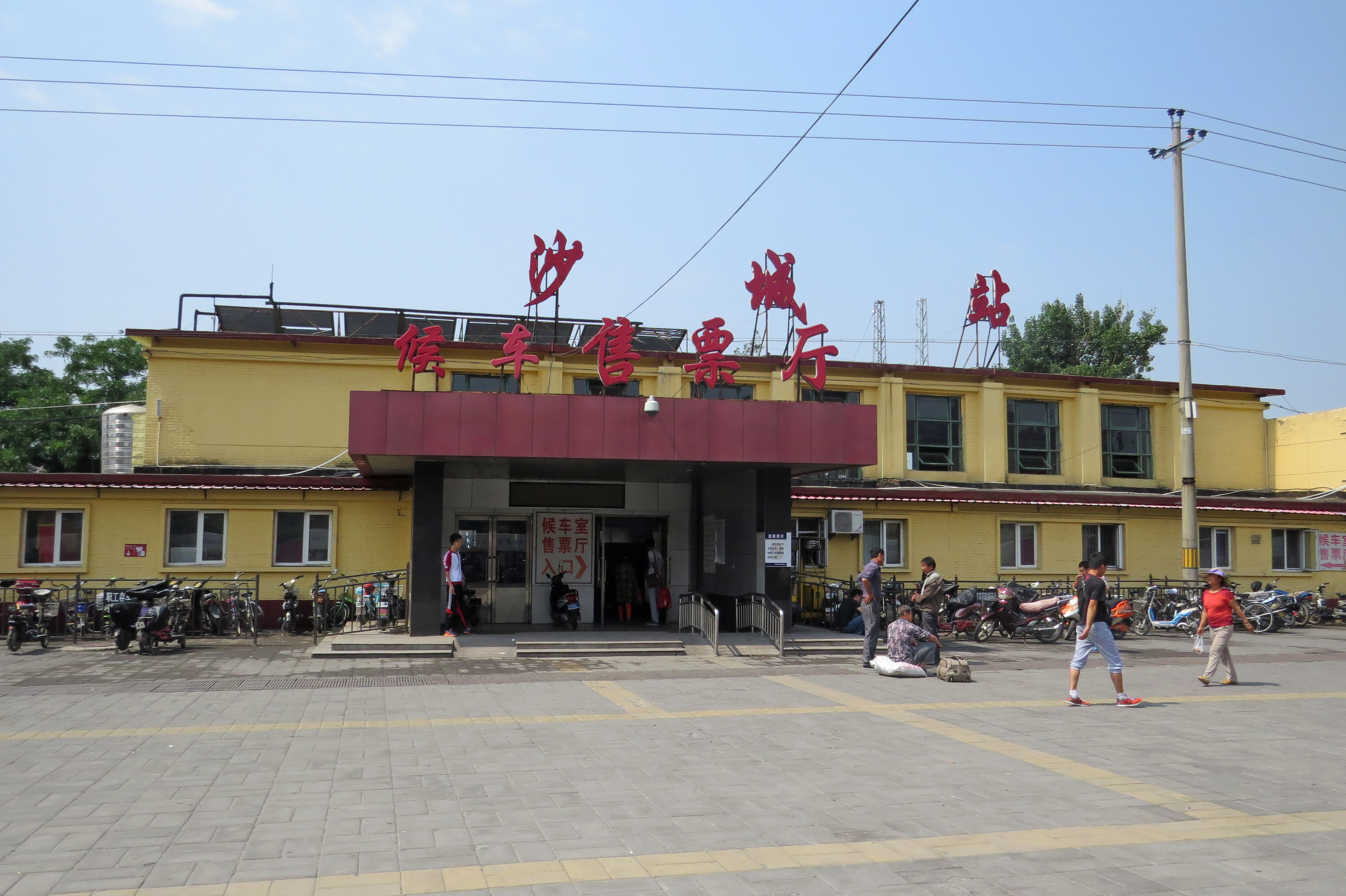

General information
- Location: Shacheng, Huailai County, Zhangjiakou, Hebei; China
- Operator: Beijing Railway Bureau, China Railway Corporation
- Lines: Beijing–Baotou Railway; Line S2; Fengsha Railway (丰沙铁路)
- Platforms: 2

History
- Opened: 1909
Location
- Location within Hebei

Shacheng railway station (Chinese: 沙城站; pinyin: Shāchéng zhàn) is a railway station on the Beijing–Baotou railway, Fengtai–Shacheng railway, located in Shacheng town, Huailai County, Zhangjiakou, Hebei.

== History ==
The station opened in 1909.

== See also ==
- List of stations on Jingbao railway

Preceding station	Beijing Suburban Railway	Following station
Kangzhuang towards Huangtudian	Line S2	Terminus
