= Tianzhen County =

Tianzhen County 天镇县 Tienchen
- County
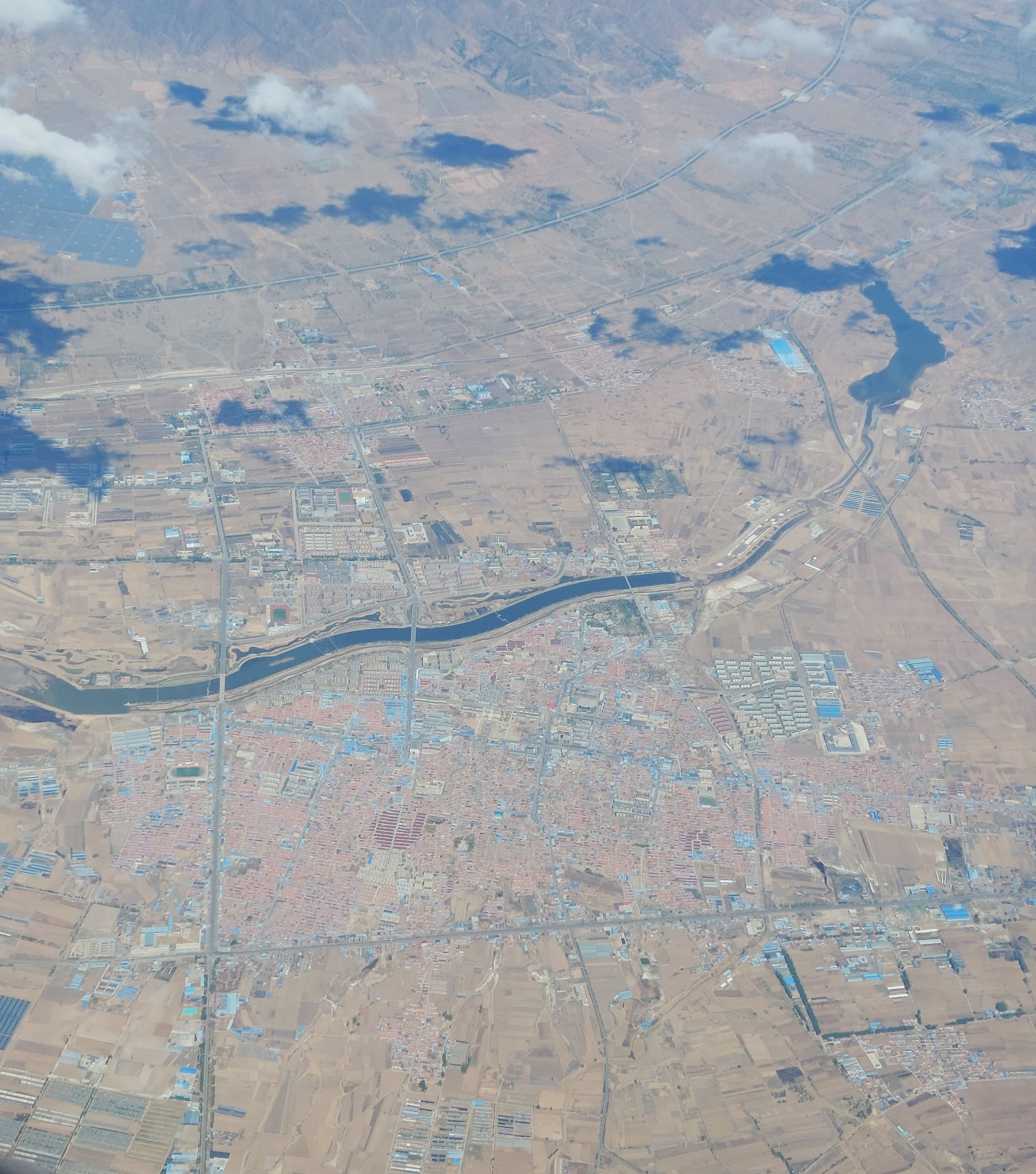
- Urban area from above

- Location of the seat in Shanxi
- Coordinates: 40°25′12″N 114°05′28″E
- Country: People's Republic of China
- Province: Shanxi
- Prefecture-level city: Datong
- Time zone: UTC+8 (China Standard)

Tianzhen County (simplified Chinese: 天镇县; traditional Chinese: 天鎮縣; pinyin: Tiānzhèn Xiàn) is a county of Shanxi province, China, bordering Hebei province to the northeast, east and south and Inner Mongolia to the northwest. It is under the administration of Datong City and is the northernmost county-level division of the province.

== Climate ==
Climate data for Tianzhen, elevation 1,015 m (3,330 ft), (1991–2020 normals, extremes 1981–2010)
Month	Jan	Feb	Mar	Apr	May	Jun	Jul	Aug	Sep	Oct	Nov	Dec	Year
Record high °C (°F)	11.0 (51.8)	18.1 (64.6)	25.0 (77.0)	32.1 (89.8)	36.2 (97.2)	38.1 (100.6)	38.1 (100.6)	35.5 (95.9)	34.7 (94.5)	28.1 (82.6)	21.3 (70.3)	14.3 (57.7)	38.1 (100.6)
Mean daily maximum °C (°F)	−2.8 (27.0)	2.0 (35.6)	9.1 (48.4)	17.4 (63.3)	23.8 (74.8)	27.6 (81.7)	28.7 (83.7)	27.2 (81.0)	22.7 (72.9)	15.4 (59.7)	6.1 (43.0)	−1.3 (29.7)	14.7 (58.4)
Daily mean °C (°F)	−10.4 (13.3)	−5.8 (21.6)	1.5 (34.7)	9.7 (49.5)	16.5 (61.7)	20.6 (69.1)	22.3 (72.1)	20.5 (68.9)	15.1 (59.2)	7.8 (46.0)	−1.1 (30.0)	−8.2 (17.2)	7.4 (45.3)
Mean daily minimum °C (°F)	−16.8 (1.8)	−12.4 (9.7)	−5.3 (22.5)	2.0 (35.6)	8.8 (47.8)	13.7 (56.7)	16.3 (61.3)	14.5 (58.1)	8.3 (46.9)	1.3 (34.3)	−6.8 (19.8)	−14.1 (6.6)	0.8 (33.4)
Record low °C (°F)	−37.4 (−35.3)	−28.3 (−18.9)	−21.0 (−5.8)	−10.0 (14.0)	−4.8 (23.4)	0.3 (32.5)	6.8 (44.2)	3.3 (37.9)	−2.3 (27.9)	−10.9 (12.4)	−27.7 (−17.9)	−32.2 (−26.0)	−37.4 (−35.3)
Average precipitation mm (inches)	1.4 (0.06)	2.8 (0.11)	7.4 (0.29)	17.9 (0.70)	35.7 (1.41)	62.7 (2.47)	105.0 (4.13)	77.0 (3.03)	53.9 (2.12)	21.8 (0.86)	7.7 (0.30)	1.5 (0.06)	394.8 (15.54)
Average precipitation days (≥ 0.1 mm)	1.3	2.0	3.6	4.6	7.2	12.0	13.6	11.5	9.2	5.3	3.0	1.2	74.5
Average snowy days	2.5	3.5	3.8	1.9	0.1	0	0	0	0	0.5	3.3	2.2	17.8
Average relative humidity (%)	52	46	41	37	40	53	67	70	64	56	54	51	53
Mean monthly sunshine hours	199.8	202.6	240.3	253.4	274.6	250.7	248.8	243.6	223.7	223.4	192.8	189.1	2,742.8
Percentage possible sunshine	67	67	64	63	61	56	55	58	61	66	65	66	62
Source: China Meteorological Administration
