= Huangtudian railway station =

Railway station in Beijing, China

Huangtudian 黄土店
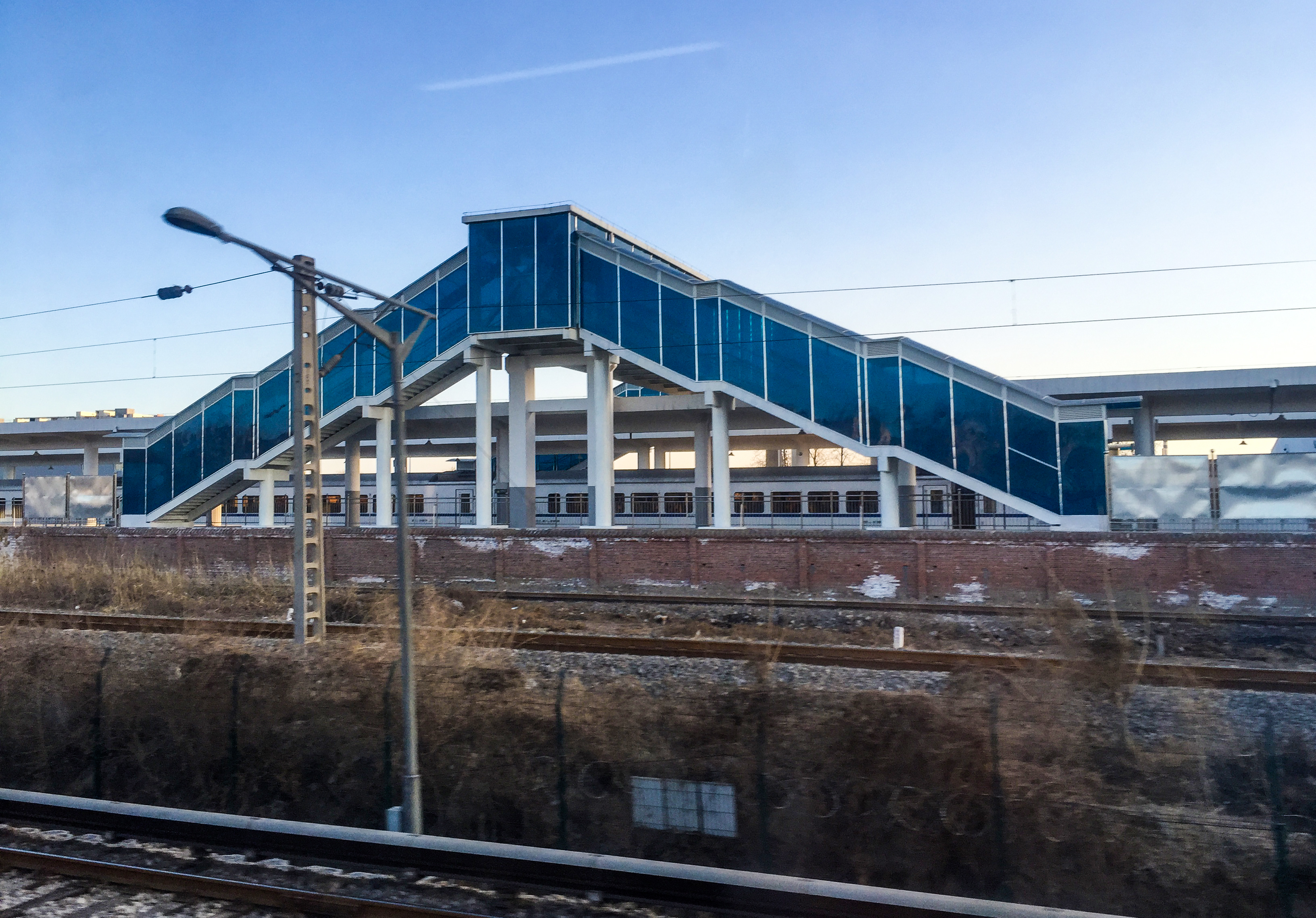

General information
- Location: Changping, Beijing; China
- Coordinates: 40°04′11″N 116°21′48″E
- Lines: Beijing Northeast Ring railway (Shuangqiao–Shahe railway); Line S2

Other information
- Station code: TMIS code: 12167; Telegraph code: HKP; Pinyin code: HTD
- Classification: 4th class station

Services
Preceding station	Beijing Suburban Railway	Following station
Terminus	Line S2	Nankou towards Shacheng or Yanqing
Location
- Location within Beijing

Huangtudian railway station (simplified Chinese: 黄土店站; traditional Chinese: 黃土店站; pinyin: Huángtǔdiàn Zhàn) is a railway station in Changping District, Beijing. The station was constructed in 1966. It is a 4th-class station as of 2006.

The terminus of Line S2 of the Beijing Suburban Railway was changed to this station in November 2016.

The station is located just south of Huoying station on Beijing Subway Line 8 and Line 13.
