= Baotou railway station =

Railway station in Baotou, China

Baotou 包头
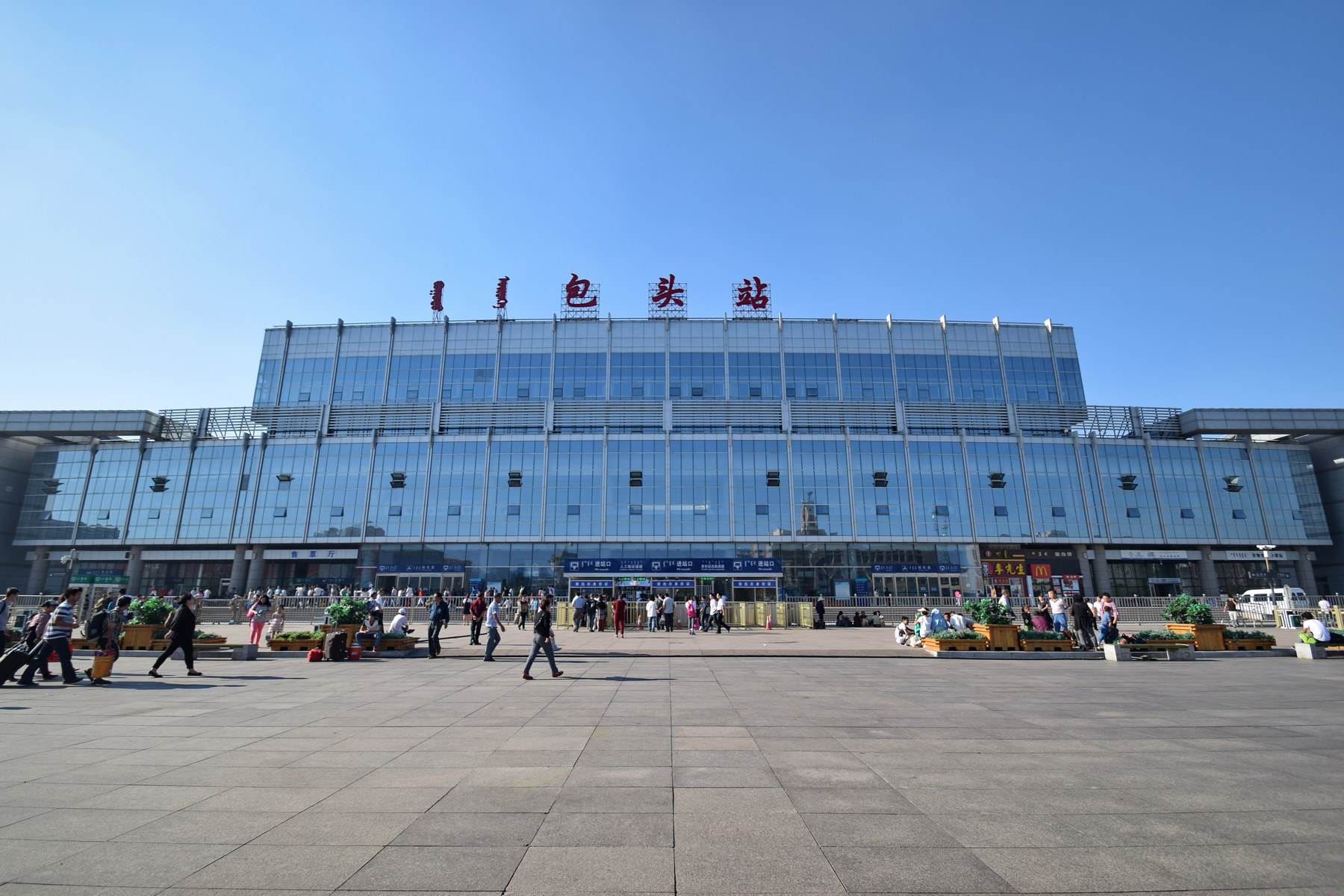

General information
- Location: A'erding Dajie, Kundulun District, Baotou, Inner Mongolia; China
- Coordinates: 40°36′18″N 109°49′49″E
- Operated by: CR Hohhot
- Lines: Jingbao Railway, Baolan Railway (包兰铁路), Baobai Railway (包白铁路), Baoshen Railway (包神铁路); Baotou–Xi'an railway Baotou–Yinchuan high-speed railway (under construction)
- Platforms: 3
- Connections: Bus terminal

Other information
- Station code: BTC

History
- Opened: 1956
- Previous names: Taiotan
Location

Baotou railway station (simplified Chinese: 包头站; traditional Chinese: 包頭站; pinyin: Bāotóu zhàn) is a railway station of Jingbao Railway, Baolan Railway, Baobai Railway and Baoshen Railway. The station is located in Baotou, Inner Mongolia, China.

== History ==
The station opened in 1956.

In 2024, refurbishment of the station began as part of the Baotou–Yinchuan high-speed railway project.

== See also ==
- List of stations on Jingbao railway
