= Ulanqab–Datong high-speed railway =

Railway line in China

Ulanqab–Datong high-speed railway 集大原高速铁路

Overview
- Status: Open
- Locale: Shanxi & Inner Mongolia, China
- Termini: Ulanqab; Datong South

Service
- Type: High-speed rail
- System: China Railway
- Operator(s): CR Taiyuan Group & CR Hohhot Group

Technical
- Line length: 137.8 km (85.6 mi)
- Track gauge: 1,435 mm (4 ft 8 1/2 in) standard gauge
- Minimum radius: 7,000 m (23,000 ft) (general); 5,500 m (18,000 ft) (difficult)
- Electrification: 25 kV AC
- Operating speed: 250 km/h (160 mph), 300 km/h (190 mph) (reserved)
- Signalling: Automatic block
- Maximum incline: 2% (general)

The Ulanqab–Datong high-speed railway (Chinese: 乌大高速铁路; pinyin: Wū dà gāosù tiělù), formerly known as the Jining–Datong–Yuanping high-speed railway, Jining–Datong section (Chinese: 集大原高速铁路集宁至大同段; pinyin: Jí dàyuán gāosù tiělù jí níng zhì dàtóng duàn) is a Chinese high-speed railway connecting Ulanqab in Inner Mongolia to Datong in Shanxi province. The line starts from Ulanqab station in Chahar Right Wing Front Banner in Ulanqab, passes through Fengzhen North in Fengzhen, and ends at Datong South in Datong, Shanxi Province, and connects with the Datong–Zhangjiakou HSR. The total length is 137.8 km (85.6 mi), and it is an important part of the Hohhot–Nanning corridor, one of the Eight Vertical and Eight Horizontal high-speed railway network. The entire line was opened to traffic on 31 December 2024.

== History ==
In December 2018, the Ulanqab–Datong high-speed railway was incorporated into the study of its predecessor, the Jining–Datong–Yuanping high-speed railway, and design work was carried out. The project was initiated by the National Development and Reform Commission and led by China Railway Corporation.

On 27 March 2019, the Shanxi Provincial Development and Reform Commission, together with the Inner Mongolia Autonomous Region Development and Reform Commission, held a meeting to promote the preliminary work of the Jining–Datong–Yuanping HSR. In December, Inner Mongolia Railway Investment Co., Ltd. and Shanxi Datong–Yuanping Railway Co., Ltd. commissioned China Railway Design Group Co., Ltd. to carry out the environmental impact assessment of the Jining–Datong–Yuanping HSR. On 12 December, the environmental impact assessment of the Jining–Datong–Yuanping HSR was publicly announced for the first time. On 27 December, the National Development and Reform Commission approved the Feasibility Study Report for the New Jining–Datong–Yuanping Railway.

On 18 May 2020, the second environmental impact assessment announcement for the Jining–Datong–Yuanping HSR was issued. On 30 June, the groundbreaking ceremony for the Jining–Datong–Yuanping HSR was held in Shuozhou City.

On 17 November 2021, construction officially began on the Shanxi section.

On 29 May 2023, the continuous beam of the Jining–Datong–Yuanping HSR across the Beijing–Baotou railway was successfully rotated into place. On 4 September, the box girder of the Jida-Yuanping high-speed railway across the Beijing-Baotou passenger dedicated line was successfully erected.

On 16 March 2024, China State Railway Group Co., Ltd. issued a notice announcing the names of the newly built Jining–Datong–Yuanping HSR, among which the Ulanqab–Datong South section was named the Ulanqab–Datong high-speed railway.

On 28 September 2024, the laying of tracks for the entire Ulanqab–Datong HSR was completed. On 4 October, the high-speed railway entered the joint commissioning and testing phase. On 26 November, the entire Urumqi–Datong HSR entered the operation test phase. On 17 December, the China State Railway Group acceptance team held a preliminary acceptance summary meeting for the Jining–Datong–Yuanping HSR project. At the summary meeting, the whole Jining–Datong–Yuanping HSR project passed the preliminary acceptance. On 18 December, the Jining–Datong–Yuanping HSR entered the safety assessment phase. On 31 December, the Urumqi–Datong HSR officially opened for operation, thus allowing the central regions and cities of Inner Mongolia to connect to the south via the high-speed railway.
