= Zhangjiakou–Hohhot high-speed railway =

Railway line in China

Zhangjiakou-Hohhot high-speed railway 张呼客运专线
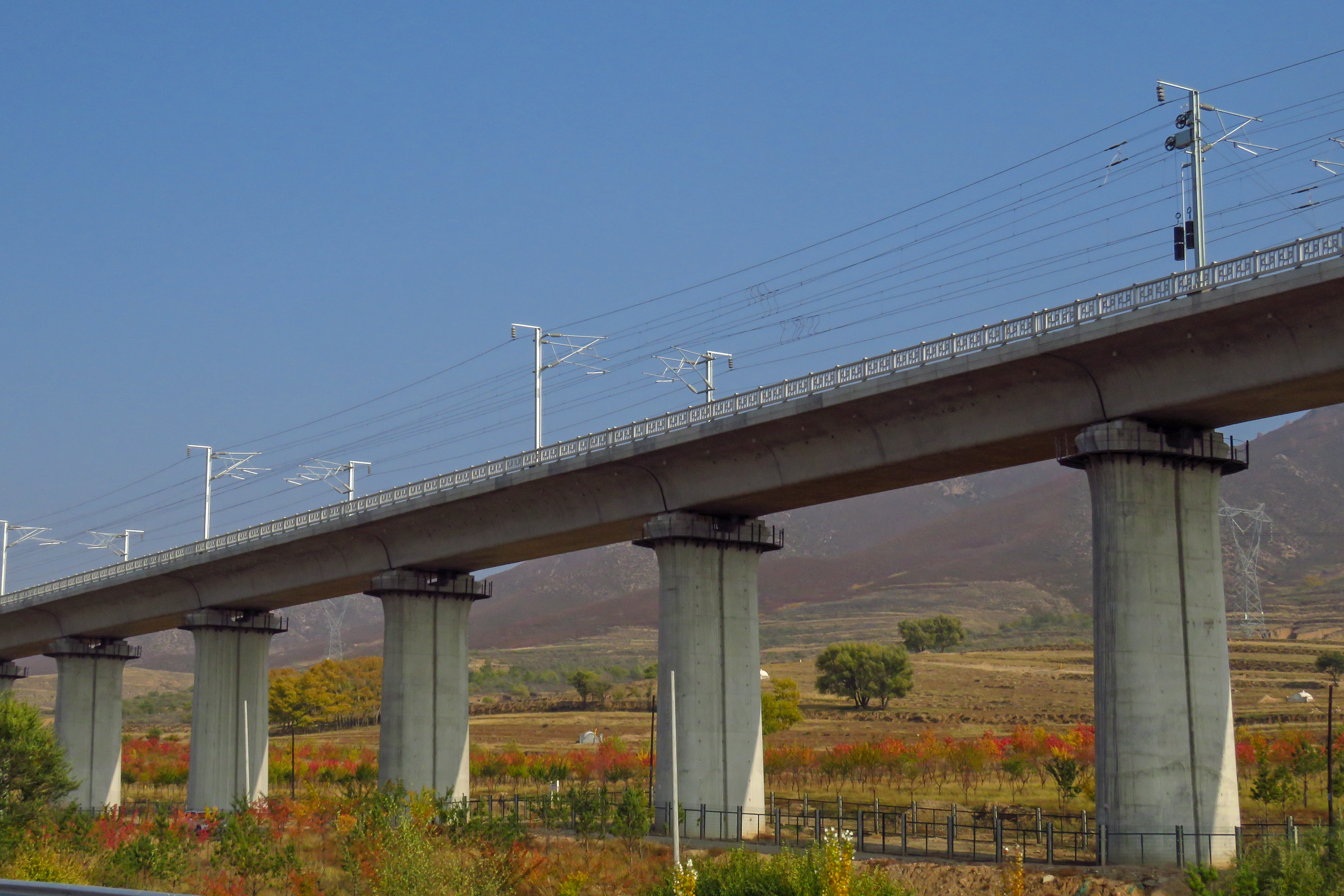

Overview
- Status: In Operation
- Locale: Zhangjiakou; Hohhot
- Termini: Zhangjiakou; Hohhot East
- Stations: 7

Service
- Type: High-speed rail
- Services: 1
- Operator: China Railway High-speed

History
- Opened: 30 December 2019

Technical
- Line length: 286.803 km (178 mi)
- Track gauge: 1,435 mm (4 ft 8 1/2 in)
- Operating speed: 250 km/h (155.3 mph)

The Zhangjiakou-Hohhot high-speed railway is a high-speed railway located in China. It connects Hohhot, the capital city of Inner Mongolia, to Zhangjiakou in Hebei province. The line has a length of 286 km (178 mi) as a double-tracked passenger dedicated line, with seven stations situated along its route. Construction was commenced on April 28, 2014. Connection with the Beijing–Zhangjiakou intercity railway enables high speed rail services from the central region of Inner Mongolia to Beijing, reducing the travel time between Beijing and Hohhot from nine hours to under three hours. The western section from Ulanqab to Hohhot East was opened on August 3, 2017. The section from Zhangjiakou to Ulanqab opened in December 2019.

== Stations ==
| Station Name | Chinese | China Railway transfers/connections | Metro transfers | Location | | |
|---|---|---|---|---|---|---|
| Zhangjiakou | 张家口 | Beijing–Zhangjiakou intercity railway Datong–Zhangjiakou high-speed railway | | Qiaodong | Zhangjiakou | Hebei |
| Huai'an | 怀安 | | | Huai'an | Zhangjiakou | Hebei |
| Xinghe North | 兴和北 | | | Xinghe | Ulanqab | Inner Mongolia |
| Ulanqab | 乌兰察布 | | | Qahar Right Front Banner | Ulanqab | Inner Mongolia |
| Zhuozi East | 卓资东 | | | Zhuozi | Ulanqab | Inner Mongolia |
| Qixiaying South | 旗下营南 | | | Zhuozi | Ulanqab | Inner Mongolia |
| Hohhot East | 呼和浩特东 | | Hohhot Metro: 1 | Xincheng | Hohhot | Inner Mongolia |

== Route description ==
Starting from Zhangjiakou, heading west through Wanquan County and Huai'an County to Huai'an. Continuing westward through Shangyi County before crossing the border into Inner Mongolia's Xinghe County to Xinghe North. Further westward across the Qahar Right Front Banner to the Jining District to Ulanqab. Shadowing the route of the G6 Expressway the line then comes to Zhuozi East in Zhuozi County along with Qixiaying South. Finally this line terminates at Hohhot East.
