= Xinghe North railway station =

Railway station in Ulanqab, Inner Mongolia, China

Xinghe North 兴和北站

General information
- Location: Xinghe County, Ulanqab, Inner Mongolia; China
- Coordinates: 40.891359°N 113.835781°E
- Operated by: China Railway Corporation
- Line(s): Zhangjiakou–Hohhot high-speed railway

Xinghe North railway station (Chinese: 兴和北站) is a railway station of the Zhangjiakou–Hohhot high-speed railway. It is located in Xinghe County, Ulanqab, Inner Mongolia.

Preceding station	China Railway High-speed	Following station
Huai'an towards Zhangjiakou (opened in 1957)	Zhangjiakou–Hohhot high-speed railway	Ulanqab towards Hohhot East
