= Zhuozi East railway station =

Railway station in Ulanqab, China

Zhuozi East 卓资东站

General information
- Location: Zhuozi County, Ulanqab, Inner Mongolia; China
- Coordinates: 40°55′22.96″N 112°36′42.59″E
- Operated by: China Railway Corporation
- Line(s): Zhangjiakou–Hohhot high-speed railway

Zhuozi East railway station (Chinese: 卓资东站) is a railway station of the Zhangjiakou–Hohhot high-speed railway. It is located in Zhuozi County, Ulanqab, Inner Mongolia.

Preceding station	China Railway High-speed	Following station
Ulanqab towards Zhangjiakou (opened in 1957)	Zhangjiakou–Hohhot high-speed railway	Qixiaying South towards Hohhot East
