= Ulanqab railway station =

Railway station in Ulanqab, China

Ulanqab 乌兰察布站
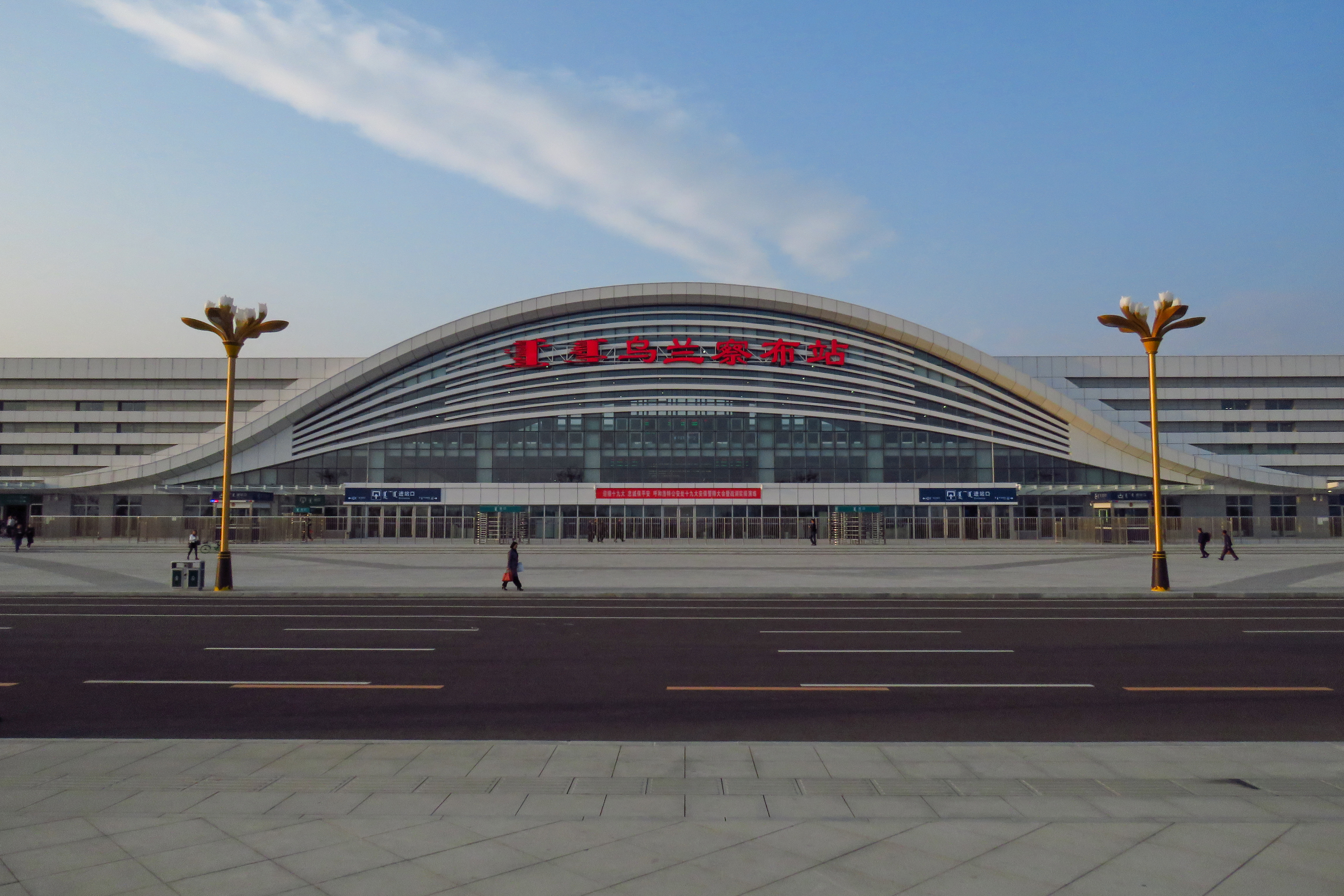
- ᠤᠯᠠᠭᠠᠨᠴᠠᠪ ᠥᠷᠲᠡᠭᠡ

General information
- Location: Huangqihai, Qahar Right Front Banner, Ulanqab, Inner Mongolia; China
- Coordinates: 40.963239°N 113.152311°E
- Operated by: China Railway Hohhot Group
- Line(s): Zhangjiakou–Hohhot high-speed railway Ulanqab–Datong–Yuanping high-speed railway

Services
Preceding station	China Railway High-speed	Following station
Xinghe North towards Zhangjiakou (opened in 1957)	Zhangjiakou–Hohhot high-speed railway	Zhuozi East towards Hohhot East

Ulanqab railway station (Chinese: 乌兰察布站; pinyin: Wūlánchábù zhàn) is a railway station of the Zhangjiakou–Hohhot high-speed railway and the Jining–Datong–Yuanping high-speed railway in Huangqihai, Qahar Right Front Banner, Ulanqab, Inner Mongolia, China.
