= Zhangjiakou railway station (disambiguation) =

Zhangjiakou railway station is a station on the Beijing-Zhangjiakou intercity railway.

Zhangjiakou railway station may also refer to Zhangjiakou railway station (1909), a station closed in July 2014.

== See also ==
- Zhangjiakou South railway station
