= Zhangjiakou railway station =

Railway station in Zhangjiakou, China

Zhangjiakou railway station 张家口站
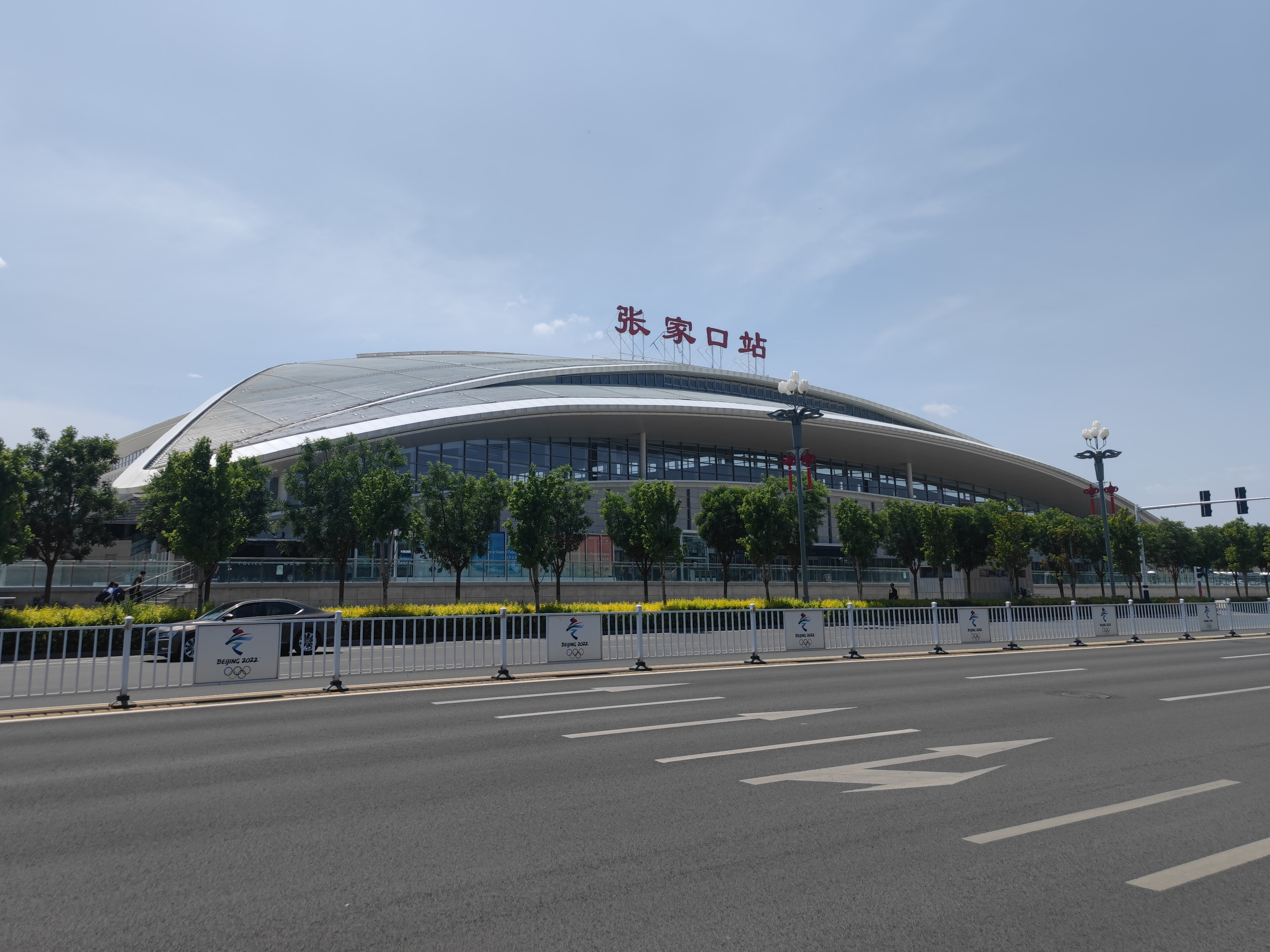
- Zhangjiakou railway station

General information
- Other names: Zhangjiakou South railway station
- Location: Qiaodong District, Zhangjiakou, Hebei; China
- Coordinates: 40°45′02.43″N 114°52′37.09″E
- Operator: Beijing Railway Bureau, China Railway Corporation
- Lines: Jingbao Railway, Zhangji Railway, Beijing–Zhangjiakou intercity railway
- Platforms: 6
- Tracks: 16

Other information
- Station code: TMIS code: 12308; Telegraph code: ZMP; Pinyin code: ZJK

History
- Opened: 1957
- Closed: November 12, 2017 (Reconstruction)
- Former names: Zhangjiakou South

Services
Preceding station	China Railway High-speed	Following station
Terminus	Zhangjiakou–Hohhot high-speed railway	Huai'an towards Hohhot East
Huai'an towards Datong South	Datong–Zhangjiakou high-speed railway	Terminus
Xuanhua North towards Beijing North	Beijing–Zhangjiakou intercity railway	Terminus
Location

Zhangjiakou railway station (Note: simplified Chinese: 张家口站; traditional Chinese: 張家口站; pinyin: Zhāngjiākǒu Zhàn) (Formerly Zhangjiakou South railway station (Note: simplified Chinese: 张家口南站; traditional Chinese: 張家口南站; pinyin: Zhāngjiākǒu Nán Zhàn)) is a railway station of the Beijing–Zhangjiakou intercity railway, Zhangjiakou–Hohhot high-speed railway, Datong–Zhangjiakou high-speed railway, Jingbao Railway and Zhangji Railway and located in Zhangjiakou, Hebei, China.

== History ==
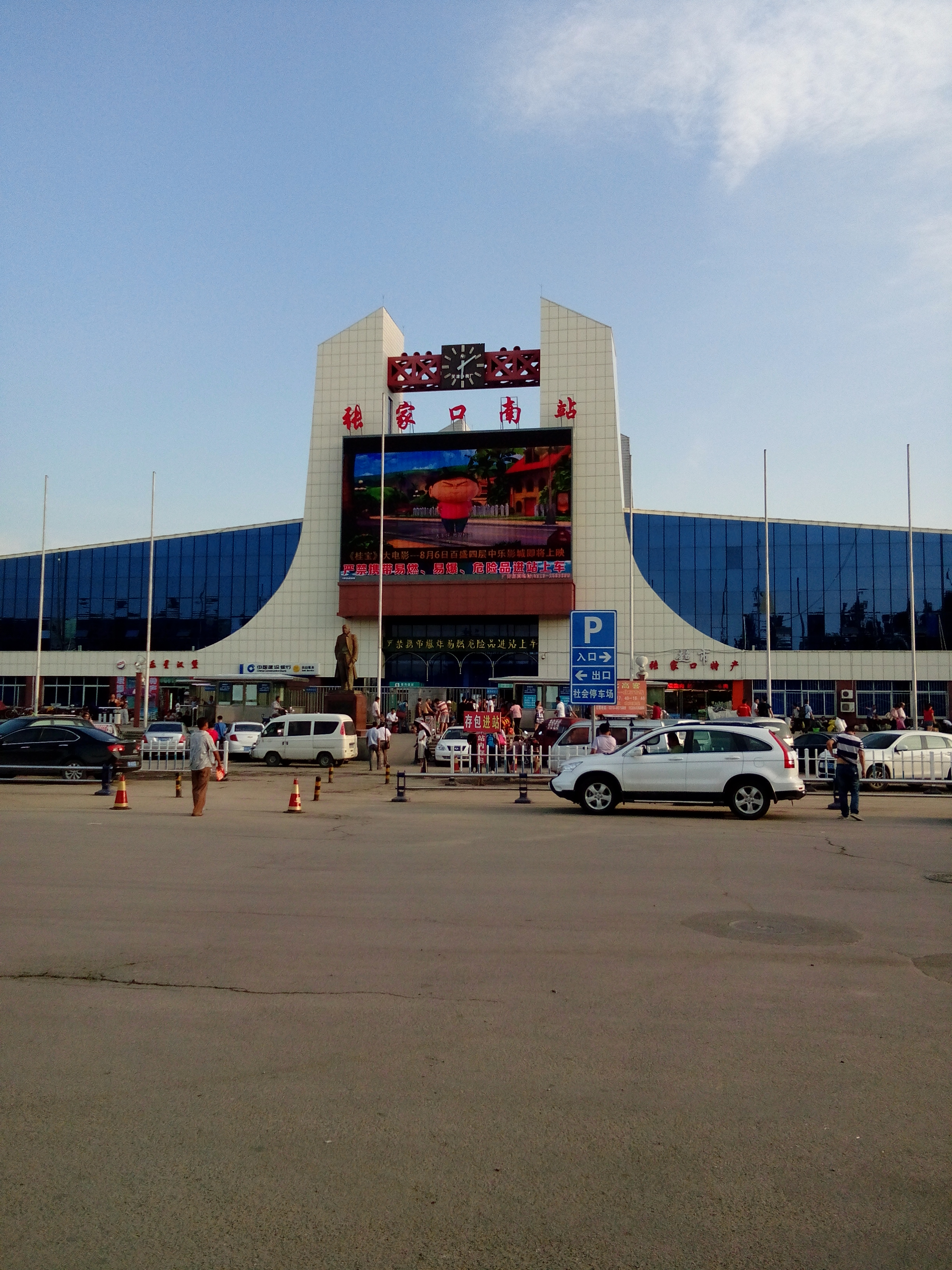
The original station building in 2015

The station was constructed in 1956 and officially opened in 1957. It belongs to the Beijing Railway Administration and the Beijing-Baotou Railway railway routes.

The line is the terminus of the Beijing–Zhangjiakou intercity railway, the Zhangjiakou–Hohhot high-speed railway and the Datong–Zhangjiakou high-speed railway.

=== Reconstruction ===
As of November 12, 2017, the railway station, which had been operating for 60 years on the Beijing-Baotou Railway, was officially closed down in preparation for the new Beijing–Zhangjiakou intercity railway. Passenger trains that had originally arrived and stopped at the station were all transferred to Zhangjiakou South railway station. It was re-opened on December 30, 2019.

=== Renaming of the station ===
On March 3, 2019, the station was renamed to Zhangjiakou railway station, and what was known as Shalingzi West railway station is now known as Zhangjiakou South railway station.

== See also ==
- List of stations on Jingbao railway
