= Chen Fengxiang =

Chinese diplomat and political figure

Chen Fengxiang (Chinese: 陈凤翔; born September 1955) is a Chinese diplomat and political figure. He was born in Chahar Right Front Banner, Inner Mongolia. He graduated from Peking University with a degree in Russian language. From 1992 to 1994, he served in the office of the ambassador in Russia. Beginning in 2004, he became assistant to the head of the International Department of the Chinese Communist Party, then in 2013, he was promoted to deputy head.
