= Xinghe (disambiguation) =

Xinghe may refer to:

- Xinghe County, a county in Inner Mongolia, China
- Xinghe, Shaanxi (杏河), a town in Zhidan County, Shaanxi, China
- Xinghe Korean Ethnic Township (兴和朝鲜族乡), a township in Suihua, Heilongjiang, China
- Xinghe (興和, 539–542), era name used by Emperor Xiaojing of Eastern Wei
