= Huai'an railway station =

Huai'an railway station can refer to:

- Huai'an railway station (Hebei)
- Huai'an railway station (Jiangsu)

== See also ==
- Hui'an railway station
