= Qahar Right Rear Banner =

Qahar Right Rear Banner 察哈尔右翼后旗 • ᠴᠠᠬᠠᠷ ᠪᠠᠷᠠᠭᠤᠨ ᠭᠠᠷᠤᠨ ᠬᠣᠶᠢᠲᠤ ᠬᠣᠰᠢᠭᠤ
- Banner
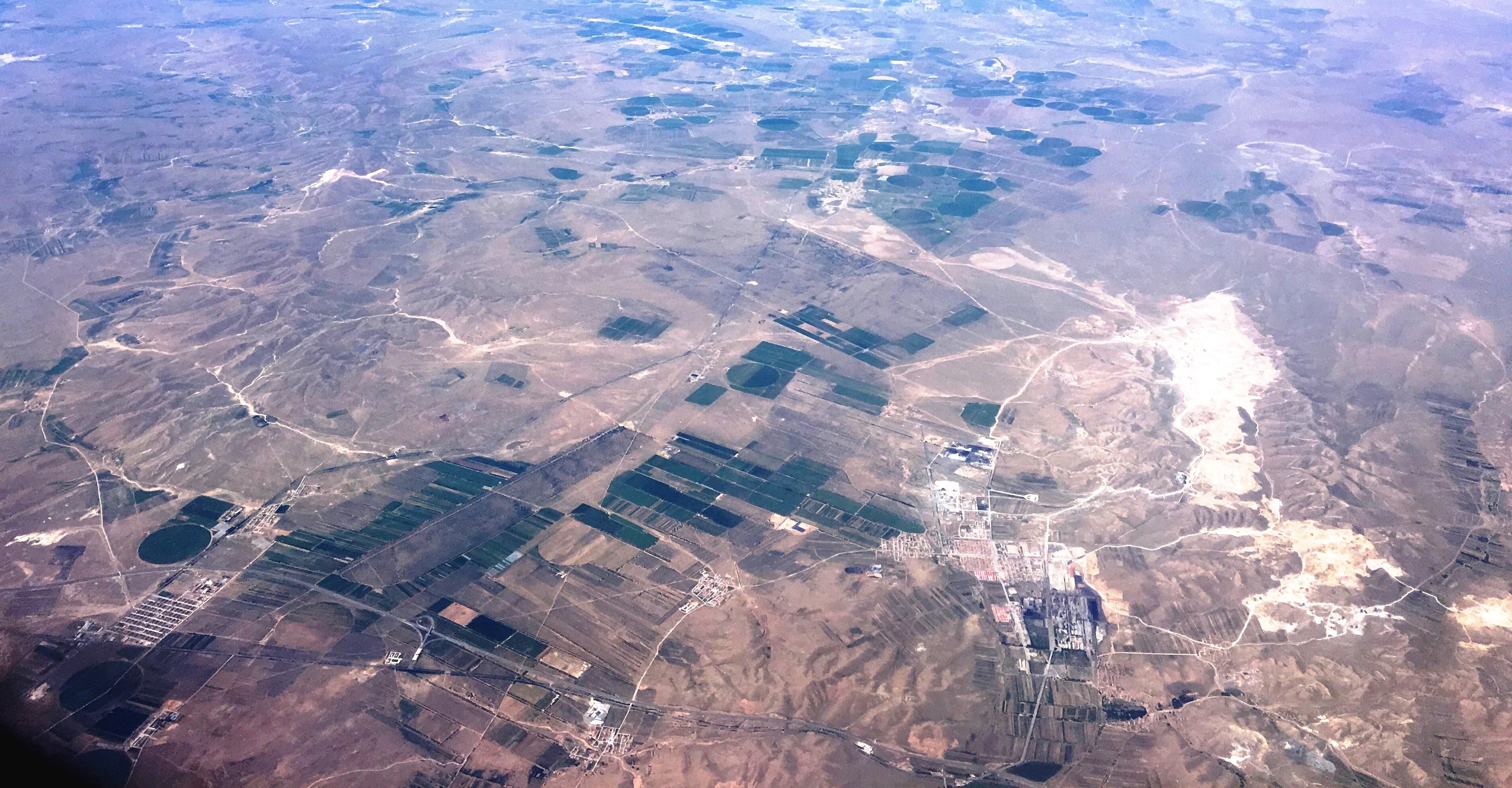
- Aerial view over central parts of the county, with agriculture and Guangmingcun open-pit mine.

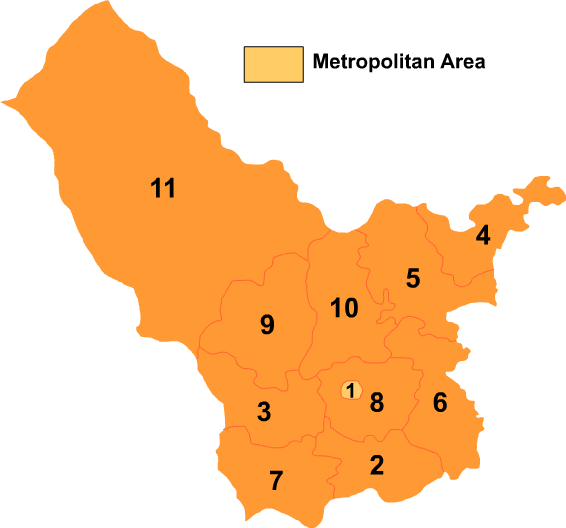
- Ulanqab's divisions: Chahar Right Rear Banner is 10 on this map

- Location in Inner Mongolia Chahar RRB (China)
- Coordinates: 41°26′N 113°11′E
- Country: China
- Autonomous region: Inner Mongolia
- Prefecture-level city: Ulaan Chab
- Banner seat: Bayan Qagan

Area
  - Total: 3,774 km^{2} (1,457 sq mi)
- Elevation: 1,440 m (4,720 ft)

Population (2020)
  - Total: 103,599
  - Density: 27.45/km^{2} (71.10/sq mi)
- Time zone: UTC+8 (China Standard)
- Website: www.cyhq.gov.cn

Qahar Right Rear Banner

Chinese name
- Simplified Chinese: 察哈尔右翼后旗
- Traditional Chinese: 察哈爾右翼後旗
Transcriptions
Standard Mandarin
- Hanyu Pinyin: Cháhā'ěr Yòuyì Hòuqí

Mongolian name
- Mongolian Cyrillic: Цахар баруун гарын хойд хошуу
- Mongolian script: ᠴᠠᠬᠠᠷ ᠪᠠᠷᠠᠭᠤᠨ ᠭᠠᠷᠤᠨ ᠬᠣᠶᠢᠲᠤ ᠬᠣᠰᠢᠭᠤ
Transcriptions
- SASM/GNC: Čaqar Baraɣun Ɣarun Qoyitu qosiɣu

Chahar Right Rear Banner (Mongolian: ᠴᠠᠬᠠᠷ ᠪᠠᠷᠠᠭᠤᠨ ᠭᠠᠷᠤᠨ ᠬᠣᠶᠢᠲᠤ ᠬᠣᠰᠢᠭᠤ; Chinese: 察哈尔右翼后旗) is a banner of Inner Mongolia, China, bordering Shangdu County to the northeast, Xinghe County to the southeast, Qahar Right Front Banner to the south, Zhuozi County to the southwest, Qahar Right Rear Banner to the west, Dorbod Banner to the northwest, and Xilingol League to the north. It is under the administration of Ulanqab City, which lies to the south along the G55 Erenhot–Guangzhou Expressway. The most important settlement in the banner is Bayan Qagan.

== Administrative divisions ==
Chahar Right Rear Banner is made up of five towns, one township, and two sums.

Name	Simplified Chinese	Hanyu Pinyin	Mongolian (Hudum Script)	Mongolian (Cyrillic)	Administrative division code
Towns
Bayan Qagan Town	白音察干镇	Báiyīnchágān Zhèn	ᠪᠠᠶᠠᠨᠴᠠᠭᠠᠨ ᠪᠠᠯᠭᠠᠰᠤ	Баянцагаан балгас	150928105
Tomortai Town	土牧尔台镇	Tǔmù'ěrtái Zhèn	ᠲᠡᠮᠦᠷᠲᠠᠢ ᠪᠠᠯᠭᠠᠰᠤ	Төмөртай балгас	150928106
Honggilt Town	红格尔图镇	Hónggé'ěrtú Zhèn	ᠬᠣᠩᠭᠢᠶᠠᠯᠲᠤ ᠪᠠᠯᠭᠠᠰᠤ	Хонгиолд балгас	150928107
Bunghan Town	贲红镇	Bēnhóng Zhèn	ᠪᠤᠩᠬᠤᠨ ᠪᠠᠯᠭᠠᠰᠤ	Бунхан балгас	150928108
Daliuhao Town	大六号镇	Dàliùhào Zhèn	ᠳ᠋ᠠ ᠯᠢᠦ ᠬᠣᠤ ᠪᠠᠯᠭᠠᠰᠤ	Да лиу хоо балгас	150928109
Township
Xil Township	锡勒乡	Xīlè Xiāng	ᠰᠢᠯᠢ ᠰᠢᠶᠠᠩ	Шил шиян	150928211
Sums
Dolon Hudag Sum	当郎忽洞苏木	Dānglánghūdòng Sūmù	ᠳᠣᠯᠣᠭᠠᠨᠬᠤᠳᠳᠤᠭ ᠰᠤᠮᠤ	Тулаанахудаг сум	150928209
Ulan Had Sum	乌兰哈达苏木	Wūlánhādá Sūmù	ᠤᠯᠠᠭᠠᠨᠬᠠᠳᠠ ᠰᠤᠮᠤ	Улаанахта сум	150928210

== Climate ==
Climate data for Chahar Right Rear Banner, elevation 1,424 m (4,672 ft), (1991–2020 normals, extremes 1981–2010)
Month	Jan	Feb	Mar	Apr	May	Jun	Jul	Aug	Sep	Oct	Nov	Dec	Year
Record high °C (°F)	9.0 (48.2)	14.9 (58.8)	21.0 (69.8)	29.7 (85.5)	32.7 (90.9)	38.0 (100.4)	38.1 (100.6)	33.3 (91.9)	33.2 (91.8)	25.4 (77.7)	18.2 (64.8)	12.2 (54.0)	38.1 (100.6)
Mean daily maximum °C (°F)	−6.3 (20.7)	−1.8 (28.8)	5.3 (41.5)	13.7 (56.7)	20.3 (68.5)	24.9 (76.8)	26.8 (80.2)	25.2 (77.4)	20.1 (68.2)	12.2 (54.0)	2.9 (37.2)	−4.6 (23.7)	11.6 (52.8)
Daily mean °C (°F)	−13.3 (8.1)	−9.3 (15.3)	−1.9 (28.6)	6.6 (43.9)	13.6 (56.5)	18.5 (65.3)	20.8 (69.4)	18.9 (66.0)	13.2 (55.8)	5.2 (41.4)	−3.8 (25.2)	−11.1 (12.0)	4.8 (40.6)
Mean daily minimum °C (°F)	−18.6 (−1.5)	−15.0 (5.0)	−8.1 (17.4)	−0.2 (31.6)	6.6 (43.9)	12.0 (53.6)	14.8 (58.6)	12.8 (55.0)	7.0 (44.6)	−0.4 (31.3)	−8.8 (16.2)	−16.0 (3.2)	−1.2 (29.9)
Record low °C (°F)	−31.2 (−24.2)	−32.8 (−27.0)	−26.0 (−14.8)	−14.9 (5.2)	−7.5 (18.5)	−0.5 (31.1)	5.6 (42.1)	1.4 (34.5)	−8.5 (16.7)	−17.3 (0.9)	−32.5 (−26.5)	−30.5 (−22.9)	−32.8 (−27.0)
Average precipitation mm (inches)	1.6 (0.06)	1.9 (0.07)	5.5 (0.22)	14.1 (0.56)	31.5 (1.24)	50.7 (2.00)	94.6 (3.72)	59.2 (2.33)	38.4 (1.51)	17.5 (0.69)	5.5 (0.22)	2.1 (0.08)	322.6 (12.7)
Average precipitation days (≥ 0.1 mm)	2.6	2.7	3.7	4.7	7.3	11.0	13.2	10.7	8.8	5.1	3.9	3.2	76.9
Average snowy days	5.8	5.3	5.7	3.6	0.7	0	0	0	0.3	2.5	6.2	6.9	37
Average relative humidity (%)	59	51	42	36	38	48	59	61	55	52	55	58	51
Mean monthly sunshine hours	201.2	203.1	243.8	254.5	280.1	256.5	253.3	251.4	230.8	230.9	192.7	186.3	2,784.6
Percentage possible sunshine	68	67	65	63	62	57	56	60	63	68	66	66	63
Source: China Meteorological Administration
