= Huai'an railway station (Hebei) =

Railway station in Zhangjiakou, Hebei, China

Huai'an 怀安
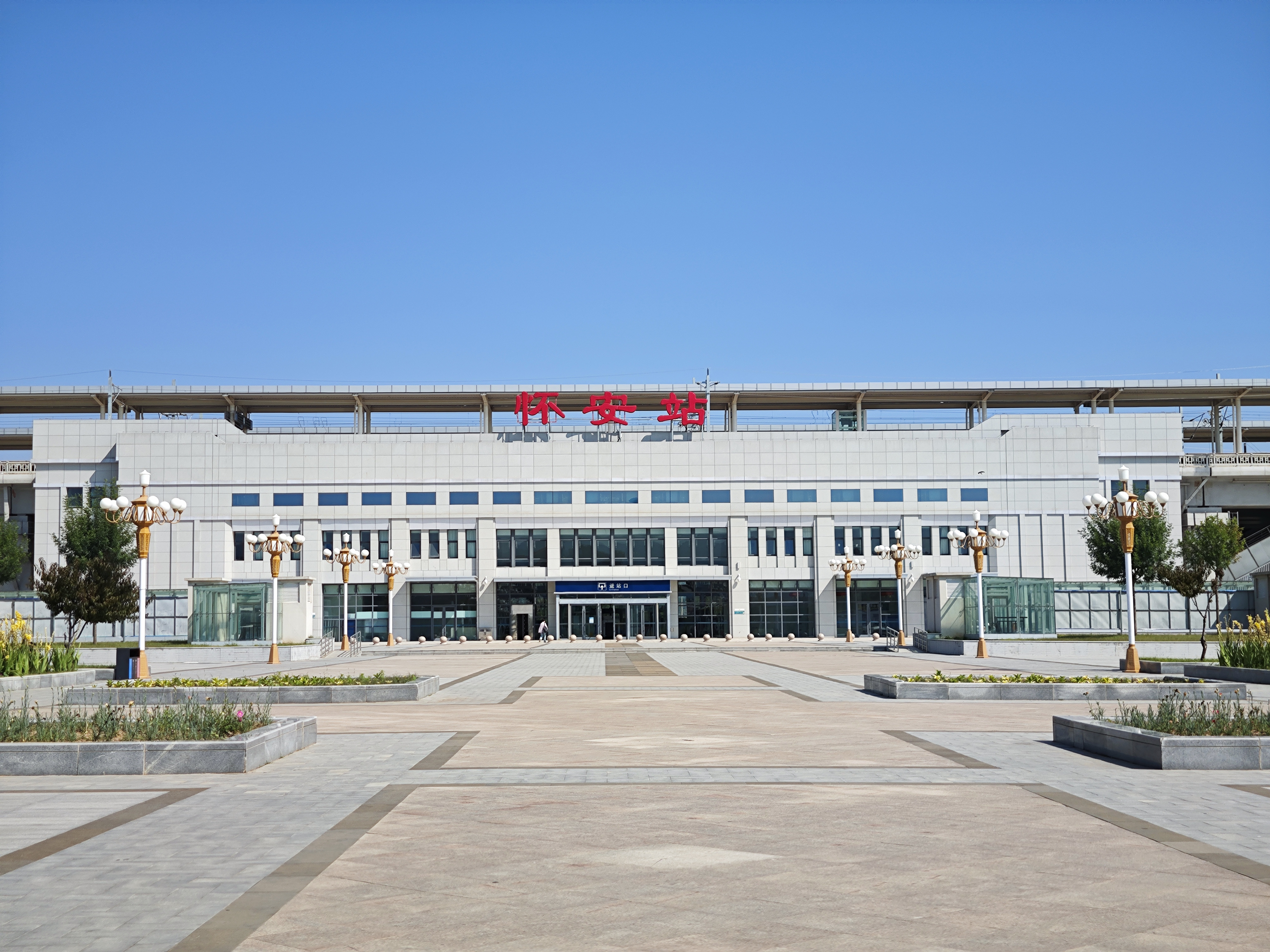

General information
- Location: Huai'an County, Zhangjiakou, Hebei; China
- Coordinates: 40.684626°N 114.393649°E
- System: Passenger station
- Owner: China Railway Beijing Group
- Lines: Zhangjiakou–Hohhot high-speed railway; Datong–Zhangjiakou high-speed railway
- Platforms: 2
- Tracks: 6

Construction
- Platform levels: 3

History
- Opened: December 30, 2019
Location

Huai'an railway station (Note: simplified Chinese: 怀安站; traditional Chinese: 懷安站; pinyin: Huái'ān Zhàn) is a railway station of Zhangjiakou–Hohhot high-speed railway and Datong–Zhangjiakou high-speed railway located in Chaigoubu town, Huai'an County, Zhangjiakou, Hebei, China, opening on December 30, 2019.

The total area of the station is 13,720 square metres (147,700 sq ft), and the building area is 4,490 square metres (48,300 sq ft), with 85.5m long and 62.7m wide. There are 2 platforms and 6 tracks in this station. There is also a square in front of the station.

== Notes ==
Preceding station	China Railway High-speed	Following station
Zhangjiakou (opened in 1957) Terminus	Zhangjiakou–Hohhot high-speed railway	Xinghe North towards Hohhot East
Tianzhen towards Datong South	Datong–Zhangjiakou high-speed railway	Zhangjiakou (opened in 1957) Terminus
