= Ulanqab Stadium =

Sports venue in Ulanqab, China

- 乌兰察布体育场
- Location in Inner Mongolia Ulanqab Stadium (China)
- Location: Ulanqab, Inner Mongolia, China
- Coordinates: 40.9876°N 113.1367°E
- Capacity: 30,000

Construction
- Groundbreaking: 2005
- Opened: 2009
- Renovated: 2017
- Cost: 230 million yuan

The Ulanqab (Wulanchabu) Stadium (Chinese: 乌兰察布体育场) is a multi-purpose stadium in Ulanqab, Inner Mongolia, China. It has a seating capacity of 30,000. Construction began on 7 June 2005 and the stadium was opened in 2009, costing 230 million yuan to build.

The stadium has been designated as the main venue for the 14th Inner Mongolia Games which will be held in Ulanqab in 2018. In preparation for the games, it was closed in June 2017 for comprehensive renovation and upgrading of facilities.
