= Zhangjiakou South railway station =

Railway station in Zhangjiakou, China

Zhangjiakou South railway station 张家口南站
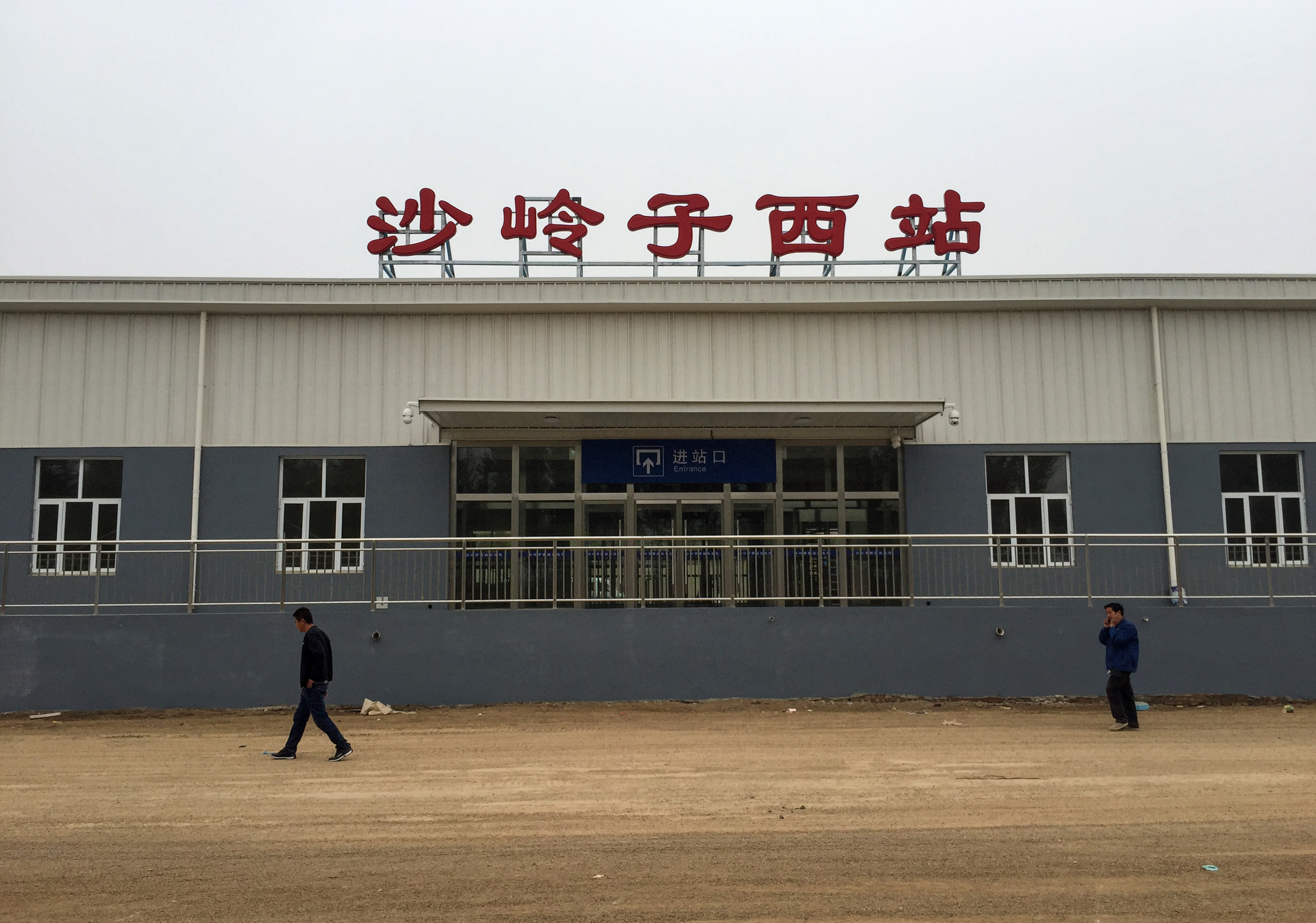
- Shalingzi West railway station (before being renamed)

General information
- Location: Qiaoxi District, Zhangjiakou, Hebei; China
- Coordinates: 40°42′16″N 114°52′49″E
- Operator: Beijing Railway Bureau; China Railway Corporation
- Platforms: 2

Other information
- Station code: TMIS code: 10991; Telegraph code: IXP; Pinyin code: SLX

History
- Opened: 30 December 2015 (freight); 12 November 2017 (passenger)
- Former names: Shalingzi West

Services
Preceding station	China Railway	Following station
Zhangjiakou towards Beijing North	Beijing–Baotou railway	Kongjiazhuang towards Baotou
Location
- Location within Hebei

The Zhangjiakou South railway station (Note: simplified Chinese: 张家口南站; traditional Chinese: 張家口南站; pinyin: Zhājiākǒu Nán Zhàn) (formerly Shalingzi West railway station (Note: simplified Chinese: 沙岭子西站; traditional Chinese: 沙嶺子西站; pinyin: Shālǐngzǐ Xī Zhàn)) is a railway station on the Beijing–Baotou railway located in Zhangjiakou, Hebei which was initially meant for only freight traffic and was opened for civilian use in late 2017 to service the trains that were originally meant to arrive and depart from Zhangjiakou railway station.

== History ==
Zhangjiakou railway station was opened on December 30, 2015. At the time, it only handled the technical operation of freight trains. The Zhangtang railway freight engineers used this station to switch shifts. The upstream railway station is Kongjiazhuang railway station. The downstream railway station is Zhaochuan North railway station.

=== Opening for passenger use ===
On November 12, 2017, the trains that were originally meant to arrive and depart from Zhangjiakou railway station were moved here due to reconstruction. Currently, Shalingzi West railway station is the main station for people living in the Zhangjiakou area.

=== Renaming of the station ===
On March 3, 2019, the station was renamed to Zhangjiakou South railway station and the original Zhangjiakou South railway station was renamed to Zhangjiakou railway station.

== Interior ==
The station covers around 1,000 square meters. Within the station the ticket office and the waiting room are both connected within one big hall, only being separated by the ticket checking gate.

== Transportation ==
Because Zhangjiakou South railway station is much farther away from the city center than the Zhangjiakou railway station, the bus routes 1, 10, 11 and 33 were extended to arrive at this destination. Also an additional new express bus line between the two stations was opened. Passengers can take this bus to arrive to and depart from either railway station.

== See also ==
- List of stations on Jingbao railway
