= Kongjiazhuang railway station =

Railway station in Zhangjiakou, China

Coordinates: 40.7593°N 114.7282°E

Kongjiazhuang 孔家庄站
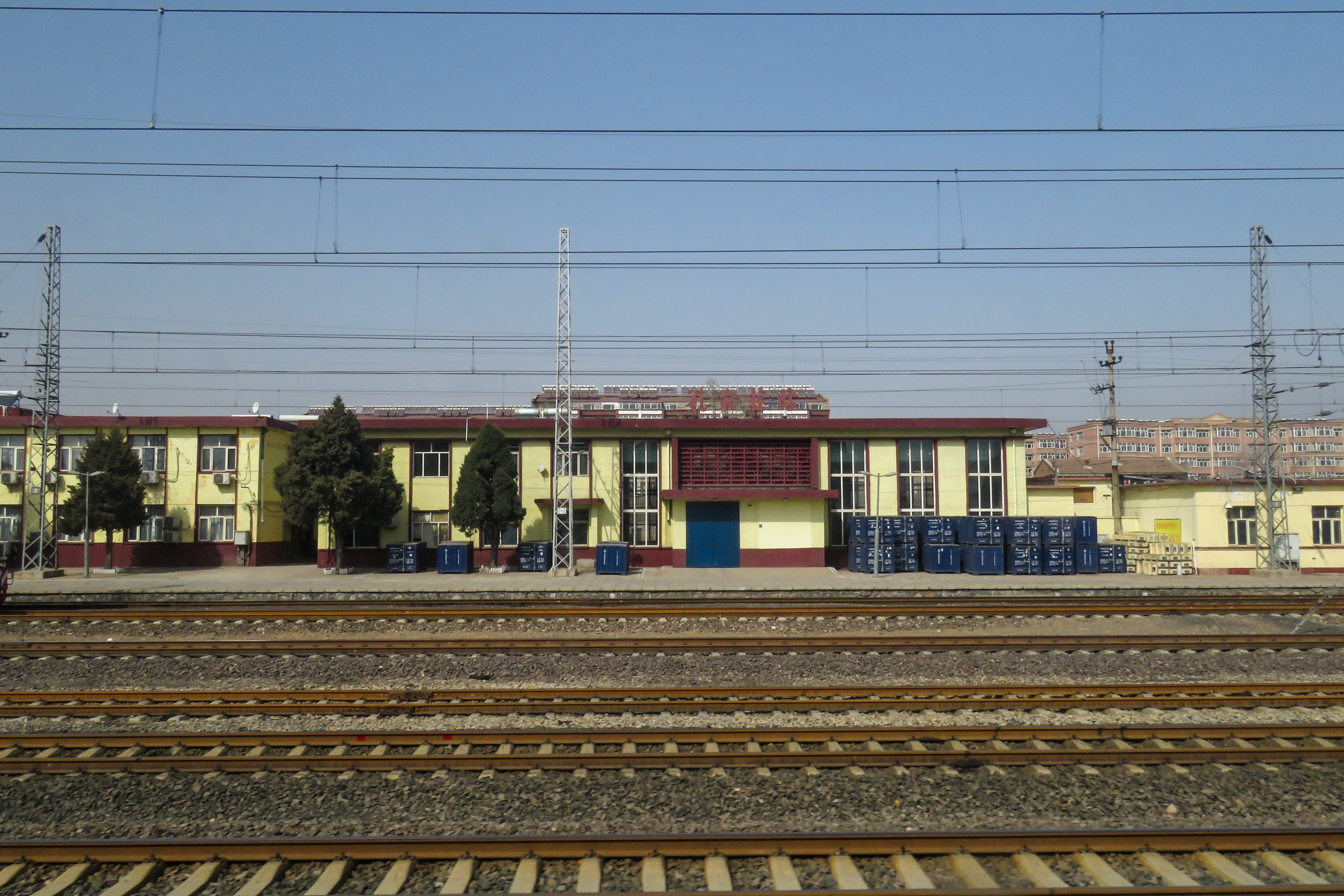

General information
- Location: Wanquan District, Zhangjiakou, Hebei; China
- Line: Beijing-Baotou railway

Other information
- Station code: KJP

History
- Opened: 1909
Location

The Kongjiazhuang railway station (Chinese: 孔家庄站; pinyin: Kǒng jiā zhuāng zhàn) is a station in Kongjiazhuang Town), Wanquan, Zhangjiakou, Hebei. Built in 1910, the station is 217 kilometres (135 mi) away from Beijing railway station and 615 kilometres (382 mi) away from Baotou railway station. It is under the jurisdiction of the China Railway Beijing Group and is a fourth-class station.

== See also ==
- List of stations on Jingbao railway
