= Datong–Zhangjiakou high-speed railway =

Railway line in China

Datong–Zhangjiakou high-speed railway 大张客运专线

Overview
- Other name: Dazhang passenger dedicated line
- Status: In operation
- Locale: Hebei; Shanxi
- Termini: Datong South; Zhangjiakou
- Stations: 5

Service
- Type: High-speed rail
- System: China Railway
- Services: 1
- Operator: China Railway High-speed

History
- Opened: 30 December 2019

Technical
- Line length: 141.524 km (87.939 mi)
- Track gauge: 1,435 mm (4 ft 8 1/2 in) standard gauge
- Minimum radius: 4,000 m (13,000 ft)
- Operating speed: 250 km/h (160 mph)
- Signalling: Automatic block
- Maximum incline: 2.0%, 2.5% in difficult areas

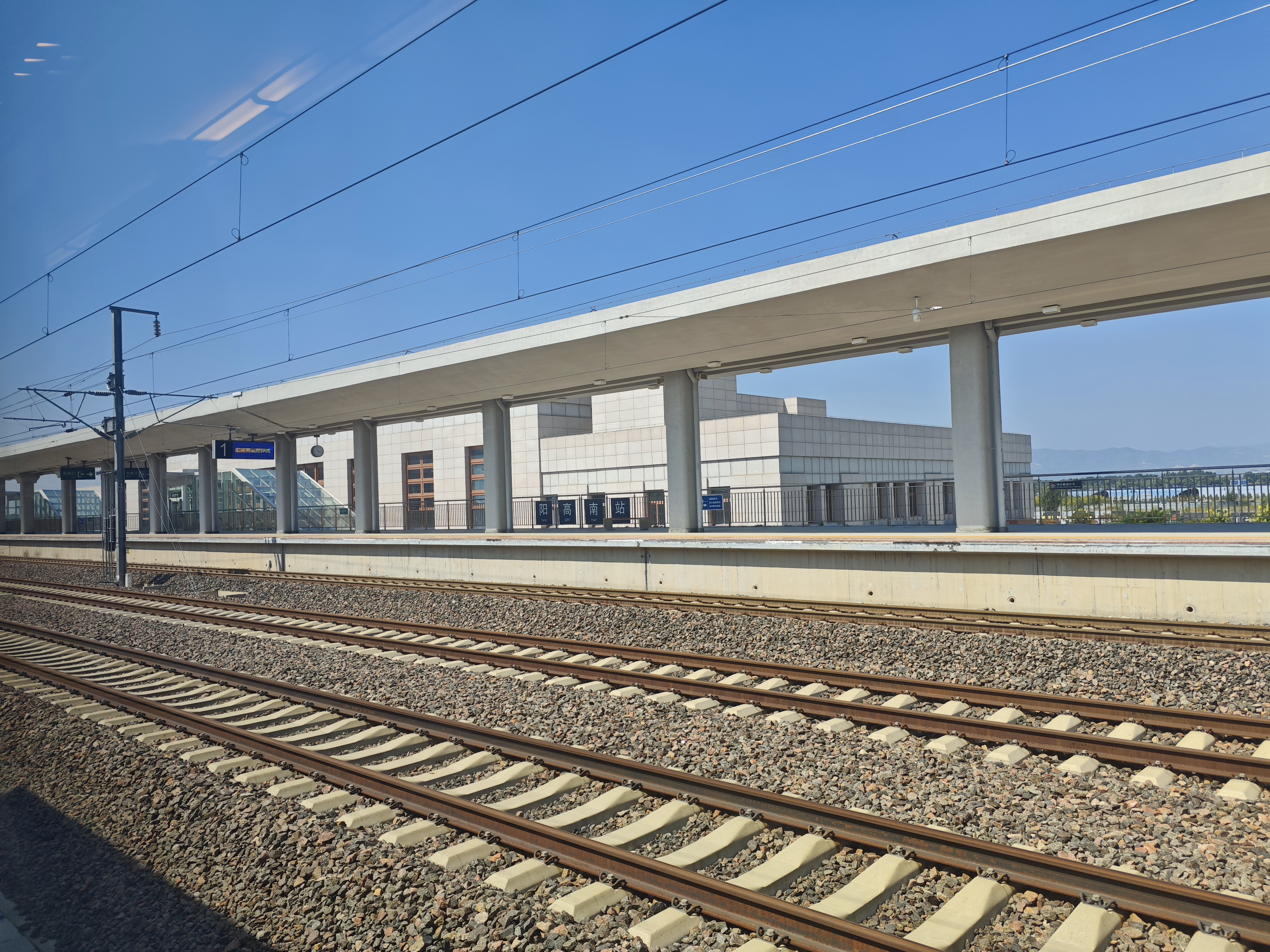
Yanggaonan Station on the Zhangjiakou-Datong High-Speed Railway

The Datong–Zhangjiakou high-speed railway, also known as the Dazhang passenger dedicated line (Chinese: 大张客运专线; pinyin: Dàzhāng kèyùn zhuānxiàn), is a high-speed railway connecting Zhangjiakou in Hebei province (eastern terminus) and Datong in Shanxi province (western terminus). The main line is approximately 141.524 kilometres (87.939 mi) long and includes five stations. It connects to the Beijing–Zhangjiakou intercity railway at Zhangjiakou station and shares tracks with the Huzhang Passenger Dedicated Line between Zhangjiakou station and Huai'an station. The line diverges at Huai'an Station and connects to the Datong–Xi'an passenger railway at Datong South. It forms part of the Beijing–Zhangjiakou–Datong–Taiyuan branch of the Beijing–Kunming corridor.

== History ==
Commissioning and testing began on 13 September 2019, and operations started on 30 December 2019.
