= China National Highway 208 =

Road in China

National Highway 208
- 208国道

Route information
- Length: 990 km (620 mi)

Major junctions
- From: Erenhot, Inner Mongolia
- To: Xichuan County, Henan

Location
- Country: China

Highway system
- National Trunk Highway System; Primary; Auxiliary
← G207	→ G209

China National Highway 208 (G208) runs from Erenhot, Inner Mongolia to Xichuan County, Henan province. It is 990 kilometres in length and runs south from Erenhot, via Shanxi towards Henan province. The road is part of Asian Highway 3.

== Route and distance ==
Route and distance

City	Distance (km)
Erenhot, Inner Mongolia	0
Sonid Youqi, Inner Mongolia	114
Sonid Zuoqi (Mandalt), Inner Mongolia	285
Jining, Inner Mongolia	348
Qahar Youyi Qianqi, Inner Mongolia	379
Fengzhen, Inner Mongolia	445
Datong, Shanxi	490
Huairen, Shanxi	532
Shanyin, Shanxi	574
Yangmingbao, Shanxi	642
Yuanping, Shanxi	678
Xinzhou, Shanxi	711
Yangqu, Shanxi	754
Taiyuan, Shanxi	775
Xiaodianqu, Shanxi	788
Qinxian, Shanxi	907
Changzhi, Shanxi	990

== See also ==
- China National Highways
- AH3
