= Xinghe County =

Xinghe County 兴和县 • ᠰᠢᠩ ᠾᠧ ᠰᠢᠶᠠᠨ Hingho
- County
- Location in Inner Mongolia Xinghe (China)
- Coordinates: 40°52′N 113°50′E
- Country: China
- Autonomous region: Inner Mongolia
- Prefecture-level city: Ulanqab
- County seat: Chengguan

Area
  - Total: 3,506 km^{2} (1,354 sq mi)
- Elevation: 1,279 m (4,196 ft)

Population (2020)
  - Total: 167,881
  - Density: 47.88/km^{2} (124.0/sq mi)
- Time zone: UTC+8 (China Standard)
- Website: www.xinghe.gov.cn

Xinghe County

Chinese name
- Simplified Chinese: 兴和县
- Traditional Chinese: 興和縣
Transcriptions
Standard Mandarin
- Hanyu Pinyin: Xīnghé Xiàn

Mongolian name
- Mongolian Cyrillic: Шинхэ шянь
- Mongolian script: ᠰᠢᠩ ᠾᠧ ᠰᠢᠶᠠᠨ
Transcriptions
- SASM/GNC: Siŋ hė siyan

Xinghe County (Mongolian: ᠰᠢᠩ ᠾᠧ ᠰᠢᠶᠠᠨ; Chinese: 兴和县) is a county of south-central Inner Mongolia, China, bordering the provinces of Hebei to the east and Shanxi to the south. It is under the administration of Ulanqab City, and is situated on the China National Highway 110 between Ulanqab and Zhangjiakou in Hebei province. Bordering county-level divisions include Fengzhen City to the southwest, Chahar Right Front Banner to the west, Chahar Right Back Banner to the northwest, and Shangdu County to the north.

== Administrative divisions ==
Xinghe County is made up of 5 towns and 4 townships.

Name	Simplified Chinese	Hanyu Pinyin	Mongolian (Hudum Script)	Mongolian (Cyrillic)	Administrative division code
Towns
Chengguan Town	城关镇	Chéngguān Zhèn	ᠴᠧᠩ ᠭᠤᠸᠠᠨ ᠪᠠᠯᠭᠠᠰᠤ	Цэн гуан балгас	150924106
Zhanggao Town	张皋镇	Zhānggāo Zhèn	ᠴᠠᠩ ᠭᠣᠤ ᠪᠠᠯᠭᠠᠰᠤ	Цан гуу балгас	150924107
Sain Us Town	赛乌素镇	Sàiwūsù Zhèn	ᠰᠠᠢᠨᠤ᠋ᠰᠤ ᠪᠠᠯᠭᠠᠰᠤ	Сайнос балгас	150924108
Erden Town	鄂尔栋镇	È'ěrdòng Zhèn	ᠡᠷᠳᠡᠨᠢ ᠪᠠᠯᠭᠠᠰᠤ	Эрдэн балгас	150924109
Dianzi Town	店子镇	Diànzǐ Zhèn	ᠳ᠋ᠢᠶᠠᠨ ᠽᠢ ᠪᠠᠯᠭᠠᠰᠤ	Даяан зи балгас	150924110
Townships
Ih Hure Township	大库联乡	Dàkùlián Xiāng	ᠶᠡᠬᠡ ᠬᠦᠷᠢᠶ᠎ᠡ ᠰᠢᠶᠠᠩ	Их хүрээ шиян	150924209
National Unity Township	民族团结乡	Mínzú Tuánjié Xiāng	ᠦᠨᠳᠦᠰᠦᠲᠡᠨ ᠪᠦᠯᠬᠦᠮᠳᠡᠬᠦ ᠰᠢᠶᠠᠩ	Үндэстэн бүлгэмдэх шиян	150924210
Datongyao Township	大同夭乡	Dàtóngyāo Xiāng	ᠳ᠋ᠠ ᠲᠦᠩ ᠶᠣᠤ ᠰᠢᠶᠠᠩ	Да дүн ёо шиян	150924211
Wuguquan Township	五股泉乡	Wǔgǔquán Xiāng	ᠡᠦ ᠭᠦ᠋ ᠴᠢᠦᠸᠠᠨ ᠰᠢᠶᠠᠩ	Үү хөө чиован шиян	150924212

== Climate ==
Climate data for Xinghe, elevation 1,267 m (4,157 ft), (1991–2020 normals, extremes 1981–2010)
Month	Jan	Feb	Mar	Apr	May	Jun	Jul	Aug	Sep	Oct	Nov	Dec	Year
Record high °C (°F)	8.9 (48.0)	15.9 (60.6)	22.1 (71.8)	30.6 (87.1)	33.9 (93.0)	37.3 (99.1)	37.0 (98.6)	34.3 (93.7)	34.3 (93.7)	25.9 (78.6)	19.2 (66.6)	11.9 (53.4)	37.3 (99.1)
Mean daily maximum °C (°F)	−5.2 (22.6)	−0.5 (31.1)	6.6 (43.9)	14.9 (58.8)	21.4 (70.5)	25.6 (78.1)	27.3 (81.1)	25.7 (78.3)	20.7 (69.3)	13.1 (55.6)	3.8 (38.8)	−3.6 (25.5)	12.5 (54.5)
Daily mean °C (°F)	−12.4 (9.7)	−8.2 (17.2)	−0.9 (30.4)	7.4 (45.3)	14.4 (57.9)	19.0 (66.2)	21.1 (70.0)	19.3 (66.7)	13.8 (56.8)	6.1 (43.0)	−3.0 (26.6)	−10.2 (13.6)	5.5 (42.0)
Mean daily minimum °C (°F)	−18.2 (−0.8)	−14.4 (6.1)	−7.5 (18.5)	0.2 (32.4)	7.1 (44.8)	12.4 (54.3)	15.4 (59.7)	13.7 (56.7)	7.7 (45.9)	0.3 (32.5)	−8.3 (17.1)	−15.4 (4.3)	−0.6 (31.0)
Record low °C (°F)	−33.5 (−28.3)	−28.2 (−18.8)	−23.8 (−10.8)	−13.5 (7.7)	−6.2 (20.8)	0.3 (32.5)	7.4 (45.3)	3.1 (37.6)	−4.6 (23.7)	−13.1 (8.4)	−28.3 (−18.9)	−30.7 (−23.3)	−33.5 (−28.3)
Average precipitation mm (inches)	2.3 (0.09)	3.2 (0.13)	7.0 (0.28)	17.9 (0.70)	32.2 (1.27)	63.3 (2.49)	97.1 (3.82)	74.1 (2.92)	50.5 (1.99)	22.3 (0.88)	7.6 (0.30)	2.4 (0.09)	379.9 (14.96)
Average precipitation days (≥ 0.1 mm)	2.9	3.3	4.2	5.0	7.7	12.2	13.4	11.6	9.5	5.4	4.1	2.6	81.9
Average snowy days	4.3	4.7	5.0	3.0	0.4	0	0	0	0.1	1.5	4.6	4.3	27.9
Average relative humidity (%)	56	50	43	39	40	53	65	67	61	55	56	55	53
Mean monthly sunshine hours	208.1	207.7	247.5	256.1	277.0	252.7	250.6	248.2	229.3	232.4	201.9	194.2	2,805.7
Percentage possible sunshine	70	68	66	64	62	56	55	59	62	69	69	68	64
Source: China Meteorological Administration
