= Qahar Right Front Banner =

Chahar Right Front Banner 察哈尔右翼前旗 • ᠴᠠᠬᠠᠷ ᠪᠠᠷᠠᠭᠤᠨ ᠭᠠᠷᠤᠨ ᠡᠮᠦᠨᠡᠳᠦ ᠬᠣᠰᠢᠭᠤ
- Banner
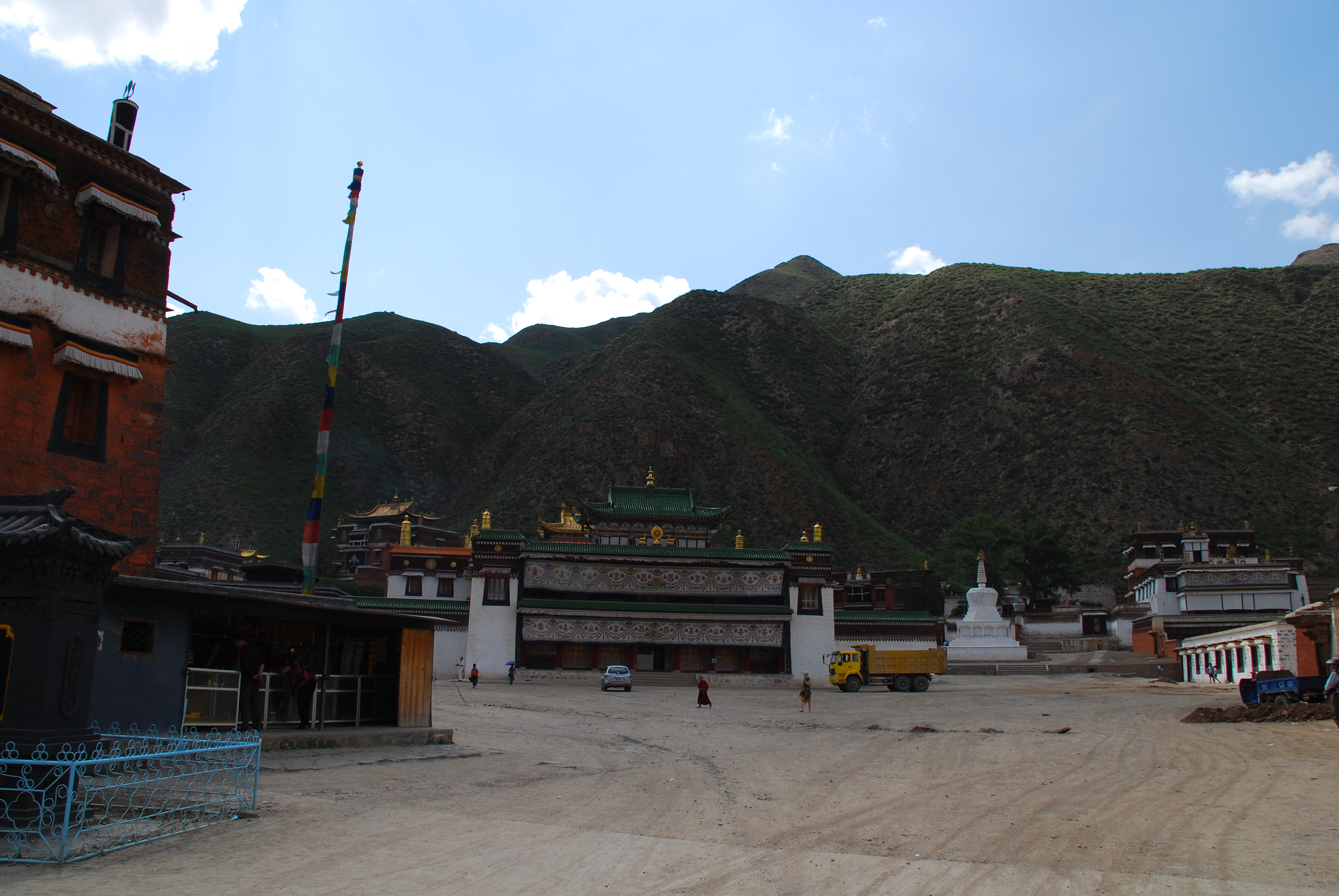

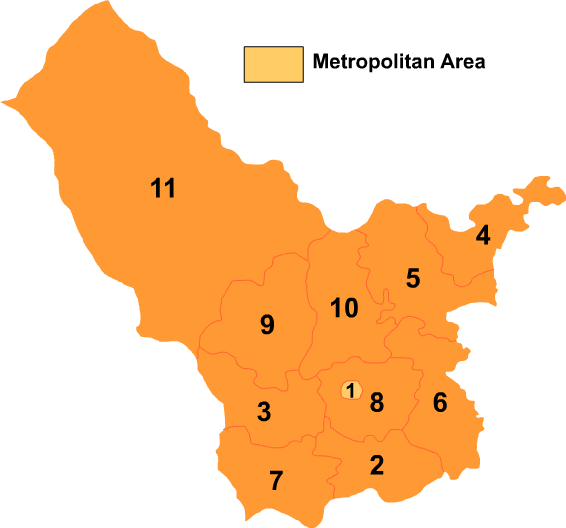
- Map of Ulanqab's divisions: Chahar Right Front Banner is 8 on this map

- Location in Inner Mongolia Chahar RFB (China)
- Coordinates: 40°47′N 113°13′E
- Country: China
- Autonomous region: Inner Mongolia
- Prefecture-level city: Ulanqab
- Banner seat: Tugin Ul

Area
  - Total: 2,734 km^{2} (1,056 sq mi)
- Elevation: 1,335 m (4,380 ft)

Population (2020)
  - Total: 125,172
  - Density: 45.78/km^{2} (118.6/sq mi)
- Time zone: UTC+8 (China Standard)
- Website: www.cyqq.gov.cn

Qahar Right Front Banner

Chinese name
- Simplified Chinese: 察哈尔右翼前旗
- Traditional Chinese: 察哈爾右翼前旗
Transcriptions
Standard Mandarin
- Hanyu Pinyin: Cháhā'ěr Yòuyì Qiánqí

Mongolian name
- Mongolian Cyrillic: Цахар баруун гарын өмнөд хошуу
- Mongolian script: ᠴᠠᠬᠠᠷ ᠪᠠᠷᠠᠭᠤᠨ ᠭᠠᠷᠤᠨ ᠡᠮᠦᠨᠡᠳᠦ ᠬᠣᠰᠢᠭᠤ
Transcriptions
- SASM/GNC: Čaqar Baraɣun Ɣarun Emünedü qosiɣu

Chahar Right Front Banner or Qahar Right Front Banner (Mongolian: ᠴᠠᠬᠠᠷ ᠪᠠᠷᠠᠭᠤᠨ ᠭᠠᠷᠤᠨ ᠡᠮᠦᠨᠡᠳᠦ ᠬᠣᠰᠢᠭᠤ; Chinese: 察哈尔右翼前旗) is a Banner of Inner Mongolia, China, surrounding Jining District and bordering Xinghe County to the east, Fengzhen City to the south, Zhuozi County to the west, and Chahar Right Back Banner to the north. Its territory includes Lake Huangqi. It is under the administration of Ulaan Chab City. Its most important settlement is Tugin Ul (Tuguiwula), where Tuguiwula railway station is located.

== Administrative divisions ==
Qahar Right Front Banner is made up of 5 towns and 4 townships.

Name	Simplified Chinese	Hanyu Pinyin	Mongolian (Hudum Script)	Mongolian (Cyrillic)	Administrative division code
Towns
Tugin Ul Town	土贵乌拉镇	Tǔguìwūlā Zhèn	ᠲᠤᠭ ᠤᠨ ᠠᠭᠤᠯᠠ ᠪᠠᠯᠭᠠᠰᠤ	Догийн уул балгас	150926105
Pingdiquan Town	平地泉镇	Píngdìquán Zhèn	ᠫᠢᠩ ᠳ᠋ᠢ ᠴᠢᠦᠸᠠᠨ ᠪᠠᠯᠭᠠᠰᠤ	Пин ди чиован балгас	150926106
Meiguiying Town	玫瑰营镇	Méiguīyíng Zhèn			150926107
Bayan Tal Town	巴音塔拉镇	Bāyīntǎlā Zhèn	ᠪᠠᠶᠠᠨᠲᠠᠯ᠎ᠠ ᠪᠠᠯᠭᠠᠰᠤ	Баянтөл балгас	150926108
Hihir Nur Town	黄旗海镇	Huángqíhǎi Zhèn	ᠬᠢᠬᠢᠷ ᠨᠠᠭᠤᠷ ᠪᠠᠯᠭᠠᠰᠤ	Хийр нуур балгас	150926109
Townships
Ulan Ul Township	乌拉哈乌拉乡	Wūlāhāwūlā Xiāng	ᠤᠯᠠᠭᠠᠨ᠌ᠠ᠋ᠭᠠᠤᠯᠠ ᠰᠢᠶᠠᠩ	Улаангуул шиян	150926209
Huangmaoying Township	黄茂营乡	Huángmàoyíng Xiāng	ᠬᠤᠸᠠᠩ ᠮᠣᠤ ᠶᠢᠩ ᠰᠢᠶᠠᠩ	Хуан муу ин шиян	150926210
Sanchakou Township	三岔口乡	Sānchàkǒu Xiāng	ᠰᠠᠨ ᠴᠠ ᠺᠧᠦ ᠰᠢᠶᠠᠩ	Сан ца кев шиян	150926211
Laoquangou Township	老圈沟乡	Lǎoquāngōu Xiāng	ᠯᠣᠤ ᠴᠢᠦᠸᠠᠨ ᠭᠧᠦ ᠰᠢᠶᠠᠩ	Луу чиован гүү шиян	150926212

Other: Ulanqab Beijing-Inner Mongolia Cooperative Industrial Development Zone (内蒙古乌兰察布京蒙合作产业开发区)

== Climate ==
Climate data for Chahar Right Front Banner, elevation 1,284 m (4,213 ft), (1991–2020 normals, extremes 1981–2010)
Month	Jan	Feb	Mar	Apr	May	Jun	Jul	Aug	Sep	Oct	Nov	Dec	Year
Record high °C (°F)	8.6 (47.5)	15.5 (59.9)	21.5 (70.7)	32.3 (90.1)	33.5 (92.3)	36.4 (97.5)	37.3 (99.1)	33.2 (91.8)	33.9 (93.0)	25.6 (78.1)	18.0 (64.4)	11.5 (52.7)	37.3 (99.1)
Mean daily maximum °C (°F)	−5.1 (22.8)	−0.3 (31.5)	6.7 (44.1)	15.0 (59.0)	21.3 (70.3)	25.6 (78.1)	27.1 (80.8)	25.5 (77.9)	20.6 (69.1)	13.2 (55.8)	3.9 (39.0)	−3.5 (25.7)	12.5 (54.5)
Daily mean °C (°F)	−12.0 (10.4)	−7.6 (18.3)	−0.4 (31.3)	7.8 (46.0)	14.6 (58.3)	19.2 (66.6)	21.2 (70.2)	19.4 (66.9)	13.9 (57.0)	6.4 (43.5)	−2.5 (27.5)	−9.8 (14.4)	5.9 (42.5)
Mean daily minimum °C (°F)	−17.5 (0.5)	−13.5 (7.7)	−6.7 (19.9)	1.0 (33.8)	7.6 (45.7)	12.8 (55.0)	15.6 (60.1)	13.7 (56.7)	7.9 (46.2)	0.5 (32.9)	−7.6 (18.3)	−14.7 (5.5)	−0.1 (31.9)
Record low °C (°F)	−28.3 (−18.9)	−27.2 (−17.0)	−23.0 (−9.4)	−12.7 (9.1)	−5.4 (22.3)	0.7 (33.3)	8.3 (46.9)	4.1 (39.4)	−3.2 (26.2)	−12.5 (9.5)	−27.2 (−17.0)	−30.2 (−22.4)	−30.2 (−22.4)
Average precipitation mm (inches)	1.4 (0.06)	2.7 (0.11)	6.7 (0.26)	19.6 (0.77)	32.9 (1.30)	56.2 (2.21)	109.9 (4.33)	74.7 (2.94)	47.6 (1.87)	20.4 (0.80)	7.6 (0.30)	1.9 (0.07)	381.6 (15.02)
Average precipitation days (≥ 0.1 mm)	2	2.3	3.3	4.2	6.9	11.4	13.7	10.9	9.2	5.2	3.3	2.3	74.7
Average snowy days	3.4	3.8	4.6	2.7	0.3	0	0	0	0.1	1.1	3.7	3.4	23.1
Average relative humidity (%)	53	46	38	36	38	49	62	65	59	54	52	52	50
Mean monthly sunshine hours	195.3	205.2	246.5	263.0	284.1	262.7	262.8	261.2	237.0	237.3	199.2	185.8	2,840.1
Percentage possible sunshine	65	68	66	66	63	58	58	62	64	70	68	65	64
Source: China Meteorological Administration
