= Datong South railway station =

Railway station in Datong, Shanxi, China

Datongnan 大同南站
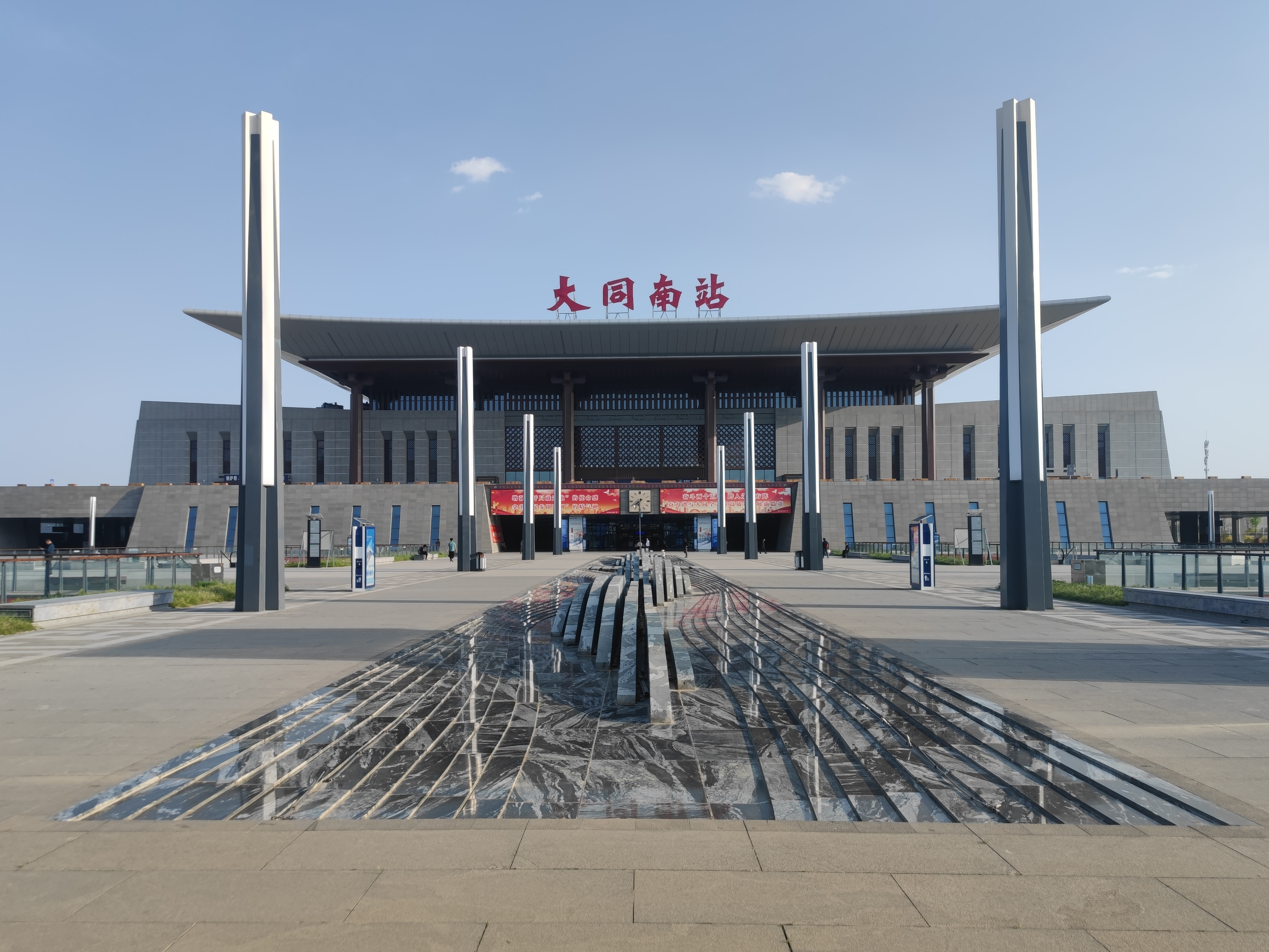

General information
- Location: Pingcheng District, Datong, Shanxi; China
- Coordinates: 40.043252°N 113.358014°E
- System: Passenger station
- Owner: China Railway Taiyuan Group
- Lines: Datong–Xi'an high-speed railway; Datong–Zhangjiakou high-speed railway
- Platforms: 4
- Tracks: 9

History
- Opened: 30 December 2019; 6 years ago
Location

Datongnan (Datong South) railway station (Note: Chinese: 大同南站; pinyin: Dàtóng Nánzhàn) is a railway station of Datong–Xi'an high-speed railway and Datong–Zhangjiakou high-speed railway, located in Shuibosi township, Pingcheng District, Datong, Shanxi, China, opening on 30 December 2019.

The station has a capacity of 3000 passengers at the same time and serves a maximum of 3288 people per hour. The area of the station is 39,990 square metres (430,400 sq ft), and there are 4 platforms and 9 tracks in this station.

== Notes ==
| Preceding station | China Railway High-speed | Following station |
|---|---|---|
| Terminus | Datong–Xi'an high-speed railway | Huairen East towards Xi'an North |
| Terminus | Datong–Zhangjiakou high-speed railway | Yanggao South towards Zhangjiakou (opened in 1957) |
