= Fengzhen =

Fengzhen 丰镇市 • ᠹᠸᠩᠵᠸᠡ ᠬᠣᠲᠠ Fengchen
- County-level city
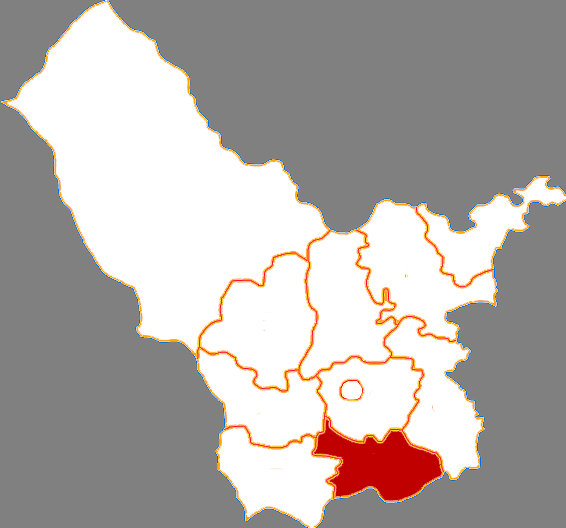
- Fengzhen in Ulanqab

- Location in Inner Mongolia Fengzhen (China)
- Coordinates: 40°26′13″N 113°06′36″E
- Country: China
- Autonomous region: Inner Mongolia
- Prefecture-level city: Ulanqab
- Municipal seat: Beichengqu Subdistrict

Area
  - County-level city: 2,704.0 km^{2} (1,044.0 sq mi)
  - Urban: 25.00 km^{2} (9.65 sq mi)

Population (2020)
  - County-level city: 195,229
  - Density: 72.200/km^{2} (187.00/sq mi)
  - Urban: 137,900
- Time zone: UTC+8 (China Standard)
- Postal code: 012100
- Area code: 0474
- Website: www.fengzhen.gov.cn

Fengzhen

Chinese name
- Simplified Chinese: 丰镇市
- Traditional Chinese: 豐鎮市
Transcriptions
Standard Mandarin
- Hanyu Pinyin: Fēngzhèn Shì

Mongolian name
- Mongolian Cyrillic: Фенжень хот
- Mongolian script: ᠹᠸᠩᠵᠸᠡ ᠬᠣᠲᠠ

Fengzhen (Mongolian: ᠹᠸᠩᠵᠸᠡ ᠬᠣᠲᠠ; Chinese: 丰镇) is a county-level city under the administration of the prefecture-level city of Ulaan Chab, in the central portion of Inner Mongolia, China, bordering Shanxi province to the south.

Fengzhen is about 200 km (120 mi) from Hohhot, the capital of Inner Mongolia.

== Administrative divisions ==
Fengzhen is divided into 5 subdistricts, 5 towns, and 3 townships.

Name	Simplified Chinese	Hanyu Pinyin	Mongolian (Hudum Script)	Mongolian (Cyrillic)	Administrative division code
Subdistricts
Xinchengqu Subdistrict	新城区街道	Xīnchéngqū Jiēdào	ᠰᠢᠨ᠎ᠡ ᠬᠣᠲᠠ ᠲᠣᠭᠣᠷᠢᠭ ᠤᠨ ᠵᠡᠭᠡᠯᠢ ᠭᠤᠳᠤᠮᠵᠢ	Шинэ хот дугаргийн зээл гудамж	150981005
Jiuchengqu Subdistrict	旧城区街道	Jiùchéngqū Jiēdào	ᠬᠠᠭᠤᠴᠢᠨ ᠬᠣᠲᠠ ᠲᠣᠭᠣᠷᠢᠭ ᠤᠨ ᠵᠡᠭᠡᠯᠢ ᠭᠤᠳᠤᠮᠵᠢ	Хуучин хот дугаргийн зээл гудамж	150981006
Beichengqu Subdistrict	北城区街道	Běichéngqū Jiēdào	ᠬᠣᠲᠠ ᠶᠢᠨ ᠬᠣᠢᠲᠤ ᠲᠣᠭᠣᠷᠢᠭ ᠤᠨ ᠵᠡᠭᠡᠯᠢ ᠭᠤᠳᠤᠮᠵᠢ	Хотын хойт дугаргийн зээл гудамж	150981007
Gongyequ Subdistrict	工业区街道	Gōngyèqū Jiēdào	ᠠᠵᠤ ᠦᠢᠯᠡᠳᠪᠦᠷᠢ ᠶᠢᠨ ᠲᠣᠭᠣᠷᠢᠭ ᠤᠨ ᠵᠡᠭᠡᠯᠢ ᠭᠤᠳᠤᠮᠵᠢ	Аж үйлдвэрийн дугаргийн зээл гудамж	150981008
Nanchengqu Subdistrict	南城区街道	Nánchéngqū Jiēdào	ᠬᠣᠲᠠ ᠶᠢᠨ ᠡᠮᠦᠨ᠎ᠡ ᠲᠣᠭᠣᠷᠢᠭ ᠤᠨ ᠵᠡᠭᠡᠯᠢ ᠭᠤᠳᠤᠮᠵᠢ	Хотын өмнө дугаргийн зээл гудамж	150981009
Towns
Longshengzhuang Town	隆盛庄镇	Lóngshèngzhuāng Zhèn	ᠯᠦᠩ ᠱᠧᠩ ᠵᠤᠸᠠᠩ ᠪᠠᠯᠭᠠᠰᠤ	Лүн шен зуван балгас	150981107
Heitutai Town	黑土台镇	Hēitǔtái Zhèn	ᠾᠧᠢ ᠲᠤ ᠲᠠᠢ ᠪᠠᠯᠭᠠᠰᠤ	Гейдтэй балгас	150981108
Hongshaba Town	红砂坝镇	Hóngshābà Zhèn	ᠬᠤᠩ ᠱᠠ ᠪᠠ ᠪᠠᠯᠭᠠᠰᠤ	Хон шаа ба балгас	150981109
Jubaozhuang Town	巨宝庄镇	Jùbǎozhuāng Zhèn	ᠵᠢᠦᠢ ᠪᠣᠣ ᠵᠤᠸᠠᠩ ᠪᠠᠯᠭᠠᠰᠤ	Жууй буу зуван балгас	150981110
Sanyiquan Town	三义泉镇	Sānyìquán Zhèn	ᠰᠠᠨ ᠢ ᠴᠢᠦᠸᠠᠨ ᠪᠠᠯᠭᠠᠰᠤ	Сан И чиован балгас	150981111
Townships
Hunyuanyao Township	浑源窑乡	Húnyuányáo Xiāng	ᠬᠤᠨ ᠶᠤᠸᠠᠨ ᠶᠣᠤ ᠰᠢᠶᠠᠩ	Хун юан ёо шиян	150981207
Yuanshanzi Township	元山子乡	Yuánshānzi Xiāng	ᠶᠤᠸᠠᠨ ᠱᠠᠨ ᠽᠢ ᠰᠢᠶᠠᠩ	Юан шин зи шиян	150981208
Guantunbao Township	官屯堡乡	Guāntúnbǎo Xiāng	ᠭᠤᠸᠠᠨ ᠲᠦᠨ ᠪᠣᠣ ᠰᠢᠶᠠᠩ	Гуан түн буу шиян	150981209

Other: Fengchuan Circular Economy Development Zone Management Committee (丰川循环经济开发区管理委员会)

== Climate ==
Climate data for Fengzhen, elevation 1,192 m (3,911 ft), (1991–2020 normals, extremes 1981–2010)
Month	Jan	Feb	Mar	Apr	May	Jun	Jul	Aug	Sep	Oct	Nov	Dec	Year
Record high °C (°F)	8.0 (46.4)	18.2 (64.8)	23.1 (73.6)	30.8 (87.4)	32.6 (90.7)	37.9 (100.2)	39.4 (102.9)	33.7 (92.7)	33.5 (92.3)	25.2 (77.4)	19.5 (67.1)	13.5 (56.3)	39.4 (102.9)
Mean daily maximum °C (°F)	−4.2 (24.4)	0.8 (33.4)	7.9 (46.2)	16.0 (60.8)	22.3 (72.1)	26.6 (79.9)	28.0 (82.4)	26.3 (79.3)	21.4 (70.5)	14.2 (57.6)	5.0 (41.0)	−2.5 (27.5)	13.5 (56.3)
Daily mean °C (°F)	−12.5 (9.5)	−7.7 (18.1)	−0.1 (31.8)	8.0 (46.4)	15.0 (59.0)	19.7 (67.5)	21.6 (70.9)	19.8 (67.6)	14.0 (57.2)	6.4 (43.5)	−2.6 (27.3)	−10.1 (13.8)	6.0 (42.7)
Mean daily minimum °C (°F)	−19.1 (−2.4)	−14.6 (5.7)	−7.1 (19.2)	−0.3 (31.5)	7.0 (44.6)	12.5 (54.5)	15.5 (59.9)	13.7 (56.7)	7.7 (45.9)	−0.2 (31.6)	−8.3 (17.1)	−16.0 (3.2)	−0.8 (30.6)
Record low °C (°F)	−34.4 (−29.9)	−31.1 (−24.0)	−22.0 (−7.6)	−10.8 (12.6)	−4.4 (24.1)	3.1 (37.6)	7.4 (45.3)	4.8 (40.6)	−1.3 (29.7)	−10.5 (13.1)	−23.7 (−10.7)	−33.2 (−27.8)	−34.4 (−29.9)
Average precipitation mm (inches)	1.6 (0.06)	3.4 (0.13)	6.8 (0.27)	19.7 (0.78)	35.6 (1.40)	51.5 (2.03)	115.9 (4.56)	77.2 (3.04)	52.8 (2.08)	23.9 (0.94)	7.9 (0.31)	1.7 (0.07)	398 (15.67)
Average precipitation days (≥ 0.1 mm)	1.9	2.6	3.7	4.5	7.1	10.8	13.5	11.6	9.8	5.8	3.3	2.0	76.6
Average snowy days	3.6	4.2	4.6	2.1	0.1	0	0	0	0	0.7	3.9	3.6	22.8
Average relative humidity (%)	56	50	44	40	41	54	64	67	63	59	58	56	54
Mean monthly sunshine hours	200.4	201.9	243.9	259.7	282.3	264.5	259.5	256.4	232.4	231.5	196.4	188.2	2,817.1
Percentage possible sunshine	67	67	65	65	63	59	57	61	63	68	67	65	64
Source: China Meteorological Administration

== Transportation ==
- China National Highway 208
