= Ulanqab =

City in Inner Mongolia, China

Ulanqab 乌兰察布市 • ᠤᠯᠠᠭᠠᠨᠴᠠᠪ ᠬᠣᠲᠠ
- Prefecture-level city
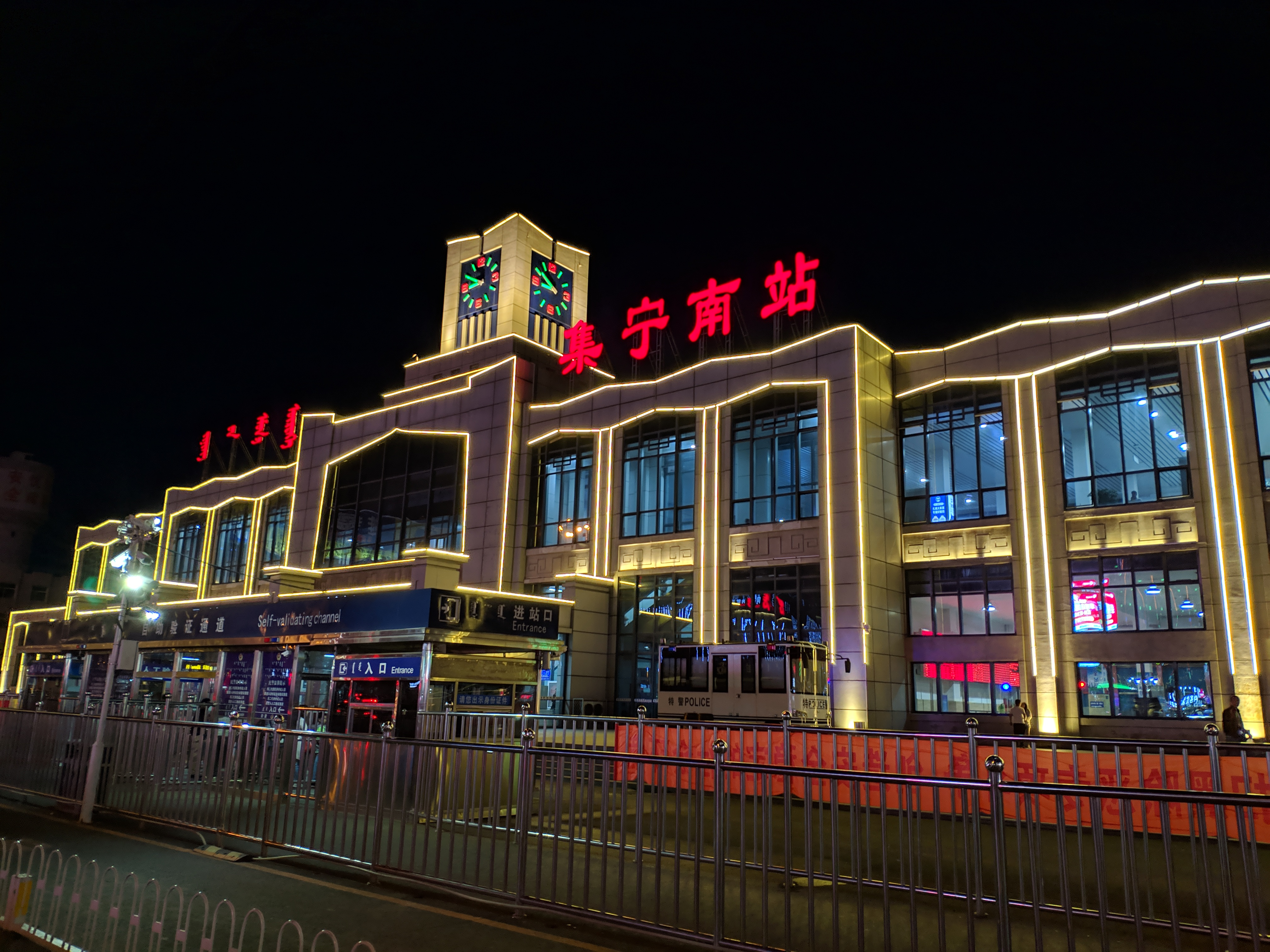
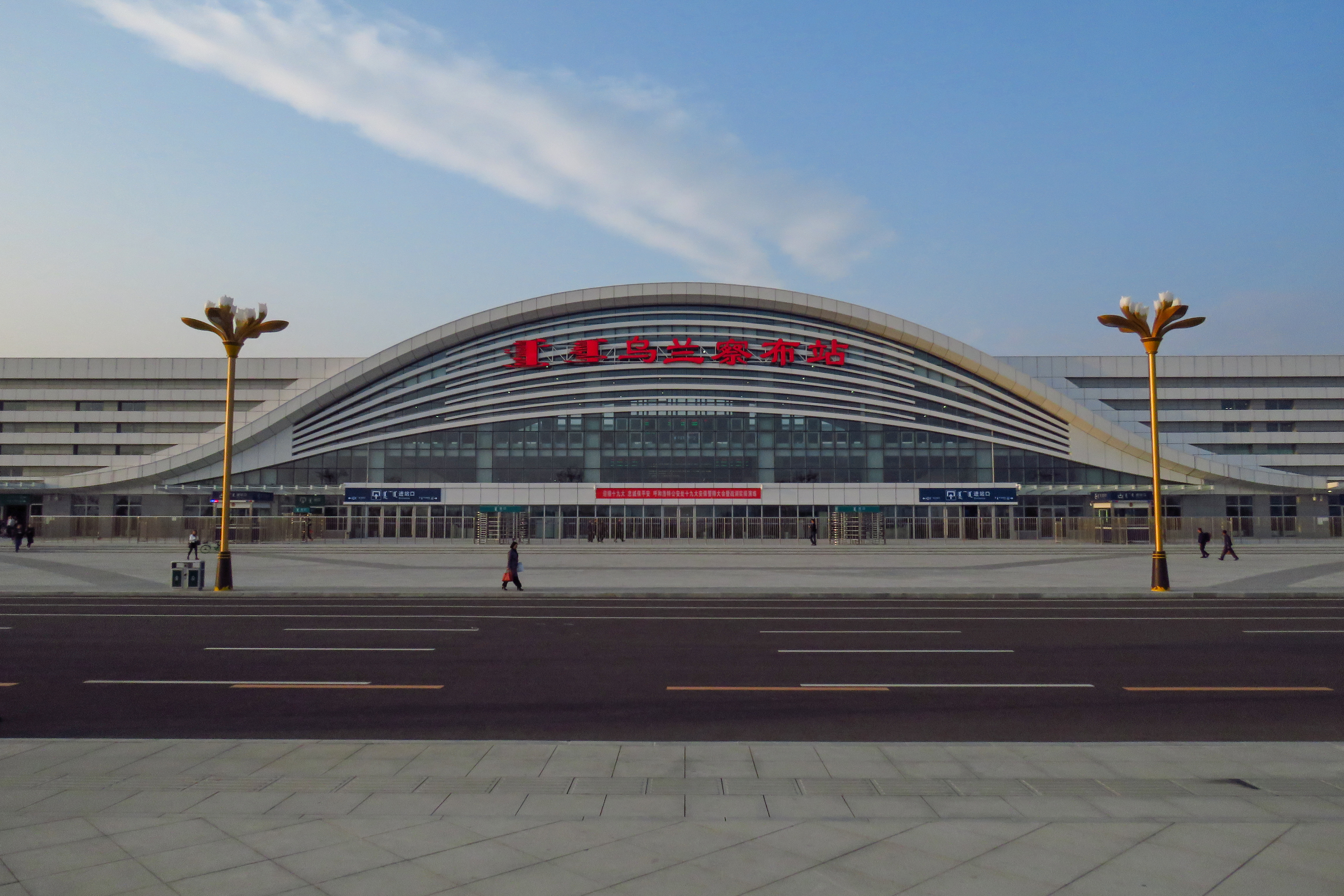
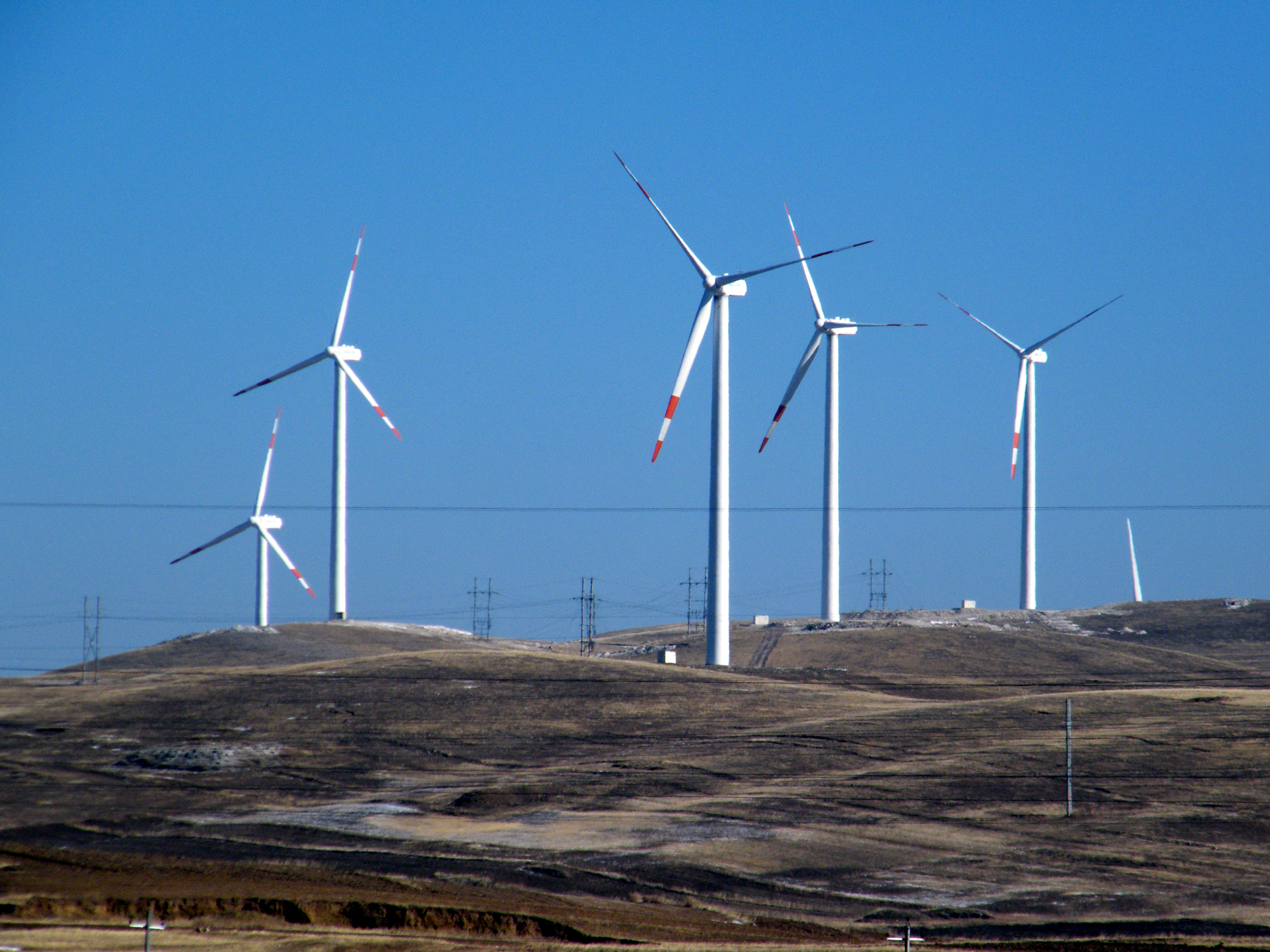
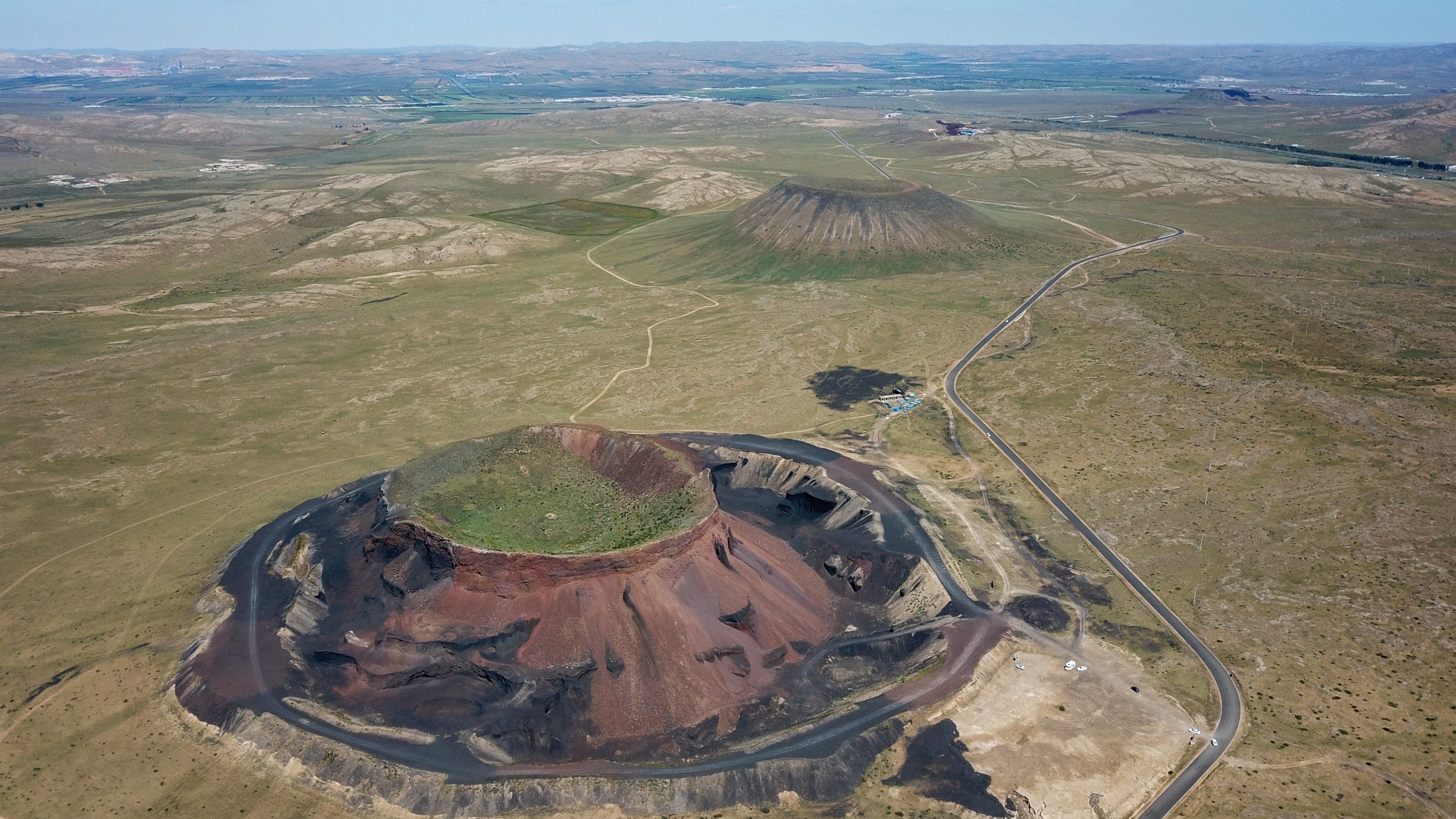
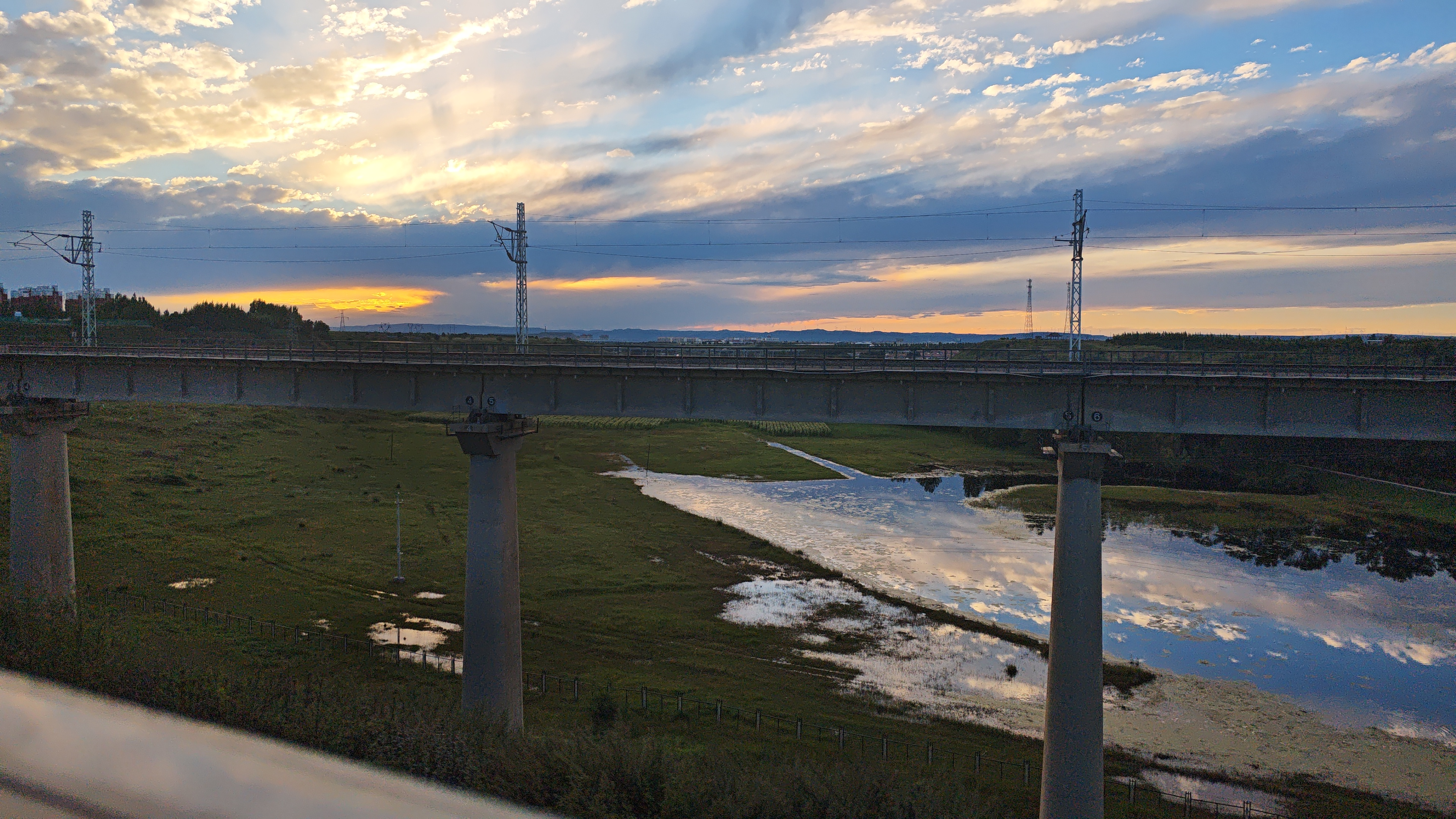
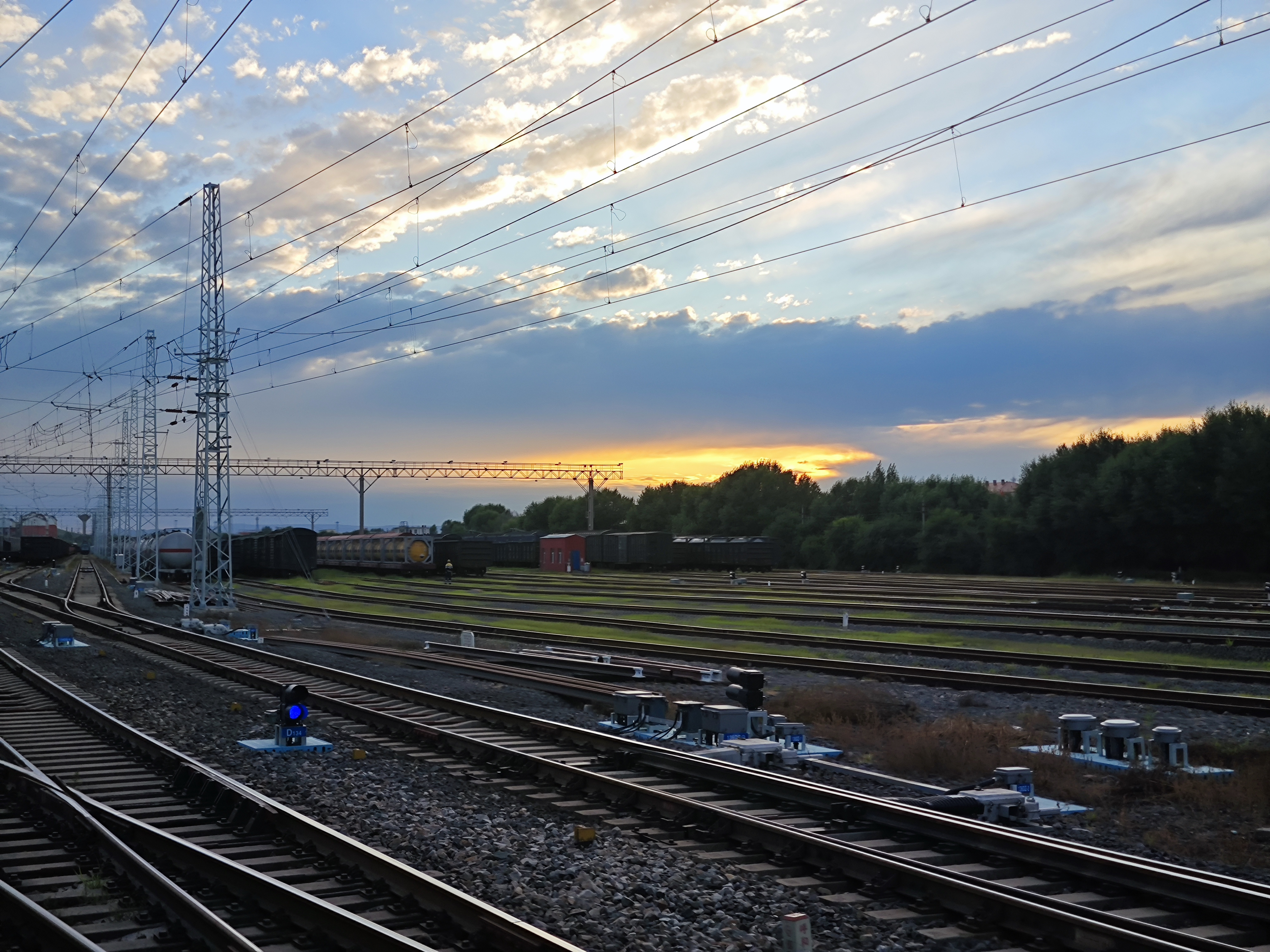
- Jining South railway station Ulanqab railway station Huitengxile Grassland in northern Ulanqab Chahar Volcanic Group Jining District - Erenhotrailway Jining railway station east

- Location of Ulanqab City jurisdiction in Inner Mongolia

- Location of the city centre in Inner Mongolia
- Coordinates (Ulanqab government): 40°59′38″N 113°07′55″E
- Country: People's Republic of China
- Autonomous region: Inner Mongolia
- Municipal seat: Jining District

Area
  - Prefecture-level city: 54,473.6 km^{2} (21,032.4 sq mi)
  - Urban (2017): 521.6 km^{2} (201.4 sq mi)
  - Metro: 2,965.6 km^{2} (1,145.0 sq mi)
- Elevation: 1,378 m (4,521 ft)

Population (2020 census)
  - Prefecture-level city: 1,706,328
  - Density: 31.3239/km^{2} (81.1286/sq mi)
  - Urban: 425,059
  - Urban density: 814.9/km^{2} (2,111/sq mi)
  - Metro: 550,231
  - Metro density: 185.54/km^{2} (480.54/sq mi)

GDP
  - Prefecture-level city: CN¥ 91.4 billion US$ 14.7 billion
  - Per capita: CN¥ 43,221; US$ 6,939
- Time zone: UTC+8 (China Standard)
- Postal code: 012000
- Area code: (0)474
- ISO 3166 code: CN-NM-09
- Licence Plate Prefix: 蒙J
- Website: wulanchabu.gov.cn

Ulanqab

Chinese name
- Simplified Chinese: 乌兰察布
- Traditional Chinese: 烏蘭察布
Transcriptions
Standard Mandarin
- Hanyu Pinyin: Wūlánchábù

Mongolian name
- Mongolian Cyrillic: Улаанцав хот
- Mongolian script: ᠤᠯᠠᠭᠠᠨᠴᠠᠪ ᠬᠣᠲᠠ
Transcriptions
- SASM/GNC: Ulaɣančab qota

Ulanqab or Ulan Chab (Chinese: 乌兰察布; pinyin: Wūlánchábù; Mongolian: ᠤᠯᠠᠭᠠᠨᠴᠠᠪUlaɣančab qota; Mongolian Cyrillic: Улаанцав хот) is a region administered as a prefecture-level city in south-central Inner Mongolia, China. Its administrative centre is in Jining District, which was formerly a county-level city. It was established as a prefecture-level city on 1 December 2003, formed from the former Ulanqab League. The Ulanqab Stadium is located in the city.

Ulaan Chab city has an area of 54,473.6 square kilometres (21,032.4 sq mi). It borders Hohhot to the west, Mongolia to the north, Xilin Gol League to the northeast, Hebei to the east and Shanxi to the south. As of the 2020 census, its total population was, 1,706,328 inhabitants (2,143,590 in 2010) whom 550,231 inhabitants lived in the built-up (or metro) area made of Jining District and Qahar Right Front Banner largely conurbated in its northern part.

The western part of Ulaan Chab used to be part of the now-defunct Chinese province of Suiyuan.

Ulanqab is known as the "Potato Capital of China" due to its well-developed potato cultivation and processing industries. In recent years, the Chinese government has invested heavily in the construction of AI data centers in Ulanqab, making it a key city in China’s green energy AI infrastructure project strategy.

== Administrative subdivisions ==
Ulaan Chab has eleven administrative divisions: one district, one county-level city, five counties and four banners:

Map
Name	Mongolian	Hanzi	Hanyu Pinyin	Population (2010 est.)	Area (km^{2})	Density (/km^{2})
Jining District	ᠵᠢᠨᠢᠩ ᠲᠣᠭᠣᠷᠢᠭ (Jiniŋ toɣoriɣ)	集宁区	Jíníng Qū	356,135	418	851
Fengzhen city	ᠹᠧᠩᠵᠧᠨ ᠬᠣᠲᠠ (Fėŋjėn qota)	丰镇市	Fēngzhèn Shì	245,608	2,704	90
Zhuozi County	ᠵᠦᠸᠧᠽᠢ ᠰᠢᠶᠠᠨ (Jüvėǳi siyan)	卓资县	Zhuózī Xiàn	136,965	3,119	43
Huade County	ᠬᠤᠸᠠᠳᠧ ᠰᠢᠶᠠᠨ (Quvadė siyan)	化德县	Huàdé Xiàn	123,535	2,527	48
Shangdu County	ᠬᠤᠸᠠᠳᠧ ᠰᠢᠶᠠᠨ (Šaŋdu siyan)	商都县	Shāngdū Xiàn	234,417	4,304	54
Xinghe County	ᠰᠢᠩᠾᠧ ᠰᠢᠶᠠᠨ (Siŋhė siyan)	兴和县	Xīnghé Xiàn	220,067	3,519	62
Liangcheng County	ᠯᠢᠶᠠᠩᠴᠠᠩ ᠰᠢᠶᠠᠨ (Liyaŋčaŋ siyan)	凉城县	Liángchéng Xiàn	185,954	3,451	53
Qahar Right Front Banner (Qahar Barun Garun Omnod Banner)	ᠴᠠᠬᠠᠷ ᠪᠠᠷᠠᠭᠤᠨ ᠭᠠᠷᠤᠨ ᠡᠮᠦᠨᠡᠳᠦ ᠬᠣᠰᠢᠭᠤ (Čaqar Baraɣun Ɣarun Emünedü qosiɣu)	察哈尔右翼前旗	Cháhā'ěr Yòuyì Qián Qí	164,434	2,734	60
Qahar Right Middle Banner (Qahar Barun Garun Dundad Banner)	ᠴᠠᠬᠠᠷ ᠪᠠᠷᠠᠭᠤᠨ ᠭᠠᠷᠤᠨ ᠳᠤᠮᠳᠠᠳᠤ ᠬᠣᠰᠢᠭᠤ (Čaqar Baraɣun Ɣarun Dumdadu qosiɣu)	察哈尔右翼中旗	Cháhā'ěr Yòuyì Zhōng Qí	149,483	4,200	35
Qahar Right Rear Banner (Qahar Barun Garun Hoit Banner)	ᠴᠠᠬᠠᠷ ᠪᠠᠷᠠᠭᠤᠨ ᠭᠠᠷᠤᠨ ᠬᠣᠶᠢᠲᠤ ᠬᠣᠰᠢᠭᠤ (Čaqar Baraɣun Ɣarun Qoyitu qosiɣu)	察哈尔右翼后旗	Cháhā'ěr Yòuyì Hòu Qí	150,174	3,803	39
Dorbod Banner	ᠳᠥᠷᠪᠡᠳ ᠬᠣᠰᠢᠭᠤ (Dörbed qosiɣu)	四子王旗	Sìzǐwáng Qí	176,818	24,016	7

== Geography and climate ==
Ulanqab features a cold semi-arid climate (Köppen BSk), marked by long, cold and very dry winters, warm, somewhat humid summers, and strong winds, especially in spring. More than half of the annual precipitation of around 340 millimetres (13.4 in) falls in July and August alone.

Climate data for Ulanqab (Jining District), elevation 1,420 m (4,660 ft), 1991–2020 normals, extremes 1971–2010)
Month	Jan	Feb	Mar	Apr	May	Jun	Jul	Aug	Sep	Oct	Nov	Dec	Year
Record high °C (°F)	8.6 (47.5)	13.5 (56.3)	21.7 (71.1)	30.1 (86.2)	31.9 (89.4)	35.4 (95.7)	35.5 (95.9)	32.5 (90.5)	32.4 (90.3)	24.6 (76.3)	18.3 (64.9)	8.8 (47.8)	35.5 (95.9)
Mean daily maximum °C (°F)	−5.6 (21.9)	−1.1 (30.0)	5.7 (42.3)	14.0 (57.2)	20.3 (68.5)	24.7 (76.5)	26.4 (79.5)	24.8 (76.6)	19.8 (67.6)	12.4 (54.3)	3.1 (37.6)	−4.2 (24.4)	11.7 (53.0)
Daily mean °C (°F)	−12.5 (9.5)	−8.3 (17.1)	−1.3 (29.7)	7.0 (44.6)	13.7 (56.7)	18.4 (65.1)	20.5 (68.9)	18.7 (65.7)	13.0 (55.4)	5.5 (41.9)	−3.4 (25.9)	−10.5 (13.1)	5.1 (41.1)
Mean daily minimum °C (°F)	−17.7 (0.1)	−14.0 (6.8)	−7.5 (18.5)	0.2 (32.4)	6.7 (44.1)	11.8 (53.2)	14.7 (58.5)	12.8 (55.0)	6.9 (44.4)	−0.3 (31.5)	−8.3 (17.1)	−15.2 (4.6)	−0.8 (30.5)
Record low °C (°F)	−32.4 (−26.3)	−30.6 (−23.1)	−24.3 (−11.7)	−14.5 (5.9)	−6.0 (21.2)	−0.1 (31.8)	6.9 (44.4)	0.0 (32.0)	−6.5 (20.3)	−14.5 (5.9)	−27.8 (−18.0)	−31.6 (−24.9)	−32.4 (−26.3)
Average precipitation mm (inches)	1.6 (0.06)	2.3 (0.09)	6.6 (0.26)	16.3 (0.64)	31.7 (1.25)	51.6 (2.03)	109.3 (4.30)	69.4 (2.73)	44.9 (1.77)	18.9 (0.74)	6.4 (0.25)	1.7 (0.07)	360.7 (14.19)
Average precipitation days (≥ 0.1 mm)	2.0	2.3	3.7	4.5	7.0	11.7	13.3	11.1	9.1	5.1	2.7	1.9	74.4
Average snowy days	3.3	4.4	5.3	3.4	0.4	0	0	0	0.1	1.9	4.4	3.9	27.1
Average relative humidity (%)	55	48	41	36	38	49	61	62	58	53	55	55	51
Mean monthly sunshine hours	206.7	212.1	252.2	264.7	278.8	255.7	250.9	250.8	230.2	235.9	201.8	195.7	2,835.5
Percentage possible sunshine	69	70	68	66	62	57	55	59	62	70	69	69	65
Source 1: China Meteorological Administration
Source 2: Weather China

== Demographics ==
In the 2000 census, there were 2,284,414 inhabitants:

Ethnic group	no. of inhabitants	share
Han	2,203,345	96.45%
Mongols	60,064	2.63%
Manchu	11,792	0.52%
Hui	7,683	0.34%
Koreans	198	0.01%
Tujia	185	0.01%
Miao	175	0.01%
Other	972	0.04%

== Transport ==
Ulanqab's transportation network is well-developed, connected by several railways and highways. Some of the railways the pass through the prefecture are the Beijing−Baotou, Jining−Erlianhot, and the Jining−Tongliao Railways. Major inter-provincial roads include the G6 Beijing–Lhasa Expressway (京藏高速), China National Highway 110 (Beijing to Yinchuan, Ningxia) and 208 (Erlianhot, Inner Mongolia to Changzhi, Shanxi). The city is also served by Ulanqab Jining Airport.

== Known people from Ulanqab ==
- He Pingping (1988–2010) was the smallest walking man standing at just 73 cm (29 in)
- Guo Shuqing, banker, politician, Governor of Shandong
