= Zhuozi County =

Zhuozi County 卓资县 · ᠵᠦᠸᠧᠽᠢ ᠰᠢᠶᠠᠨ Chotze
- County
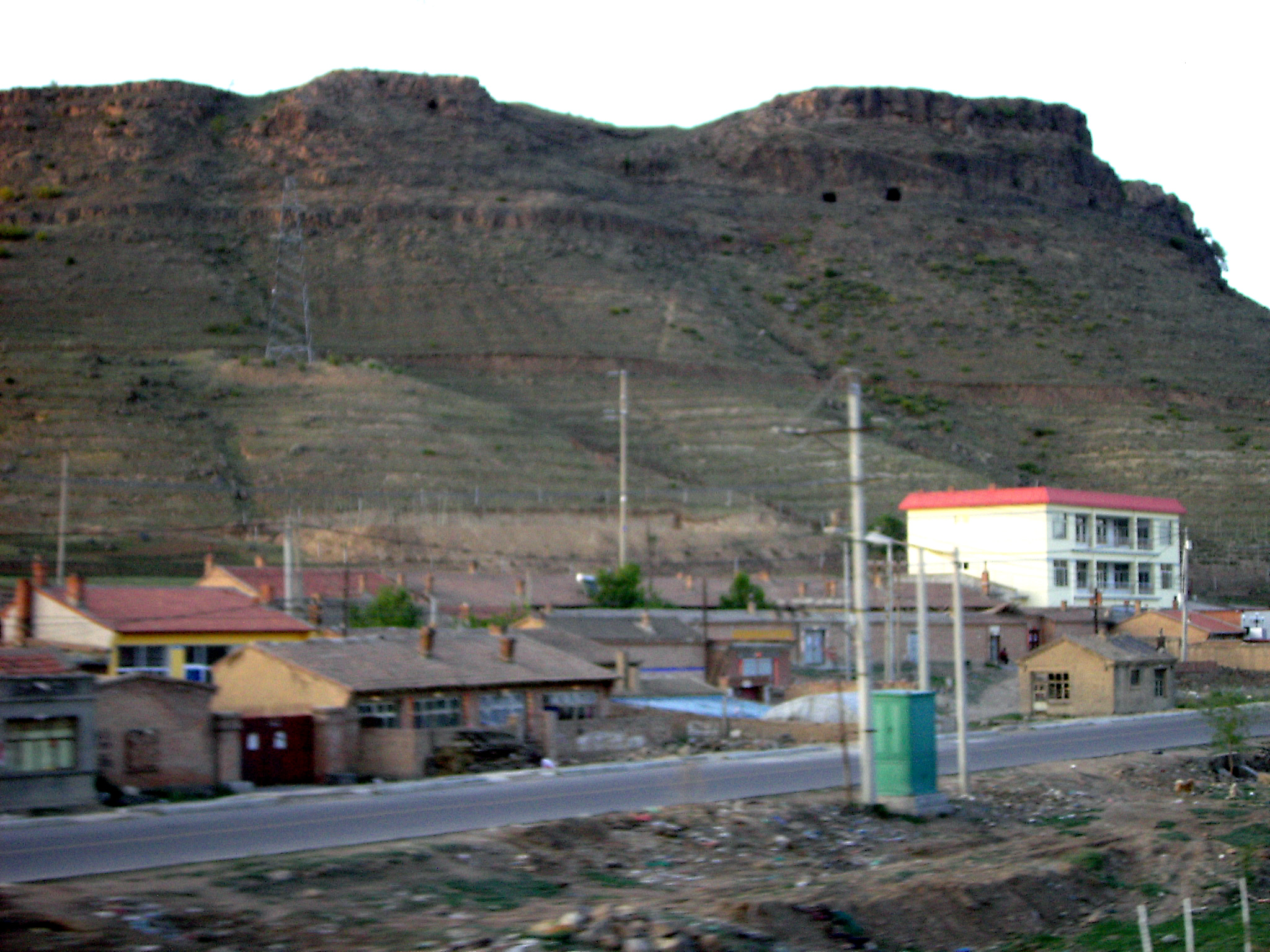

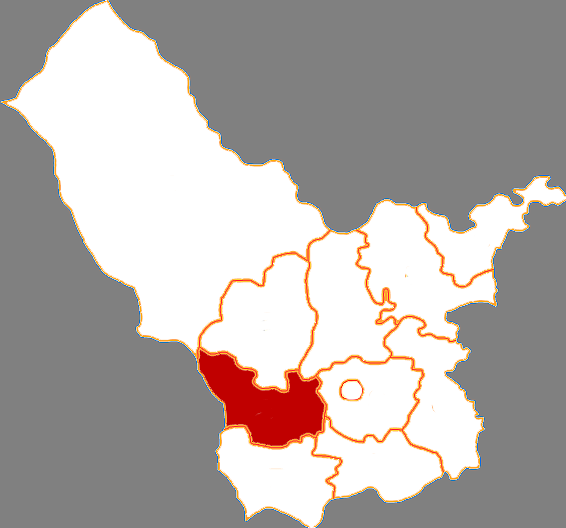
- Zhuozi in Ulanqab

- Location within Inner Mongolia Location within China
- Coordinates: 40°53′41″N 112°34′39″E
- Country: China
- Autonomous region: Inner Mongolia
- Prefecture-level city: Ulanqab
- County seat: Zhuozishan

Area
  - Total: 3,122 km^{2} (1,205 sq mi)

Population (2020)
  - Total: 85,648
  - Density: 27.43/km^{2} (71.05/sq mi)
- Time zone: UTC+8 (China Standard)
- Website: www.zhuozi.gov.cn

Zhuozi County

Chinese name
- Simplified Chinese: 卓资县
- Traditional Chinese: 卓資縣
Transcriptions
Standard Mandarin
- Hanyu Pinyin: Zhuōzī Xiàn

Mongolian name
- Mongolian Cyrillic: Зүвези шиан
- Mongolian script: ᠵᠦᠸᠧᠽᠢ ᠰᠢᠶᠠᠨ
Transcriptions
- SASM/GNC: Jüvėǳi siyan

Zhuozi (Mongolian: ᠵᠦᠸᠧᠽᠢ ᠰᠢᠶᠠᠨ; Chinese: 卓资县) is a county of Ulanqab prefecture-level city, which in turn is part of Inner Mongolia, China. It has an area of 3,119 km^{2} (1,204 sq mi), and in 2020 had about 85,648 inhabitants.

== Administrative divisions ==
Zhuozi County is made up of 5 towns and 3 townships.

Name	Simplified Chinese	Hanyu Pinyin	Mongolian (Hudum Script)	Mongolian (Cyrillic)	Administrative division code
Towns
Zhuozishan Town	卓资山镇	Zhuōzīshān Zhèn	ᠵᠦᠸᠧᠽᠢ ᠱᠠᠨ ᠪᠠᠯᠭᠠᠰᠤ	Зүвези шин балгас	150921106
Qixiaying Town	旗下营镇	Qíxiàyíng Zhèn	ᠴᠢ ᠰᠢᠶᠠ ᠶᠢᠩ ᠪᠠᠯᠭᠠᠰᠤ	Чи шье ин балгас	150921107
Xabartai Town	十八台镇	Shíbātái Zhèn	ᠰᠢᠪᠠᠷᠲᠠᠢ ᠪᠠᠯᠭᠠᠰᠤ	Шавартай балгас	150921108
Bayan Xil Town	巴音锡勒镇	Bāyīnxīlè Zhèn	ᠪᠠᠶᠠᠨ ᠰᠢᠯᠢ ᠪᠠᠯᠭᠠᠰᠤ	Баян шил балгас	150921109
Lihua Town	梨花镇	Líhuā Zhèn	ᠯᠢ ᠬᠤᠸᠠ ᠪᠠᠯᠭᠠᠰᠤ	Ли ухаа балгас	150921110
Townships
Dayushu Township	大榆树乡	Dàyúshù Xiāng	ᠳ᠋ᠠ ᠢᠦᠢ ᠱᠤ ᠰᠢᠶᠠᠩ	Да юй шуу шиян	150921210
Hongzhao Township	红召乡	Hóngzhào Xiāng	ᠬᠤᠩ ᠵᠣᠤ ᠰᠢᠶᠠᠩ	Хон жуу шиян	150921211
Fuxing Township	复兴乡	Fùxīng Xiāng	ᠹᠦ᠋ ᠰᠢᠩ ᠰᠢᠶᠠᠩ	Фү шин шиян	150921212

== Climate ==
Climate data for Zhuozi, elevation 1,452 m (4,764 ft), (1991–2020 normals, extremes 1981–2010)
Month	Jan	Feb	Mar	Apr	May	Jun	Jul	Aug	Sep	Oct	Nov	Dec	Year
Record high °C (°F)	7.0 (44.6)	13.8 (56.8)	22.0 (71.6)	30.4 (86.7)	31.4 (88.5)	36.6 (97.9)	36.7 (98.1)	32.6 (90.7)	32.4 (90.3)	24.5 (76.1)	16.4 (61.5)	10.0 (50.0)	36.7 (98.1)
Mean daily maximum °C (°F)	−5.8 (21.6)	−1.3 (29.7)	5.6 (42.1)	14.0 (57.2)	20.4 (68.7)	24.8 (76.6)	26.4 (79.5)	24.8 (76.6)	19.7 (67.5)	12.3 (54.1)	2.9 (37.2)	−4.5 (23.9)	11.6 (52.9)
Daily mean °C (°F)	−14.8 (5.4)	−9.8 (14.4)	−2.2 (28.0)	6.2 (43.2)	13.0 (55.4)	17.7 (63.9)	19.8 (67.6)	17.8 (64.0)	12.0 (53.6)	4.3 (39.7)	−4.7 (23.5)	−12.5 (9.5)	3.9 (39.0)
Mean daily minimum °C (°F)	−21.6 (−6.9)	−16.8 (1.8)	−9.1 (15.6)	−1.6 (29.1)	4.8 (40.6)	10.2 (50.4)	13.4 (56.1)	11.5 (52.7)	5.4 (41.7)	−1.9 (28.6)	−10.4 (13.3)	−18.5 (−1.3)	−2.9 (26.8)
Record low °C (°F)	−35.6 (−32.1)	−33.7 (−28.7)	−28.0 (−18.4)	−14.4 (6.1)	−10.0 (14.0)	−2.6 (27.3)	3.0 (37.4)	0.4 (32.7)	−6.5 (20.3)	−12.8 (9.0)	−34.0 (−29.2)	−37.2 (−35.0)	−37.2 (−35.0)
Average precipitation mm (inches)	2.6 (0.10)	3.5 (0.14)	9.1 (0.36)	16.8 (0.66)	29.9 (1.18)	52.6 (2.07)	121.8 (4.80)	77.6 (3.06)	48.3 (1.90)	21.8 (0.86)	7.8 (0.31)	2.9 (0.11)	394.7 (15.55)
Average precipitation days (≥ 0.1 mm)	3.2	3.5	5.1	4.6	7.8	11.4	14.1	11.7	9.6	6.0	3.9	3.8	84.7
Average snowy days	4.6	4.8	5.9	3.0	0.5	0	0	0	0.2	2.0	5.3	5.7	32
Average relative humidity (%)	62	54	47	41	43	54	67	70	67	62	62	63	58
Mean monthly sunshine hours	209.6	212.1	256.7	276.0	292.4	274.7	265.2	264.7	238.6	239.5	201.9	195.5	2,926.9
Percentage possible sunshine	70	70	69	69	65	61	58	63	65	71	69	68	67
Source: China Meteorological Administration
