= Hohhot East railway station =

Railway station in Hohhot, Inner Mongolia, China

Hohhot East 呼和浩特东站
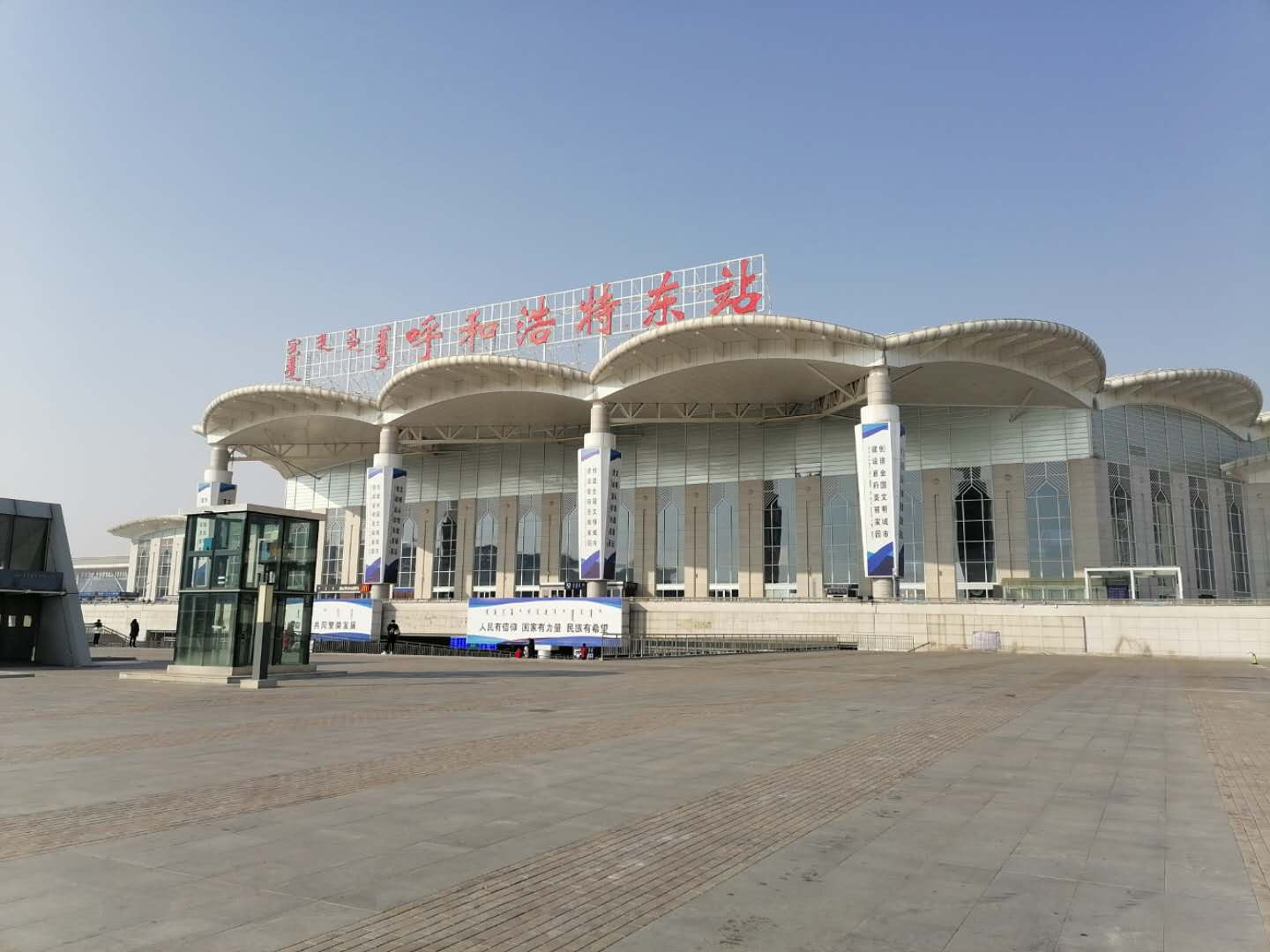
- ᠬᠥᠬᠡᠬᠣᠲᠠ ᠶᠢᠨ ᠵᠡᠭᠦᠨ ᠥᠷᠲᠡᠭᠡ

General information
- Location: Xincheng District, Hohhot, Inner Mongolia; China
- Coordinates: 40.845628°N 111.759298°E
- Operator: Hohhot Railway Bureau, China Railway Corporation
- Line: Zhangjiakou–Hohhot high-speed railway

History
- Opened: 2010

Services
Preceding station	China Railway High-speed	Following station
Qixiaying South towards Zhangjiakou (opened in 1957)	Zhangjiakou–Hohhot high-speed railway	Terminus
Location

Hohhot East railway station (Chinese: 呼和浩特东站) is a railway station of the Zhangjiakou–Hohhot high-speed railway. It is located in Xincheng District, Hohhot, Inner Mongolia.

== Hohhot Metro ==
Hohhot East Railway Station (Metro Station) 呼和浩特东站站
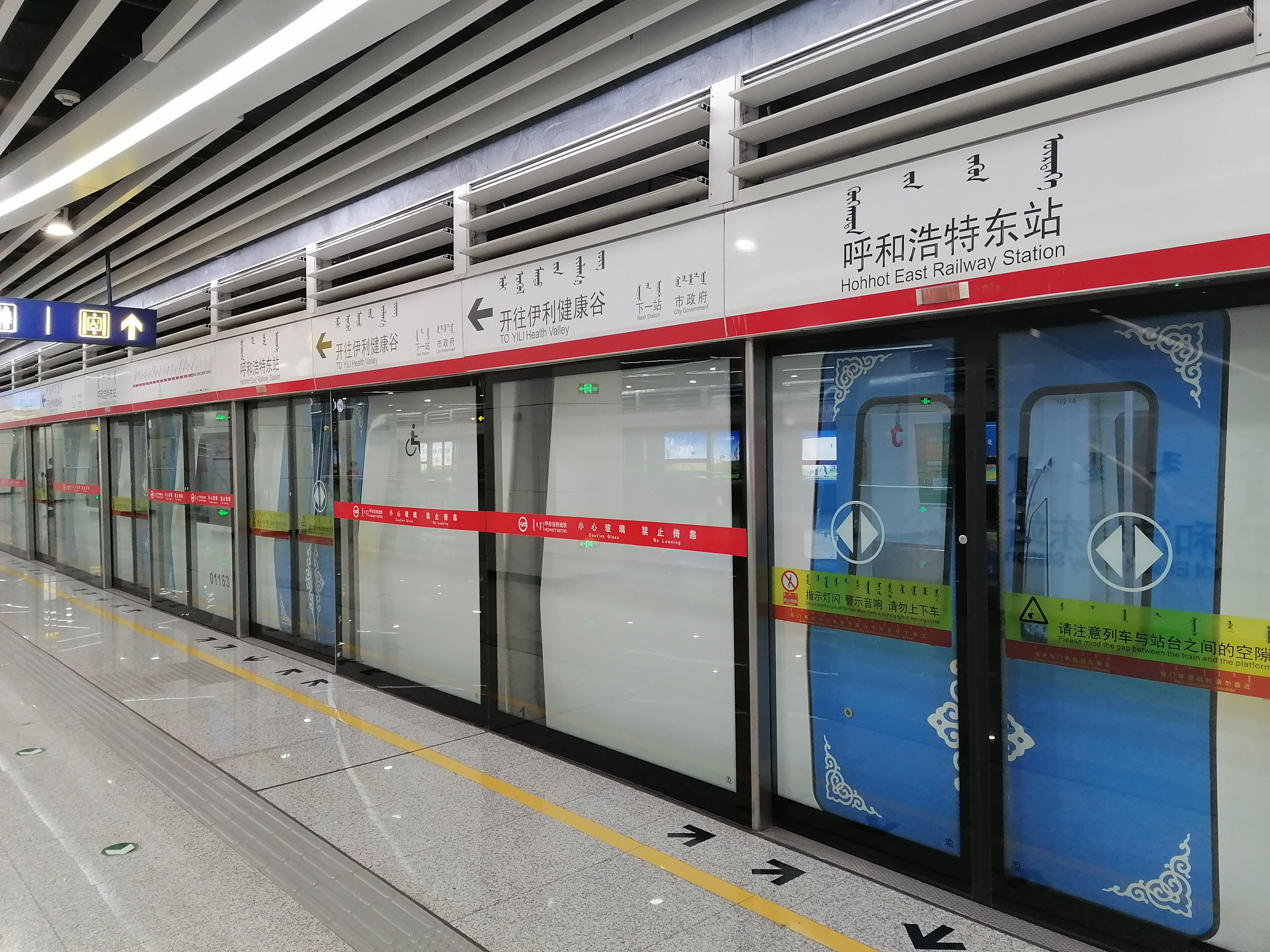
- ᠬᠥᠬᠡᠬᠣᠲᠠ ᠶᠢᠨ ᠵᠡᠭᠦᠨ ᠥᠷᠲᠡᠭᠡ

General information
- Line: Line 1

History
- Opened: 29 December 2019; 6 years ago

Services
Preceding station	Hohhot Metro	Following station
City Government towards Yili Health Valley	Line 1	Houbutaqi towards Bayan (Airport)
Location

Hohhot East railway station is served by a station on Line 1 of the Hohhot Metro. The metro station opened on 29 December 2019.
