= Changping railway station (Beijing) =

Railway station in Beijing, China

Changping railway station 昌平站
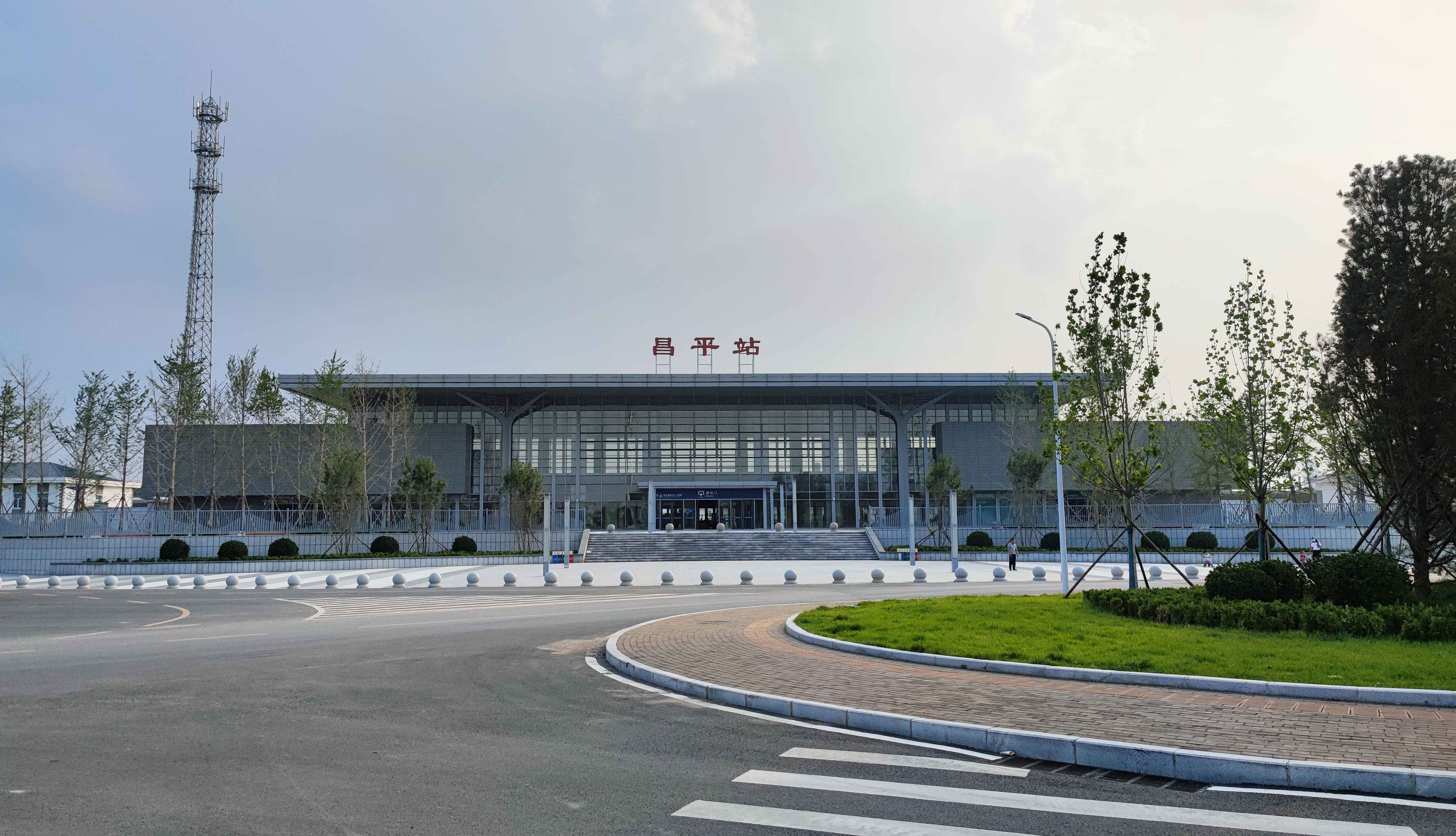
- Changping railway station in 2022

General information
- Other names: Niantou railway station
- Location: Changliu Road, Machikou, Changping District, Beijing
- Coordinates: 40°11′19.85″N 116°11′14.33″E
- Operator: Tongzhou Train Operation Depot, China Railway Beijing Group
- Lines: Beijing–Zhangjiakou intercity railway (Part of Beijing–Baotou Passenger-Dedicated Line); Beijing northeastern circle railway; Beijing–Baotou railway; Beijing–Tongliao railway
- Platforms: 2

Construction
- Structure type: at-grade

Other information
- Station code: 12173 (TMIS); CPP (telegram); CPI (pinyin)

History
- Opened: 1915
- Closed: 1 November 2016
- Rebuilt: 30 December 2019

Services
Preceding station	China Railway	Following station
Shahe towards Beijing North	Beijing–Zhangjiakou intercity railway section of Beijing–Baotou Passenger-Dedicated Line	Badaling Great Wall towards Zhangjiakou, Yanqing or Taizicheng
Terminus	Beijing–Baotou railway	Nankou towards Baotou
Terminus	Beijing–Tongliao railway	Changping North towards Tongliao
Location

Changping railway station (Chinese: 昌平站; pinyin: Chāngpíng zhàn) is a railway station located on Changliu Road, Machikou, Changping District, Beijing.

Changping railway station started to be passed through in 1909, but the station was set later in 1915 to improve the traffic capacity. On November 1, 2016, the station stopped all customer service to reconstruct. It is a station on the Beijing–Zhangjiakou intercity railway, opened on 30 December 2019.

The station is one of the major railway stations in Changping District, but it is much further than Changping North railway station located in the urban area of Changping District.
