= Donghuayuan North railway station =

Railway station in Donghuayuan, China

Coordinates: 40.3415°N 115.7885°E

Donghuayuanbei 东花园北
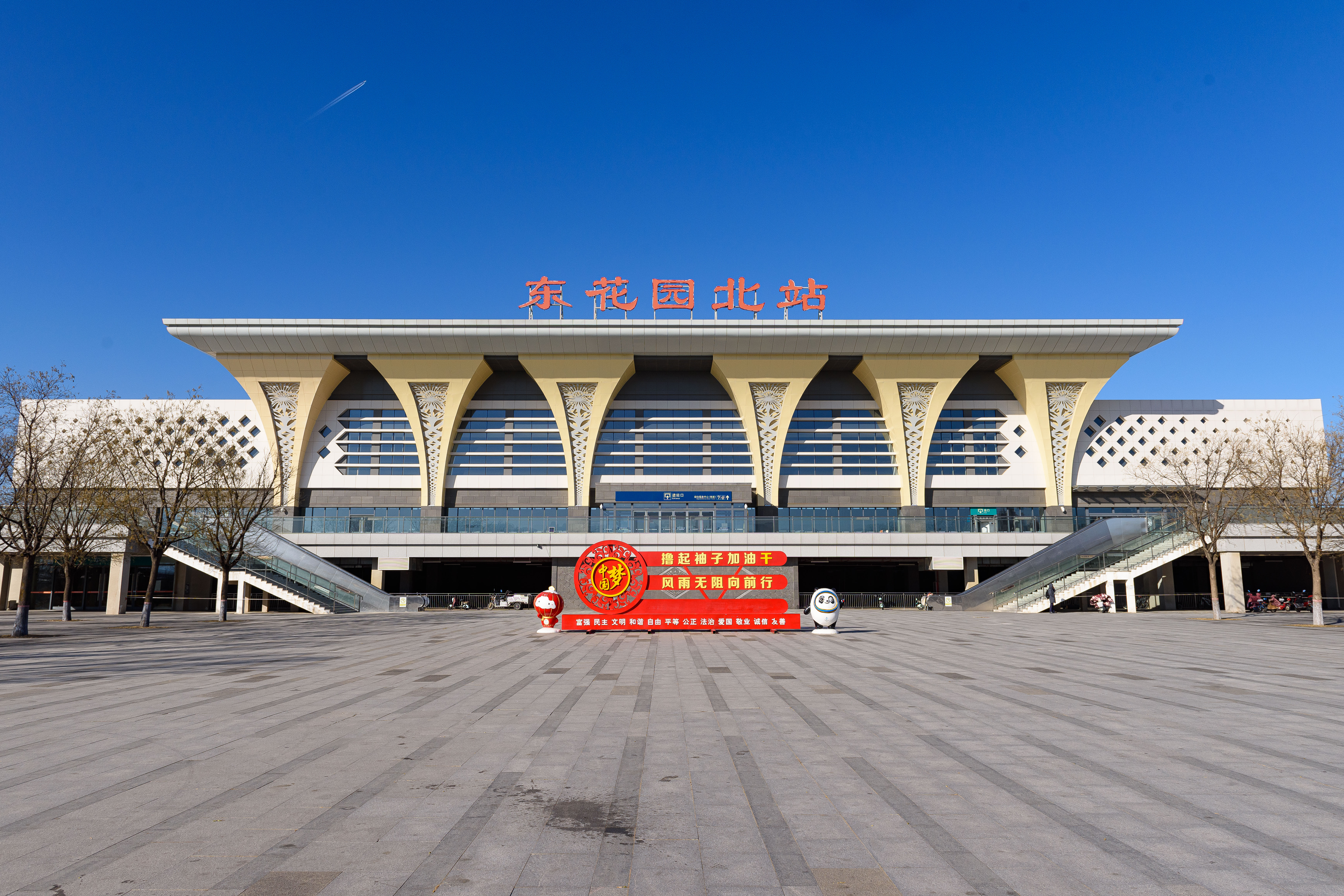
- Station building in 2025

General information
- Location: Donghuayuan Town, Huailai County, Zhangjiakou, Hebei; China

Other information
- Station code: 12183

History
- Opened: December 30, 2019

Services
Preceding station	China Railway	Following station
Badaling Great Wall towards Beijing North	Beijing–Zhangjiakou intercity railway section of Beijing-Baotou PDL	Huailai towards Zhangjiakou or Hohhot

Donghuayuan North railway station (Chinese: 东花园北站; pinyin: Dōnghuāyuán Běi zhàn) is a railway station located in People's Republic of China.

It is a station on the Beijing-Zhangjiakou intercity railway, opening on December 30, 2019.
