= Qinghuayuan railway station =

Abandoned railway station in Beijing, China

Coordinates: 39°58′52″N 116°20′01″E

Qinghuayuan 清华园站
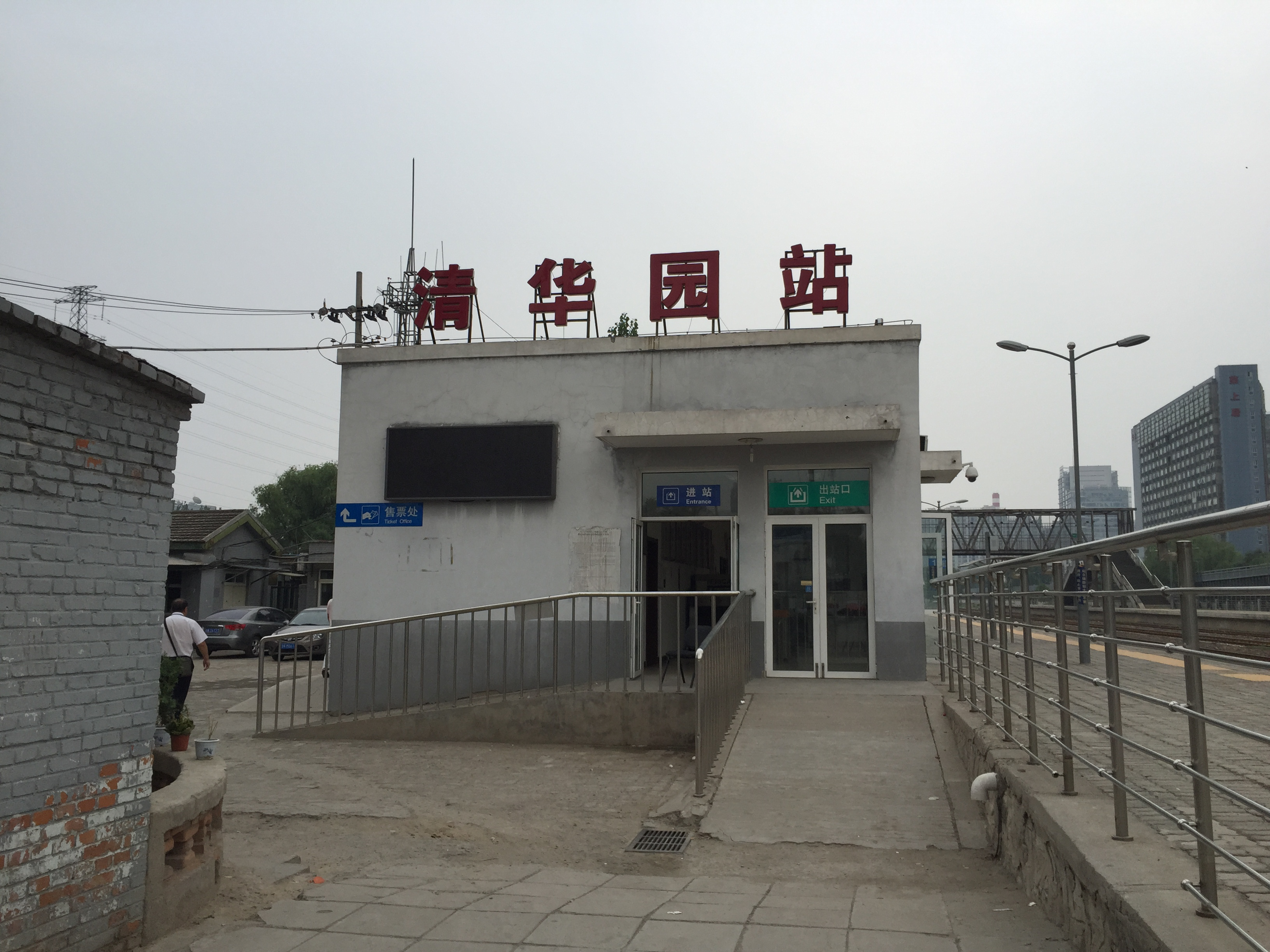

General information
- Location: Haidian District, Beijing; China
- Line: Beijing-Baotou railway

History
- Opened: 1910
- Closed: 2016
Location

Qinghuayuan railway station (simplified Chinese: 清华园站; traditional Chinese: 清華園站; pinyin: Qīnghuáyuán Zhàn) was a railway station in Beijing.

== History ==
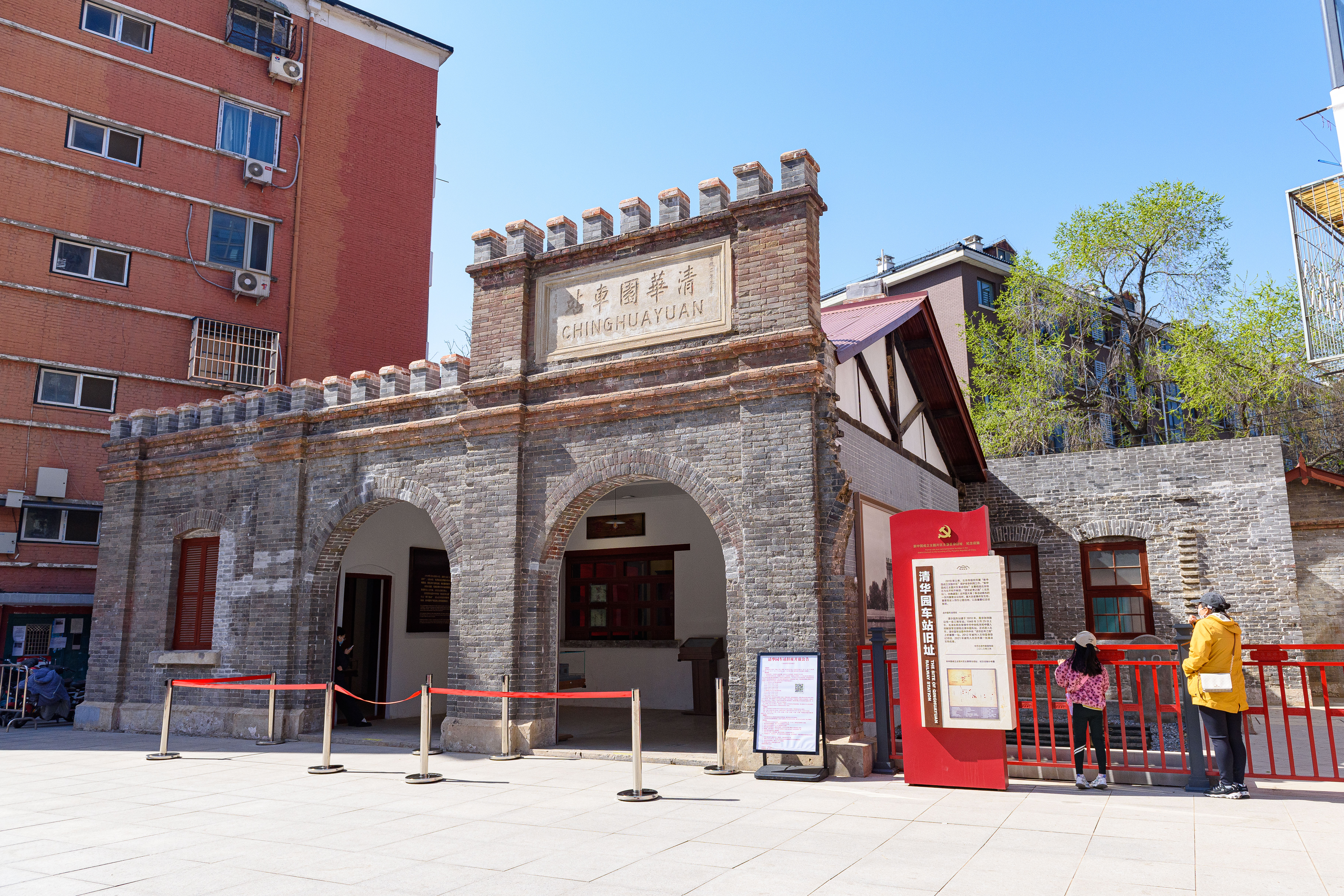
The initial station building, completed in 1910, became a museum after renovation in 2023

The construction work of the station was completed in 1910. The station was located near the east gate of Tsinghua University. In early 1950s, the old station moved to its new location, about 0.5 kilometers south to the former station. The new station was located south to 4th Ring Road, just east to the later built elevated Beijing Subway line 13.

The station was named after Tsinghua Garden.

It was closed on November 1, 2016, and today houses the Jingzhang Railway Heritage Park and Museum.

== Schedules ==
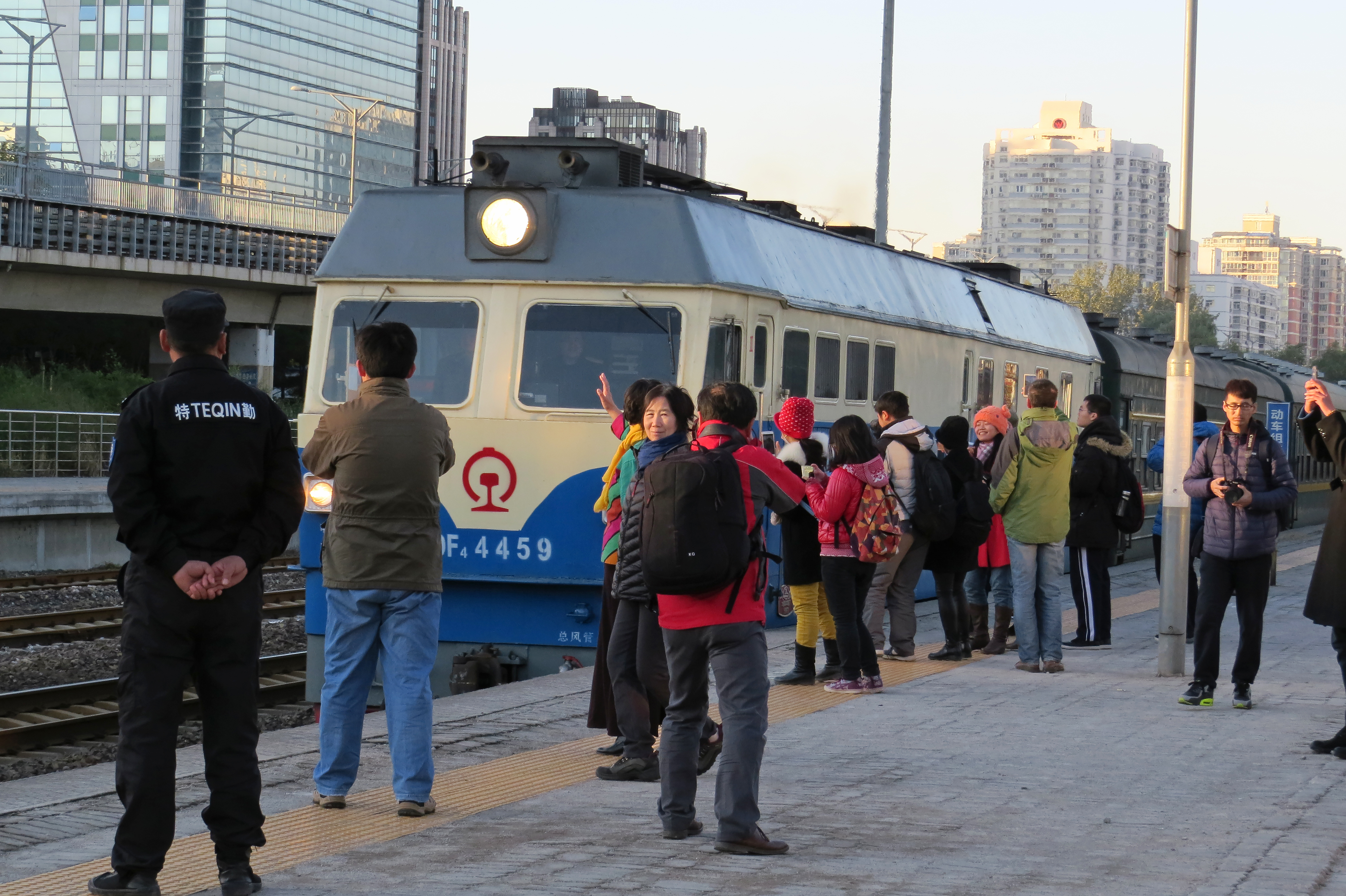
Train 4472 entering Qinghuayuan Station on the last day before its closure

28 passenger trains stopped at the station before it ceased operation:

Train No.	Arrive	Depart	Stops	
S201	06:17	06:25	8 min	Beijing North – Yanqing
S202	07:26	07:27	1 min	Yanqing – Beijing north
S287	08:03	08:04	1 min	Beijing North – Shacheng
S203	08:04	08:05	1 min	Beijing North – Yanqing
S204	08:02	08:06	4 min	Yanqing – Beijing north
S206	08:22	08:23	1 min	Yanqing – Beijing north
S208	09:38	09:39	1 min	Yanqing – Beijing north
4471	09:19	09:55	36 min	Beijing North – Longhua
S209	11:02	11:03	1 min	Beijing North – Yanqing
S210	12:03	12:04	1 min	Yanqing – Beijing North
S214	13:03	13:04	1 min	Yanqing – Beijing North
S213	13:19	13:20	1 min	Beijing North – Yanqing
S216	14:52	14:53	1 min	Yanqing – Beijing North
S217	15:29	15:30	1 min	Beijing North – Yanqing
4472	16:21	16:23	2 min	Longhua – Beijing North
S218	16:34	16:35	1 min	Yanqing – Beijing North
S220	17:10	17:17	7 min	Yanqing – Beijing North
S222	17:32	17:33	1 min	Yanqing – Beijing North
S221	17:46	17:47	1 min	Beijing North – Yanqing
S224	18:45	18:46	1 min	Yanqing – Beijing North
S223	18:44	18:47	3 min	Beijing North – Yanqing
S225	19:16	19:17	1 min	Beijing North – Yanqing
S226	21:02	21:03	1 min	Yanqing – Beijing North
S227	21:33	21:34	1 min	Beijing North – Yanqing
S228	21:29	21:35	6 min	Yanqing – Beijing North
S230	22:10	22:11	1 min	Yanqing – Beijing North
S229	22:08	22:12	4 min	Beijing North – Yanqing
S232	22:54	22:55	1 min	Yanqing – Beijing North

Schedule updated on Jul. 1st, 2015. Note: Trains with the number 7xxxx have been cancelled due to the opening of Line S2.

Preceding station	China Railway	Following station
Beijing North Terminus	Beijing–Baotou railway	Qinghe towards Baotou
