= Shahe railway station =

Railway station in Beijing, China

Shahe railway station 沙河站
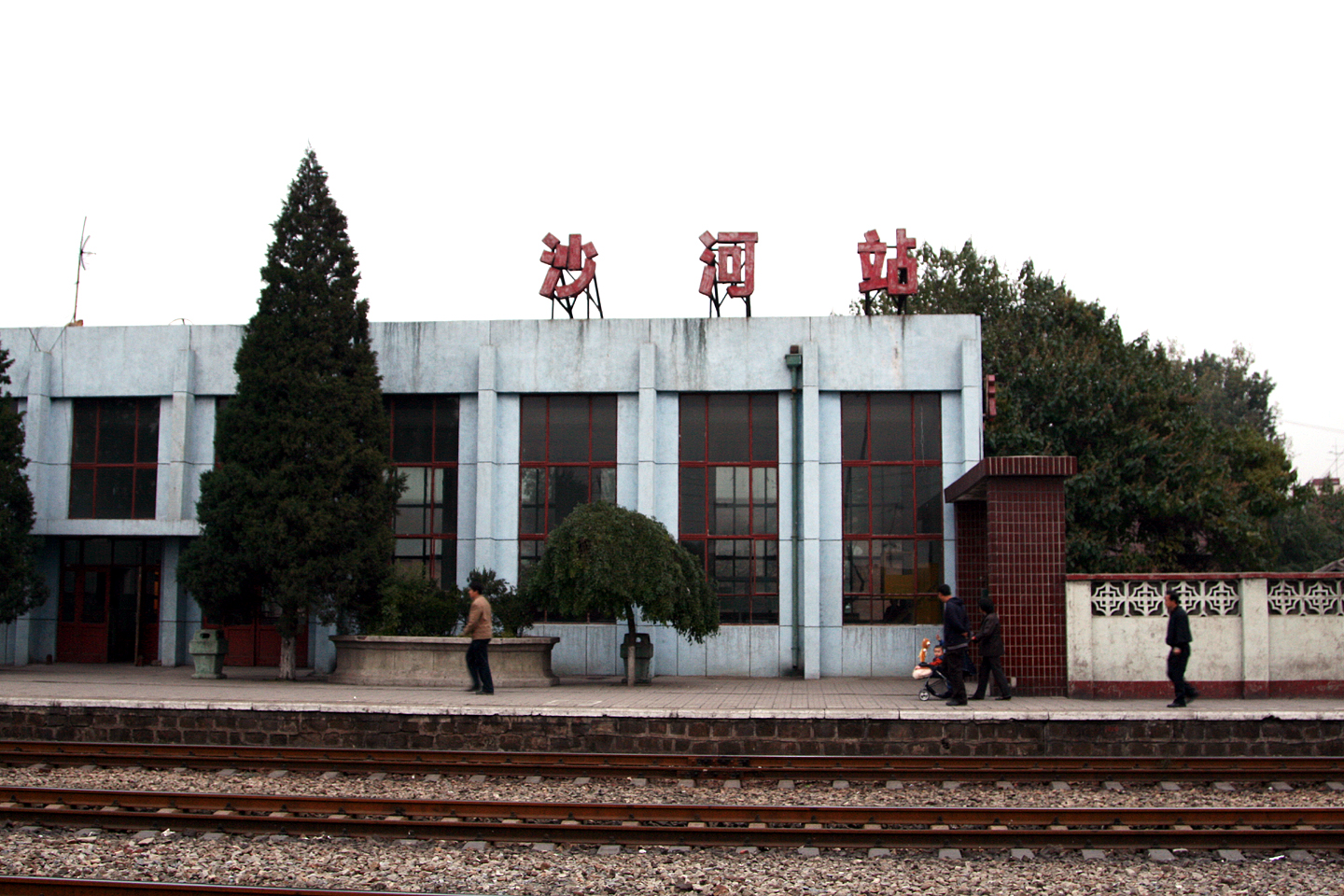
- Shahe railway station

General information
- Location: Shahe, Changping District, Beijing
- Coordinates: 40°07′26″N 116°15′32″E
- Lines: Beijing–Baotou railway; Shuangqiao–Shahe railway; Beijing Northwestern Ring railway; Beijing–Zhangjiakou intercity railway (Part of Beijing–Baotou Passenger-Dedicated Line)

Other information
- Station code: 12170 (TMIS); SHP (telegram); SHE (pinyin)

History
- Opening: 1905

Services
| Preceding station | China Railway | Following station |
|---|---|---|
| Qinghe towards Beijing North | Beijing–Zhangjiakou intercity railway section of Beijing-Baotou PDL | Changping towards Zhangjiakou |
| Huangtudian towards Beijing | Beijing–Baotou railway | Changping towards Baotou |
| Qinghe towards Beijing North | Beijing–Baotou railway | Changping towards Baotou |
Location

Shahe railway station (Chinese: 沙河站; pinyin: Shāhé Zhàn) is a railway station in Beijing. Passenger services ceased on 15 September 2012.

It is a station on the Beijing–Zhangjiakou intercity railway, currently no trains stop at this station.

== See also ==
- Shahe station
- List of stations on Jingbao railway
