= Beijing–Zhangjiakou intercity railway =

High speed railway line in Hebei, China

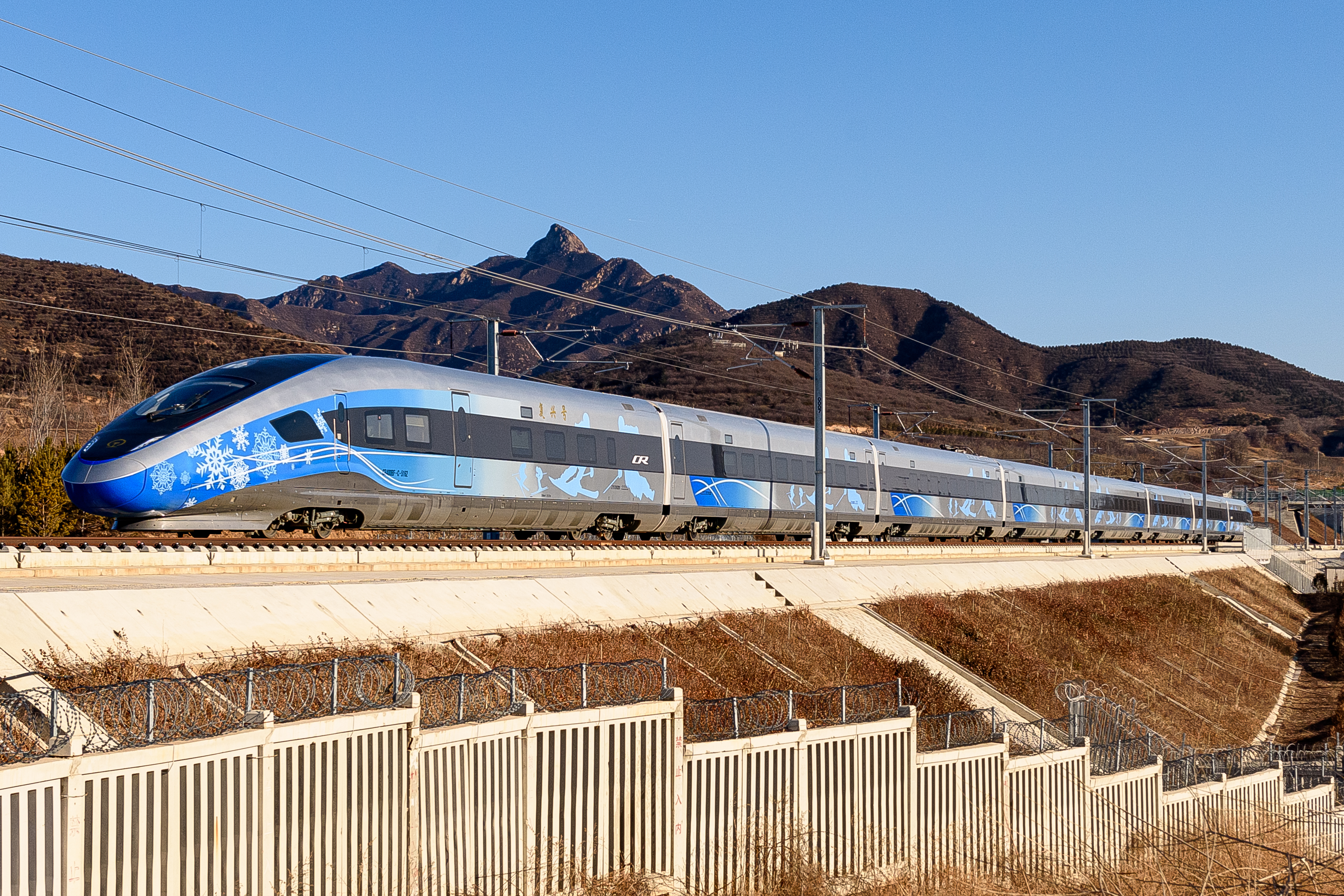
- A CR400BF-C train, having been converted to 2022 Winter Olympics media coverage train by China Media Group, on the Beijing-Zhangjiakou HSR near Chengjiayao village, Badaling town

Overview
- Other names: Beijing–Zhangjiakou high-speed railway; Beijing-Zhangjiakou section of Beijing–Baotou passenger-dedicated line
- Native name: 京张客运专线 京包客运专线京张段 京张城际铁路
- Status: In operation
- Owner: Jingzhang Intercity Railway Co. Ltd.
- Locale: Beijing; Hebei province
- Termini: Beijing North; Zhangjiakou
- Stations: 10

Service
- Type: High-speed rail
- System: China Railway High-speed
- Services: 1
- Operator(s): CR Beijing
- Depot(s): Beijing North Depot

History
- Opened: December 30, 2019 (Main line & Chongli branch); December 1, 2020 (Yanqing branch)

Technical
- Line length: 173.947 km (108.086 mi)
- Track gauge: 1,435 mm (4 ft 8 1/2 in) standard gauge
- Electrification: 25 kV 50 Hz AC (Overhead line)
- Operating speed: 350 km/h (220 mph)

The Beijing–Zhangjiakou intercity railway, also known as the Jingzhang intercity railway, Jingzhang high speed railway, Jingzhang section of Beijing-Baotou PDL, is a driverless high-speed railway between Beijing and Zhangjiakou in Hebei province, China. The line was opened on 30 December 2019, and is the world's first fully driverless high-speed railway, shortening the traveling time from Beijing to Zhangjiakou from 3 hours 7 minutes to 47 minutes. It forms part of both the longer Beijing–Lanzhou corridor and the Beijing–Zhangjiakou–Datong–Taiyuan branch of the Beijing–Kunming corridor.

The main line has 10 stations. The Chongli Branch has two more stations, Zhaochuan South (reserved station) and Taizicheng. The Yanqing branch has another station, Yanqing railway station. The main line and the Chongli branch opened on December 30, 2019. The Yanqing branch opened on December 1, 2020.

This route has a length of 173.947 kilometres (108.086 mi) of double tracked high speed rail, with a maximum speed of 350 km/h (217 mph) between Badaling West block post and Donghuayuan North. However, within urban Beijing in the south of Changping station, the maximum speed is restricted to 80, 160 and 200 km/h (50, 99 and 124 mph), respectively. The rest of the line has a maximum speed of 250 km/h (160 mph).

The railway was originally scheduled to start construction in 2009. However, because the Ministry of Railways adjusted the high-speed rail construction program, this was postponed until 2014. This railway connects with the Zhangjiakou–Hohhot high-speed railway and Datong–Zhangjiakou high-speed railway in Zhangjiakou.

== Route description ==
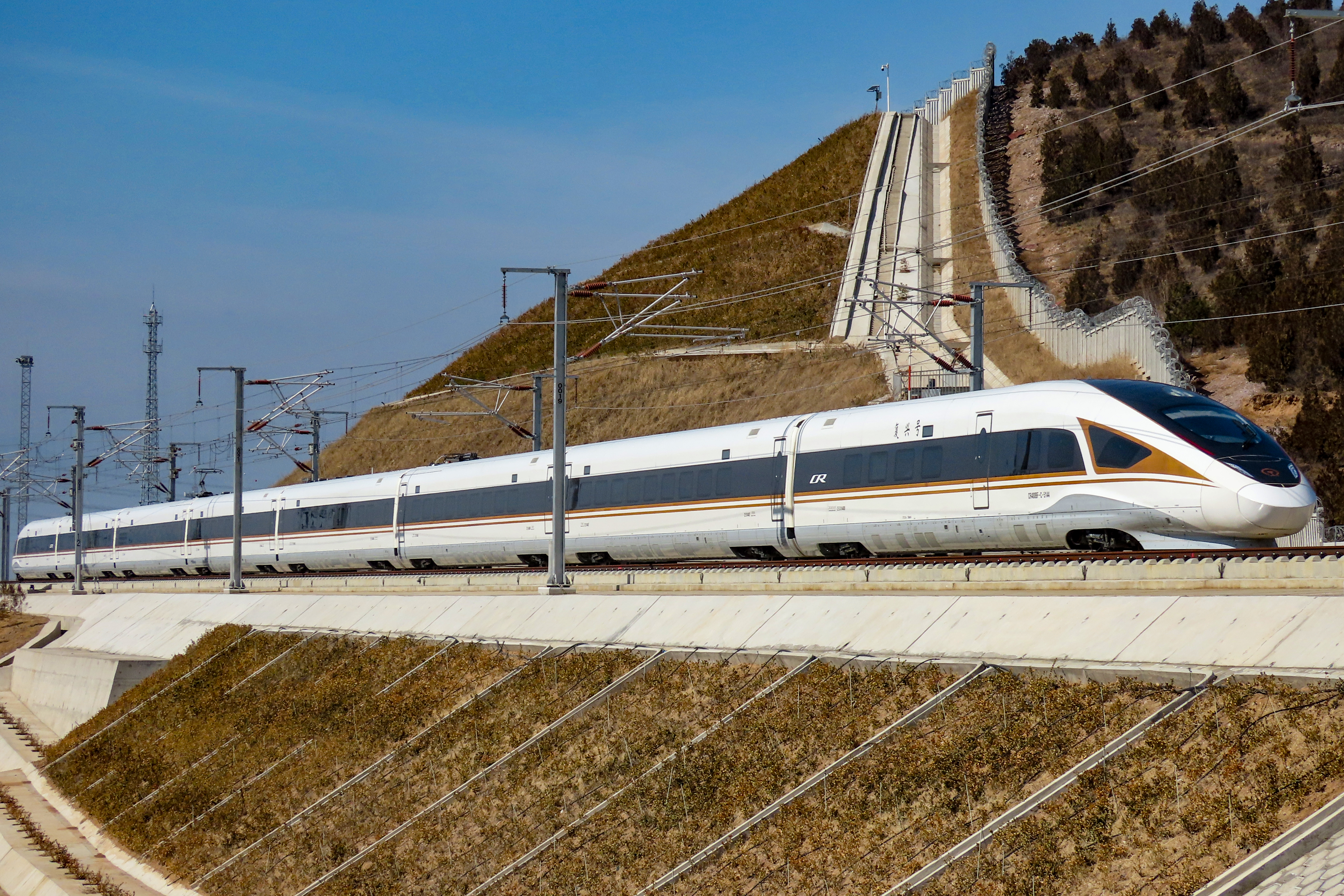
CR400BF-C, the train dedicated for Beijing–Zhangjiakou HSR

Leading north from Beijing North railway station the line passes the stations of Qinghe, Shahe and Changping. It enters a tunnel under the Great Wall at Badaling and arriving at Badaling Great Wall railway station, avoiding the famous switchback, zigzag conventional railway line. North of this, a branch from the tunnel connects to Yanqing in preparation for the 2022 Winter Olympic Games venues there. After entering Hebei province, there is a station at Donghuayuan North and the line runs next to the Beijing-Zhangjiakou highway across the Guanting Reservoir before arriving at the stations at Huailai, Xiahuayuan North and Xuanhua North before terminating at the existing Zhangjiakou railway station.

The total length of this project was 173.947 kilometres (108.086 mi), of which 70.42 kilometres (43.76 mi) is in Beijing and 103.527 kilometres (64.329 mi) is in Zhangjiakou, Hebei Province. The project had an estimated investment cost of 23.62 billion Yuan. Construction of the unit was carried out by the "Beijing-Zhangjiakou Intercity Railway Limited", a company incorporated in November 7, 2013. Registered capital of 100 million yuan. Shareholders are in this company are the Beijing Railway Bureau (60.02%), Beijing Infrastructure Investment Co. Ltd. (formerly the Beijing Subway Group Co., Ltd.) (32.42%) and Zhangjiakou Winton Holdings Limited with 7.56% of total shares.

== Stations ==
=== Main Line ===
| Station Name | Chinese | Total distance (km) | Travel Time | High-speed rail transfers | Metro and local rail transfers | Platforms | Tracks served by platform | Location | | |
|---|---|---|---|---|---|---|---|---|---|---|
| Beijing North | 北京北 | 0 | 0 | | 2 4 13 (via Xizhimen) | 6 | 11 | Beijing | Xicheng | |
| Qinghe | 清河 | 11 | | | 13 Changping; Huairou–Miyun | 4 | 8 | Beijing | Haidian | |
| Shahe | 沙河 | 21 | | | Beijing Northeastern Circle Railway; Beijing Northwestern Circle Railway | 1 | | Beijing | Changping | |
| Changping | 昌平 | 31 | | | Beijing–Baotou railway Beijing–Tongliao railway | 2 | 8 | Beijing | Changping | |
| Badaling Great Wall | 八达岭长城 | 56 | | Yanqing Branch (via Badaling West block post) | S2 (via Badaling) | 2 | 4 | Beijing | Yanqing | |
| Donghuayuan North | 东花园北 | 77 | | | | 2 | 4 | Hebei | Zhangjiakou | Huailai |
| Huailai | 怀来 | 98 | | | | 2 | 4 | Hebei | Zhangjiakou | Huailai |
| Xiahuayuan North | 下花园北 | 125 | | Chongli Branch | | 2 | 5 | Hebei | Zhangjiakou | Xiahuayuan |
| Xuanhua North | 宣化北 | 152 | | | | 2 | 4 | Hebei | Zhangjiakou | Xuanhua |
| Zhangjiakou | 张家口 | 172 | | Zhangjiakou–Hohhot high-speed railway Datong–Zhangjiakou high-speed railway | Jingbao Railway; Zhangji Railway | 6 | 16 | Hebei | Zhangjiakou | Qiaodong |

=== Yanqing Branch ===
Yanqing branch opened on December 1, 2020.

| Station Name | Chinese | Total distance (km) | Travel Time | High-speed rail transfers | Metro and local rail transfers | Platforms | Tracks served by platform | Location | |
|---|---|---|---|---|---|---|---|---|---|
| Badaling Great Wall | 八达岭长城 | 56 | | | S2 (via Badaling) | 2 | 4 | Beijing | Yanqing |
| Badaling West block post | 八达岭西线路所 | | | Main Line | | | | Beijing | Yanqing |
| Yanqing | 延庆 | | | | S2; Kangzhuang-Yanqing railway | 3 | 4 | Beijing | Yanqing |

=== Chongli Branch ===
Also known as "Chongli railway" or "Winter Olympics Branch", the Chongli Branch opened in December 2019 from Xiahuayuan North to Taizicheng. A 16 km (9.9 mi) extension from Taizicheng to Chongli opened on 6 January 2022. The section from Taizicheng to Chongli is also part of the future Taizicheng-Xilinhot railway.

| Station Name | Chinese | Total distance (km) | Travel Time | High-speed rail transfers | Metro and local rail transfers | Platforms | Tracks served by platform | Location | | |
|---|---|---|---|---|---|---|---|---|---|---|
| Xiahuayuan North | 下花园北 | 125 | | Main Line | | 2 | 5 | Hebei | Zhangjiakou | Xiahuayuan |
| Zhaochuan South (reserved station) | 赵川南 | | | | | | | Hebei | Zhangjiakou | Xuanhua |
| Taizicheng | 太子城 | 177 | | | | 3 | 4 | Hebei | Zhangjiakou | Chongli |
| Chongli | 崇礼 | 193 | | Taizicheng-Xilinhot railway (U/C) | | | | Hebei | Zhangjiakou | Chongli |

== 2022 Winter Olympic Games ==
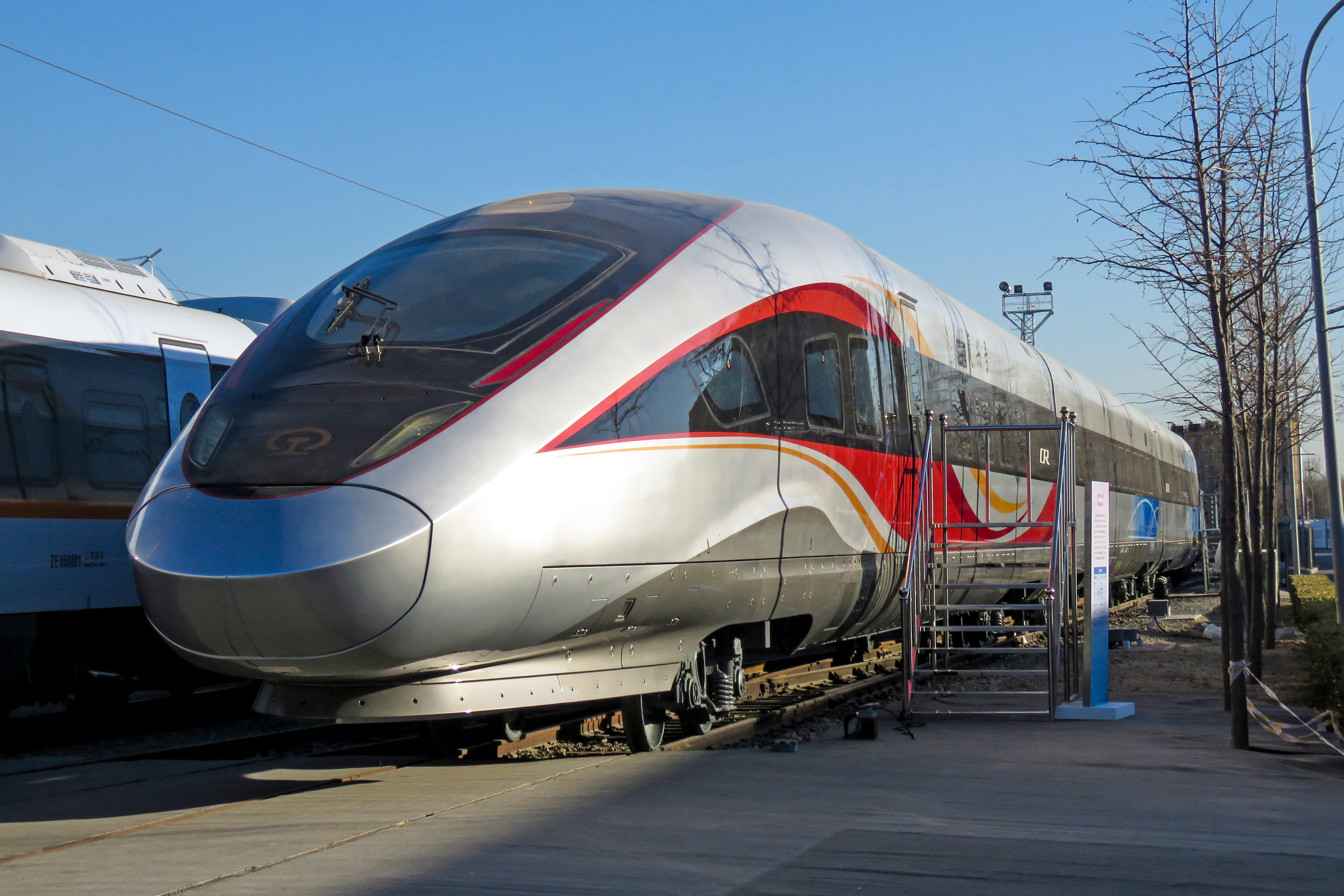
Mock-up of dedicated train for Beijing–Zhangjiakou intercity railway, based on CR400BF

The Beijing-Zhangjiakou intercity railway was considered a crucial and vital link between all three venue clusters for the 2022 Winter Olympics held in Beijing. The urban area of Beijing would host most of the indoor skating, ice hockey and curling events plus the opening and closing ceremonies. Yanqing District, a suburban district of Beijing, would host Alpine skiing plus the luge and bobsleigh. Zhangjiakou, a city in Hebei Province, would host Nordic skiing, snowboarding and freestyle skiing. This railway placed all Olympic venues within one hour of each other.
