= Xuanhua North railway station =

Railway station in Hebei, China

Coordinates: 40.63123°N 115.042504°E

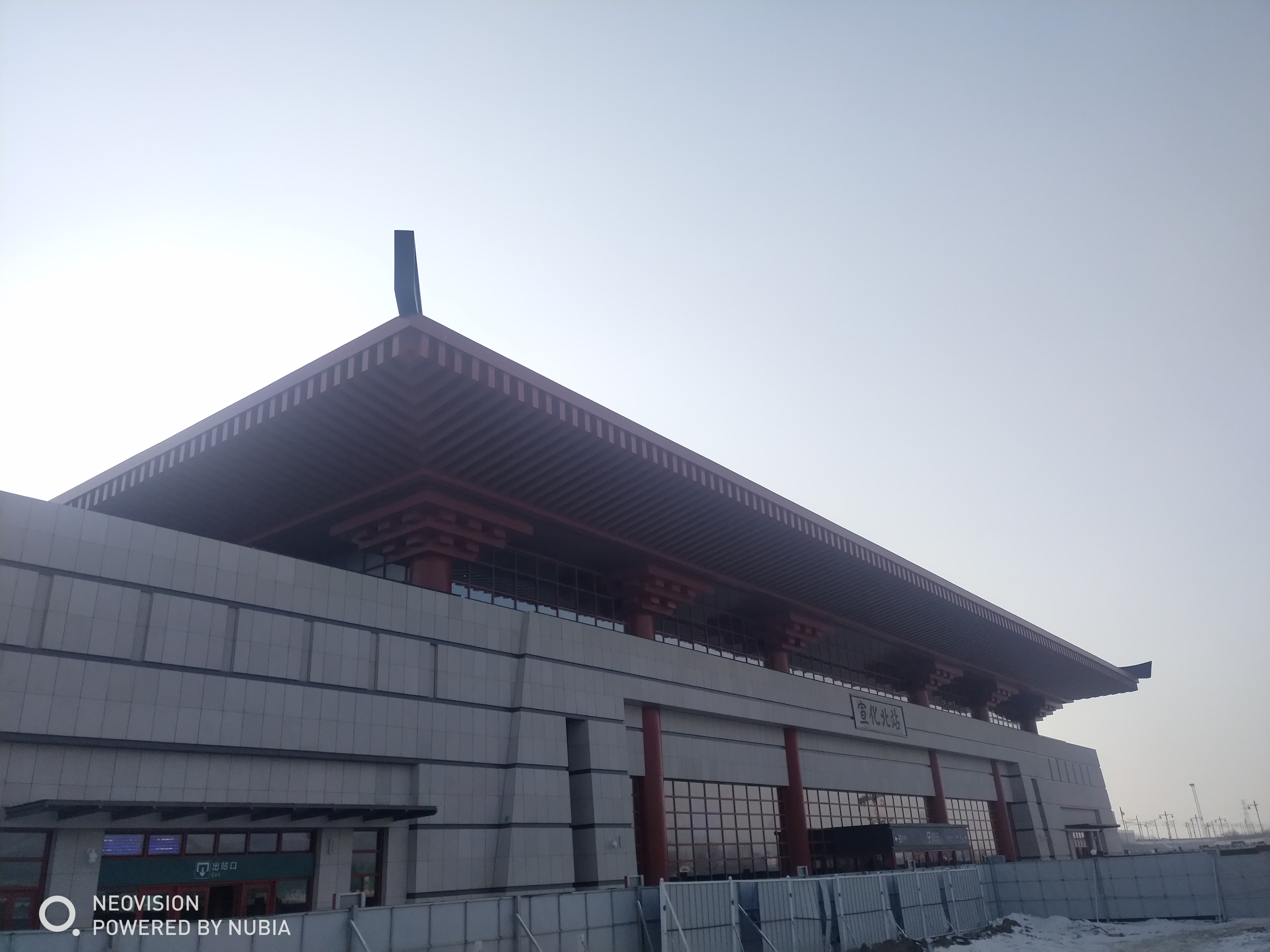
Xuanhuabei Railway Station.

Xuanhuabei (Xuanhua North) railway station (Chinese: 宣化北站; pinyin: Xuānhuà Běi zhàn) is a railway station in People's Republic of China. It is located along the Beijing–Zhangjiakou intercity railway.

== See also ==
- Xuanhua railway station

Preceding station	China Railway High-speed	Following station
Xiahuayuan North towards Beijing North	Beijing–Zhangjiakou intercity railway	Zhangjiakou (opened in 1957) Terminus
