= Huailai railway station =

Railway station in Hebei, China

Coordinates: 40.376689°N 115.558223°E

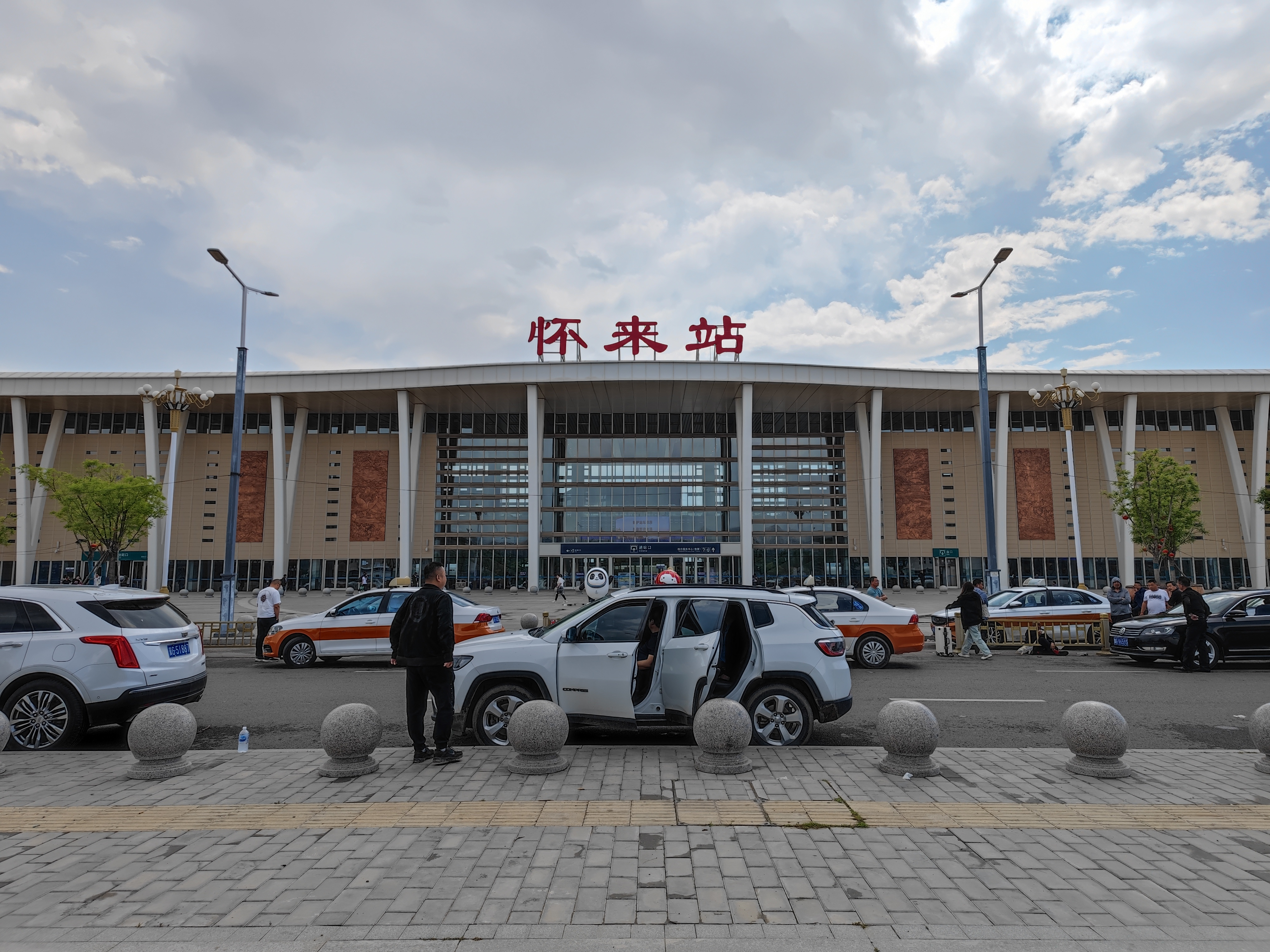
Huailai Railway Station.

Huailai railway station (Chinese: 怀来站; pinyin: Huáilái zhàn) is a railway station in the People's Republic of China.

== See also ==
- Shacheng railway station

Preceding station	China Railway High-speed	Following station
Donghuayuan North towards Beijing North	Beijing–Zhangjiakou intercity railway	Xiahuayuan North towards Zhangjiakou (opened in 1957)
