= Badaling Great Wall railway station =

Railway station in Beijing, China

Badaling Great Wall railway station 八达岭长城站
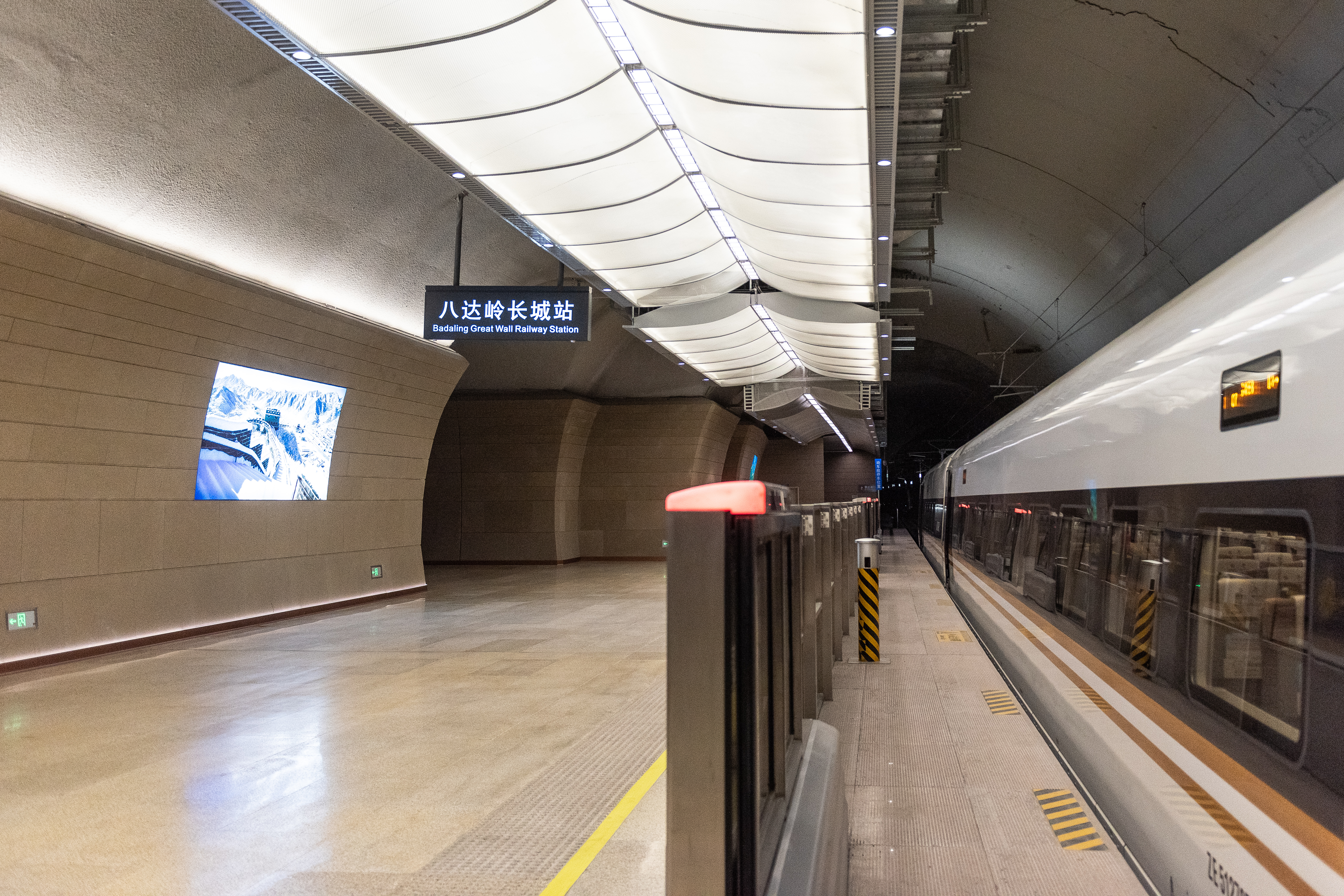
- Platform 2 in December 2020

General information
- Other names: Badalingchangcheng railway station
- Location: Badaling Town, Yanqing District, Beijing
- Coordinates: 40.3580°N 116.0048°E
- Owner: Jingzhang Intercity Railway Co. Ltd.
- Operator: Tongzhou Train Operation Depot, China Railway Beijing Group
- Line: Beijing–Zhangjiakou intercity railway (Part of Beijing–Baotou Passenger-Dedicated Line)
- Platforms: 2 side platforms

Construction
- Structure type: underground
- Depth: 102 m (335 ft)

Other information
- Station code: 12181 (TMIS); VLP (telegram); BDC (pinyin)

History
- Opening: 30 December 2019

Services
Preceding station	China Railway	Following station
Changping towards Beijing North	Beijing–Zhangjiakou intercity railway section of Beijing-Baotou PDL	Donghuayuan North towards Zhangjiakou or Hohhot
Changping towards Beijing North	Beijing–Zhangjiakou intercity railway section of Beijing-Baotou PDL	Yanqing Terminus
Location

Badaling Great Wall railway station (Chinese: 八达岭长城站; pinyin: Bādálǐng chángchéng zhàn), also translated as Badalingchangcheng railway station, is a railway station in Badaling scenic area, Yanqing District, Beijing. The station hall started construction on 30 November 2018 to build an underground high-speed railway station on the Beijing–Zhangjiakou intercity railway (Part of Beijing–Baotou Passenger-Dedicated Line) opened on 30 December 2019.

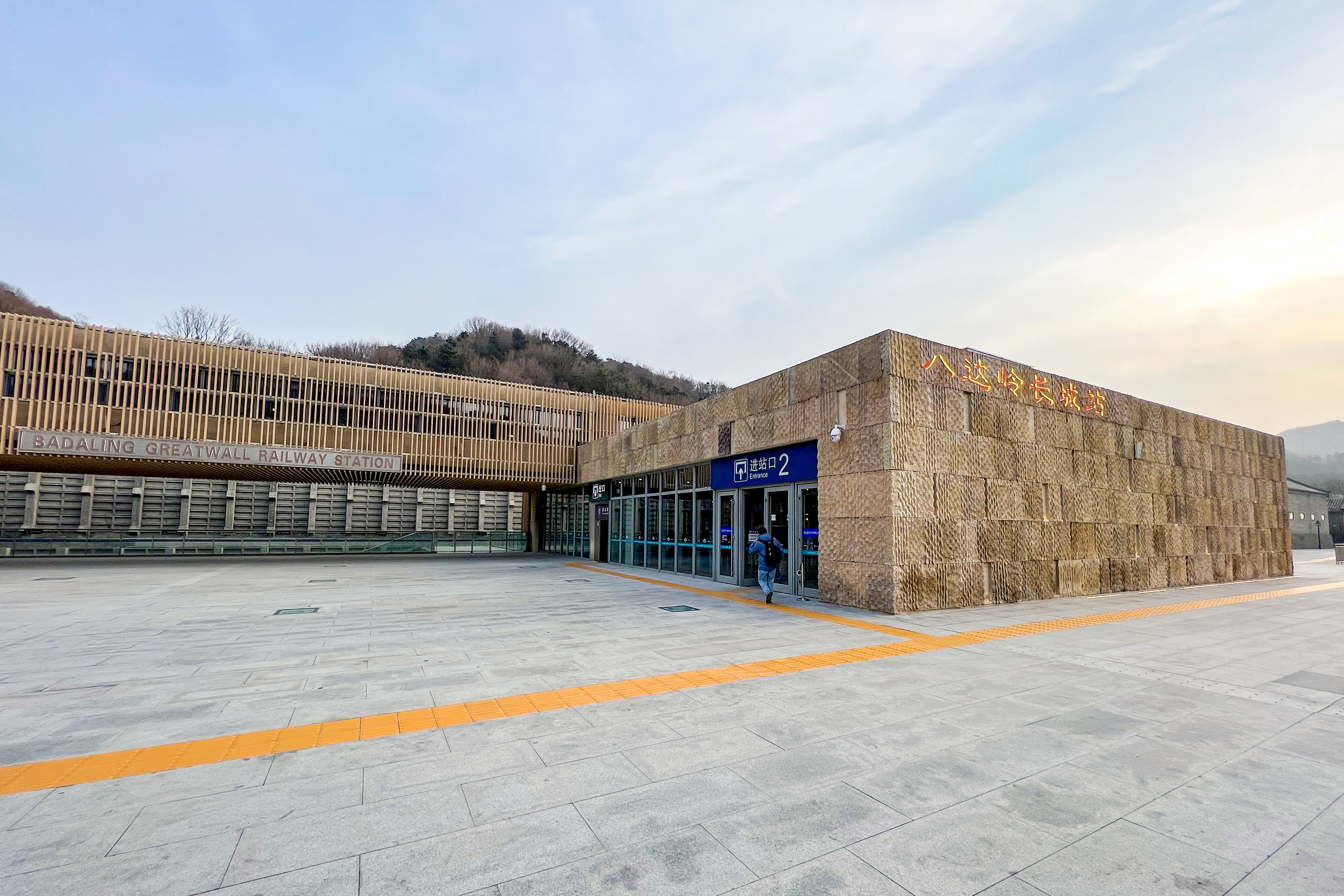
The station building in January 2022

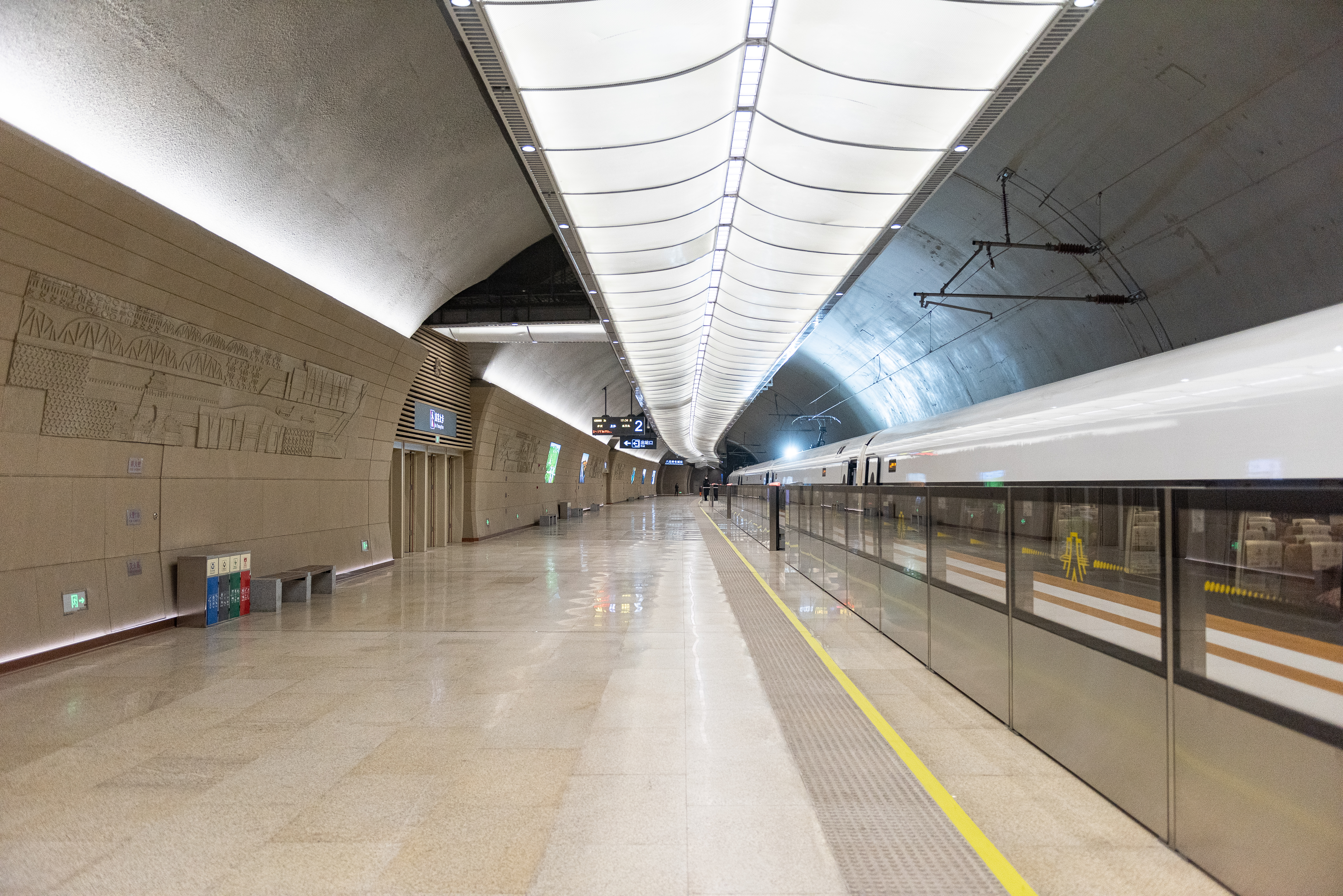
Platform 2 (December 2020)

The total floorage of the station is 49,000 square metres (530,000 sq ft), including 9,000 square metres (97,000 sq ft) overground station building and 40,000 square metres (430,000 sq ft) underground track area and platform area. The platforms and the station building are beneath the Great Wall and located 60 metres (200 ft) below the surface, making it the deepest high-speed railway station in the world. The architectural design manages to extend the mountain and the natural landscape within the resort itself.

This station is designed by AREP and China Railway Engineering Consulting Group, and constructed by China Railway 5th Engineering Group. On 23 August 2019, the station building successfully capped, marking the completion of all station buildings on Jingzhang HSR.

== See also ==
- Beijing–Zhangjiakou intercity railway
- Beijing North railway station
