= Badaling =

Section of Great Wall of China near Beijing

Coordinates: 40°21′15″N 116°00′25″E

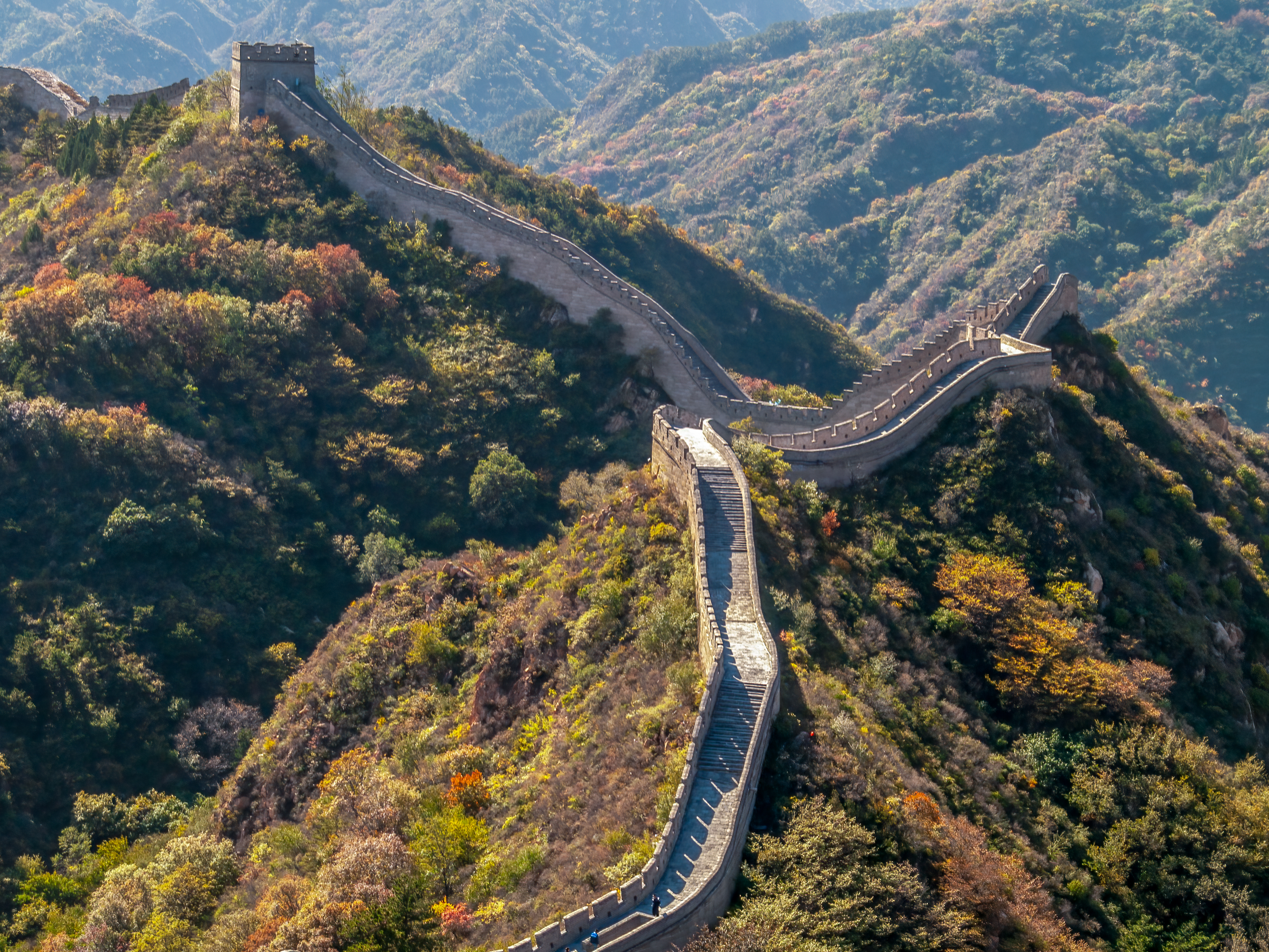
The Great Wall of China, Badaling Section, 2007

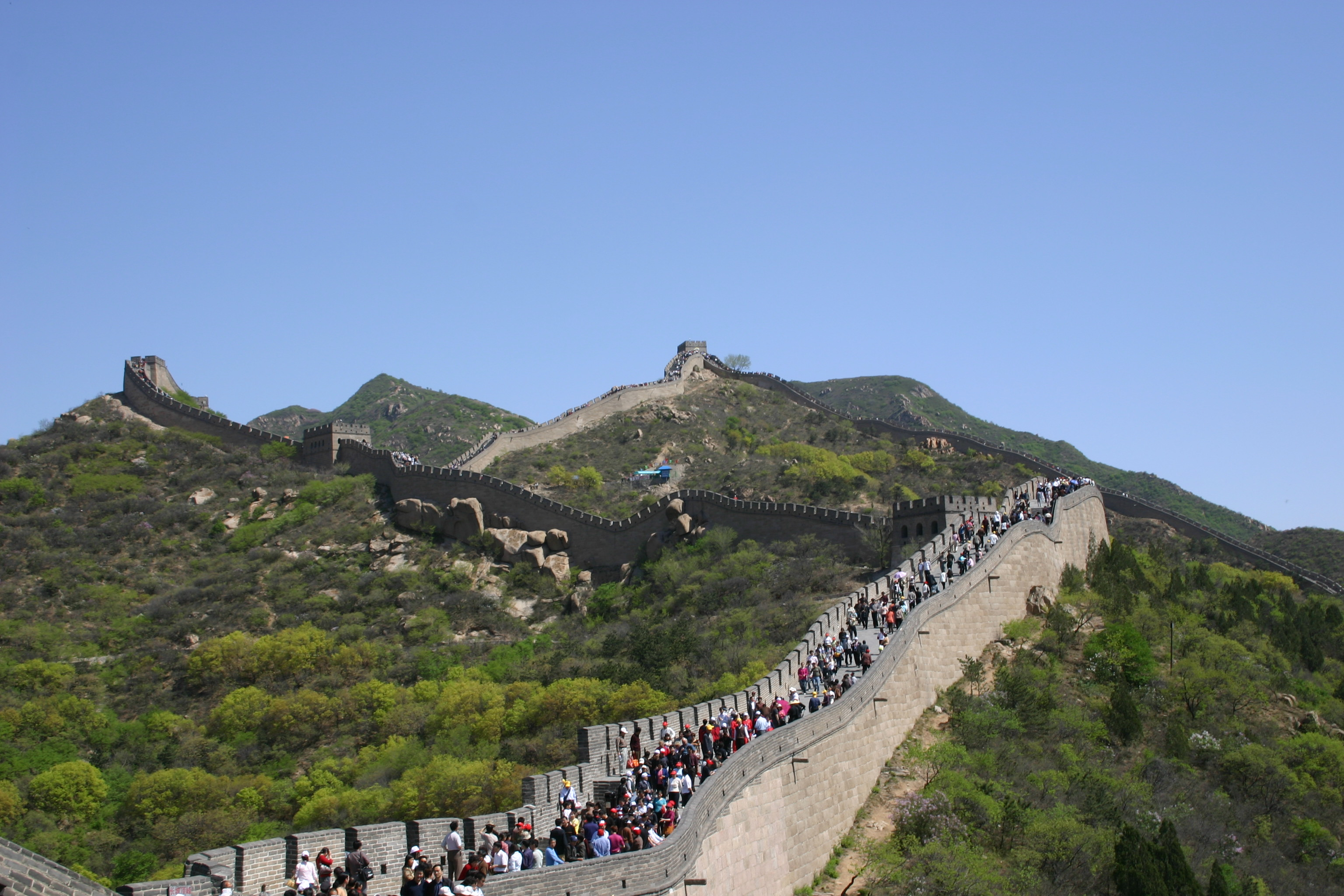
The Great Wall at Badaling, 2004

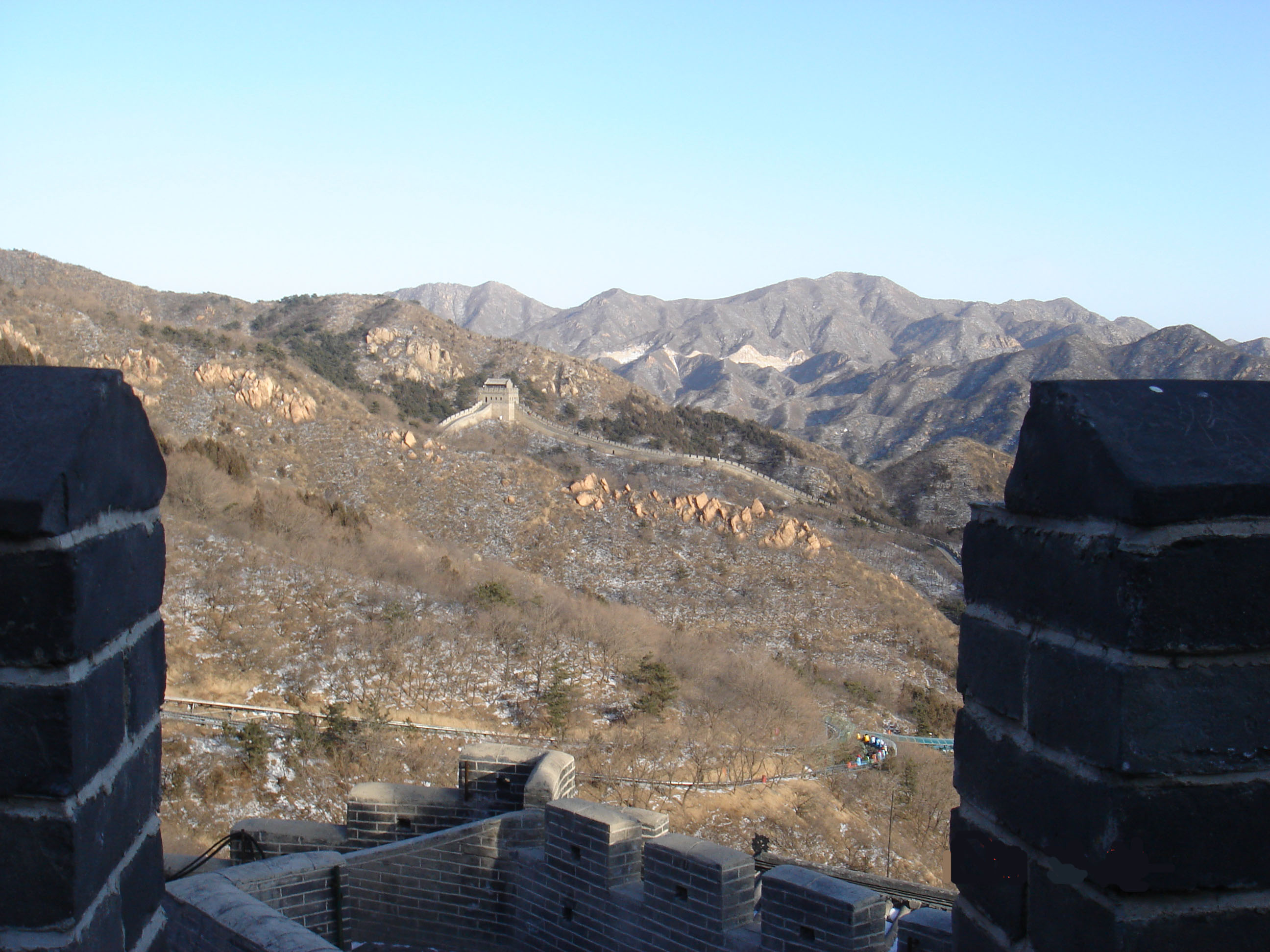
The scenery around Badaling from the Great Wall, 2008

Badaling (Chinese: 八达岭; pinyin: Bādálǐng) is the site of the most visited section of the Great Wall of China, approximately 80 kilometers (50 mi) northwest of Beijing's city center, in Badaling Town, Yanqing District, Beijing municipality. The portion of the wall running through the site was built in 1504 during the Ming Dynasty, along with a military outpost reflecting the location's strategic importance. The highest point of Badaling is Beibalou (北八樓), approximately 1,015 meters (3,330 ft) above sea level.

Badaling Great Wall was built in the Ming Dynasty (1505) to occupy a commanding and strategic position for protecting the Juyong Pass to its south, further protecting the city of Beijing.

The portion of the wall at Badaling has undergone restoration, and in 1957, it was the first section of the wall to open to tourism. Now visited annually by millions, the immediate area has seen significant development, including hotels, restaurants, and a cable car.

== Transport ==
=== Expressway ===
The G6 Badaling Expressway connects Badaling with central Beijing.

=== Railway ===
Two China Railway lines serve Badaling:

- The Beijing-Zhangjiakou intercity railway has CRH high-speed trains running from Beijing North station, stopping at the underground Badaling Great Wall station.
- Line S2 of the Beijing Suburban Railway serves people who want to go to the at-grade Badaling station from Huangtudian station.

=== Bus ===
The 877 bus runs frequently between Deshengmen Bus Station (adjacent to the Jishuitan station on Line 2 and Line 19 of Beijing Subway) and Badaling Great Wall.

== Fame ==
It was here that US President Richard Nixon and his wife Pat Nixon, accompanied by Vice Premier Li Xiannian, visited on 24 February 1972, during his historic journey to China. Many other world leaders have made a trip to the site including Margaret Thatcher, Ronald Reagan and Mikhail Gorbachev.

Badaling and the expressway were the site of the finishing circuit of the Urban Road Cycling Course in the 2008 Summer Olympics. Laps of the circuit passed through gates in the wall.

== Internal traffic ==
=== Funicular ===
Badaling Great Wall Funicular starts from the opposite of Zhan Tianyou Memorial Hall and goes to the fourth floor of the best viewing point of Badaling Great Wall-South.
