= Qinghuayuan =

Qinghuayuan may refer to:

- Tsinghua University
- Qinghuayuan railway station
