= Xiahuayuan North railway station =

Railway station in Hebei, China

Coordinates: 40.5020°N 115.2952°E

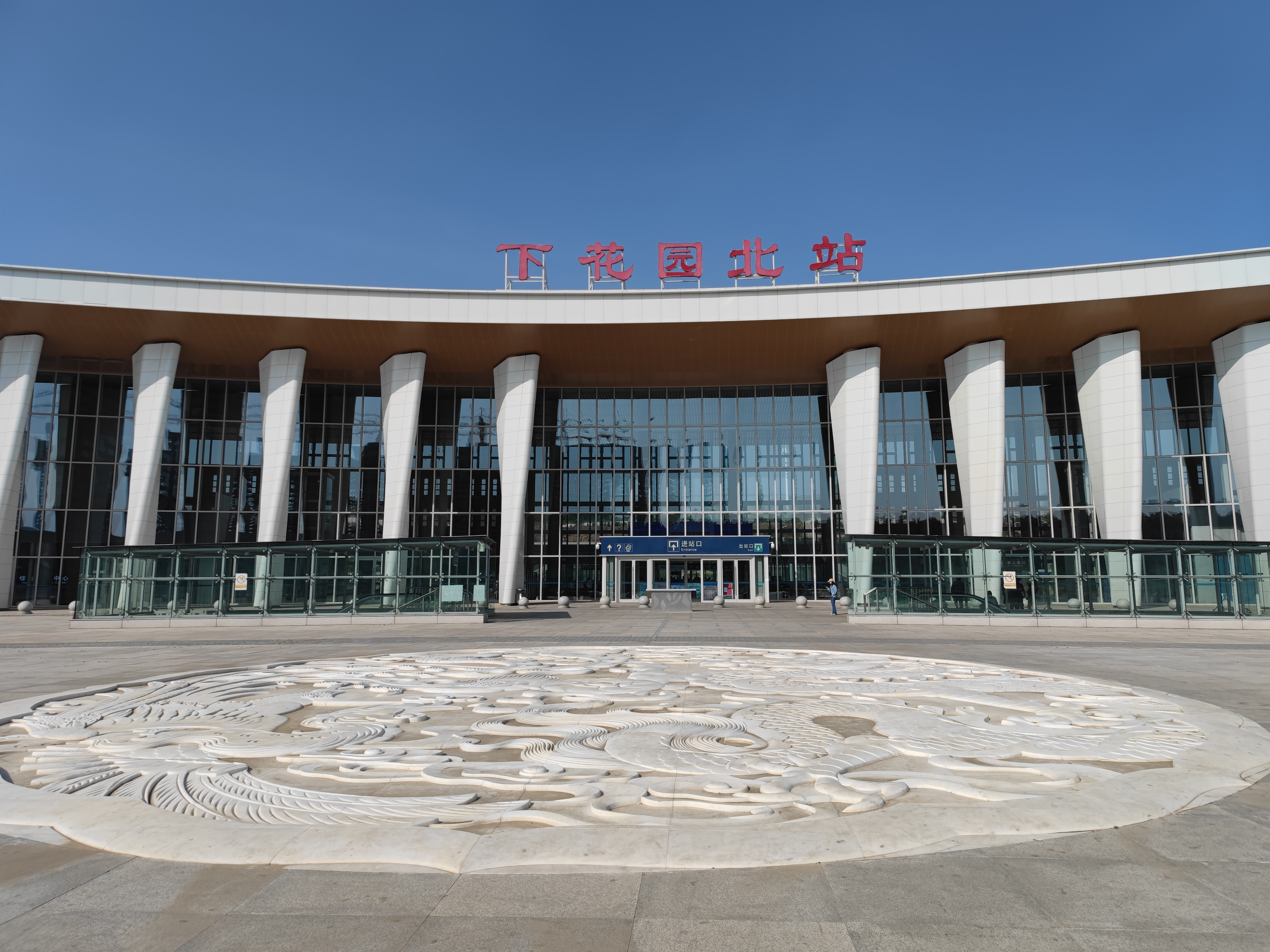
Xiahuayuanbei Railway Station

Xiahuayuan North railway station (Chinese: 下花园北站; pinyin: Xiàhuāyuán Běi zhàn) is a railway station located in People's Republic of China.

It is a station on the Beijing–Zhangjiakou intercity railway, opening on December 30, 2019.

Preceding station	China Railway High-speed	Following station
Huailai towards Beijing North	Beijing–Zhangjiakou intercity railway	Xuanhua North towards Zhangjiakou (opened in 1957)
Taizicheng Terminus	Beijing–Zhangjiakou intercity railway Chongli branch	Terminus
