= Machikou =

Machikou Town 马池口镇
- Town
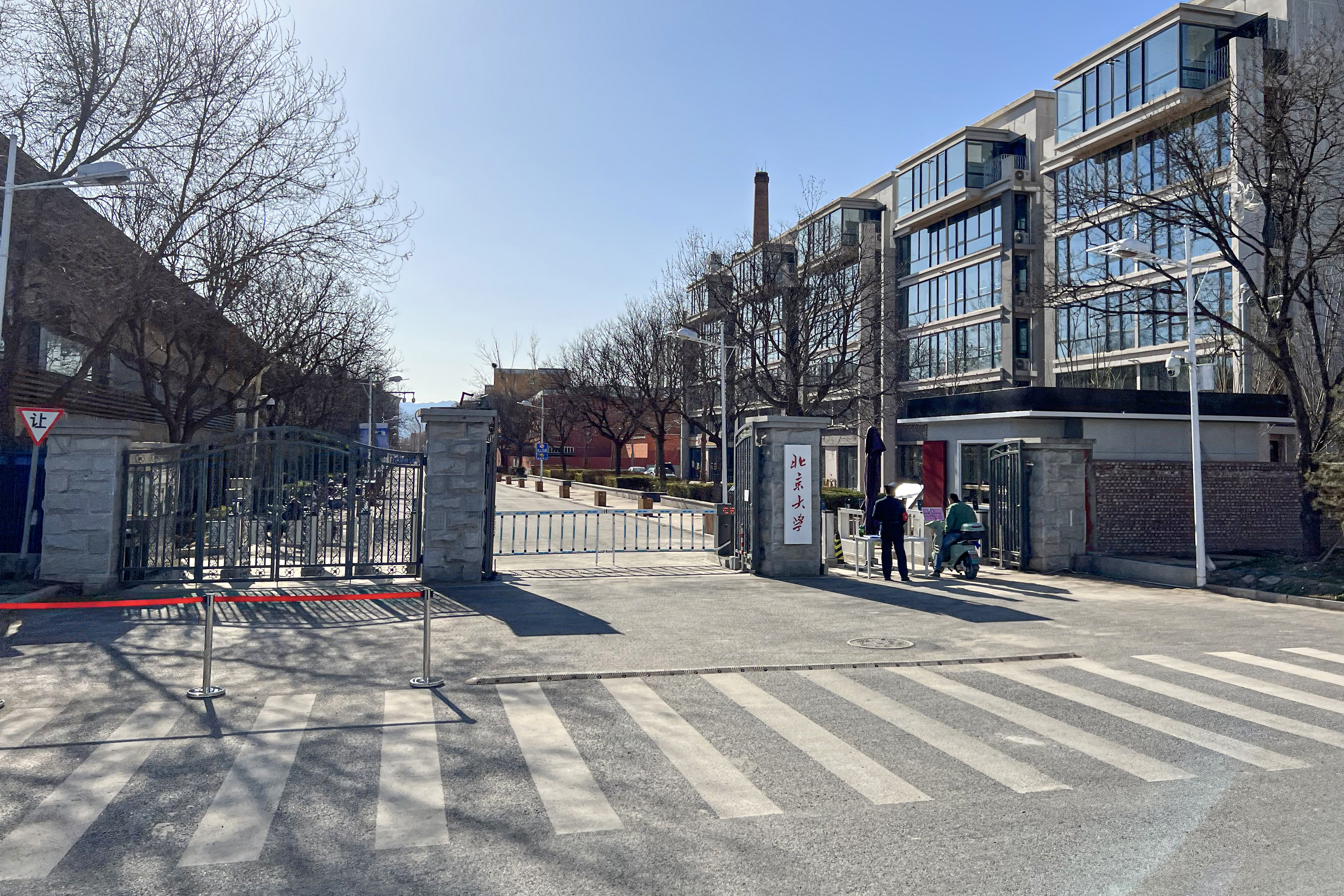
- East Gate, New Changping Campus of Peking University, 2022

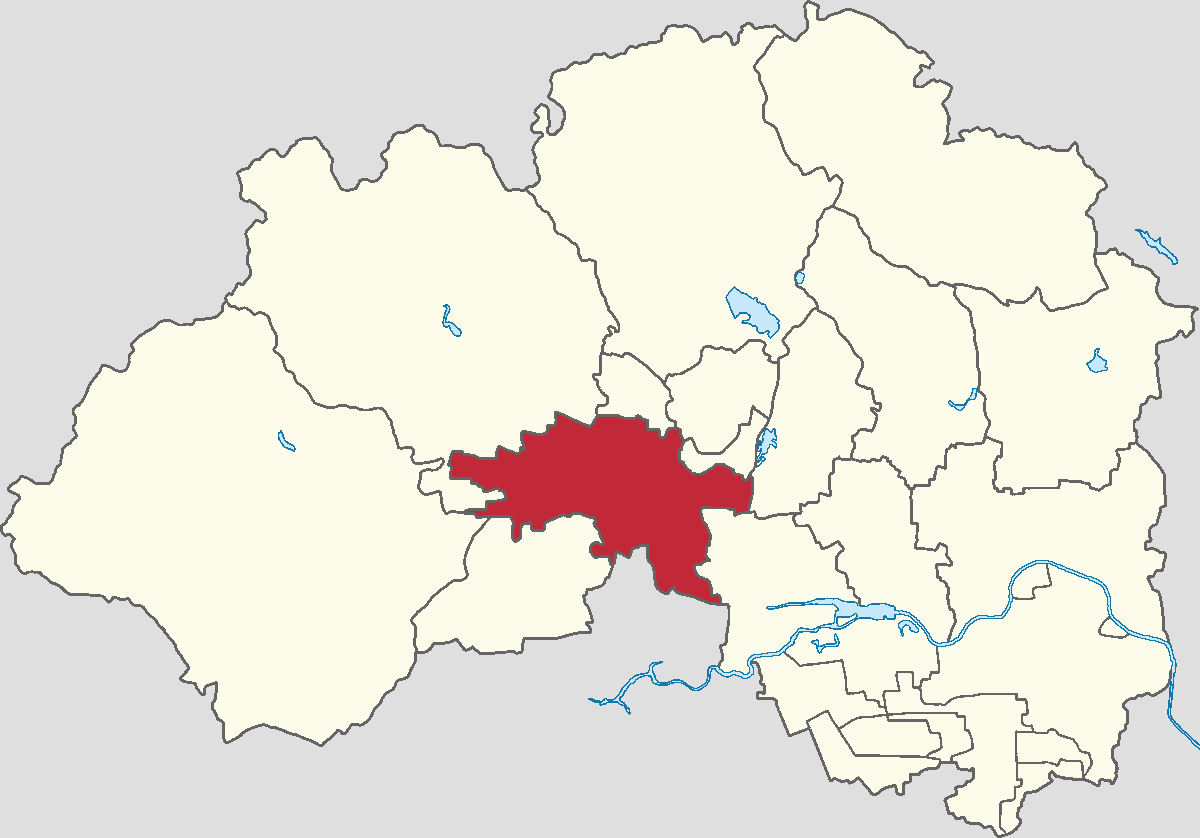
- Location of Machikou Town within Changping District

- Location within Beijing Location within China
- Coordinates: 40°10′59″N 116°09′38″E
- Country: China
- Municipality: Beijing
- District: Changping
- Village-level Divisions: 1 community 21 villages

Area
  - Total: 61.8 km^{2} (23.9 sq mi)
- Elevation: 57 m (187 ft)

Population (2020)
  - Total: 87,506
  - Density: 1,420/km^{2} (3,670/sq mi)
- Time zone: UTC+8 (China Standard)
- Postal code: 102299
- Area code: 010

Machikou Town (Chinese: 马池口镇; pinyin: Mǎchíkǒu Zhèn) is a town inside of Changping District, Beijing, China. Machikou shares border with Chengnan and Chengbei Subdistricts to its north, Nanshao and Shahe Towns to its east, Shangzhuang and Yangfang Towns to its south, and Nankou Town to its west and north. The population for this area was 87,506 as of 2020.

This area's name Machikou (Chinese: 马池口; lit. 'Horse Pool Mouth') is referring to the region's past location as a stopping for trading caravans.

== History ==
Timetable of Machikou's History
| Year | Status | Under |
|---|---|---|
| 1949–1953 | 1st District | Changping County |
| 1953–1956 | Split into 5 townships: Machikou; Baifu; Baiquanzhuang; Shangniantou; Hengqiao | Changping County |
| 1956–1958 | Machikou Township | Changping County |
| 1958–1959 | Machikou Working Station, within Shisanling People's Commune | Changping County |
| 1959–1961 | Machikou Production Team, within Chengguan People's Commune | Changping County |
| 1961–1982 | Machikou People's Commune | Changping County |
| 1982–1990 | Machikou Township | Changping County |
| 1990–1999 | Machikou Town (Merged with part of Tingzizhuang Township in 1997, Tulou and Ge villages in 1998) | Changping County |
| 1999–present | Machikou Town (Merged with part of Tingzizhuang Township in 1997, Tulou and Ge villages in 1998) | Changping District |

== Administrative divisions ==
As of the year 2021, Machikou Town had 22 subdivisions, in which 1 was a community, and 21 were villages:

| Administrative division code | Subdivision names | Name transliterations | Type |
|---|---|---|---|
| 110114003001 | 念头社区 | Niantousheqv | Community |
| 110114003201 | 马池口村 | Machikoucun | Village |
| 110114003202 | 东坨村 | Dongtuocun | Village |
| 110114003203 | 西坨村 | Xituocun | Village |
| 110114003204 | 东闸村 | Dongzhacun | Village |
| 110114003205 | 北庄户村 | Beizhuanghucun | Village |
| 110114003206 | 楼自庄村 | Louzizhaungcun | Village |
| 110114003207 | 土城村 | Tuchengcun | Village |
| 110114003208 | 横桥村 | Hengqiaocun | Village |
| 110114003209 | 白浮村 | Baifucun | Village |
| 110114003210 | 下念头村 | Xianiantoucun | Village |
| 110114003211 | 宏道村 | Hongdaocun | Village |
| 110114003212 | 上念头村 | Shangniantoucun | Village |
| 110114003213 | 百泉庄村 | Baiquanzhuangcun | Village |
| 110114003214 | 奤夿屯村 | Habatuncun | Village |
| 110114003215 | 亭自庄村 | Tingzizhuangcun | Village |
| 110114003216 | 北小营村 | Beixiaoyingcun | Village |
| 110114003217 | 乃干屯村 | Naigantuncun | Village |
| 110114003218 | 丈头村 | Zhangtoucun | Village |
| 110114003219 | 辛店村 | Xindiancun | Village |
| 110114003220 | 土楼村 | Tuloucun | Village |
| 110114003221 | 葛村 | Gecun | Village |

== Gallery ==
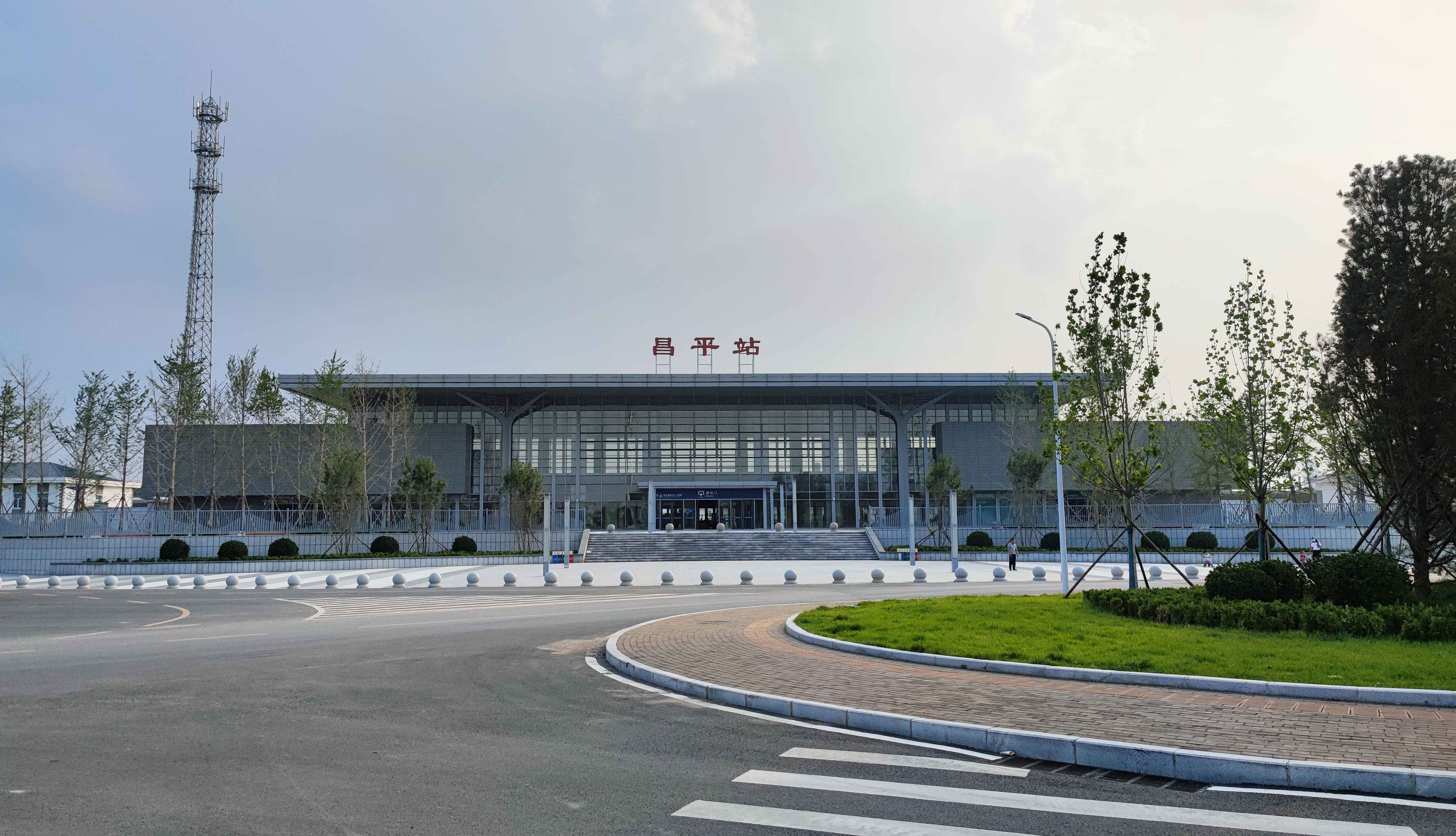
Changping railway station, 2022

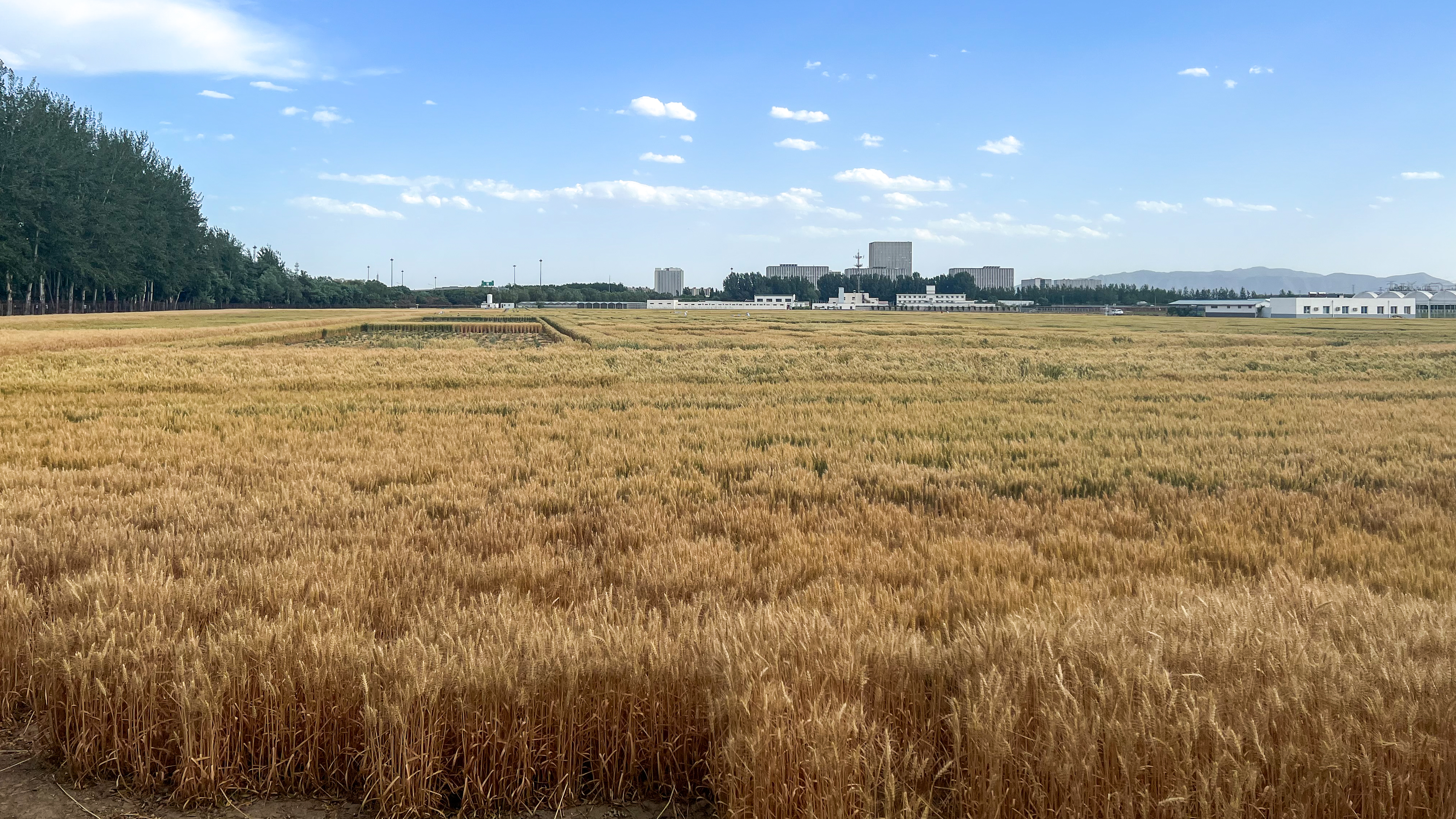
Changping Experimental Base Institute of Crop Sciences, 2022

== See also ==
- List of township-level divisions of Beijing
