= Shahe station =

Shahe station may refer to:

- Shahe railway station, in Changping District, Beijing, China
- Shaheshi railway station, or Shahe City railway station, in Shahe, Xingtai, Hebei Province, China
- Shahe station (Beijing Subway), in Changping District, Beijing, China
- Shahe station (Guangzhou Metro), interchange station on Line 6 and Line 11 of Guangzhou Metro, in Tianhe District, Guangzhou, Guangdong Province, China
