= Taizicheng railway station =

Railway station in Zhangjiakou, China

Taizicheng railway station 太子城站
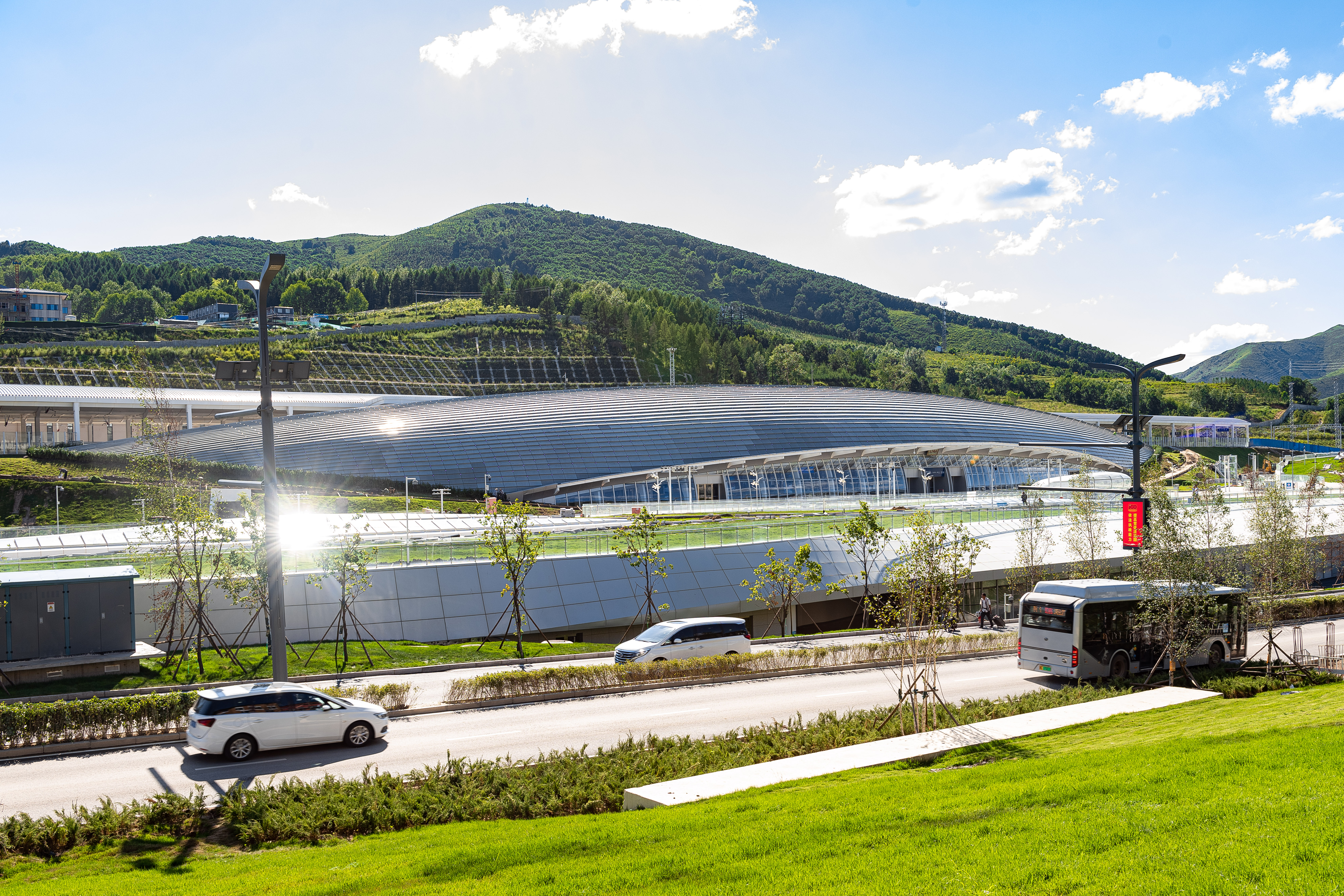
- Taizicheng railway station building

General information
- Location: Taizicheng, Sitaizui Township, Chongli District, Zhangjiakou, Hebei
- Coordinates: 40.9125°N 115.4418°E
- Owner: Jingzhang Intercity Railway Co. Ltd.
- Operator: Zhangjiakou Train Operation Depot, China Railway Beijing Group
- Line: Chongli railway (Branch of Beijing–Zhangjiakou intercity railway)
- Platforms: 1 side platform, 2 island platforms

Construction
- Structure type: in level

Other information
- Station code: 12195 (TMIS); IZP (telegram); TZC (pinyin)

History
- Opened: 30 December 2019
Location

Taizicheng railway station (Chinese: 太子城站; pinyin: tàizǐchéng zhàn), is a railway station in Taizicheng, Chongli District, Zhangjiakou, Hebei. It is the terminal of Chongli railway. The station hall started construction in August 2018 to build a high-speed railway station on the Chongli railway (Olympic branch of Beijing–Zhangjiakou intercity railway) opened on Dec 30, 2019.

== Structure ==
The total floorage of the station is 11,988 square metres (129,040 sq ft), including 5,990 square metres (64,500 sq ft) main station building and 5,998 square metres (64,560 sq ft) underground transfer center. The transfer center will be served as a temporary waiting hall with a railway culture exhibition center and temporary ticket office during the 2022 Olympic period.

Taizicheng station has two island platforms initially. To facilitate the entrance and exit for athletes and media workers, a basic side platform is added, forming a Spanish solution rarely in China Railway.

== Design and construction ==
Taizicheng railway station
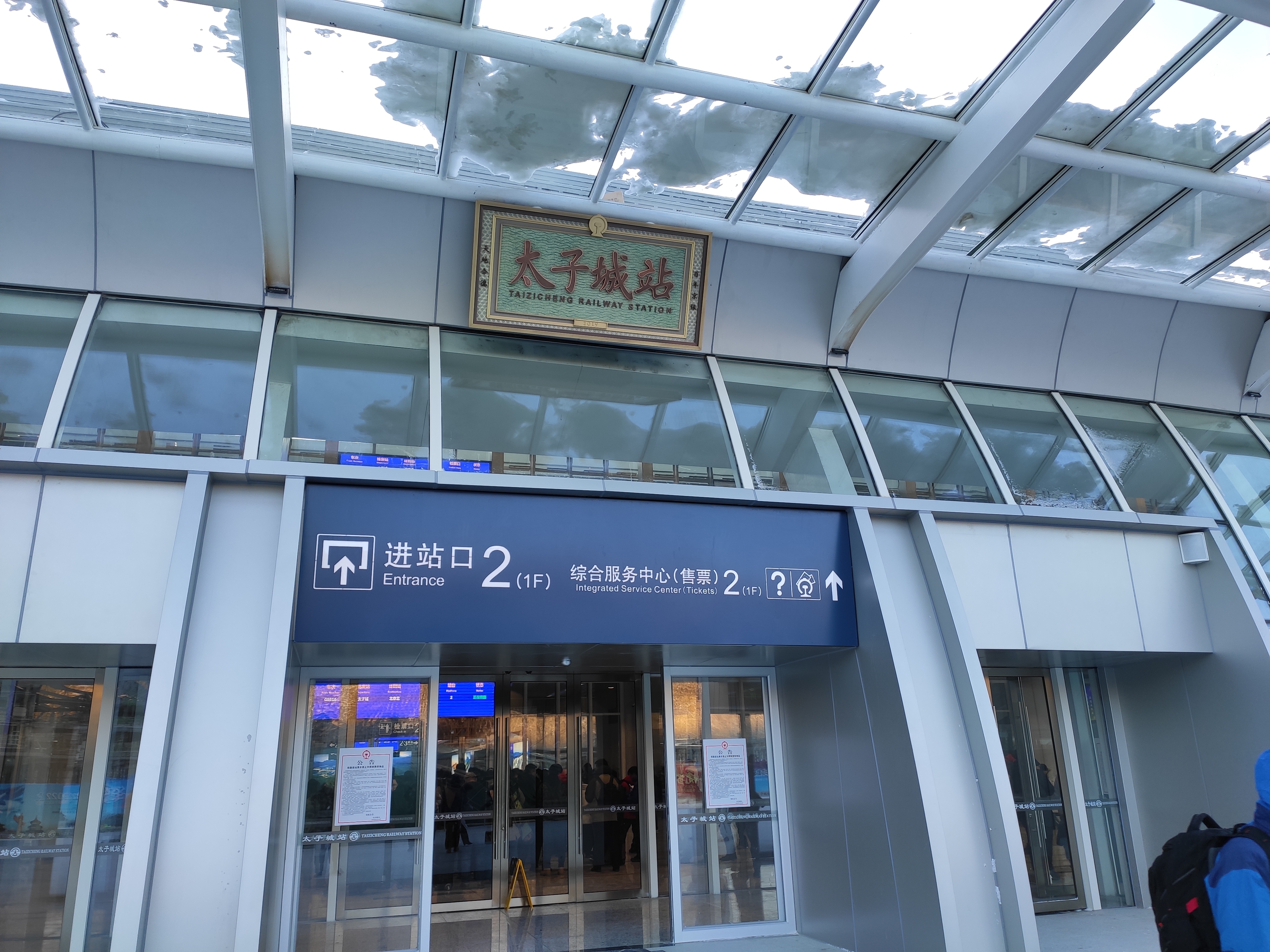
Entrance

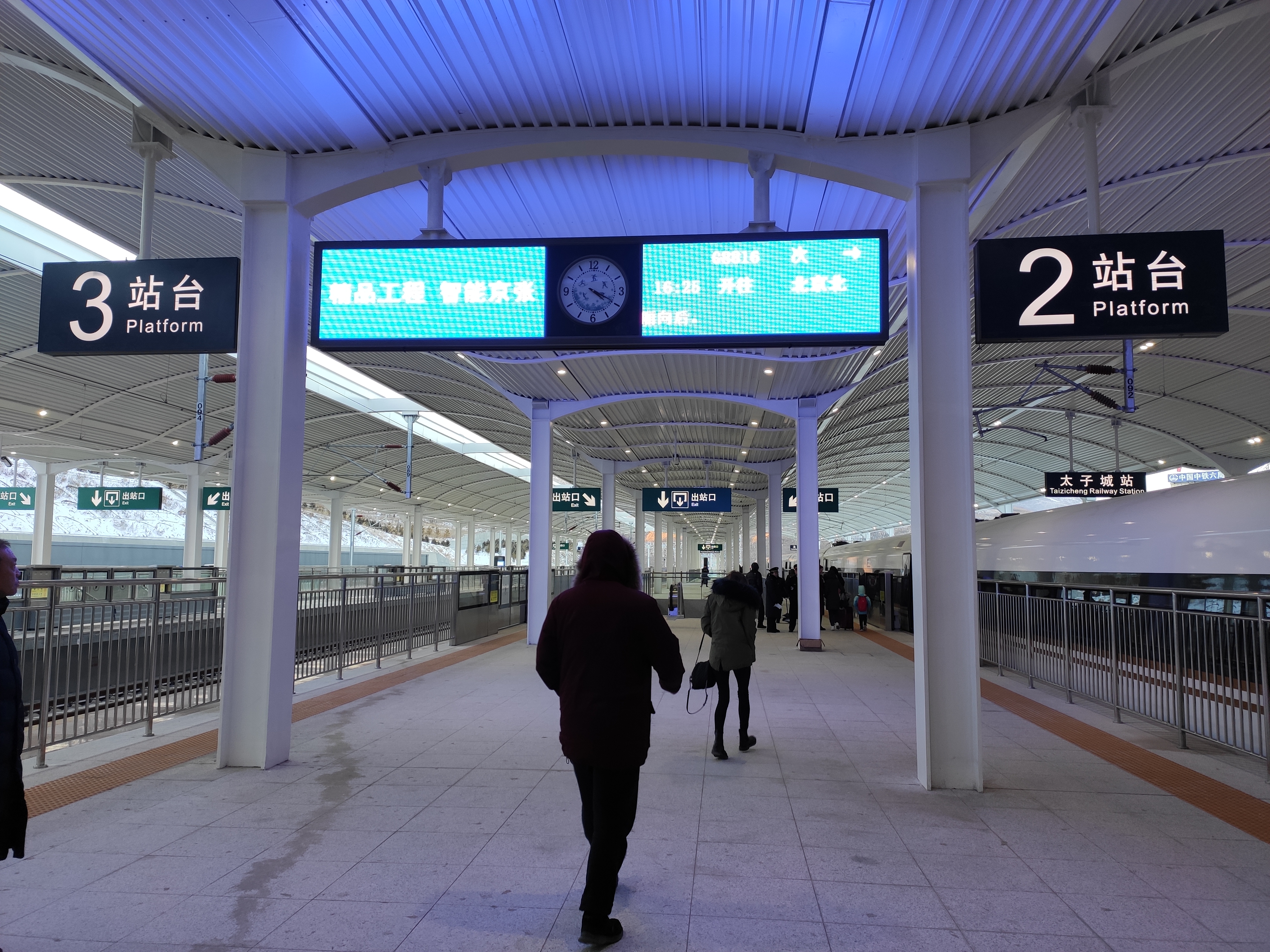
Platform 2-3

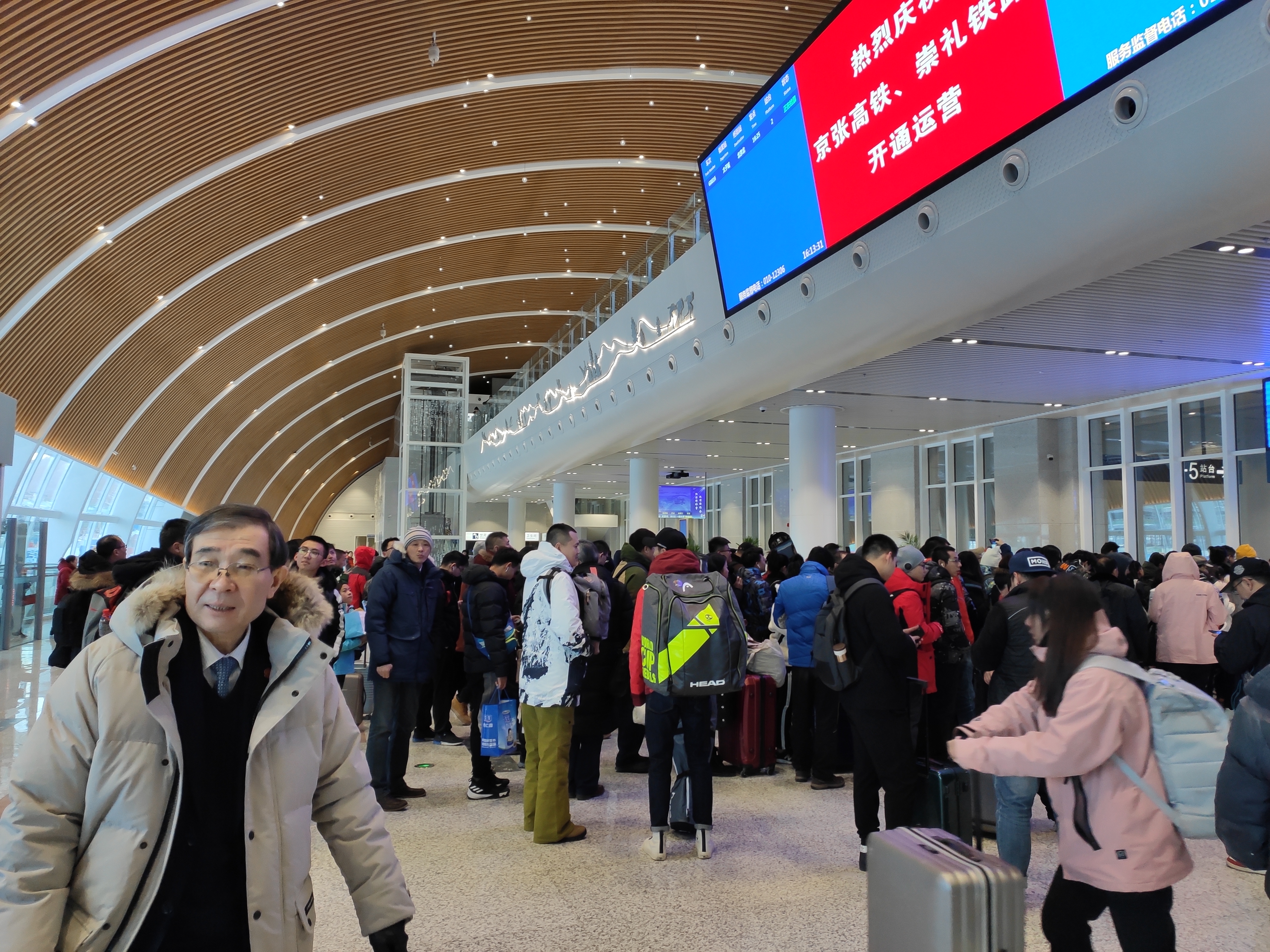
Waiting hall on the first day operation

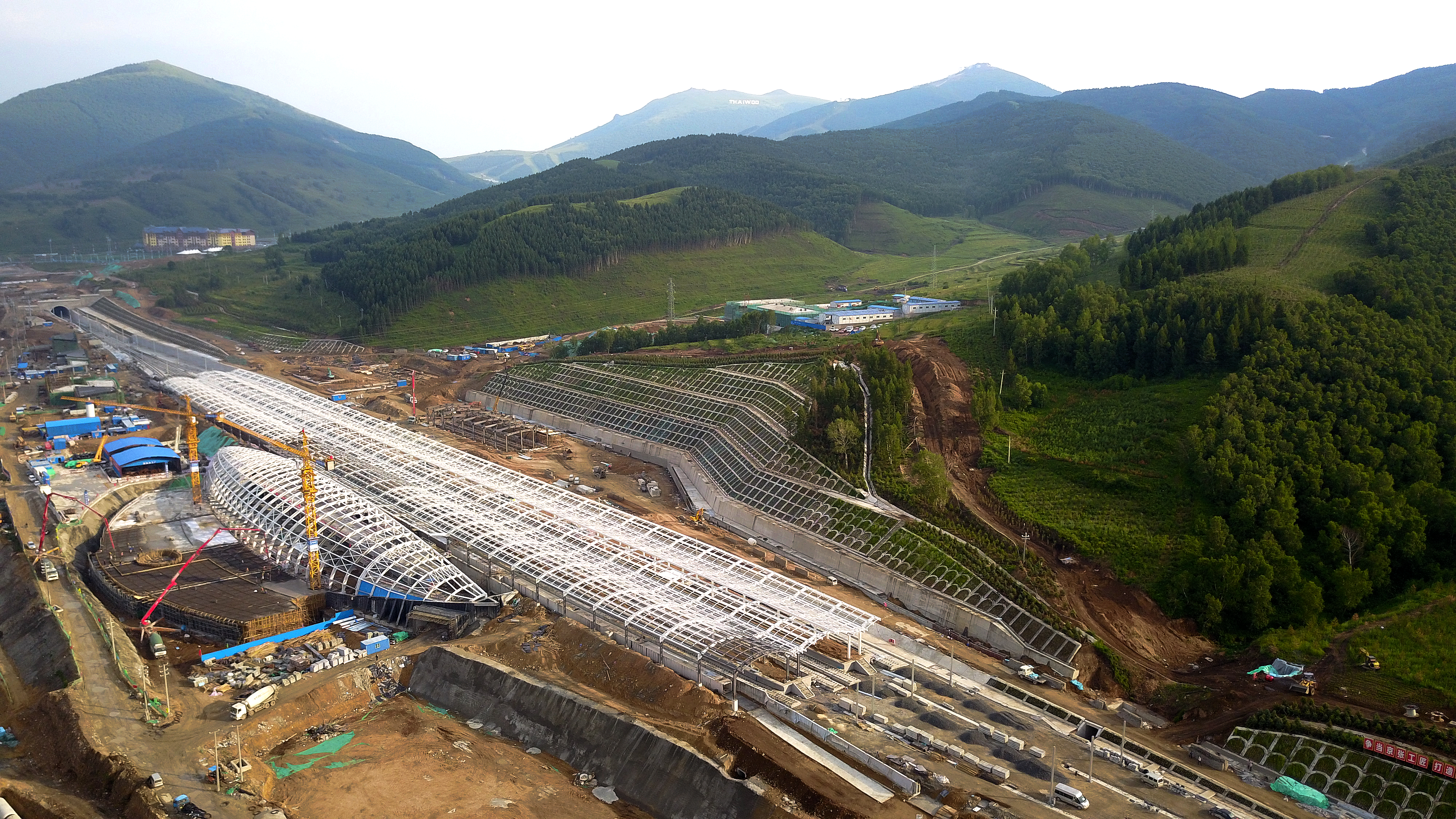
Construction scene in 2019

The architectural design is an image of mountains, with a crescent-shaped hyperbola outline extending to the ground and the main colour of white indicating the Winter Olympics. The 2022 winter Olympic game awarding square is opposite to the station, so this station will be the natural background for award ceremonies witnessing the presentation of 51 gold medals.

This station is designed by China Railway Engineering Consulting Group, and constructed by China Railway 6th Engineering Group. In June 2019, the station building successfully capped its main structure.

== Operation ==
Taizicheng railway station uses an electronic ticket system, in which passengers scan their identity certificates such as ID cards or passports, rather than a traditional magnetic ticket to check-in. The China Railway E Card or dynamic QR code in 12306 app is also applicable in this station.

== Extension ==
Chongli branch of Beijing–Zhangjiakou intercity railway was extended from Taizicheng railway station to Chongli railway station on 6 January 2022. In addition, by constructing or rebuilding railway lines the line is planned to end in Xilinhot. The railway between Taizicheng and Xilinhot is also called Taizicheng–Xilinhot railway.

== See also ==
- Beijing–Zhangjiakou intercity railway
- Beijing North railway station

Preceding station	China Railway High-speed	Following station
Terminus	Beijing–Zhangjiakou intercity railway Chongli branch	Xiahuayuan North Terminus
