= Line S2 (BCR) =

Railway line in Beijing, China

- S2
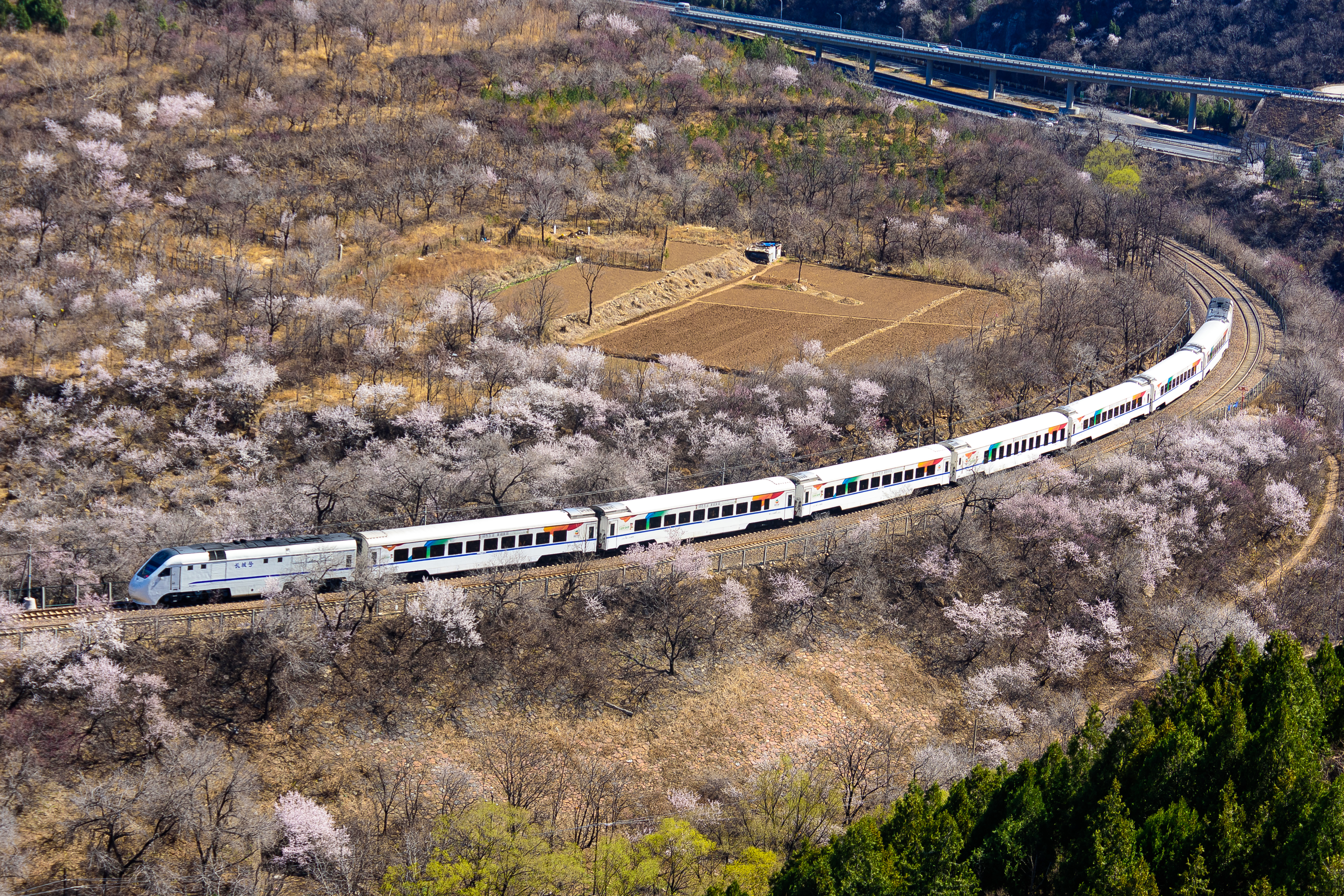
- NDJ3 train at Juyongguan

Overview
- Status: Operational
- Termini: Huangtudian; Yanqing or Shacheng
- Stations: 5

Service
- Type: Commuter rail
- System: Beijing Suburban Railway (BCR)
- Operator(s): China Railway Beijing Group
- Rolling stock: NDJ3

History
- Opened: August 6, 2008; 17 years ago

Technical
- Line length: 108.3 km (main line + branch line)
- Track gauge: 1,435 mm (4 ft 8 1/2 in)
- Operating speed: 160 km/h

Line S2 of Beijing Suburban Railway (BCR) (simplified Chinese: 北京市郊铁路S2线; traditional Chinese: 北京市郊鐵路S2線; pinyin: Běijīng Shìjiāo Tiělù S Èr Xiàn) is a commuter rail line in Beijing. The main line runs from Huangtudian railway station in Changping District to Yanqing railway station in Yanqing District, following the old Beijing–Baotou railway, and provides faster, more frequent and convenient service than preexisting trains. The line is 108.3 kilometres (67.3 mi) in length (main line + branch line). The train locomotives are marked "Great Wall" (Chinese: 长城号; pinyin: Chángchéng Hào).

== Stations ==
		Station №	Station Name		Connections	Distance km		Location	Section
		Station №	English	Chinese	Connections	Distance km		Location	Section
●	●	HKP	Huangtudian	黄土店	( 8 13 via Huoying)	0	0	Changping	Beijing Northeast Ring railway
○	○	CPP	Changping	昌平		21	21	Changping	Jingbao railway
●	●	NKP	Nankou	南口		9	30	Changping	Jingbao railway
●	●	ILP	Badaling	八达岭		21	51	Yanqing	Jingbao railway
｜	●	YNP	Yanqing	延庆		21	72	Yanqing	Kangyan railway
●		KZP	Kangzhuang	康庄		9	60	Yanqing	Jingbao railway
●		SCP	Shacheng	沙城		35	95	Huailai (Zhangjiakou, Hebei)	Jingbao railway

== Operation ==
Trains can reach a maximum speed of 160 kilometres per hour (99 mph). A trip from Huangtudian to the Badaling Great Wall takes about 1 hour and 22 minutes. Since 1 December 2020 there have been five services each way from Friday to Monday and on public holidays. On other days there are three services. Tickets can be purchased from ticket offices of stations along route on the day of travel only. The Beijing Transit card is accepted on this route. Train identification numbers are prefixed with the letter 'S'. The line primarily serves tourists traveling to the Great Wall of China at Badaling.

Line S2 uses the NDJ3 diesel multiple unit marked "Great Wall" (Chinese: 长城号; pinyin: Chángchéng Hào) in a seven-car push-pull configuration (L+7T+L). Accommodation comes in 'soft-seat' class only with a 2+2 (first class) or 3+2 (second class) layout. The seats were reversible, but that feature has been removed. Between Nankou and Badaling stations, the train makes a reversal at a switch-back junction. Although all stations are equipped with high-level platforms, trains are equipped with retractable steps and can also serve low-level platforms. On-board facilities include air-conditioning and heating, toilets, hot-water dispensers and a cafe-bar selling tea, coffee, soft drinks, beer and snacks. Smoking is not permitted on the train.

=== Ticket ===
The ticket pricing of Line S2 in Beijing administrative region is the same as that of Beijing Subway network, and 10 CNY fee is added in the interval of Kangzhuang - Shacheng. For example, the ticket price of Huangtudian - Shacheng is 18 CNY. Special half-price ticket of children and disabled soldiers is only sold in station ticket offices. Users of traffic cards issued in Beijing and users of QR code of Yitongxing mobile app enjoy the same preferential policy of Beijing Subway accumulated consumption discount. The ticket is not sold online. Passengers do not need to register with their real name. Seating is on a first-come, first-serve basis. Passengers can pay the fare by Beijing Yikatong farecard, other farecards of China T-Union standard, QR code generated by Yitongxing mobile app, or purchasing ticket in station ticket offices by cash. Passengers have to show the ticket or tap the farecard or scan the QR code while getting in and leaving the stations.
