= Yanqing railway station =

Railway station in Beijing, China

Coordinates: 40.4347°N 115.9780°E

Yanqing 延庆
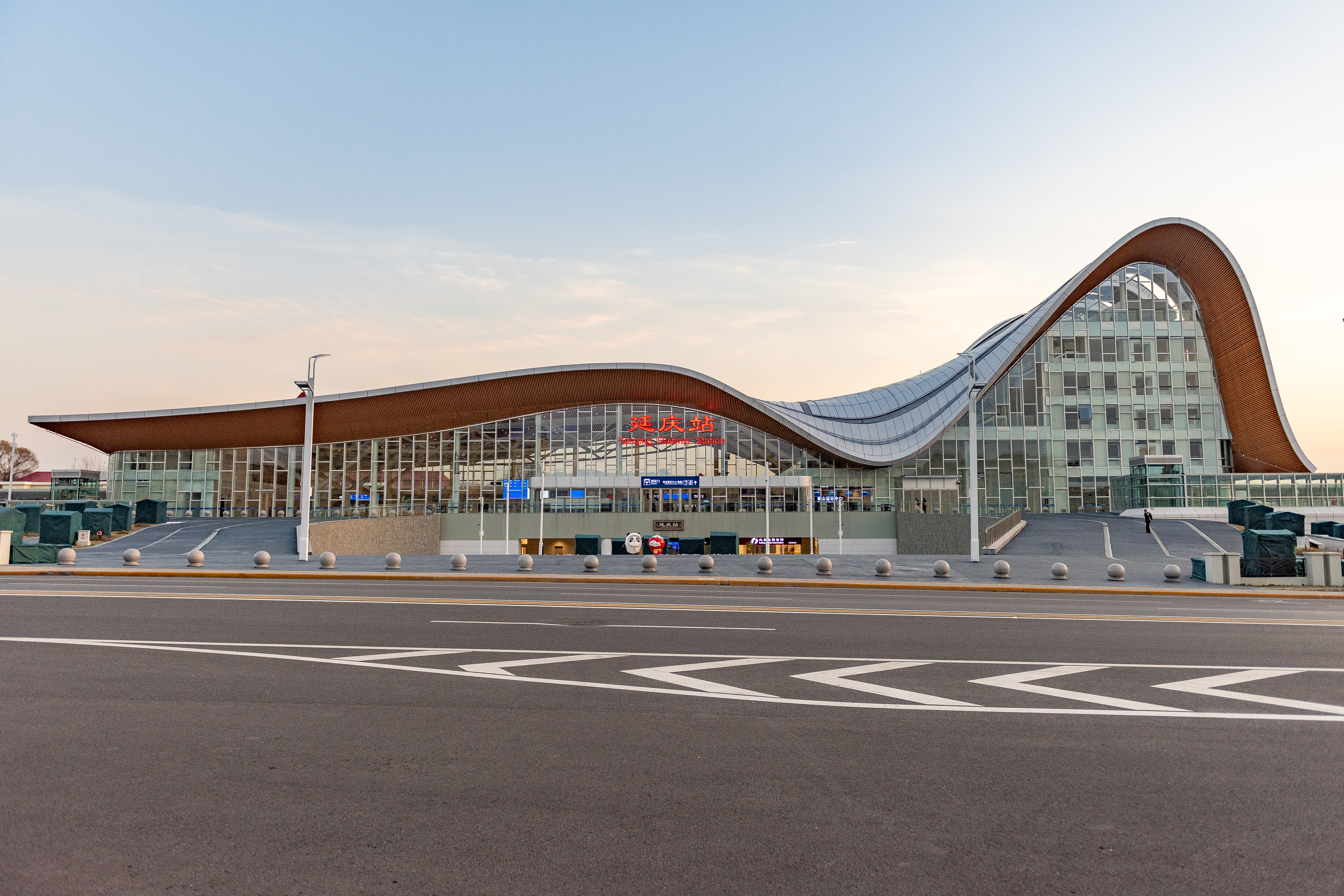

General information
- Location: Yanqing District, Beijing; China
- Lines: Line S2; Beijing–Zhangjiakou intercity railway (Yanqing branch)
- Platforms: 3 (1 island platform, 2 side platforms)

Other information
- Station code: TMIS code: 12224; Telegraph code: YNP; Pinyin code: YQI

History
- Opened: 29 November 1983 (old station hall); 1 December 2020 (new station hall)

Services
Preceding station	Beijing Suburban Railway	Following station
Badaling towards Huangtudian	Line S2	Terminus
Location

Yanqing railway station (simplified Chinese: 延庆站; traditional Chinese: 延慶站; pinyin: Yánqìng zhàn) is the terminus of the Yanqing branch of the Line S2 of the Beijing Suburban Railway. Yanqing railway station was used as a freight station since 1983, and in 2003 it closed due to the fall of shipments. In 2008, the station finished its first renovation and resumed passenger services. From 2019, a new station hall began construction for the coming Winter Olympics. Since 1 December 2020, The new station hall as well as Yanqing branch of Beijing–Zhangjiakou intercity railway begin serve the station.

== Design ==
Yanqing railway station has been expanded for several major events hosted by Yanqing District. An upgrade of the bus transportation hub has been conducted for the Expo 2019 Horticultural Exhibition and the 2022 Winter Olympic Games, whose alpine events will be hosted in Yanqing District. The whole construction site covers an area of 65,818 m^{2} (708,460 sq ft), and its gross construction area is 14,951.14 m^{2} (160,932.7 sq ft). The design of the facade image is inspired by both the local landscape, and Alpine skiing represented in the use of metal roof. The overall design scheme is defined as lofty mountains and flowing water, metaphos to the Yanqing welcomes the guests from all over the world. In the decoration design, the main elements are the Winter Olympics, the Great Wall and Yanqing local culture. The highly representative cultural symbols in Yanqing such as Mountain Haituo, Badaling and Xiadu Bridge have been applied to the relievo in the exit hall and waiting hall.

== Services and Structure ==
The station contains a concourse, an integrated service center, ticket vending machines, a convenience store and two check-in gates. Outside the new station hall is Yanqing integrated transportation hub include a visitors service center, a bus terminus, charging stations, and parking lots for vehicles and sharing bicycles. In December 2020, 5 pairs of high-speed trains and 3 pairs of Line S2 trains serve here.

Mezzanine	Business floor (not yet open)
1F	side platform, open left doors
1F	Platform 4	Yanqing railway to Beijing urban area （Badaling/Badaling Great Wall）→
1F	Platform 3	Yanqing railway to Beijing urban area （Badaling/Badaling Great Wall）→
1F	island platform
1F	Platform 2	Yanqing railway to Beijing urban area （Badaling/Badaling Great Wall）→
1F	Platform 1	Yanqing railway to Beijing urban area （Badaling/Badaling Great Wall）→
1F	side platform, open right doors
	Integrated service center, security check, washrooms, waiting hall, Check-in Gate 1 (for intercity train), Check-in Gate 2 (for S2), north square (Yanqing public transportation hub), ~~south square~~
GF	underpass, exit, visitors service center, bus terminus, taxi stands
