= Beijing North railway station =

Railway station in Beijing, China

Beijingbei 北京北
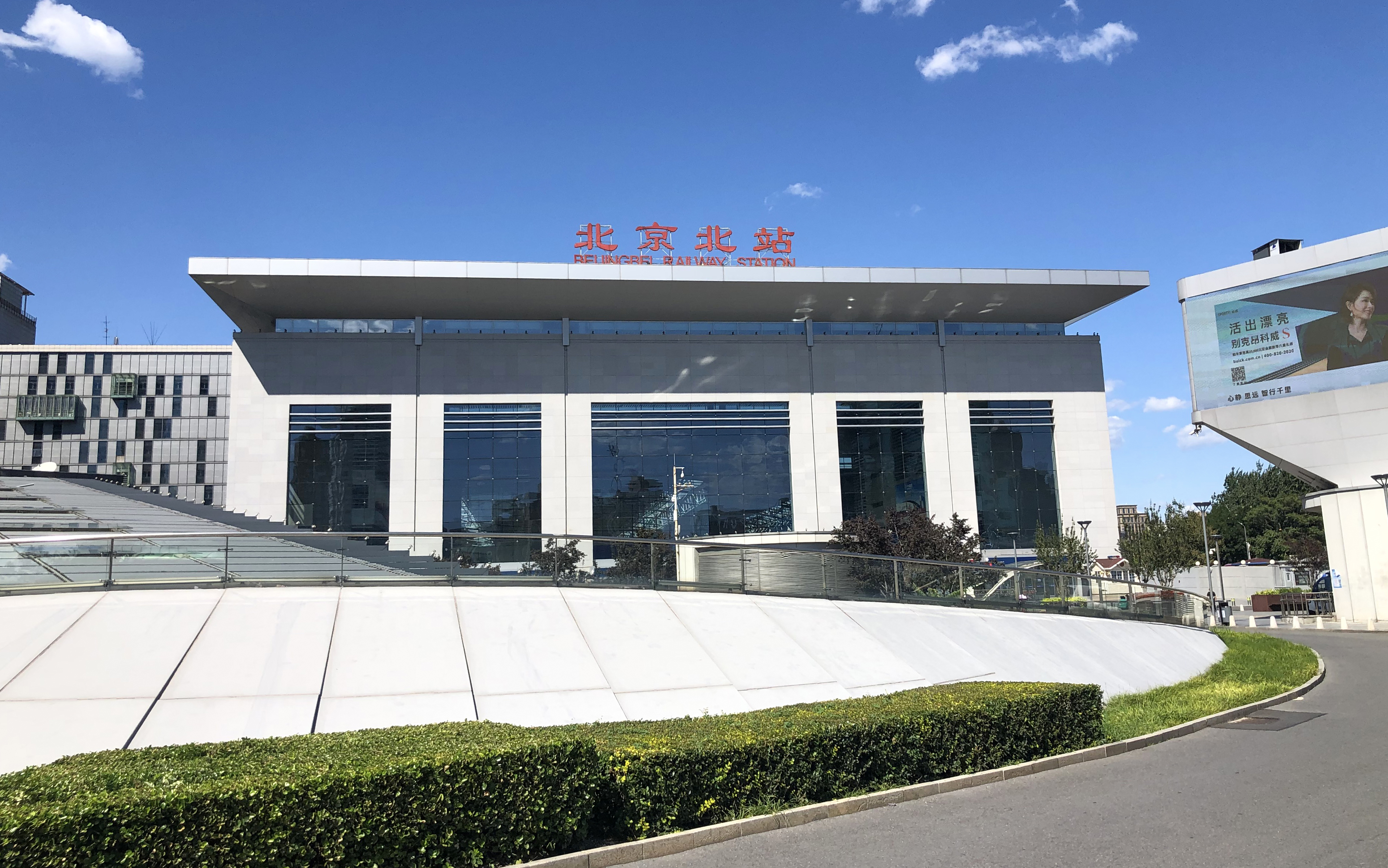
- Beijing North Railway Station

General information
- Other names: Beijing North
- Location: Xicheng District, Beijing; China
- Coordinates: 39°56′43″N 116°20′50″E
- Operator: China Railway Corporation
- Lines: Beijing–Baotou railway; Beijing–Zhangjiakou intercity railway
- Platforms: 11 (5 island platforms, 1 side platform)
- Connections: Xizhimen station

Other information
- Station code: TMIS code: 12713; Telegraph code: VAP; Pinyin code: BJB

History
- Opened: 1906; 120 years ago
- Former names: Xizhimen railway station

Services
Preceding station	China Railway	Following station
Terminus	Beijing–Zhangjiakou intercity railway	Qinghe towards Zhangjiakou, Yanqing or Taizicheng
Preceding station	Beijing Suburban Railway	Following station
Terminus	Huairou–Miyun line	Qinghe towards Gubeikou
Location
- Location within Beijing

Beijingbei (Beijing North) railway station (Chinese: 北京北站; pinyin: Běijīngběi Zhàn), formerly known as Xizhimen railway station (simplified Chinese: 西直门站; traditional Chinese: 西直門站; pinyin: Xīzhímén Zhàn), is a railway station in Beijing. It was built in 1905 as one of the original stations on the Jingzhang railway (part of the old Beijing–Baotou railway).

On October 31, 2016, the station closed for renovation. On December 30, 2019, the station became the terminus of the high-speed Beijing–Zhangjiakou intercity railway, which is a section of Beijing-Baotou passenger-dedicated line.

== Renovation ==
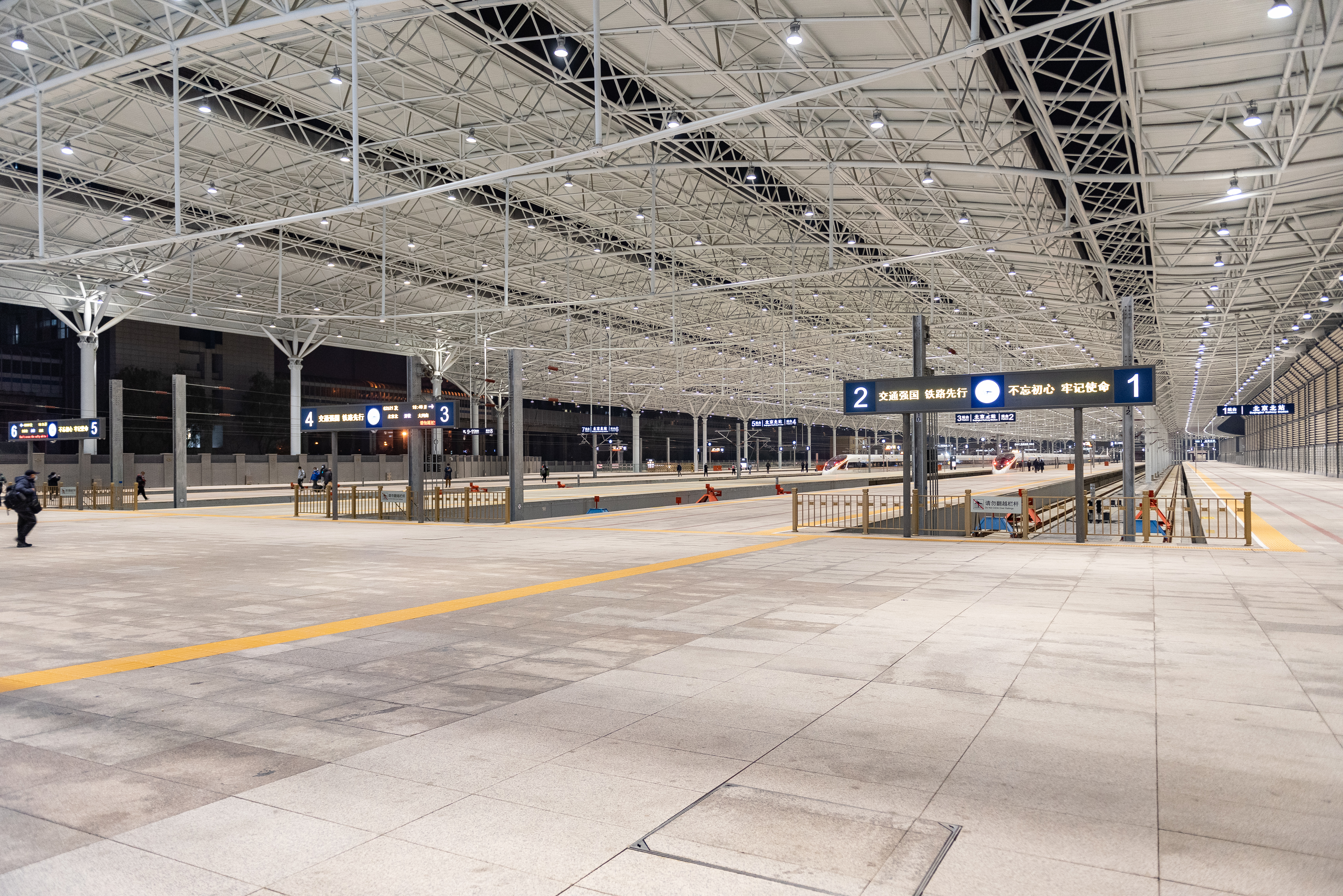
Platforms at Beijing North railway station, 2020

The station was closed from November 1, 2016 to December 30, 2019 for renovation. After the renovation began, the Line S2 terminus changed to Huangtudian railway station and the terminus for all other China Railway trains changed to Changping North railway station. From September 30, 2020, Beijing North railway station became the southern terminus of Huairou–Miyun line.

== Public transportation ==
=== Beijing Subway ===
Beijing North railway station is located just outside Xizhimen station on Line 2, Line 4 and Line 13 of the Beijing Subway.

=== Bus ===
It is also connected to Beijing bus lines 16, 26, 85, 87, 438, 651 and 运通105.
