= Tangshan–Baotou railway =

Railway line in China

Overview
- Native name: 唐包铁路
- Status: In operation
- Owner: China Railway
- Locale: Hebei, Inner Mongolia
- Termini: Caofeidian North, Tangshan; Baotou

Service
- Type: Heavy rail
- System: China Railway High-speed
- Operator(s): CR Beijing, CR Hohhot

Technical
- Line length: 1,013 km (629 mi)
- Number of tracks: 2 (Double-track)
- Track gauge: 1,435 mm (4 ft 8 1/2 in) standard gauge
- Electrification: 25 kV 50 Hz AC (Overhead line)
- Operating speed: 120 km/h (75 mph) (Tangshan–Zhangjiakou section) 160 km/h (99 mph) (Zhangjiakou–Jining section) 100 km/h (62 mph) (Jining–Baotou section)
- Signalling: ABS

The Tangshan–Baotou railway (referred to in Chinese as the Tangbao Railway for short) is a railway connecting Tangshan, Hebei Province and Baotou, Inner Mongolia, China. It starts from Tangshan in the east, passes through Chengde and Zhangjiakou in Hebei, Ulanqab and Hohhot in Inner Mongolia, and ends in Baotou in the west. The Tangshan–Baotou railway connects with the Hohhot–Zhungar railway and other railways to form another major coal-transport railway route in the north after the Datong–Qinhuangdao railway.

== Route ==
=== Tangshan–Baotou (Tanghu) railway period ===
The Tanghu Railway is composed of the former Kongjiazhuang–Tangshan (Zhangtang) railway, Zhangjiakou–Jining (Zhangji) railway and the Jining–Baotou railway from Guyingpan station to Taigemu station (south of Hohot on the Beijing–Baotou railway), with a total length of 852.419 km (529.669 mi). It started from Caofeidian North station in the east and ends at Taigemu station in the west. The property owner of the section from Caofeidian North station (exclusive) to Taobuqi station is the Mengji Railway Company. The section from Caofeidian North station (exclusive) to Youyi Shuiku station (exclusive) is operated (managed) by the Beijing Railway Group, and the section from Youyi Shuiku station to Taigemu station is operated (including management) by the Hohhot Railway Group.

=== Tangshan–Baotou railway period ===
In order to improve transportation efficiency and solve the conflicts between passenger and freight trains, a diversion and reconstruction project was carried out on the west side of Hulu Station from July to September 2020. Due to the line changes caused by this project, on 11 October of the same year, the Kongjiazhuang–Tangshan line, Zhangjiakou–Jining line and the Jining–Baotou railway between Guyingpan and Hulu (i.e. the Tangshan–Baotou Line between Caofeidian North and Hulu) and the original Beijing–Baotou line between Hulu and Baotou were merged to form the Tangshan–Baotou railway, with a freight mileage of 1,013 km (629 mi). The original section of the Tangshan–Baotou line from Hulu to Taigemu became part of the reorganised Beijing–Baotou line.

== History ==
The line between Jining South (then known as Pingchiquan) and Baotou was built as part of the line now called the Beijing–Baotou railway. Construction of the 240.3 km (149.3 mi)–long Fengzhen–Suiyuan section began in August 1919. On 1 May 1921, the entire line was completed and renamed the Beiping–Guisui railway (after the then current names for Beijing and Hohhot) or Pingsui railway.

Only five months after the opening of the Beiping–Guisui railway, the 149.6 km (93.0 mi) Suiyuan–Baotou section began to be built. The line runs westward from Suiyuan, between the southern foot of the Yin Mountains and the Dahei River, passing through Bikeqi, Chasuqi, Taosihao, Salaqi to Baotou (now Baotou East) station. It was completed and opened to traffic in January 1923, at which point the entire line was completed, with a total length of 817.9 km (508.2 mi).

=== Zhangjiakou–Jining railway ===
This line was planned and partly constructed during the second five-year plan period at the beginning of the founding of the People's Republic of China. The purpose of building the line was to shorten the transport distance between Zhangjiakou and Jining, reduce the volume of freight traffic on the Beijing–Baotou railway and shorten the distance by 111 km (69 mi) compared to running via Datong. Construction preparations began in early 1958. The original planned route was to start from the west of Guoleizhuang station on the Beijing–Baotou railway, separate from the Beijing–Baotou railway, and pass through Yangjiaogou, Xinghe to Jining South station. The route between Guoleizhuang and Yangjiaogou passes through the terrace on the left bank of the Yanghe river, and the terrain is relatively flat. The route between Yangjiaogou and Xinghe enters the steep mountainous area on the left bank of the Yanghe river valley. The route between Xinghe and Jining passes through the hilly area of the Mongolian Plateau, and the terrain is relatively flat. Due to the Sino-Soviet split, all construction work was suspended in May 1959.

At the beginning of the 21st century, the route was replanned and changed to start from Zhangjiakou South station (now Zhangjiakou station) on the Beijing–Baotou railway, and use the existing line to the east of Kongjiazhuang. After completing the transfer of passenger and freight traffic between the Zhangjiakou–Jining railway and Beijing–Baotou railway, it turns northwest and enteres Inner Mongolia through Wanquan County and Shangyi County in Hebei Province. Then it passes through Xinghe County and Chahar Right Front Banner in Inner Mongolia, and runs parallel to the existing Beijing-Baotou Railway to enter Guyingpan and end at Jining South. Construction started on 1 May 2006 and was originally scheduled to open to traffic on 31 October 2009. However, due to the difficulty of constructing the 9,585 m (31,447 ft)-long Jiubao Tunnel in Hebei Province, the completion time was postponed and it was opened on 28 April 2011. The total length of the line is 178.08 km (110.65 mi), of which 13.516 km (8.398 mi) formed part of the existing line, 164.56 km (102.25 mi) was newly built, and 5.04 km (3.13 mi) are relocated freight transfer tracks. The total investment of the project was 3.36 billion yuan.

The transportation distance between Zhangjiakou and Jining was shortened by 126 km (78 mi) compared to the original route via Datong on the Beijing–Baotou railway, and passenger train running time was shortened by up to 3.5 hours. Since 10 April 2018, all ordinary passenger trains have returned to the original Beijing–Baotou railway route via Datong.

=== Zhangjiakou–Tangshan railway ===
The planned total length of the Zhangjiakou–Tangshan railway is 528 km (328 mi), with a total investment of 40.001 billion yuan. The project started on 21 March 2010, with a planned construction period of 4.5 years. There are 17 stations along the line, 174 bridges totalling 137 km (85 mi), and 85 tunnels totalling 230 km (140 mi), with 65% of the line consisting of bridges or tunnels. The entire line was completed and opened to traffic on 30 December 2015, and partial passenger services (Chengde–Fengrun section) were launched on 14 May 2016. However, there is now no station on the Zhangjiakou–Tangshan line that is served by passenger services.
