= Jining–Baotou railway =

Railway line in China

Overview
- Native name: 集包铁路第二双线
- Status: In operation
- Owner: China Railway
- Locale: Inner Mongolia
- Termini: Jining South; Baotou
- Stations: 15

Service
- Type: Higher-speed rail
- System: China Railway High-speed
- Operator(s): CR Hohhot

History
- Opened: 3 December 2012

Technical
- Line length: 308 km (191 mi)
- Number of tracks: 2 (Double-track)
- Track gauge: 1,435 mm (4 ft 8 1/2 in) standard gauge
- Minimum radius: generally 4,500 m (2.8 mi) or 3,500 m (2.2 mi) on difficult sections
- Electrification: 25 kV 50 Hz AC (Overhead line)
- Operating speed: 200 kilometres per hour (120 mph)
- Signalling: ABS
- Maximum incline: 0.6% uphill, 0.9% downhill

The Jining–Baotou railway (also referred to in Chinese as the Jibao second double-track line, or the Jibao line for short) is a railway from Ulanqab City to Baotou City in Inner Mongolia Autonomous Region. Its route is basically parallel to the Jining to Baotou section of the Beijing–Baotou railway and it is 308 km (191 mi) long. Construction started in April 2009 and it was officially opened to traffic on 3 December 2012. The entire line is under the jurisdiction and operation of the Hohhot Railway Bureau. Since the date of opening to traffic, most passenger trains on the original Jining–Baotou section of the Beijing-Baotou Railway have operated via the Jibao line. EMU trains have operated between Baotou, Hohhot and Jining since 8 January 2015.

The Jining–Baotou line from Guyingpan to Taigemu has since been merged with the Tangshan–Baotou railway and the Zhangjiakou–Jining railway to form the Tangshan–Baotou railway (Tangbao), while the section from Taigemu to Baotou is now considered to form part of the Beijing–Baotou Passenger Dedicated Line, although this section is not a true high-speed line. The line forms part of the Beijing–Lanzhou corridor of China's "Eight Vertical and Eight Horizontal" network.
