= Bikeqi railway station =

Railway station in Inner Mongolia, China

Coordinates: 40.7233°N 111.2868°E

Bikeqi railway station 毕克齐站

General information
- Location: Inner Mongolia, Hohhot, Tumed Left Banner, Bikeqi Village
- Owner: China Railway Hohhot Group
- Line: Tangshan–Baotou railway

Other information
- Station code: 12602
- Classification: Fourth class station
Location

Bikeqi railway station is a station of Tangshan–Baotou railway in Tumed Left Banner, Hohhot, Inner Mongolia.

== Station information ==
Bikeqi Station, established in 1923, is a Class Four station on the Tangshan-Baotou railway of the China Railway Hohhot Group.

Located at a critical junction, Bikeqi Station handles an average of over 200 train arrivals and departures daily. Additionally, it is responsible for military transport services, placing significant responsibilities on its 13 staff members.

== See also ==
- List of stations on Jingbao railway
