= China Railways QJ =

Class of Chinese steam locomotives

QJ 前进
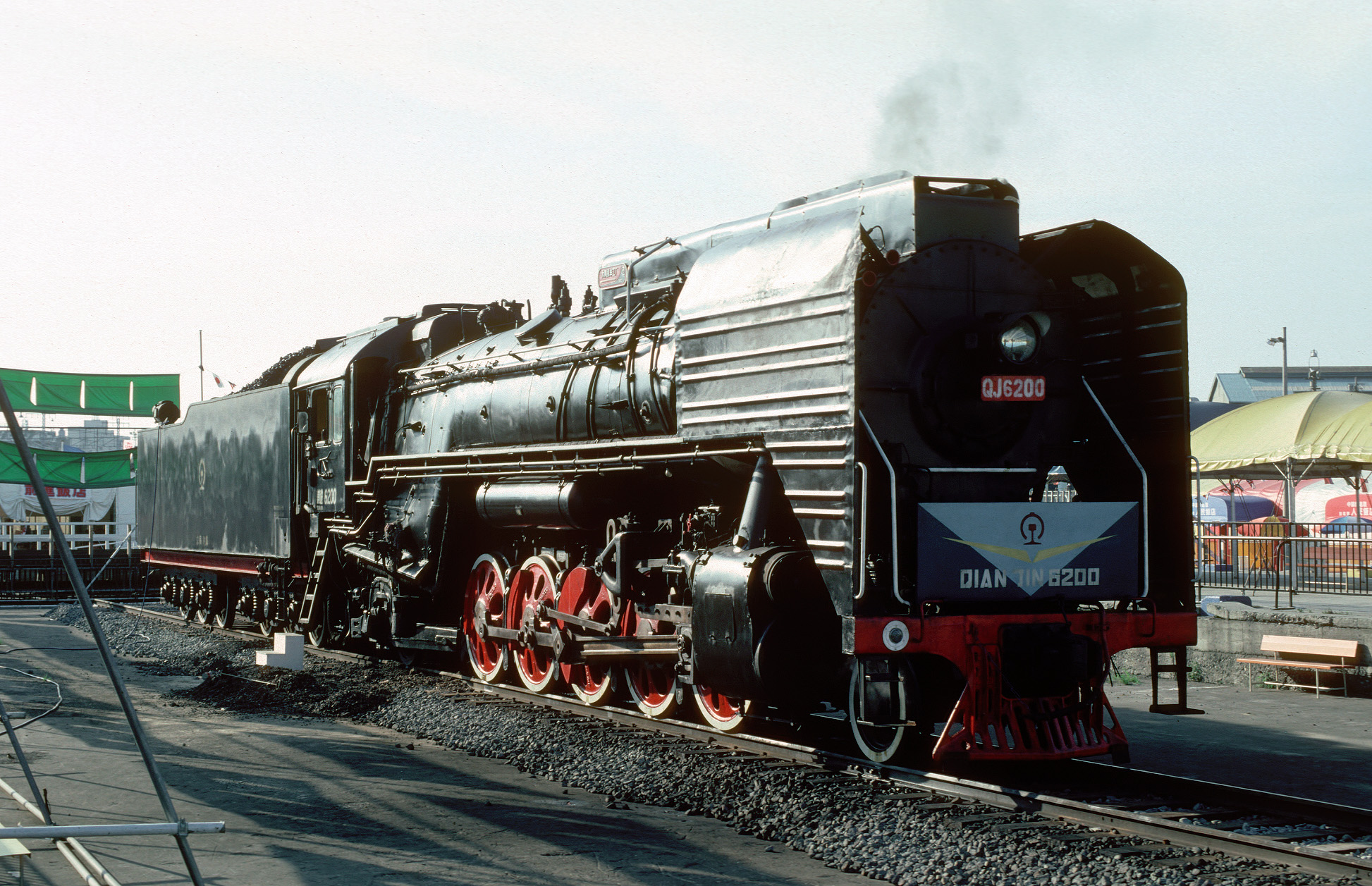
- QJ-6200 on display at the China Railways exposition in Sakuragicho, Yokohama, Japan, August 1982
Type and origin
- Power type: Steam
- Builder: Prototypes; Dalian: HP 0001–0005; Tangshan: HP 1001–1008; Shenyang: HP 1501–1506; Mudanjiang: HP 2001–2003; Changchun: HP 3001–3002; Datong: HP 3501–3508; Main production; Datong: QJ 101–3602 and QJ 6001–7207
- Model: HP (1956–1966); FD (1966–1971); QJ (1971–1988)
- Build date: 1956–1961, 1964–1988
- Total produced: 4,717
Specifications
- Configuration
  - Whyte: 2-10-2
  - UIC: 1′E1′
- Gauge: 4 ft 8 1/2 in (1,435 mm) standard gauge
- Leading dia.: 920 mm (36.22 in)
- Driver dia.: 1,500 mm (59.06 in)
- Trailing dia.: 1,120 mm (44.09 in)
- Tender wheels: 1,000 mm (39.37 in)
- Minimum curve: 145 m (5,700 in; 476 ft)
- Wheelbase: 6,400 mm (250 in; 21.0 ft)
- Length: 16,250 mm (640 in; 53.31 ft) (prototypes); 16,140 mm (635 in; 52.95 ft) (main production)
- Width: 3,332 mm (131.2 in; 10.932 ft) (prototypes); 3,375 mm (132.9 in; 11.073 ft) (main production)
- Height: 4,790 mm (189 in; 15.72 ft)
- Loco weight: 133.0 t (130.9 long tons; 146.6 short tons) (prototypes); 133.8 t (131.7 long tons; 147.5 short tons) (main production); 135.1 t (133.0 long tons; 148.9 short tons) (late production)
- Tender weight: 4-axle: 82 t (81 long tons; 90 short tons) (prototypes); 83.5–84 t (82.2–82.7 long tons; 92.0–92.6 short tons) (main production); 6-axle: 118.5 t (116.6 long tons; 130.6 short tons) (prototypes); 114.5–119.7 t (112.7–117.8 long tons; 126.2–131.9 short tons) (main production)
- Fuel type: Coal
- Fuel capacity: 4-axle: 15 t (15 long tons; 17 short tons) (prototypes); 14.5 t (14.3 long tons; 16.0 short tons) (main production); 6-axle: 20 t (20 long tons; 22 short tons) (prototypes); 21.5 t (21.2 long tons; 23.7 short tons) (main production)
- Water cap.: 4-axle: 35 m^{3} (9,200 US gal) (prototypes); 40 m^{3} (11,000 US gal) (main production); 6-axle: 46 m^{3} (12,000 US gal) (prototypes); 50 m^{3} (13,000 US gal) (main production)
- Firebox
  - Grate area: 6.80 m^{2} (73.2 sq ft)
- Boiler
  - Diameter: 2,010 mm (79 in; 6.59 ft) (prototypes); 2,100 mm (83 in; 6.9 ft) (main production)
- Boiler pressure: 1,471 kPa (213.4 psi)
- Cylinders: Two, outside
- Cylinder size: 650 mm × 800 mm (25.59 in × 31.50 in); bore; × stroke
- Valve gear: Walschaerts
- Valve type: Piston valves
- Loco brake: Air
- Train brakes: Air
- Couplers: Knuckle
Performance figures
- Maximum speed: 80 km/h (50 mph)
- Power output: 2,222 kW (2,980 hp) (official), 2,670 kW (3,580 hp) (measured at 66 km/h or 41 mph)
- Tractive effort: 33,290 kgf (73,400 lbf; 326.5 kN); 28,734 kgf (63,350 lbf; 281.78 kN) (85% pressure)
Career
- Operators: China Railway; Iowa Interstate Railroad
- Number in class: 4,717
- Numbers: 0001–0005, 1001–1008, 1501–1506, 2001–2003, 3001–3002, 3501–3508, 101–3602, 6001–7207
- Delivered: 1956
- First run: 1956
- Last run: 2010
- Retired: 1988–2010
- Preserved: 25
- Disposition: 25 preserved (21 in China, 3 in USA, 1 in Germany), remainder scrapped

The China Railways QJ (Chinese: 前进; pinyin: Qián Jìn; lit. 'To go forward" or "to advance') is a class of 2-10-2 type steam locomotives used primarily for heavy freight trains. They were introduced in 1956 by the Dalian Locomotive Works, and all of the production locomotives were built by the Datong Locomotive Works. The prototypes and early production of the class were designated HP (Chinese: 和平; pinyin: Hé Píng; lit. 'peace'), being redesignated as FD (Chinese: 反帝; pinyin: Fǎn Dì; lit. 'Anti-Imperialism') class during the Cultural Revolution, before becoming the QJ class in 1971.

The class became the primary mainline freight locomotive on the Chinese rail network by the 1980s. Manufactured until 1988, a total of 4,717 were produced. Following the end of steam on the national Chinese railway network, many QJ locomotives were used on industrial lines, as well as on the Jitong railway, and the latter also phased out their QJs in 2005. Several members of the class have been preserved in several countries.

== History and design ==
=== Development and prototypes ===
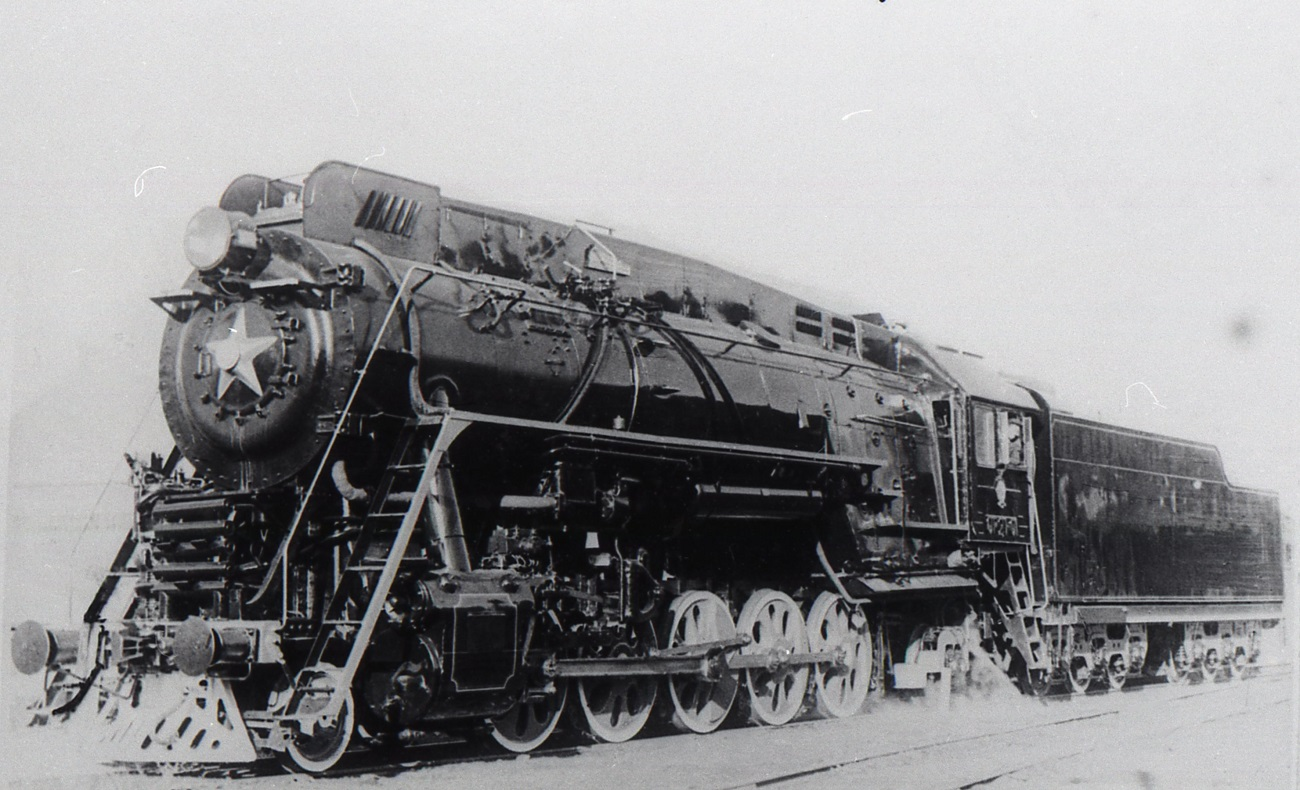
Soviet class OR21-1, 1953. An intended successor to the class OR18, the OR21 served as a basis for the Chinese QJ design

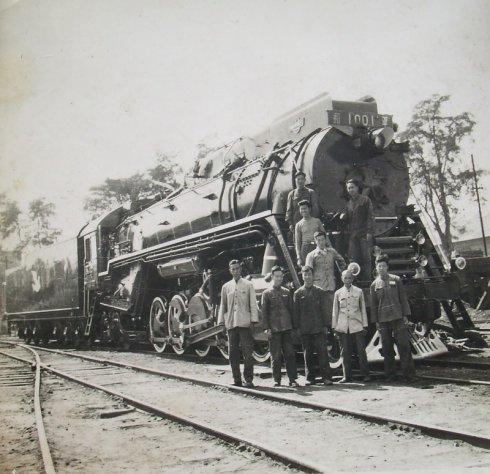
Prototype locomotive HP-1001 in Tangshan, 1958

As early as 1954, the Dalian Locomotive Works began studying 2-10-2 locomotive designs to assist China Railways' increasing freight traffic. At the time, the People's Republic of China was allied with the Soviet Union, and as part of the latter's economic aid for the former, Dalian's engineering process was assisted by Soviet experts with Soviet technology. Dalian's new 2-10-2 design was consequently based upon the Soviet class OR21, a more powerful variant of the class OR18.

The first prototype 2-10-2, HP-0001, was completed by Dalian on 18 September 1956, and it was designated an HP (Chinese: 和平; pinyin: Hé Píng; lit. 'peace'). In accordance with the design, the HP prototype was identical to the OR21s, as it came with all-boxpok driving wheels (diameter of 1,500 millimetres (59 in), flangeless center driving wheels, an all-welded boiler (diameter of 2,010 millimetres (79 in), and an operating boiler pressure of 1,471 kilopascals (213.4 psi), and it could generate a tractive force of 33,290 kilograms-force (73,400 lbf). One difference from the OR designs was that the HP also included a delta trailing truck akin to those on the class FD, another Soviet 2-10-2 series.

From 1956 to 1961, 41 additional prototype HPs were also built for testing: four more (HP-0002–HP-0005) by Dalian; eight (HP-1001–HP-1008) by the Tangshan Locomotive and Rolling Stock Works; six (HP-1501–HP-1506) by the Shenyang Locomotive Factory; three (HP-2001–HP-2003) by the Mudanjiang Locomotive Factory; two (HP-3001–HP-3002) by the Changchun Locomotive Factory; and eighteen (HP-3501–HP-3518) by the Datong Locomotive Works. The latter prototypes were the very first steam locomotives to be built by Datong.

While the prototypes were being developed and tested, China Railways acquired 1,000 secondhand class FDs from the Soviet Railways in 1958—with another 50 in 1961—as stopgap measures for their increasing freight traffic, until production on the HPs were able to begin.

=== Production ===
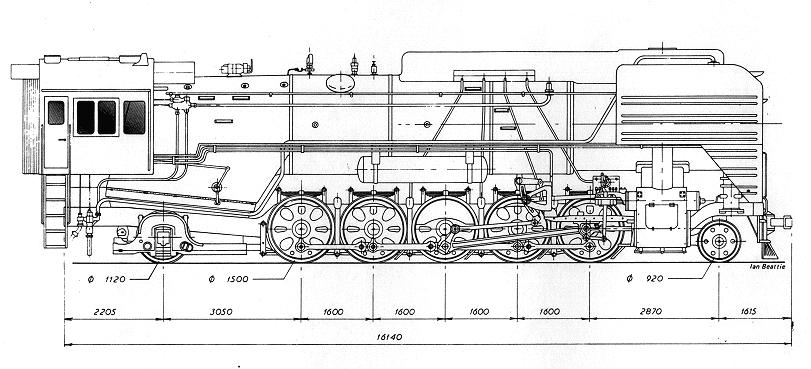
Works diagram of the China Railways QJ locomotive

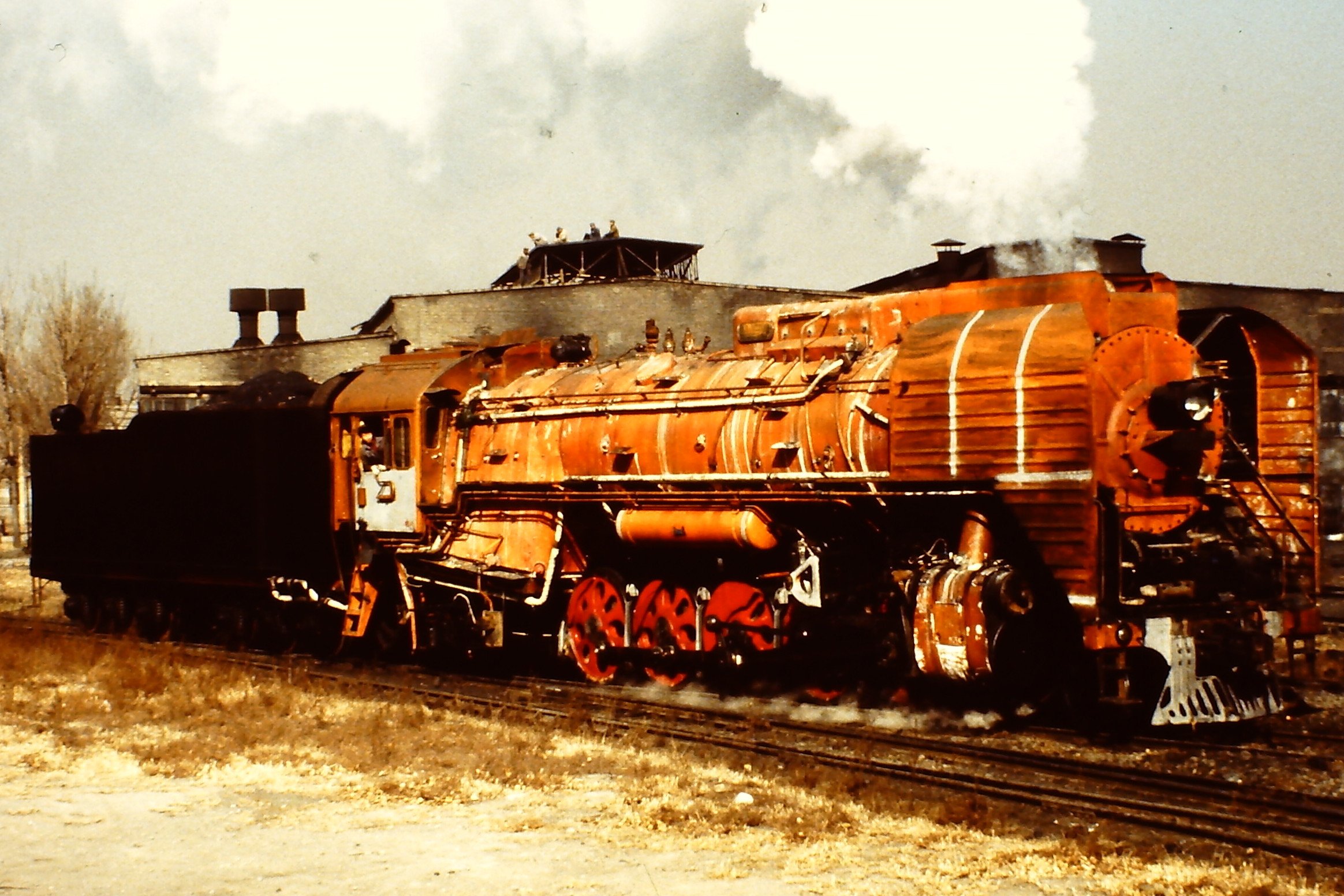
Factory test drive in Datong, 3 November 1984

After the final prototypes were completed, multiple modifications were made to the HP's boiler design. The boiler barrel diameter was enlarged to 2,100 millimetres (83 in); the smokebox and blast pipe orifice were enlarged to improve drafting; a combustion chamber, which the prototypes lacked, was installed in the firebox to improve combustion; the number of tubes was increased, while the tube length was decreased from the firebox tube plate being extended past the grate; and the maximum cutoff was increased to 72%.

The first locomotive with the design modifications, HP-101, was completed by Datong on 28 September 1964. After further test runs, Datong officially began production on the rest of the HPs, beginning with HP-102 in April 1965. In September 1966, amidst the Cultural Revolution, the HPs were re-designated as the FD class (反帝 Fandi meaning 'anti-imperialism'), and then in 1971, the class was re-designated again as the QJ class (Qian Jin, meaning 'march forward' or 'progress').

The 500th locomotive of the class was built in 1968, the 1,000th in 1970, the 2,000th in 1974 and the 3,000th in 1979, with production rates varying from 150 to over 300 per year between 1966 and 1985. Production ended in 1988 with 4,717 QJs produced.

The prototypes used eight wheel tenders, while later production models used twelve wheel tenders. The QJs were equipped with mechanical stokers, feedwater heaters, electric lights, and air horns. Various modifications were used on some engines, including an ejector similar to the giesl type and smoke deflectors. One unit was used as a test bed for a 'Gas Producer Combustion System' (GPCS) (Note: GPCS is a technology which uses the carbon in coal and engine steam as source of synthesis gas for more efficient and cleaner combustion.) in the 1980s.

=== Services ===
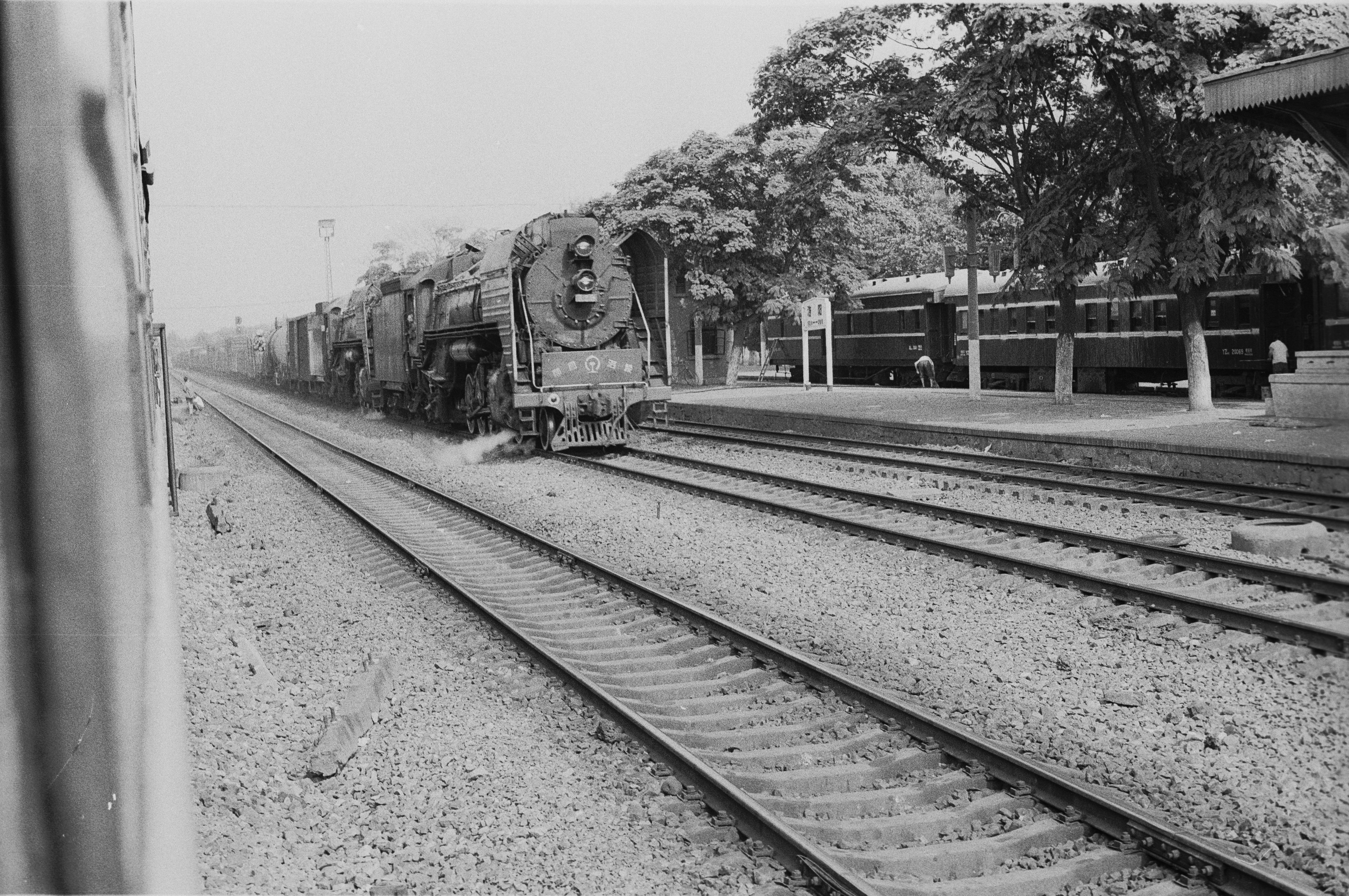
Two QJ locomotives passing the Luoyang Railway Station with a freight train, 7 August 1977

The class became the primary freight locomotive on both the primary and secondary lines of the Chinese railway network by the 1980s, having displaced both JF and FD classes. From the late 1980s and through the 1990s the class were retired and replaced by diesel locomotives. Steam traction officially ended on the Chinese national rail network in 2002, but a few units remained in use up to 2003 on minor lines.

The locomotives were also used on large passenger trains, when their high tractive power was advantageous.

After withdrawal from the Chinese national network many units were acquired by industrial railways as well as the regional Jitong Railway in Inner Mongolia which operated ~100 units. On 8 December 2005 the Jitong Railway had also replaced the QJ locomotives with diesel engines. Some remained in use on industrial lines in China in 2010.

== Preservation ==
=== QJ Class in the United States ===
Two engines withdrawn from use in China, numbers 6988 and 7081 (both former Jitong Railway), were originally acquired by the Iowa Interstate Railroad in 2006 and later donated to Central States Steam Preservation Association. A third, number 7040 (re-numbered to 2008), was acquired by the Lexington, Kentucky-based RJ Corman in 2008, and operated until 2013, when it was placed on display in a specially built glass display building in Lexington. In 2020, Corman donated the engine to the Kentucky Steam Heritage Corporation. Both the IAIS QJs are out of service as of 2022 for mandated FRA 1472-day inspections with repairs for overhaul to restored.

Iowa Interstate 7081 retains its original Chinese appearance with the exception of the Jitong lettering and logo being replaced with the Iowa Interstate's, and the mandatory changes required by U.S. law such as hand rails and a bell. IAIS 6988 was "Americanized" in time for operation at Train Festival 2011 in Rock Island, Illinois. The diesel-style bell originally installed when it arrived in Iowa was replaced with a steam engine type bell, the Chinese headlights were replaced with an American style light with a cast number plate under it, and an American steam whistle was installed. The steel sheet on the front was removed and all red paint was painted over in black, with white trim on the running boards, wheel rims, etc. The RJ Corman locomotive has been heavily modified. Most notably the smoke deflectors have been removed along with new paint and skirts along the running boards.

=== Museums ===
Several of the class are on static display around China:

- QJ-0001 and QJ-0004, QJ-101 are displayed at the China Railway Museum.
- QJ-1316 is on display at the China Industrial Museum.
- QJ-1450 is on display at the Tangshan Locomotive Depot, Beijing Railway Bureau.
- QJ-1997 and QJ-8001 are displayed at the Datong Railway Museum.
- QJ-2655 is on display at the Technik Museum Speyer in Germany.
- QJ-6020 is on display at the Jining Locomotive Depot, Hohhot Railway Bureau.
- QJ-6368 and QJ-6540 are displayed at the Shenyang Railway Museum.
- QJ-6911 is on display at the Daban Locomotive Depot, Jitong Railway.

== Gallery ==
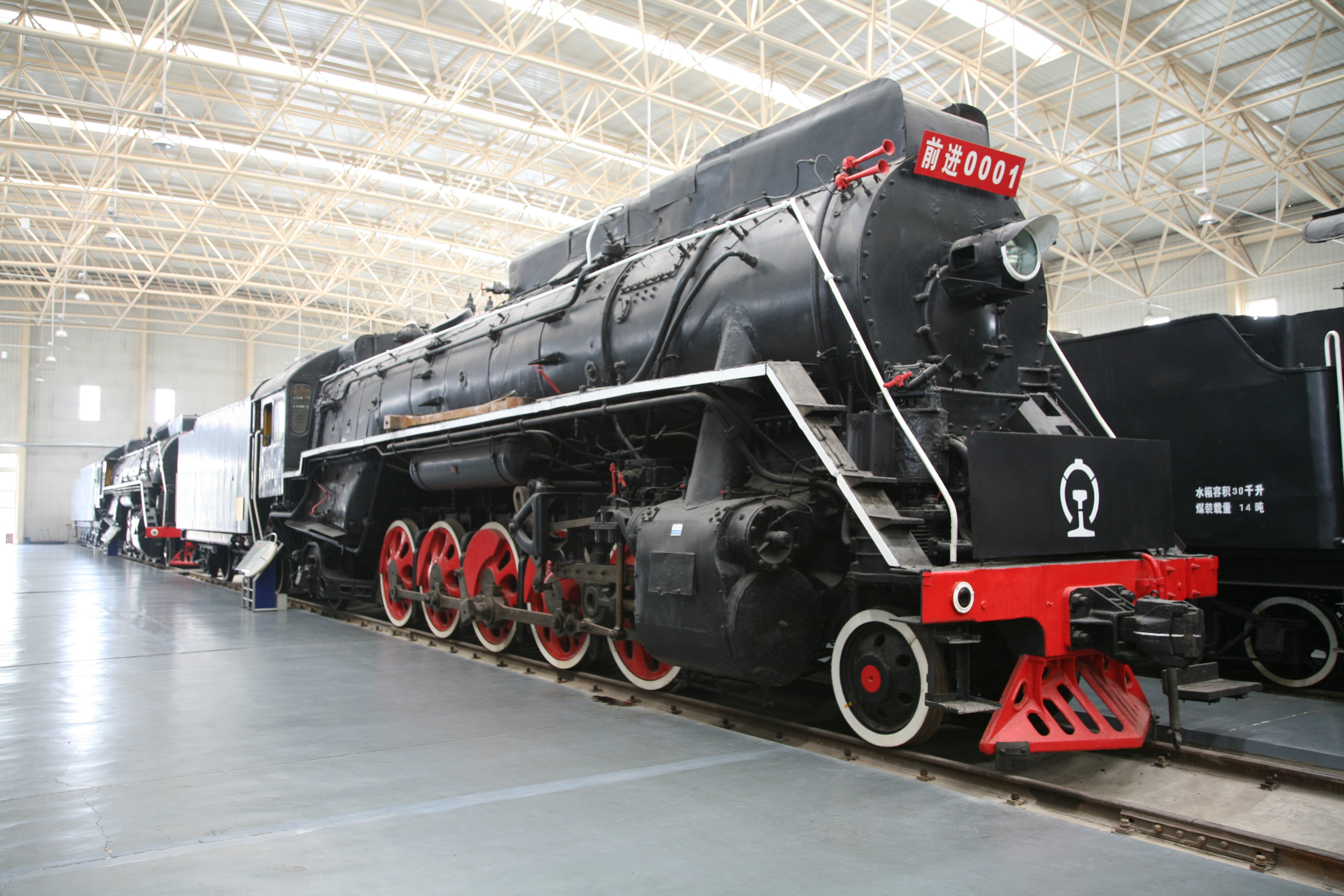
QJ-0001 on display at the China Railway Museum

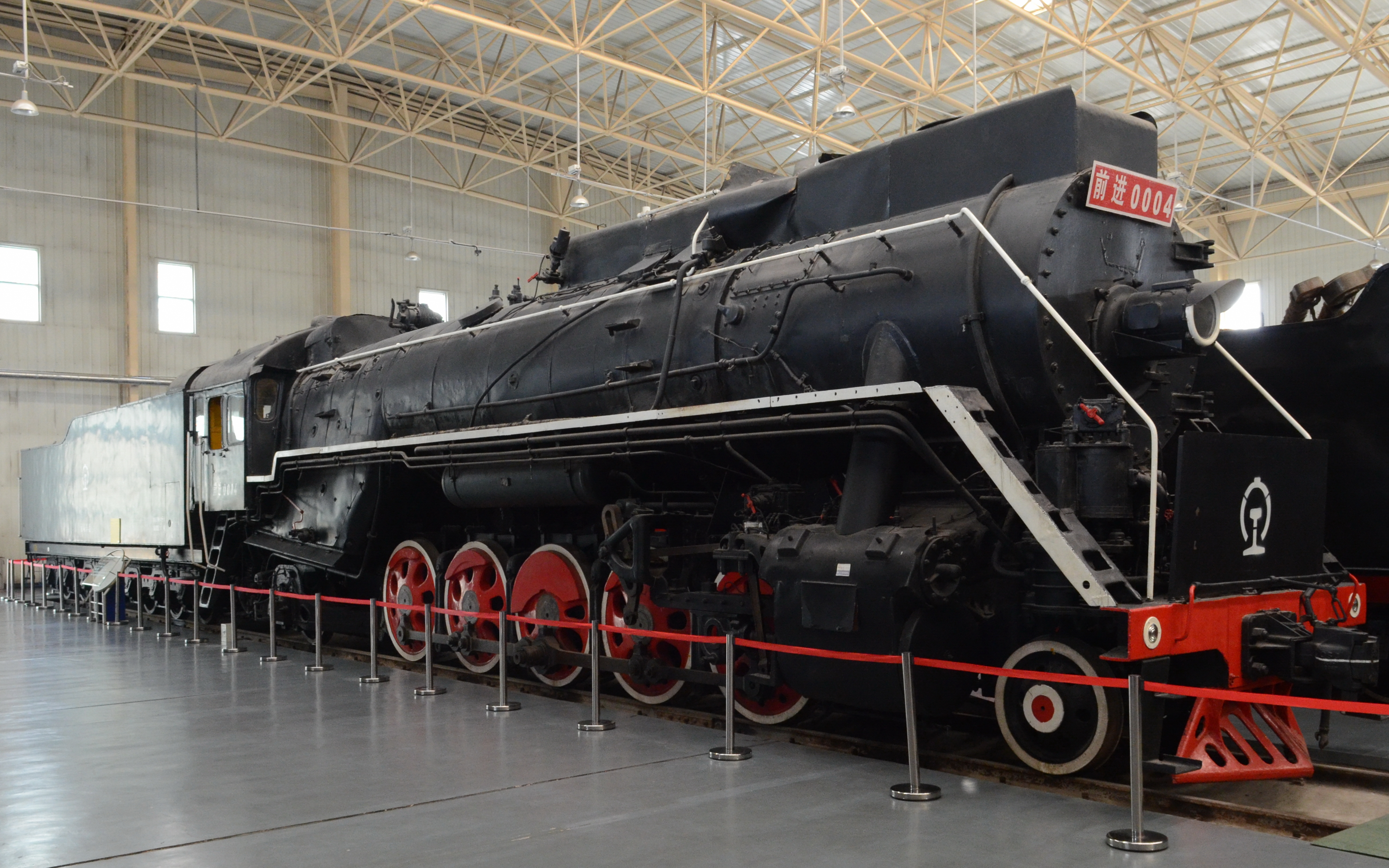
QJ-0004 on display at the China Railway Museum

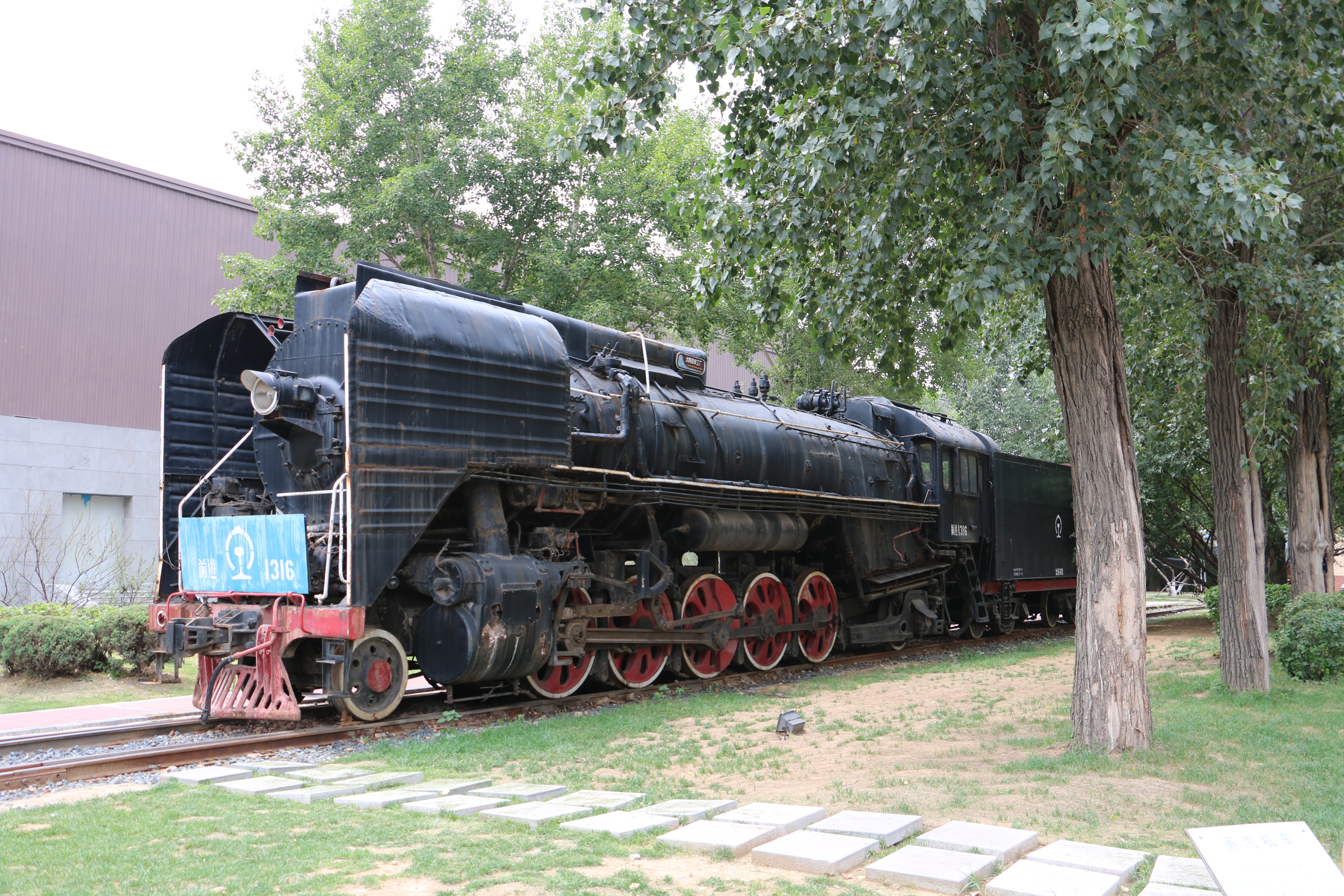
QJ-1316 on display at the China Industrial Museum

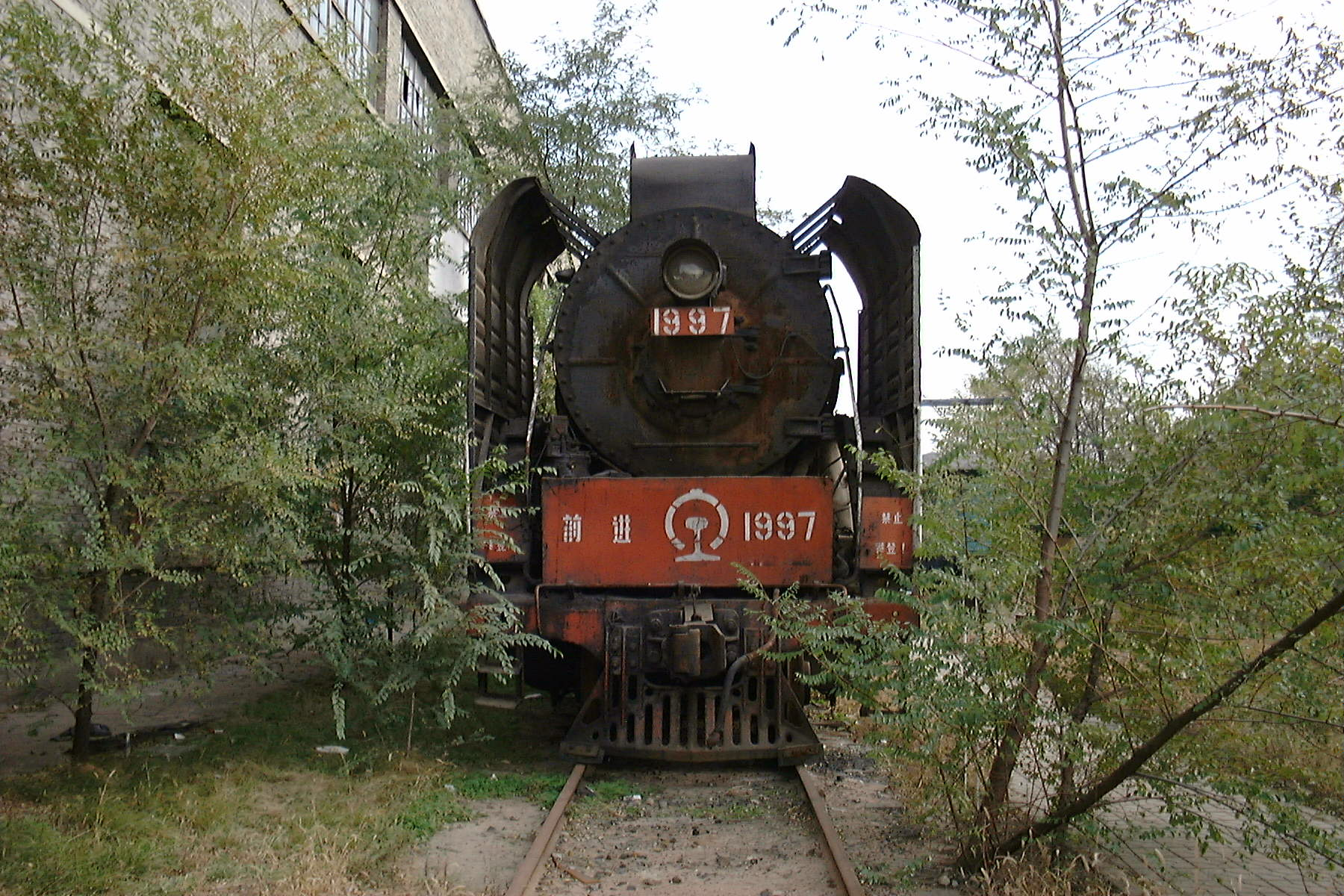
QJ-1997 on display at the Datong Railway Museum

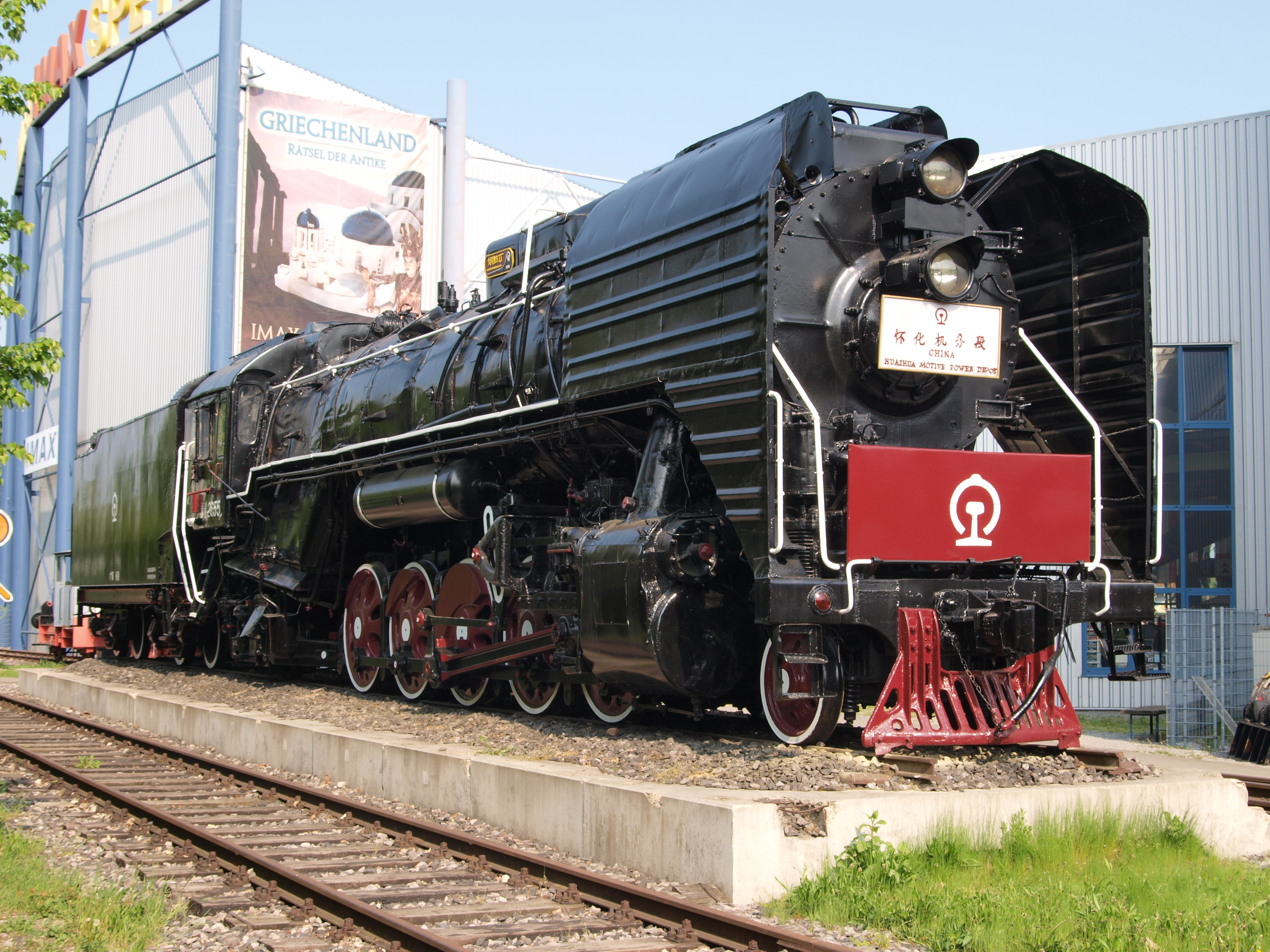
QJ-2655 on display at the Technik Museum Speyer

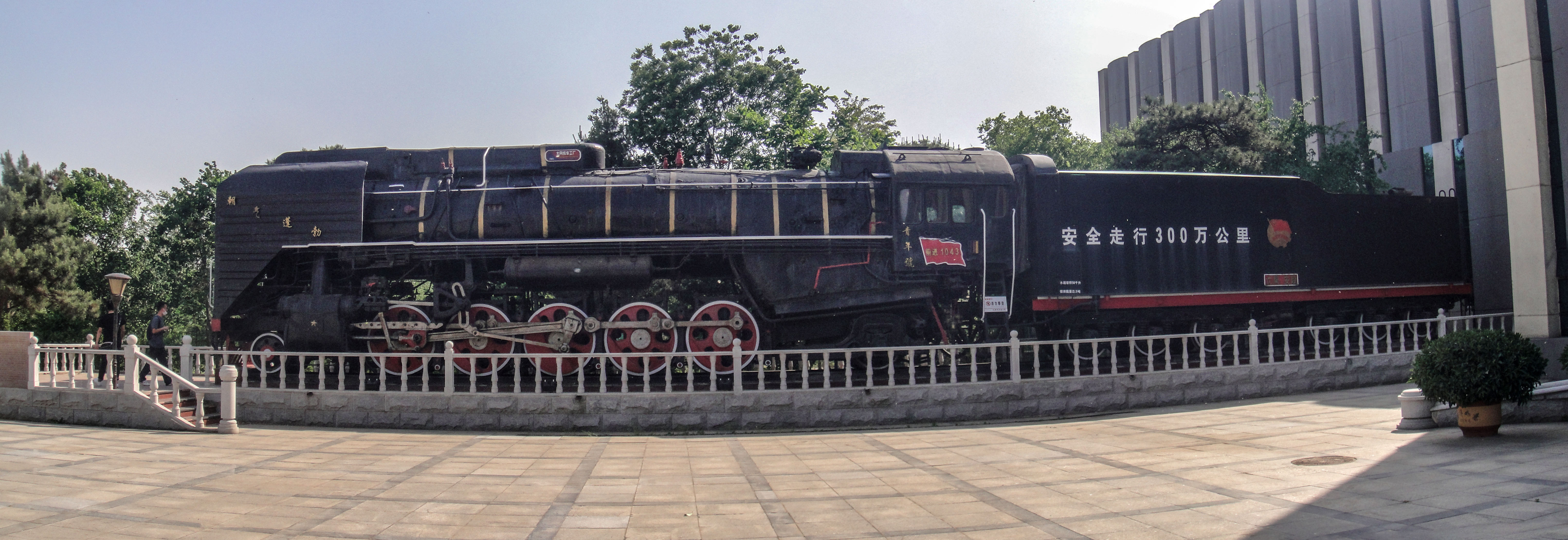
QJ-6540 (1043) on display at the Tangshan Locomotive Depot

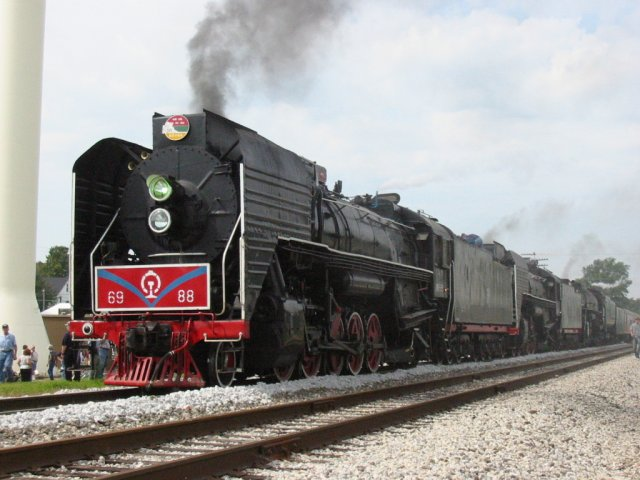
QJ-6988 and QJ-7081 leading a tripleheader excursion train with Milwaukee Road 261 in the United States

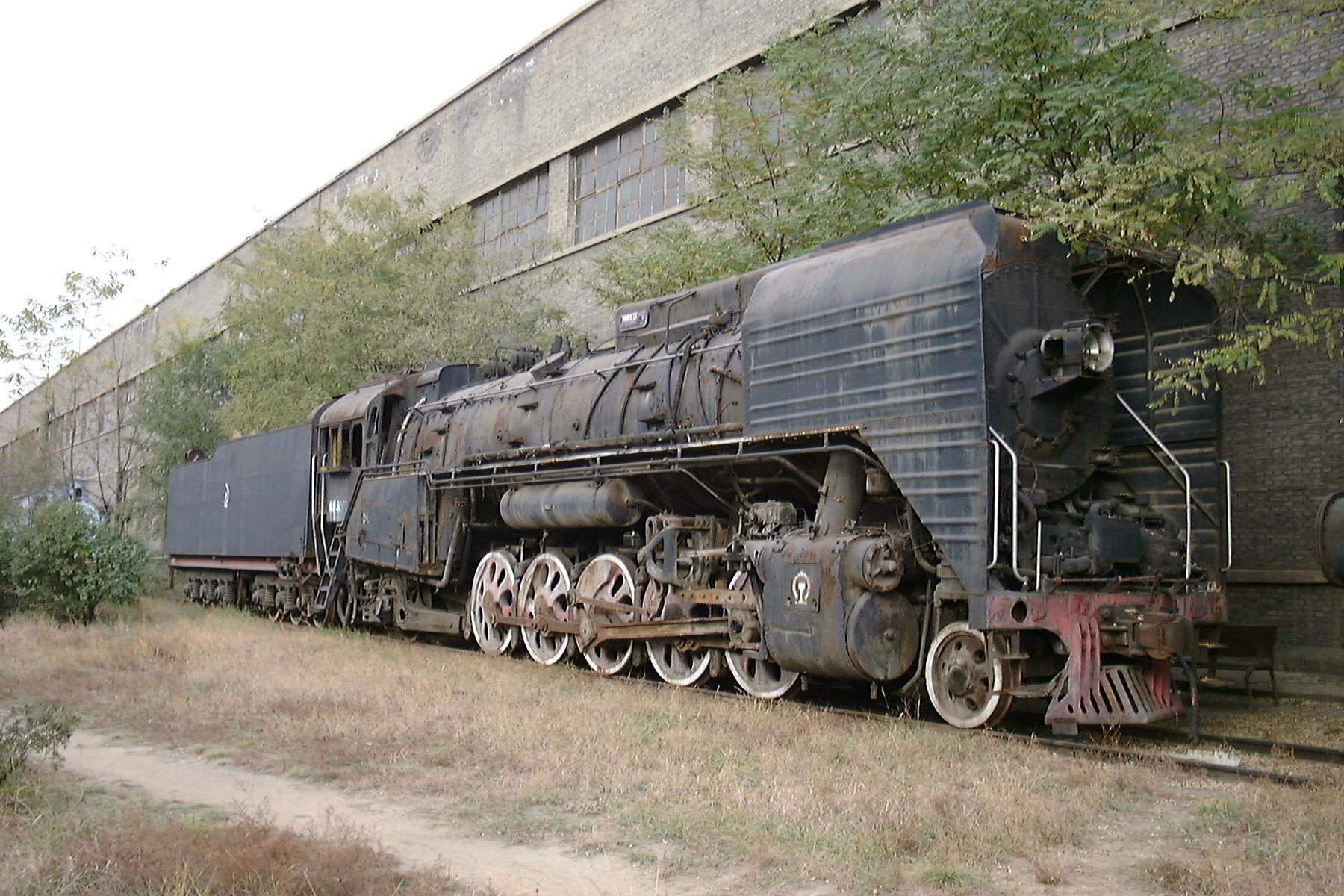
QJ-8001 on display at the Datong Railway Museum

== Bibliography ==
- Gibbons, Robin (2017). Locomotives of China - The QJ Class. Tynedale Publishing. ISBN 978-0993419225.
