= Jining railway station (Inner Mongolia) =

Railway station in Ulanqab, Inner Mongolia

Coordinates: 41.0423°N 113.1044°E

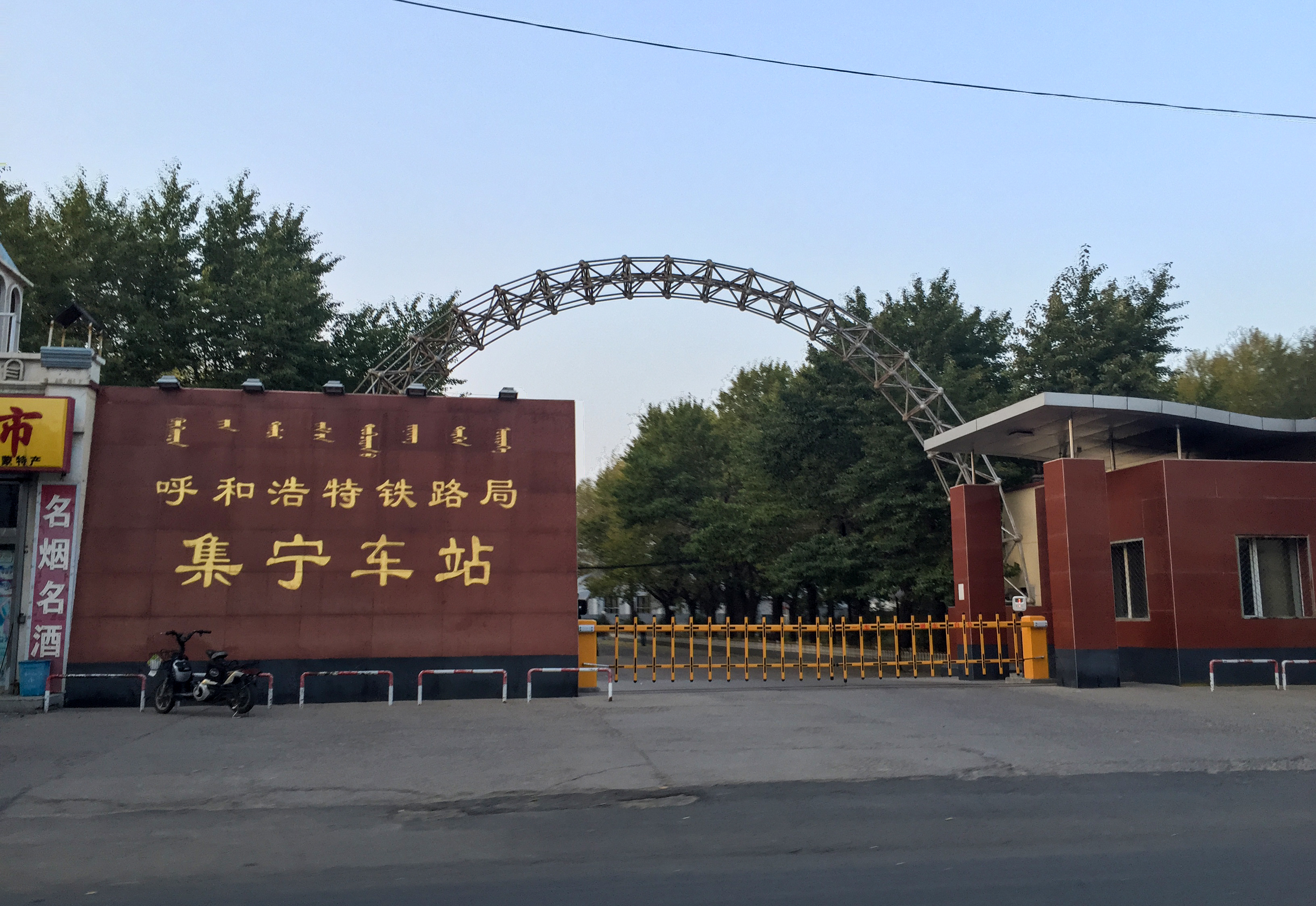
The station in 2017

Jining railway station (Chinese: 集宁站) is a third-class railway station in Jining District, Ulanqab, Inner Mongolia. It opened in 1953. The station only handles freight, there are no passenger services.

== See also ==
- Jining South railway station
- Ulanqab railway station
