= Jining–Tongliao railway =

Railway line in Inner Mongolia, China

Overview
- Status: Operational
- Termini: Jining South; Tongliao East

Service
- Type: Heavy rail

History
- Opened: 1995

Technical
- Line length: 923 km (574 mi)
- Track gauge: 1,435 mm (4 ft 8 1/2 in) standard gauge
- Electrification: 50 Hz 25 kV (AC)

The Jitong-Tongliao railway (simplified Chinese: 集通铁路; traditional Chinese: 集通鐵路; pinyin: Jítōng Tiělù), abbreviated as the Jitong railway, is a 945-kilometre (587 mi) railway in Inner Mongolia, China, that opened in 1995. Its starting point is at Jining and ends at Tongliao. The Jitong Railway is a joint venture between China Railway and the government of Inner Mongolia. Since Inner Mongolia was one of the poorer provinces of China in the early 1990s, the line was built with an eye towards reducing startup costs, with the intention of upgrading at a future date as funds became available. The tracks were built to a high engineering standard, featuring heavy rail, concrete crossties, and extensive use of tunnels and viaducts to reduce grades. In contrast, lower-cost anachronistic technologies were intentionally selected for cases where it was possible to upgrade incrementally: semaphore signaling, staffed crossing gates, and steam engines.

== World's last mainline steam train service ==
Due to low labor costs and plentiful coal, China was one of the last countries to retire steam locomotives on mainline services. As dieselisation and electrification progressed in the early 1990s, China Railways found itself with a large stock of surplus steam locomotives, some built as recently as the late 1980s. The government of Inner Mongolia was thus able to acquire steam engines at a low cost for use on the Jitong railway. The line's proximity to coal mines also allowed fuel to be procured locally, resulting in reduced operating costs.

The Jitong railway was the last mainline railway in the world to use steam locomotives. All of these locomotives were the large 2-10-2 QJ type engines and often trains had 2 locomotives on their head end. On December 8, 2005, the world's last regular mainline steam train finished its journey, marking the end of the steam era. The steam locomotives were replaced by the DF4 diesel locomotives.

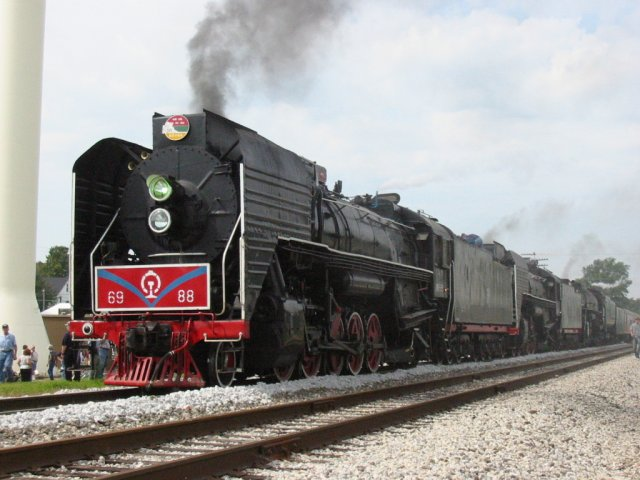
The two QJ locomotives with Milwaukee Road 261 behind them on an excursion through Illinois, here passing Atkinson on September 16, 2006.

Most of the QJs were scrapped, but a handful are on display at the depot in Daban. Three have been exported to the United States of America. 6988 and 7081 were sold to the Iowa Interstate Railroad in 2006, and have operated on many excursions since. 7040 was sold to the RJ Corman company in Kentucky in 2008. Renumbered 2008, it ran special trips for five years before being put into storage in 2013. It was sold to the Kentucky steam Heritage Corp. in March 2020, and will eventually be evaluated for an overhaul.

== Electrification ==
Electrification of the railway began in April 2020. The project was initially expected to take four years but was temporarily delayed by the Covid pandemic to be completed by 2026. It was nonetheless fully electrified by November 2024.

== See also ==
- Rail transport in the People's Republic of China
- Rail transport in Inner Mongolia
- List of railways in China
