= Guyingpan railway station =

Railway station in Jining, China

Coordinates: 40.9451°N 113.1053°E

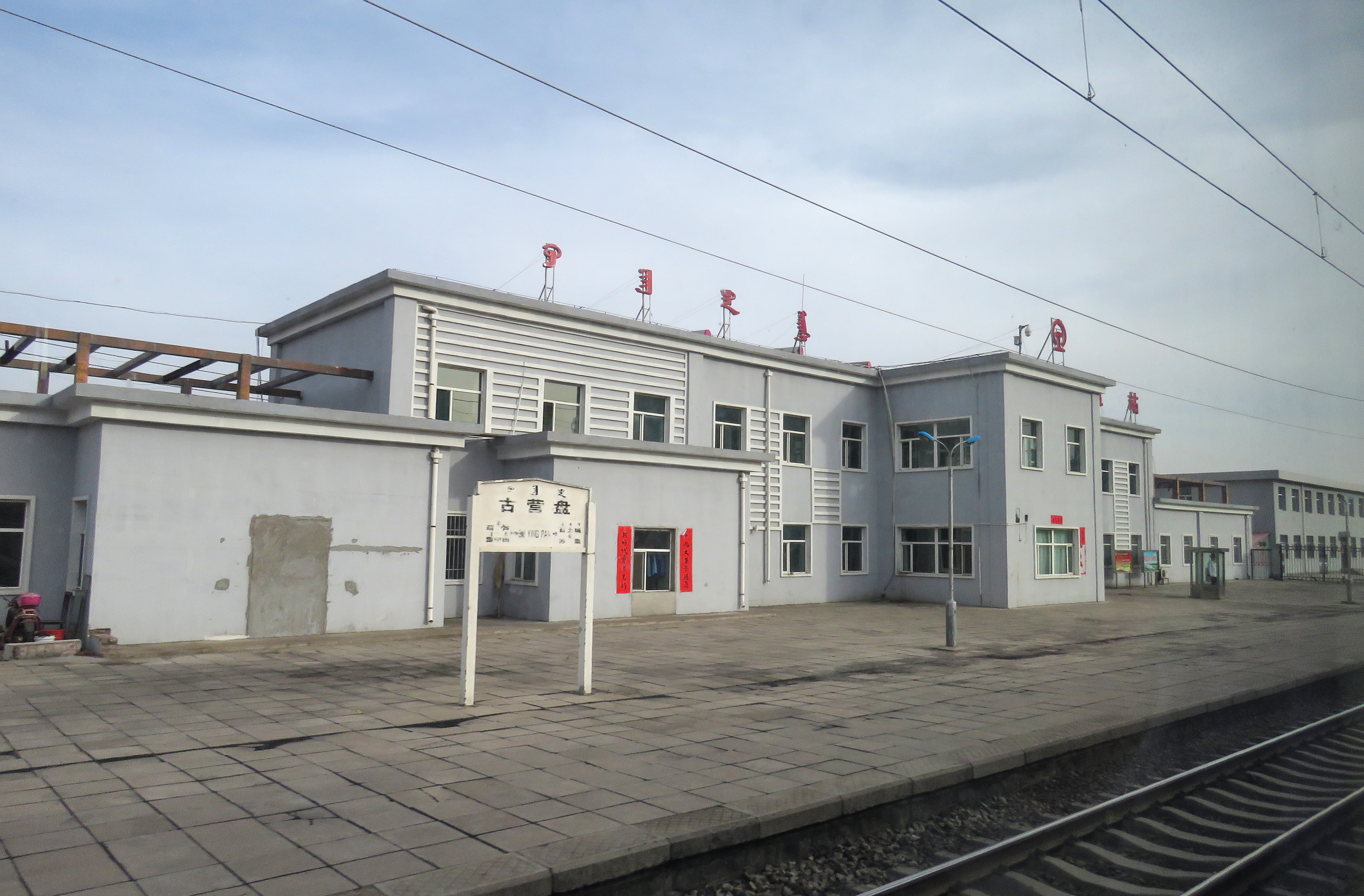
Guyingpan Railway Station

Guyingpan station (古营盘站) is a railway station on the Beijing–Baotou railway near Jining, Inner Mongolia, China.

== See also ==
- List of stations on Jingbao railway
