= Jining South railway station =

Railway station in Ulanqab, China

Jining South 集宁南
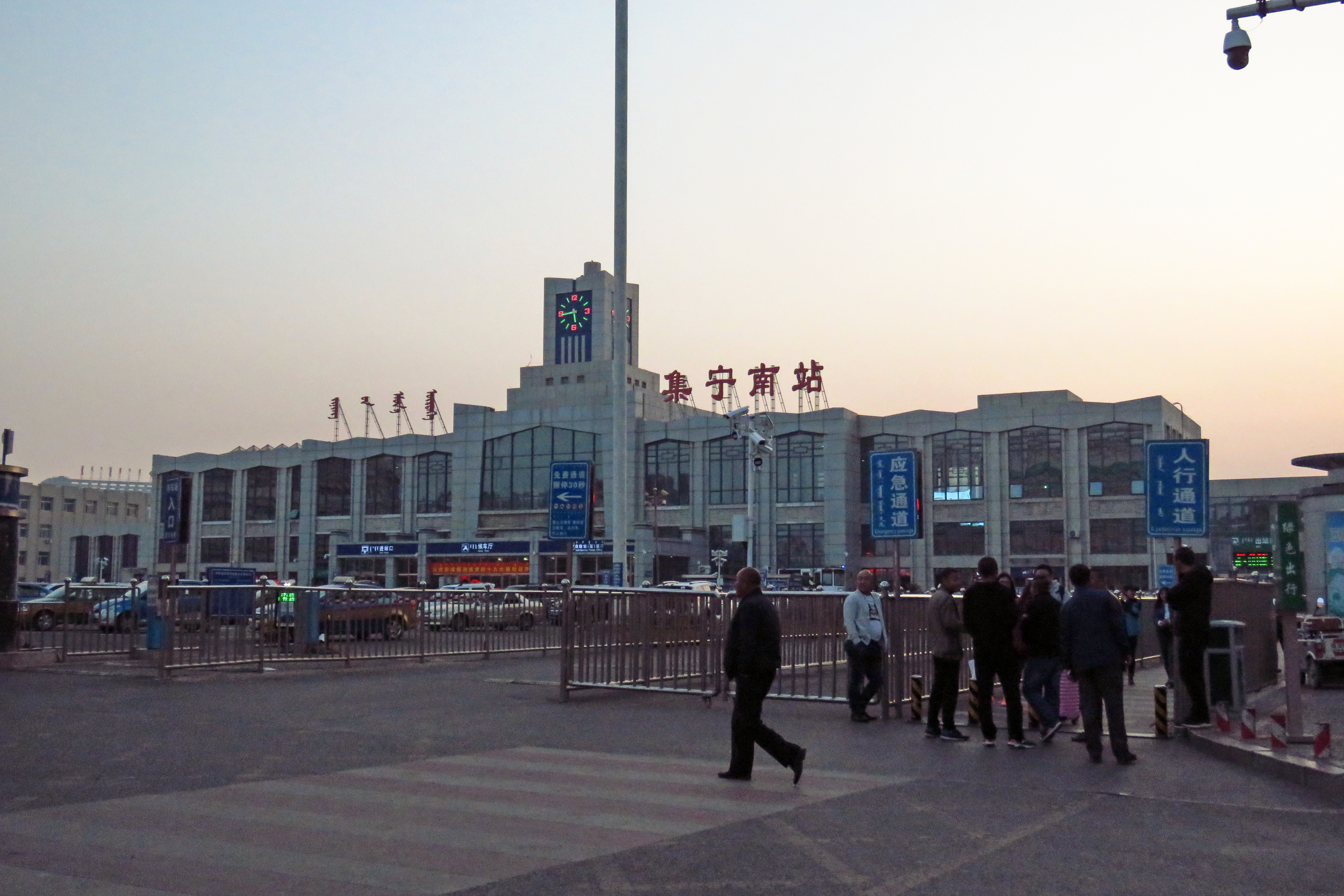

General information
- Location: Jining District, Ulanqab, Inner Mongolia; China
- Coordinates: 41°1′47″N 113°5′29″E
- Operated by: CR Hohhot
- Lines: Jingbao Railway, Ji'er Railway (集二铁路), Jitong railway, Zhangji Railway (张集铁路)
- Platforms: 2

History
- Opened: 1921
- Previous names: Pingdiquan
Location

Jining South railway station (simplified Chinese: 集宁南站; traditional Chinese: 集寧南站; pinyin: Jíníng-nán Zhàn) is a railway station of Jingbao railway, Ji'er railway and Jitong railway. The station is located in Jining, Ulanqab, Inner Mongolia, China.

== History ==
The station opened in 1921.

== See also ==
- Jining railway station (Inner Mongolia)
- Ulanqab railway station
