= Salaqi =

Salaqi 萨拉齐镇 • ᠰᠡᠷᠡᠴᠢ
- Town
- Location in Inner Mongolia
- Coordinates: 40°34′N 110°31′E
- Country: People's Republic of China
- Region: Inner Mongolia
- Prefecture-level city: Baotou
- Banner: Tumed Right Banner
- Elevation: 1,007 m (3,304 ft)
- Time zone: UTC+8 (China Standard)

Salaqi (Mongolian: ᠰᠡᠷᠡᠴᠢ, simplified Chinese: 萨拉齐; traditional Chinese: 薩拉齊; pinyin: Sālāqí) is the central town of Tumed Right Banner. It is under the administration of Baotou City, Inner Mongolia, People's Republic of China.

Historically, Salaqi was a Ting^{(zh)} (薩拉齊廳) and then a county (薩拉齊縣), ruling Baotou as a town within. After several alterations in mid-20th century, Tumed Right Banner was established and Salaqi became a town; but the name Salaqi is still widely used by people in Hetao area to refer to the accent, the disposition and other features of Salaqi locals.

Salaqi East is also a railway station on the Beijing–Baotou railway.
