= Salaqi East railway station =

Railway station in Salaqi, China

Coordinates: 40.5646°N 110.5316°E

Salaqi East 萨拉齐站
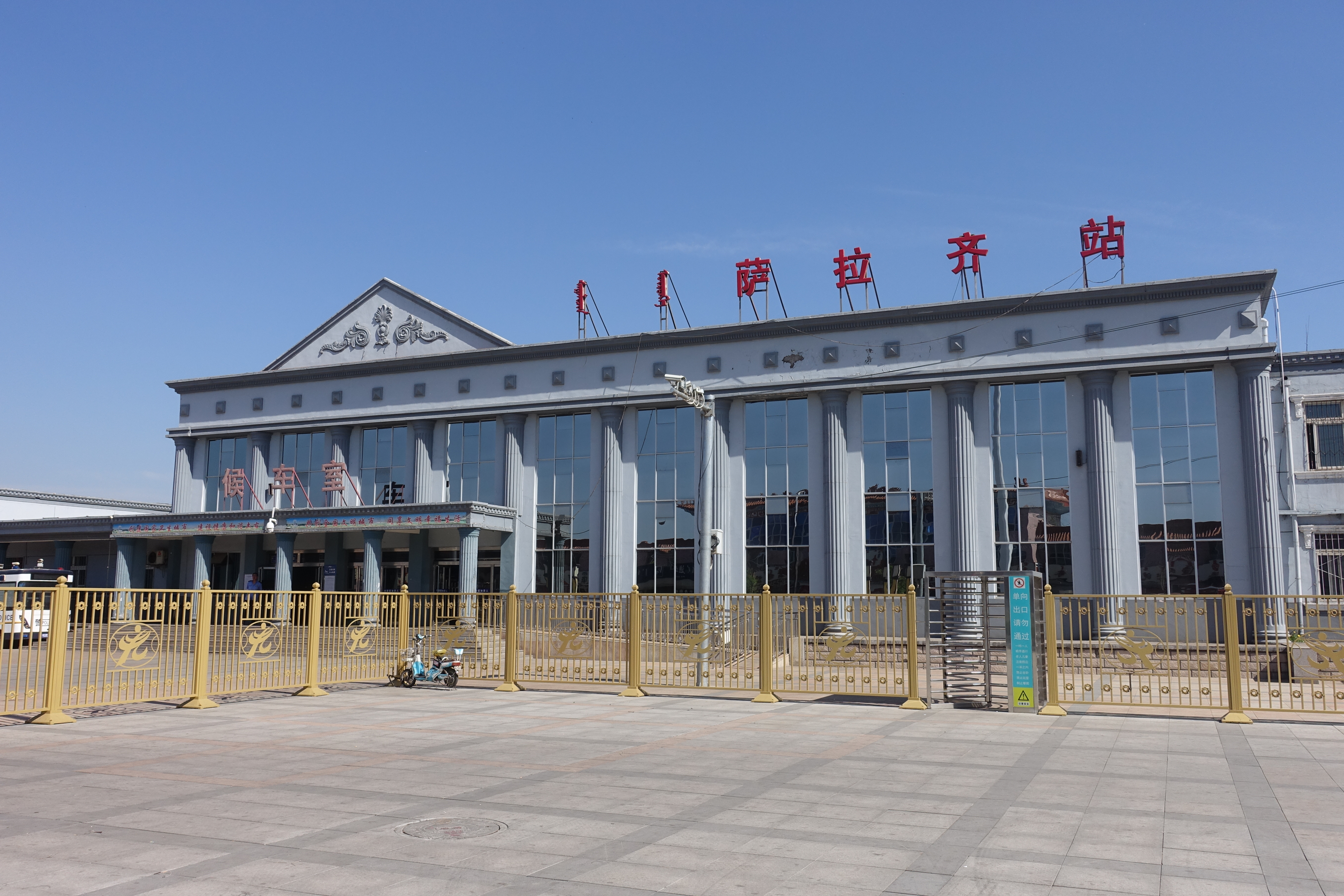

General information
- Location: Salaqi, Tumed Right Banner, Baotou, Inner Mongolia; China
- Operator: China Railway Hohhot Group
- Line: Beijing-Baotou railway

Other information
- Station code: SLC

History
- Opened: 1922
Location

Salaqi East railway station is a station of Jingbao Railway in Inner Mongolia. Before 2012 it was called Salaqi station.

== See also ==
- List of stations on Jingbao railway
