= Jining District =

Jining 集宁区 • ᠵᠢᠨᠢᠩ ᠲᠣᠭᠣᠷᠢᠭ Tsining, Chi-ning
- District
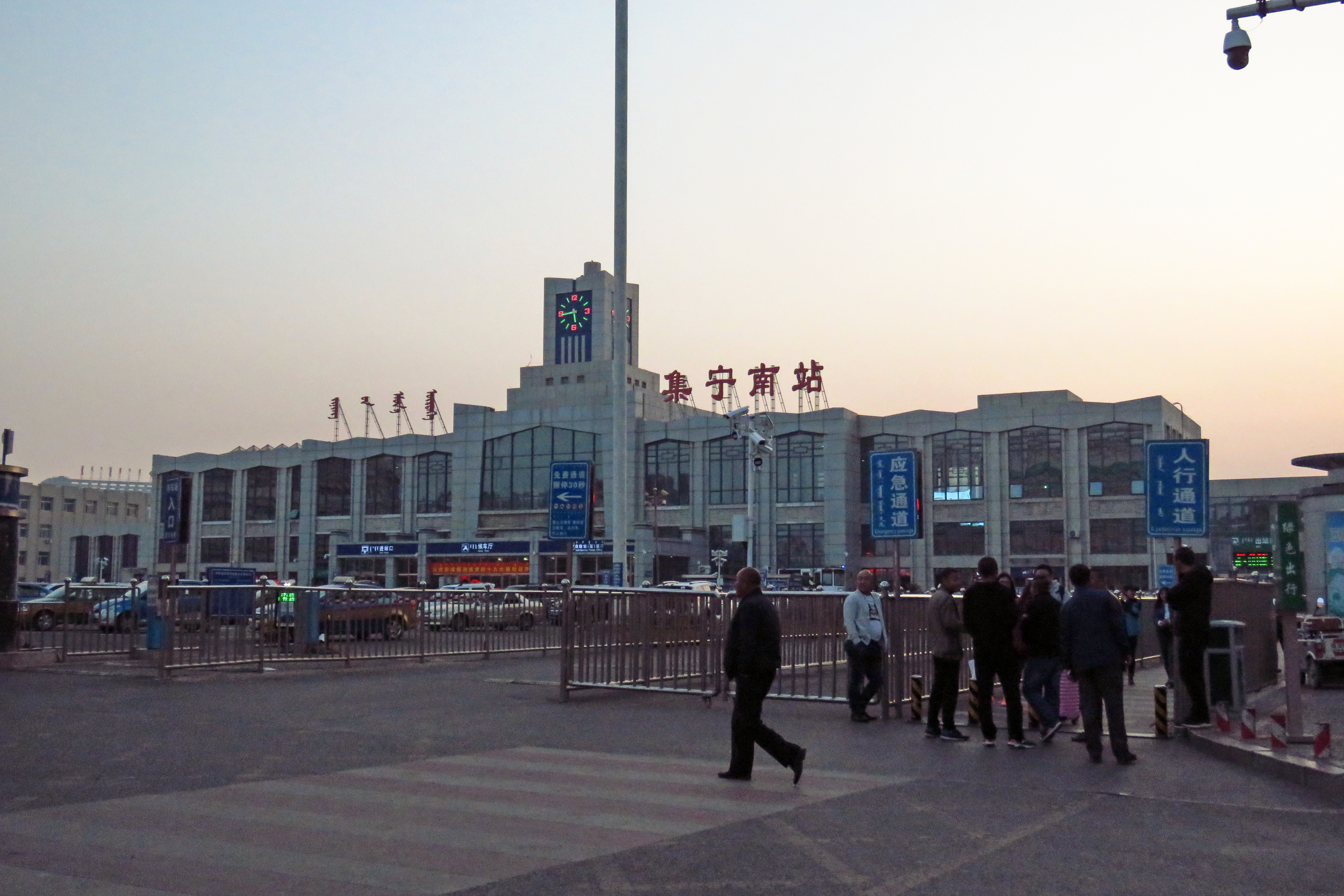
- Jining South Railway Station, c. 2017

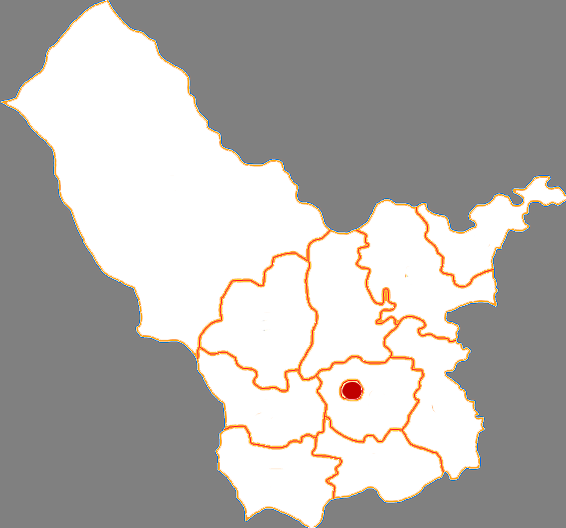
- Location in Ulanqab

- Location within Inner Mongolia Location within China
- Coordinates: 41°1′50.3″N 113°5′55.9″E
- Country: China
- Autonomous region: Inner Mongolia
- Prefecture-level city: Ulanqab
- City established: April 1956
- District established: April 2004
- District seat: Quanshan Subdistrict

Area
  - Total: 114.2 km^{2} (44.1 sq mi)

Population (2020)
  - Total: 425,059
  - Density: 3,722/km^{2} (9,640/sq mi)
- Time zone: UTC+8 (China Standard)
- Postal code: 012000
- Area code: 0474
- Website: www.jnq.gov.cn

Jining District

Chinese name
- Simplified Chinese: 集宁区
- Traditional Chinese: 集寧區
Transcriptions
Standard Mandarin
- Hanyu Pinyin: Jíníng Qū
Yue: Cantonese
- Jyutping: zaap^{6}ning^{4} keoi^{1}

Mongolian name
- Mongolian Cyrillic: Жинин тойрог
- Mongolian script: ᠵᠢᠨᠢᠩ ᠲᠣᠭᠣᠷᠢᠭ
Transcriptions
- SASM/GNC: Jiniŋ toɣoriɣ

Jining District (Mongolian: ᠵᠢᠨᠢᠩ ᠲᠣᠭᠣᠷᠢᠭ; Chinese: 集宁区) is an urban district that serves as the administrative seat of Ulanqab, a region governed as a prefecture-level city in the mid-western part of Inner Mongolia, China. It has an area of approximately 114.2 km^{2} and is in the southern foothills of the Yinshan mountains.

As of 2011, it had a population of roughly 377,100, including members of the Mongol, Hui, Manchu, Daur, Tibetan, Uyghur, Hmong, and Yi national minorities.

Administratively speaking, Ulanqab is a "city" and Jining a "district", in reality Jining is a de facto city, while Ulanqab is an administrative division covering a much larger area. See prefecture-level city for more information on this arrangement.

Jining South Railway Station (集宁南站) serves as a railway intersection: the Trans-Mongolian Railway terminates her and runs via the border town of Erenhot (Erlian) through Mongolia to Russia in the north, Hohhot and Baotou to the west, Shanxi province's Datong to the south, and the Jining–Tongliao railway to the east.

== History ==
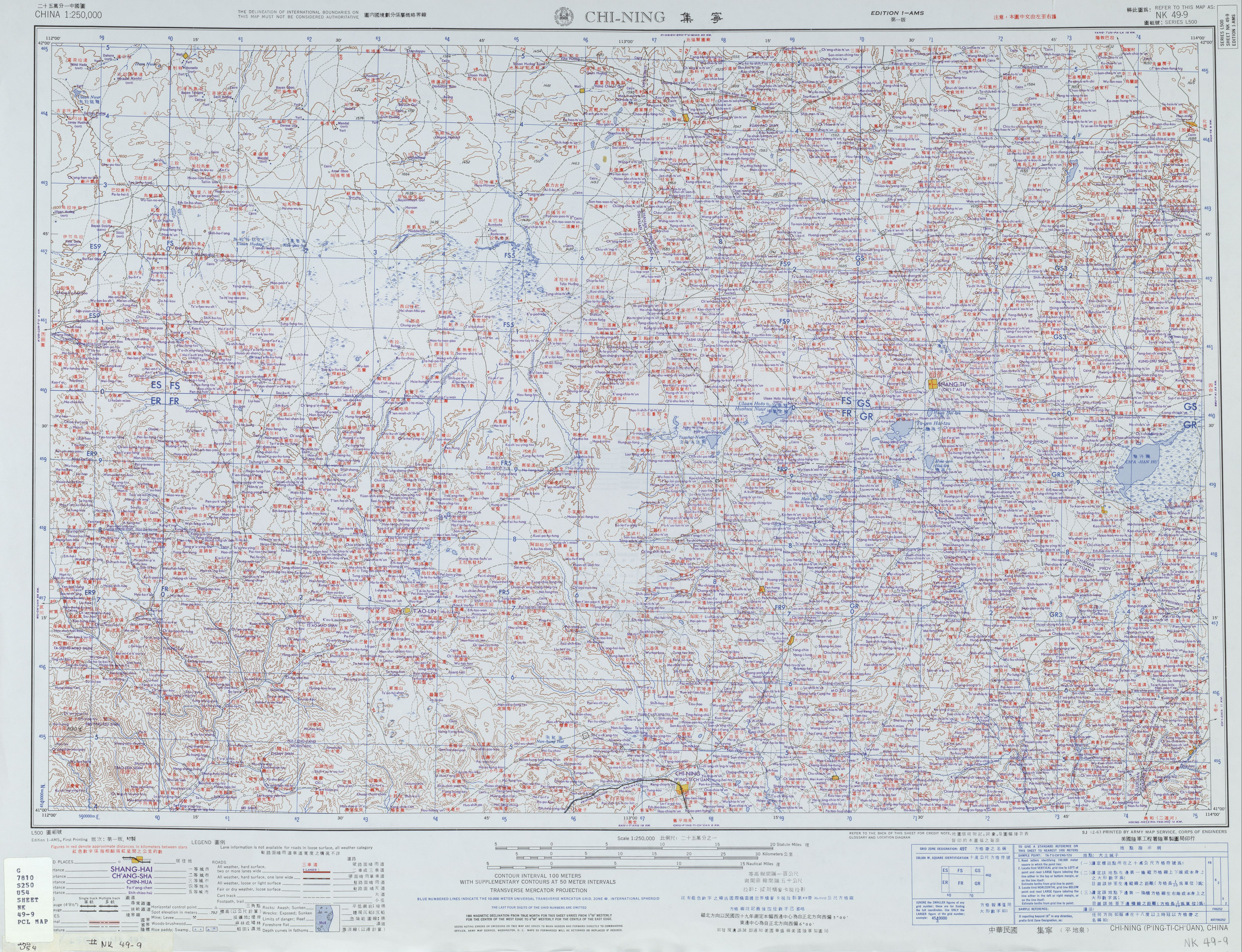
Map including Jining (labeled as 集寧 CHI-NING (P'ING-TI-CH'ÜAN)) (AMS, 1963)

Recorded human activity in the Jining area dates back to the Shang dynasty. It was originally named Bingzhou (并州). In the Song dynasty it was part of the Yunzhong Commandery (云中府); it was placed under the administration of Datong during the Jin dynasty (1115–1234). During the Yuan dynasty, it was named "Jining" for the first time. In 1675, the Jining area was placed under the administration of the Plain Yellow Banner of Chahar Province, and in 1750 was transferred to Fengzhen City's administration. In 1922, it was renamed Jining and became a municipality, and the following year a county. In 1948 Jining fell under the control of the Communist Party. The urban core was subsequently renamed Chengguan Town (roughly, "urban district"), then Pingdiquan Town (平地泉), then finally back to Jining in April 1956.

In 2004, Ulanqab League, to which it is the seat of government, was 'converted' to a prefecture-level city, and Jining is correspondingly changed from a county-level city to a district. Ulanqab is named Chaborte in the writings of P. Evariste Huc.

== Administrative divisions ==
Jining District is divided into 8 subdistricts, 1 town, and 1 township.

| Name | Simplified Chinese | Hanyu Pinyin | Mongolian (Hudum Script) | Mongolian (Cyrillic) | Administrative division code |
|---|---|---|---|---|---|
Subdistricts
| Xinti Road Subdistrict | 新体路街道 | Xīntǐlù Jiēdào | ᠰᠢᠨ ᠲᠢ ᠵᠠᠮ ᠤᠨ ᠵᠡᠭᠡᠯᠢ ᠭᠤᠳᠤᠮᠵᠢ | Шин ди замын зээл гудамж | 150902001 |
| Qiaodong Subdistrict | 桥东街道 | Qiáodōng Jiēdào | ᠴᠢᠶᠣᠤ ᠳ᠋ᠦᠩ ᠵᠡᠭᠡᠯᠢ ᠭᠤᠳᠤᠮᠵᠢ | Чяо дүн зээл гудамж | 150902002 |
| Qianjin Road Subdistrict | 前进路街道 | Qiánjìnlù Jiēdào | ᠴᠢᠶᠠᠨ ᠵᠢᠨ ᠵᠠᠮ ᠤᠨ ᠵᠡᠭᠡᠯᠢ ᠭᠤᠳᠤᠮᠵᠢ | Чонгийн замын зээл гудамж | 150902003 |
| Changqing Subdistrict | 常青街道 | Chángqīng Jiēdào | ᠴᠠᠩ ᠴᠢᠩ ᠵᠡᠭᠡᠯᠢ ᠭᠤᠳᠤᠮᠵᠢ | Цан чин зээл гудамж | 150902004 |
| Hushan Subdistrict | 虎山街道 | Hǔshān Jiēdào | ᠬᠤ ᠱᠠᠨ ᠵᠡᠭᠡᠯᠢ ᠭᠤᠳᠤᠮᠵᠢ | Хоо шин зээл гудамж | 150902005 |
| Qiaoxi Subdistrict | 桥西街道 | Qiáoxī Jiēdào | ᠴᠢᠶᠣᠤ ᠰᠢ ᠵᠡᠭᠡᠯᠢ ᠭᠤᠳᠤᠮᠵᠢ | Чяо ший зээл гудамж | 150902006 |
| Xinhua Street Subdistrict | 新华街街道 | Xīnhuájiē Jiēdào | ᠰᠢᠨᠬᠤᠸᠠ ᠵᠡᠭᠡᠯᠢ ᠭᠤᠳᠤᠮᠵᠢ | Шэнхуа зээл гудамж | 150902007 |
| Quanshan Subdistrict | 泉山街道 | Quánshān Jiēdào | ᠴᠢᠦᠸᠠᠨ ᠱᠠᠨ ᠵᠡᠭᠡᠯᠢ ᠭᠤᠳᠤᠮᠵᠢ | Чиован шин зээл гудамж | 150902008 |
Town
| Baihaizi Town | 白海子镇 | Báihǎizi Zhèn | ᠪᠠᠢ ᠬᠠᠢ ᠽᠢ ᠪᠠᠯᠭᠠᠰᠤ | Бай хай зи балгас | 150902105 |
Township
| Malianqu Township | 马莲渠乡 | Mǎliánqú Xiāng | ᠮᠠ ᠯᠢᠶᠠᠨ ᠴᠢᠦᠢ ᠰᠢᠶᠠᠩ | Ма лиан чюй шиян | 150902205 |

== Transportation ==
Jining is a major transport node in central Inner Mongolia. It is on the Beijing-Baotou railway, and the terminus of the Jining-Erenhot, Jining-Tongliao, and Trans-Mongolian railways, making the city a short connection away from urban centres such as Hohhot, Baotou, Zhangjiakou, Datong, and Beijing. High-speed rail access is available to Hohhot and Baotou; travel time to the regional capital is approximately an hour.

Jining is also on the route of China National Highway 208, China National Highway 110, and the G6 Beijing–Lhasa Expressway.

Intercity buses are available to neighboring cities and towns.

== Natural resources ==
The Jining area is a source of limestone and turquoise.
