= China Railway Hohhot Group =

Chinese railway operator

China Railway Hohhot Group Co., Ltd.
- Company type: state-owned enterprise
- Industry: Railway operations
- Predecessor: Hohhot Railway Administration
- Founded: 19 November 2017
- Headquarters: 30 Xilingol N Road, Xincheng, Hohhot, Inner Mongolia, China
- Area served: central Inner Mongolia
- Owner: Government of China
- Parent: China Railway
- Website: Official Weibo Website

China Railway Hohhot Group
- Simplified Chinese: 中国铁路呼和浩特局集团
- Traditional Chinese: 中國鐵路呼和浩特局集團
Transcriptions
Standard Mandarin
- Hanyu Pinyin: Zhōngguó Tiělù Hūhéhàotè Jú Jítuán

Hohhot Railway Administration
- Simplified Chinese: 呼和浩特铁路局
- Traditional Chinese: 呼和浩特鐵路局
Transcriptions
Standard Mandarin
- Hanyu Pinyin: Hūhéhàotè Tiělù Jú

CR Hohhot
- Simplified Chinese: 呼铁
- Traditional Chinese: 呼鐵
Transcriptions
Standard Mandarin
- Hanyu Pinyin: Hūtiě

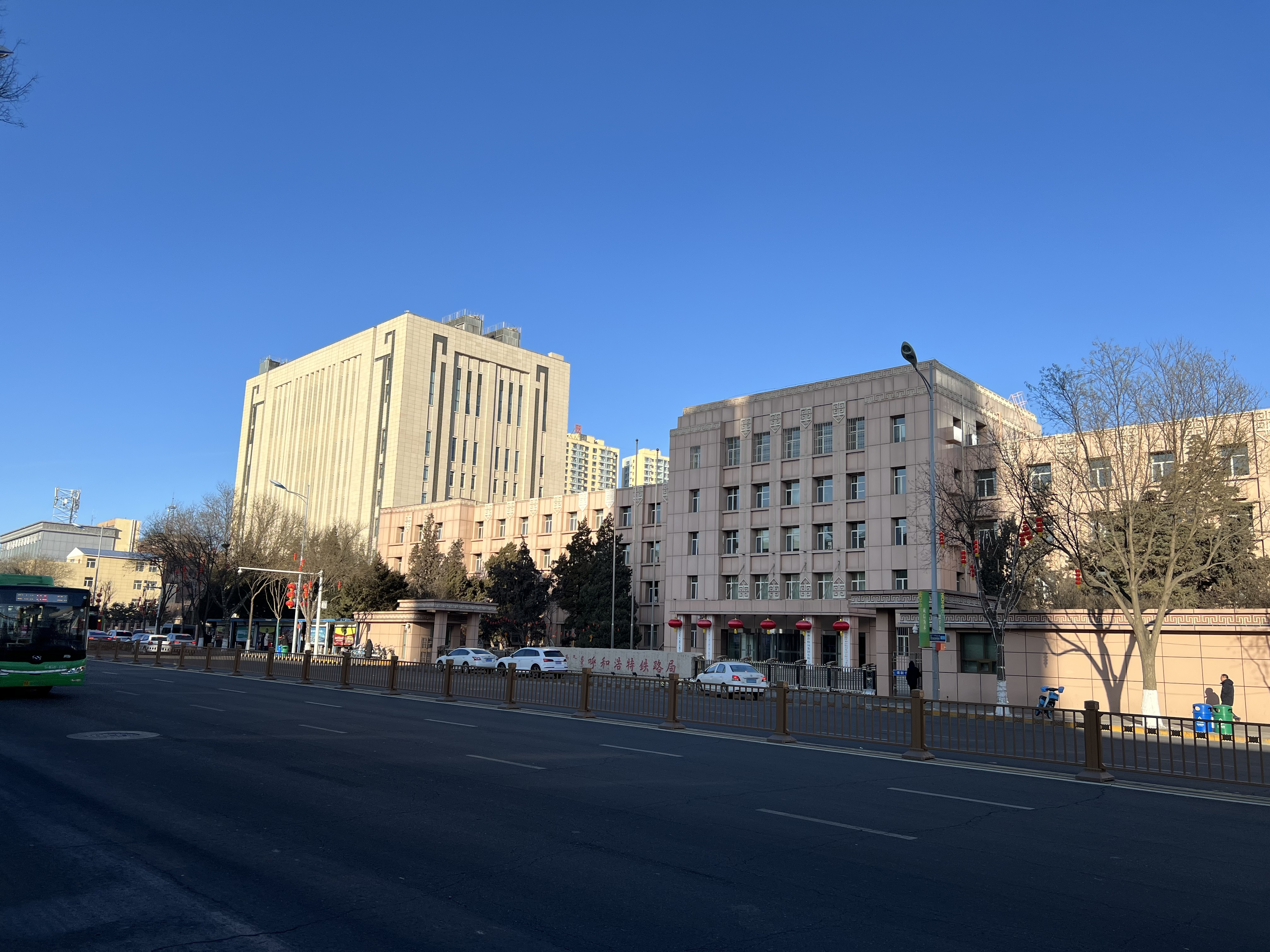
Headquarters of China Railway Hohhot Group Co., Ltd.

China Railway Hohhot Group, officially abbreviated as CR Hohhot or CR-Hohhot, formerly, Hohhot Railway Administration is a subsidiaries company under the jurisdiction of the China Railway (formerly the Ministry of Railway). The railway administration was reorganized as a company in November 2017.

It supervises the railway network within central Inner Mongolia.

== Hub stations ==
- Hohhot
  - Hohhot
- Baotou
  - Baotou, Baotou West
- Ulanqab
  - Jining
- Erenhot
  - Eren
