= G6 Beijing–Lhasa Expressway =

Expressway in China

Beijing–Lhasa Expressway
- 北京－拉萨高速公路
- Jingzang Expressway 京藏高速
- The Beijing–Lhasa Expressway, including planned/under construction sections, is highlighted in red.

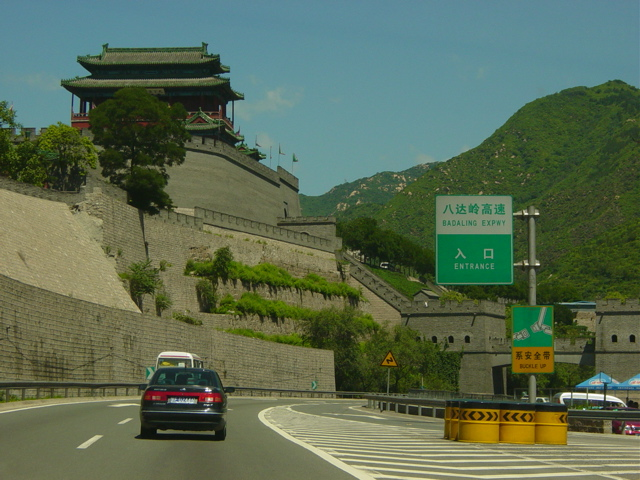
- G6 and the Juyong Pass

Route information
- Part of AH3 AH42
- Length: 3,710 km (2,310 mi) Length when complete.

Major junctions
- East end: 3rd Ring Road at Madian Bridge, Xicheng, BJ
- G4501 in Changping, BJ; G7 in Changping, BJ; G7 in Zhangjiakou, HE; G95 (S) in Zhangjiakou, HE; G95 (N) in Zhangjiakou, HE; G7 in Zhangjiakou, HE; G55 in Ulanqab, NM; G7 in Ulanqab, NM; G7 / G0601 (E / NE) in Hohhot, NM; G0601 (NW) in Hohhot, NM; G65 in Baotou, NM; G7 (W) in Bayannur, NM; G18 in Wuhai, NM; G0601 in Yinchuan, NX; G20 in Yinchuan, NX; G70 (N) in Yinchuan, NX; G2012 (E) in Wuzhong, NX; G2012 (W) in Wuzhong, NX; G70 (S) in Wuzhong, NX; G30 (N) in Lanzhou, GS; G30 (S) in Lanzhou, GS; G3001 in Lanzhou, GS; G0612 in Xining, QH; G0612 in Xining, QH; G0613 in Xining, QH; G0615 (E) in Delingha, QH; G0615 (W) in Delingha, QH; G3011 in Golmud, QH
- West end: Xiongka IC at Doilungdêqên District, Lhasa, XZ

Location
- Country: China

Highway system
- National Trunk Highway System; Primary; Auxiliary; National Highways; Transport in China
← G0513	→ G0601

The Beijing–Lhasa Expressway (simplified Chinese: 北京－拉萨高速公路; traditional Chinese: 北京－拉薩高速公路; pinyin: Běijīng－Lāsà gāosù gōnglù), commonly abbreviated to Jingzang Expressway (Chinese: 京藏高速), is part of the Chinese national expressway network and is planned to connect the nation's capital, Beijing, to the capital of the Tibet Autonomous Region, Lhasa.

It passes through seven of China's administrative regions, including the Beijing municipality, the province of Hebei, the autonomous regions of Inner Mongolia and Ningxia, the provinces of Gansu and Qinghai, and finally the Tibet Autonomous Region.

== Passage ==
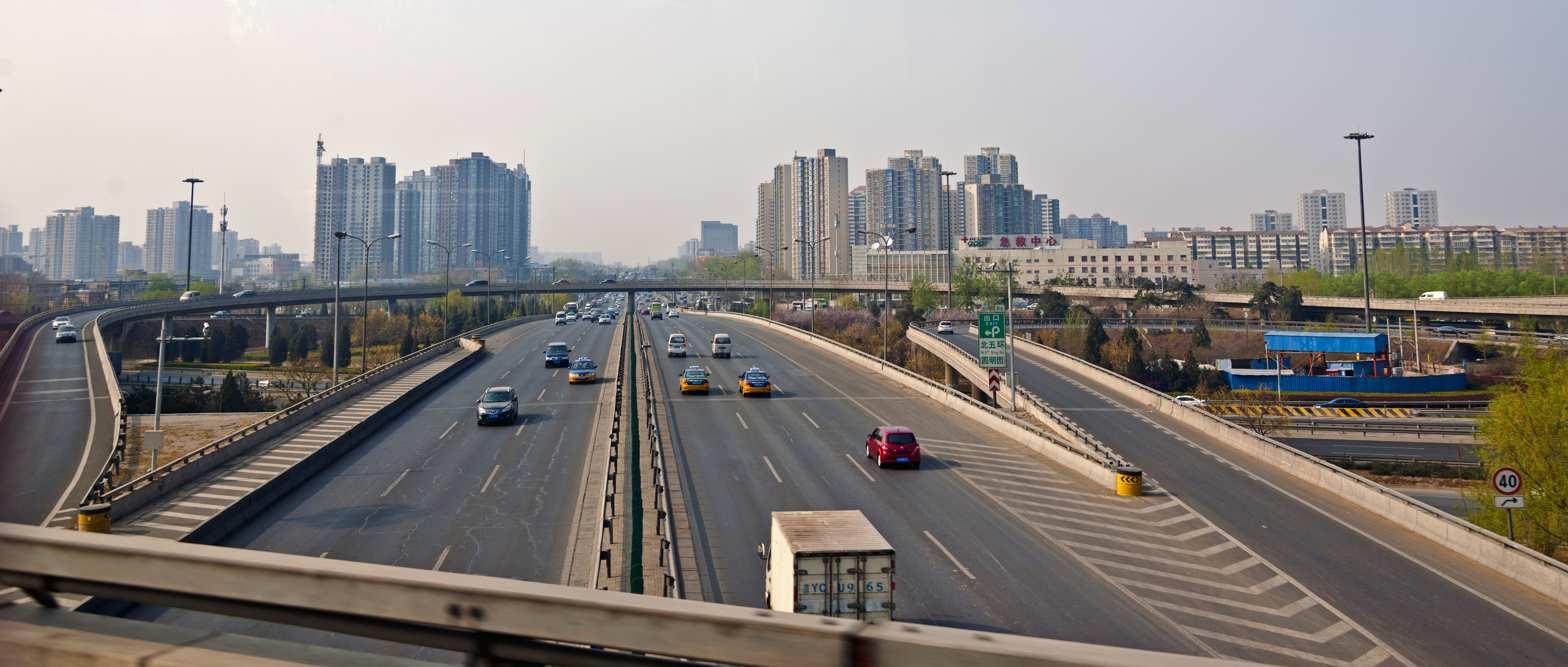
G6 Expressway at the interchange with the Fifth Ring Road in northern Beijing.

Beginning from Beijing and driving southwest to Lhasa, the expressway runs approximately 3,710 kilometres (2,310 miles) through Hebei, Inner Mongolia, Ningxia, Gansu and Qinghai, for a total of seven provincial-level divisions. Excluding the two terminal points, it passes through the major cities of Zhangjiakou, Jining District, Hohhot, Bayannur, Wuhai, Yinchuan, Wuzhong, Baiyin, Lanzhou, Xining and Golmud.

As of August 2010, just over fifty percent of the expressway is open to traffic, which mainly comprises the stretch between Beijing and Xining. Like China National Highway 109 and the Qingzang railway, it is expected to pass west through Golmud before heading southwest into Tibet and Lhasa. Because of climatic conditions, this stretch of the expressway does not yet have a construction timetable.

As of 2019 the expressway is completed between Beijing and Golmud, and the section between Nagqu and Lhasa was completed in August 2021. The mountainous section between Golmud and Nagqu is not yet shown on maps, and reserved for future plans.

The G6 merges with the G7 in Huhhot and does not split until Linhe (now Baynnur).

=== Ningxia ===
The expressway is of particular importance in Ningxia, where 86.7% of the urban population lives in cities along the expressway, and over 90% of the provincial GDP is generated in these cities. In 2020, a 2x4 lane bypass around Ningxia's capital Yinchuan was opened, and another 212 kilometres (132 miles) in Ningxia will be widened to 2x3 lanes.

== Detailed itinerary ==
From Beijing
Continues as Deshengmen Outer Street; G110 Road
	N 3rd Ring Road
Concurrent with G110 Road
1 A	Beitucheng W Rd Jiandemen station
1 B	Minzuyuan W Rd Olympic Sports Centre
2 A-B	N 4th Ring Road Asian Games Village; Zhongguancun
3 A	Zhixin Road; Anxiang Road
3 B	Qinghua Road; Datun Road Beishatan station Tsinghua University
4	Kehui Road
Qinghe Toll Station
6 A-B	N S50 5th Ring Road
8	S216 Road; Xiaoying Road
10	S216 Road; Anningzhuang Road; Jiancaicheng Road
Service Area
Beijing Metropolitan Area
12 A	S216 Road; Huangtudian Rd; Huilongguan
12 B	S216 Road; Huilongguan Rd; Huilongguan Longze station
16	S216 Road; X023 Road; Huilongguan Life Science Park station
20	S216 Road; Shayang Highway; Shahe
22	S216 Road; Baisha Road; Shahe; Towards Baishan-Xiaotangshan
25 A-B	North G4501 6th Ring Road
Baige Service Area
28	S216 Road; Baifuquan Road; Changping
Concurrent with G110 Road
32 A	S216 Road; G110 Road; Xiguan Road; Towards S212 Road; Changping Ming tombs Ming Tombs station
32 B	G7 Jingxin Expressway
36	S216 Road; Chenzhuang
40	S216 Road; S218 Road; Towards Nankou-Wenquan Line S2 S2线 Nankou station
46	S216 Road Great Wall-Juyong Pass Line S2 S2线 Juyongguan station
53	S216 Road Great Wall-Shuiguan Section
Turn from "Departing Beijing" towards "Beijing"
58	Badaling Great Wall-Badaling Line S2 S2线 Badaling station
62	S216 Road; S220 Road; Towards Kangzhuang-Yanqing
65	S216 Road; S217 Road; Kangzhuang
Kangzhuang Toll Station
Kangzhuang Service Area
Beijing City; Hebei Province
Donghuayuan Toll Station
76	X415 Road; Donghuayuan
96	G7 Jingxin Expressway; G110 Road; Tumu-Huailai
106	S241 Road; Towards G110 Road; Huailai
121	S346 Road; Old G110 Road; Towards G110 Road; Xibali
128	G110 Road; Xiahuayuan
	G95 Capital Ring Expressway
Concurrent with G95 Capital Ring Expressway
	S32 Xuanda Expressway; G110 Road; Gujiaying
Xuanhua Urban Area
154	G112 Road; Towards G110 Road; Xuanhua-Centre
Xuanhua Urban Area
Concurrent with G95 Capital Ring Expressway
161	G95 Capital Ring Expressway (Zhangcheng Expressway)
	G110 Road; Zhangjiakou
	Binhe S Road; Zhangjiakou
172	S010 Zhangshi Expressway (North of G6 Expressway to be renamed G1013 Haizhang Expressway)
Zhangjiakou Service Area
188	G207 Road; Towards G110 Road; Wanquan
Yujialiang Service Area
205	X401 Road; Towards G110 Road; Guoleizhuang
218	G110 Road; S247 Road; Huai'an
Huai'an Toll Station
Huai'an Service Area
	S45 Tianli Expressway
Hebei Province; Inner Mongolia Autonomous Region
273	X565 Road; Towards G110 Road; Xinghe
Xinghe Toll Station
	G110 Road; Xinghe
	S24 Xinba Expressway
	X201 Road; Towards G110 Road; E'erdong
	G110 Road; Xiaonao'er
	S54 Jining City Ring Expressway
Jining Service Area
Jining Urban Area
338	G208 Road; Jining
Jining Urban Area
	G55 Erguang Expressway
360	X552 Road; Towards G110 Road; Meiligaitu
Zhuozishan Service Area
389	G110 Road; Zhuozi
	G110 Road; Towards Qixiaying
Hohhot Metropolitan Area
Yulin Service Area
(1 A-B)	G7 Jingxin Expressway; G0601 Hohhot Ring Expressway
Concurrent with G7 Jingxin Expressway; Concurrent with G0601 Hohhot Ring Expressway
	S101 Road; Towards G110 Road; Hohhot-Centre
480	S104 Road; Hohhot-Centre; Towards Wuchuan
Hohhot Metropolitan Area
489	G110 Road; Hohhot-West; Taigemu
Concurrent with G0601 Hohhot Ring Expressway
(61)	G0601 Hohhot Ring Expressway
Service Area
509	G110 Road; Bikeqi
521	G110 Road; Chasuqi
Hasuhai Service Area
543	G110 Road; Taosihao
	G110 Road; Meidaizhao
579	G110 Road; Tumed Youqi
Baotou Metropolitan Area
	G65 Baomao Expressway
	G110 Road; X606 Road; Baotou-Centre
629	G210 Road; Baotou-Centre
645	G110 Road; Baotou-Centre
655	G110 Road; Baotou-Centre
663	G110 Road; Baotou-West
Baotou Metropolitan Area
Baiyanhua Service Area
	G110 Road; Baiyanhua
	G110 Road; Gongmiaozi
Wulashan (Mt Urad) Service Area
	G110 Road; Urad Qianqi
Xixiaozhao Service Area
	X708 Road; Xixiaozhao
807	S211 Road; Wuyuan
	G110 Road; Bayannur
Concurrent with G7 Jingxin Expressway
	G7 Jingxin Expressway
	Shuofang Rd; Bayannur
868	S312 Road; Bayannur
Linhe-Xinqu (Bayannur) Service Area
	X713 Road; Towards G110 Road; Chengguan
	Towards G110 Road; Toudaoqiao
Dengkou Service Area
937	Gangtie N Rd; Towards G110 Road; Dengkou
	S24 Xinba Expressway; Towards G110 Road; Balagong-Dengkou
951	G110 Road; Balagong
Wuhai Urban Area
1004	G110 Road; Wuhai-North
	Linyin Ave; Wuhai-Centre
1027	S215 Road; Wuhai-South
Wuhai Urban Area
	S215 Road; Hainan
	S33 Wuyin Expressway (To be renamed G1817 Wuyin Expressway)
Inner Mongolia Autonomous Region; Ningxia Hui Autonomous Region
Huinong Toll Station
Service Area
1079	G110 Road; Huinong
Huinong Service Area
1093	Towards G109 Road; Towards G110 Road; Hongguozi-Xiayingzi
1123	S301 Road; Shizuishan-Pingluo
Shahu Service Area
1142	X207 Road; Yaofu-Xidatan
1159	X207 Road; Towards G109 Road; Sishilidian
1167	G0601 Yinchuan Ring Expressway; G109 Road; Helan
Helan Service Area
Yinchuan Metropolitan Area
1177	Helanshan Road; Yinchuan-Centre
1186	G20 Qingyin Expressway; S102 Road; Yinchuan-East
1189	G0601 Yinchuan Ring Expressway
Yinchuan Metropolitan Area
1202	G109 Road; Yongning
Yongning Service Area
1224	G109 Road; S101 Road; Yesheng
1234	Hanba E Road; Qingtongxia
1238	S101 Road; Wuzhong
	S12 Guqing Expressway
1253	S101 Road; Gaozha
Guanmahu Service Area
1280	S19 Gunhong Expressway
Mingsha Service Area
1303	S101 Road; Mingsha
1317	G2012 Dingwu Expressway
Concurrent with G2012 Dingwu Expressway
1323	G109 Road; S101 Road; Zhongning
Concurrent with G2012 Dingwu Expressway
1334	G2012 Dingwu Expressway
1339	G109 Road; S101 Road; Changshantou
Xiaohongguo Service Area
	G70 Fuyin Expressway
	G109 Road; Datanchuan
Xingren Service Area
1414	S202 Road; Xingren
Xingren Toll Station
Ningxia Hui Autonomous Region; Gansu Province
Liuzhaike Toll Station
1425	G109 Road; Wuhe
1455	G109 Road; Wangjiashan
	Pingchuan
Xindun Service Area
	G109 Road; Pinchuan-Shuiquan
1504	G109 Road; S207 Road; Liuchuan
Baiyin-East Service Area
1533	G109 Road; Baiyin-East
	G109 Road; Baiyin-West
1572	G109 Road; Gaolan
1582	Lanqin High-speed way Shuifu
	G30 Lianhuo Expressway
Concurrent with G30 Lianhuo Expressway
	G30 Lianhuo Expressway; S13 Zhongchuan Airport Liaison Line (Formerly named S1 Lanying Expressway) (To be renamed G1816 Wuma Expressway)
1623	S201 Road; Lanzhou-West Lanzhou Botanical Garden
Lanzhou Metropolitan Area
1635	G109 Road; G312 Road; Hekou
Lanzhou Metropolitan Area
Zhangjiasi Service Area
1666	G109 Road; Huazhuang
	G109 Road; Haishiwan
Haishiwan Toll Station
Gansu Province; Qinghai Province
Machangyuan Toll Station
Machangyuan Service Area
	G109 Road; Machangyuan
1709	Minhe
1750	G109 Road; Ledu
Ledu Service Area
1779	G109 Road; S202 Road; Ping'an
	S11 Zhanghe Expressway (To be renamed G0611 Zhangwen Expressway)
Concurrent with S11 Zhanghe Expressway (To be renamed G0611 Zhangwen Expressway)
1784	Xining Caojiabao Airport
Xining Metropolitan Area
1779	G109 Road; Xining-East
1803	S1112 Ninghu Expressway
1814	S1113 Ninggui Expressesy; S103 Road; Xining-Centre
Concurrent with S11 Zhanghe Expressway (To be renamed G0611 Zhangwen Expressway)
1817	S11 Zhanghe Expressway (Formerly named as S1 Ningda Expressway) (To be renamed G0611 Zhangwen Expressway)
1819	Haihu Ave; Xining-North
1827	S103 Road; Dabuzi
	S103 Road; Xining-West
Xining Metropolitan Area
	S103 Road; Dabuzi
	S103 Road; Duba
Doba Toll Station
	G109 Road; G315 Road; Towards S20 Huangxi Expressway; Huangyuan
Under Construction
1911	G109 Road; G214 Road; Daotanghe
Daotanghe Toll Station
	G214 Road
	G214 Road; Gonghe
	N Huanghua Avenue; Gonghe
	Gongyu Expressway (To be named G0613 Xili Expressway)
	X301 Road; Towards Gonghe-Nandi
	X301 Road; Towards Nandi
	G109 Road; Dashuiqiao
	G109 Road; Chaka
Chaka Toll Station
Chaka Service Area
	S2013 Chade Expressway (To be renamed G0612 Xihe Expressway)
	G109 Road; Chaka
Under Construction
	G3011 Liyge Expressway
Qinghai Province; Tibet Autonomous Region
Towards Beijing

== See also ==
- Badaling Expressway (part of the G6 in Beijing)
- Expressways of China
- Jingzhang Expressway (part of the G6 in Hebei)
