= List of expressways in Inner Mongolia =

List of expressways in Inner Mongolia

== List of routes ==
=== National-level routes ===
Number	Name	Chinese name	Origin	Terminus	Length	Notes
G6	Jingzang Expressway	京藏高速	Xinghe (HE border)	Wuhai (XJ border)	821 km (510 mi)	
G7	Jingxin Expressway	京新高速	Wulanchabu City (SX border)	Mengganjie (GS border)	1,544 km (959 mi)	
G10	Suiman Expressway	绥满高速公路	Arun (HL border)	Manzhouli	380 km (240 mi)	
G12	Hunwu Expressway	珲乌高速公路	Baicheng (JL border)	Ulanhot	43 km (27 mi)	
G16	Danxi Expressway	丹锡高速公路	LN border	Xilinhot	309 km (192 mi)	
G18	Rongwu Expressway	荣乌高速公路	SX border	G6 south of Wuhai	520 km (320 mi)	
G25	Changshen Expressway	长深高速公路	LN border	JL border	45 km (28 mi)	
G45	Daguang Expressway	大广高速公路	Chengde (HE border)	G25 (JL border)	528 km (328 mi)	
G55	Erguang Expressway	二广高速公路	Erenhot	SX border	423 km (263 mi)	Erenhot-Saihantala under construction
G59	Hubei Expressway	呼北高速公路	Hohhot	SX border	91 km (57 mi)	
G65	Baomao Expressway	包茂高速公路	Baotou	SN border	225 km (140 mi)	
G0616	Wugan Expressway	乌甘高速	Urad FB	Ganqimaodu Port		Added in 2022 plan
G0712	Haizhang Expressway	额策高速	Ejin Banner	Ceke Port		Added in 2022 plan
G1013	Haizhang Expressway	海张高速	Hailar	HE border		Added in 71118; former portions of S20 and S27
G1015	Tieke Expressway	铁科高速	HL border	Horqin RMB		Added in 71118
G1017	Haijia Expressway	海加高速	Hailar	HL border		Added in 2022 plan
G1216	Wu'a Expressway	乌阿高速	Ulanhot	Arxan		Added in 71118, former portion of S21
G1611	Kecheng Expressway	克承高速	Hexigten	HE border		Added in 71118
G1612	Xier Expressway	锡二高速	Xilinhot	Erenhot		Added in 2022 plan, former S20
G1816	Wuma Expressway	乌玛高速	Wuhai	QH border		Added in 71118, former portion of S47
G1817	Wuyin Expressway	乌银高速	Wuhai	NX border		Added in 71118, former portion of S33
G2511	Xinlu Expressway	新鲁高速公路	LN border	Lubei (Jarud Banner)	249 km (155 mi)	
G2515	Luhuo Expressway	鲁霍高速	Lubei (Jarud Banner)	Holingol		Added in 71118, former S23
G4513	Naiying Expressway	奈营高速	Naiman Banner	LN border	57 km (35 mi)	Added in 71118
G4515	Chisui Expressway	赤绥高速	Chifeng	LN border		Added in 71118
G5511	Ji'a Expressway	集阿高速公路	Jining (Ulanqab)	Arun Banner		Qahar Right Banner–Hexigten Banner and Bairin Right Banner–Horqin Right Front Banner sections in planning stages
G5516	Suzhang Expressway	集阿高速公路	Sonid RB	HE border		Added in 71118; former portion of S42
G5901	Hohhot Ring Expressway	呼和浩特绕城高速	G6 west of Hohhot	G6 east of Hohhot	56 km (35 mi)	Was G0601 from 2013-2017

=== Provincial-level routes ===
Number	Chinese name	Origin	Terminus	Length	Notes
S20 Axi Expressway	阿锡高速	Alider	Xilinhot		Became a portion of G1013 in 2013
S20 Xi'er Expressway	锡二高速	Xilinhot	Erenhot		Redesignated as G1612 in 2022
S21 Haiwu Expressway	海乌高速	Hailar	Ulanhot		Became a portion of G1216 in 2013
S21 Keshe Expressway	科舍高速	Bayanhushu	Shebotu	110 km	Planned
S22 Hubai Expressway	察呼高速	Baiyinchagan	Hohhot	94 km	Under construction
S23 Luhuo Expressway	鲁霍高速	Lubei	Holingol		Redesignated as G2515 in 2013
S23 Shangshang Expressway	商尚高速	Shangdu	Shangyi (HE border)	55 km	Planned
S24 Xingba Expressway	兴巴高速	Xinghe (HE border)	Balagong	682 km	World's first highway designed for heavy trucks
S25 Ketong Expressway	科通高速	Baokeng (JL border)	Tongliao		Planned
S26 Zhunyin Expressway	准银高速	Longkou	Shanghai Temple (NX border)	558 km	Under construction
S27 Xizhang Expressway	锡张高速	Xilinhot	HE border		Became a portion of G1013 in 2013
S27 Hu'e Expressway	呼东高速	Hohhot	Ordos City	165 km	Under construction
S28 Tianwu Expressway	天乌高速	Ar Horqin Banner	Ongniud Banner	135 km	Planned
S29 Huliang Expressway	呼凉高速	Hohhot	Liangcheng	95 km	Planned
S30 Dongtu Expressway	东突高速	Dongfeng Forest Farm (JN border)	Tuquan North Bridge		Planned
S31 Huhe Expressway		Hohhot	Longkou (SX border)	156 km	Under construction
S32 Tong'a Expressway		Tongliao	Tianshan		Planned
S33 Wuyin Expressway	乌银高速	Wuhai	Touguan (NX border)		Became a portion of G1817 in 2013
S33 Aoming Expressway		Aolunbulage	Mingxi	105 km	Planned
S34 Chiweibao Expressway		Chifeng	Baolagen Taohai		Planned
S35 Eyan Expressway		Otog Banner (G18)	Yanchi (NX border)	164 km	Planned
S36 Buwu Expressway		Bulianghe (SX border)	Galutu		Planned
S37 Wuning Expressway	乌宁高速	Wuhai	Ningdong (NX border)	140 km	Planned
S39 Ganwu Expressway	乌甘高速	port of Ganqimaodu	Urad FB		Redesignated as G0616 in 2022
S40 Hohhot East Exit Expressway	呼和浩特东出口高速			4 km	Former S43
S41 Baoda Expressway	包达高速	Baotou Yellow River Bridge	Dalad Banner	29 km	
S42 Saizhang Expressway	赛张高速	Saihantala	Huade (HE border)		Became a portion of G5516 in 2013
S42 Baotou Ring Expressway	包头绕城高速	Beltway around Baotou		46 km	
S43 Huqing Expressway	呼清高速	Hohhot	Qingshuihe (SX border)	37 km	Under construction
S44 Baotou Airport Expressway	包头机场高速	Baotou (G65)	Baotou Airport	6 km	
S45 Suhu Expressway	苏呼高速	Sonid LB	Hohhot		Planned
S46 Ordos Airport Expressway	鄂尔多斯机场高速	Dongsheng, Ordos City	Ordos Airport	33 km	
S47 Haishi Expressway	海石高速	Hainan	Hainan (NX border)		Became a portion of G1816 in 2013
S47 Zhangcha Expressway	张查高速	Zhangjiafang	Chahartan	45 km	
S49 Longshu Expressway	龙树高速	Longkou	Shuerliang (SX border)		
S50 Hailar Ring Expressway	海拉尔绕城高速	Beltway around Hailar		27 km	Planned
S51 Ulanhot Ring Expressway	乌兰浩特绕城高速	Beltway around Ulanhot		41 km	Planned
S52 Tongliao Ring Expressway	通辽绕城高速	Beltway around Tongliao		37 km	Under construction
S53 Chifeng Ring Expressway	赤峰绕城高速	Beltway around Chifeng			
S54 Ulanqab Ring Expressway	集宁绕城高速	G7	G55	28 km	
S55 Nashi Expressway	那石高速	Narisong	Shiyanta (SX border)		Planned
S56 Baotou Ring Expressway	包头绕城高速	Beltway around Baotou			Renumbered to S42
S57 Dongsheng Ring Expressway	东胜绕城高速	Beltway around Dongsheng			
S57 Ajin Expressway	阿金高速	Alxa RB	Jinchang (SX border)		Planned
