= G0616 Urad Front Banner–Ganqimaodu Expressway =

Road in China

Urad Front Banner–Ganqimaodu Expressway
- 乌拉特前旗－甘其毛都高速公路
- Wugan Expressway 乌甘高速公路

Route information
- Auxiliary route of G6
- Length: 228 km (142 mi)

Major junctions
- North end: G242 in Urad Middle Banner, Bayannur, Inner Mongolia
- South end: G6 / G7 in Urad Front Banner, Bayannur, Inner Mongolia

Location
- Country: China

Highway system
- National Trunk Highway System; Primary; Auxiliary; National Highways; Transport in China
← G0615	→ G7

The G0616 Urad Front Banner–Ganqimaodu Expressway (Chinese: 乌拉特前旗—甘其毛都高速公路), also referred to as the Wugan Expressway (Chinese: 乌甘高速公路), is an under construction expressway in Inner Mongolia, China that connects Urad Front Banner to the China–Mongolia border at Urad Middle Banner. The expressway was previously known as the S39 Ganwu Expressway during the planning stage.
