= Protectorate General to Pacify the North =

Chinese military government

Common name (669–757)
- Traditional Chinese: 安北都護府
- Simplified Chinese: 安北都护府
Transcriptions
Standard Mandarin
- Hanyu Pinyin: Ānběi Dūhù Fù
- Wade–Giles: Anpei Tuhu Fu

Alternate Name (647–663)
- Traditional Chinese: 燕然都护府
- Simplified Chinese: 燕然都护府
Transcriptions
Standard Mandarin
- Hanyu Pinyin: Yànrán Dūhù Fù
- Wade–Giles: Yenjan Tuhu Fu

Alternate Name (663–669)
- Traditional Chinese: 瀚海都護府
- Simplified Chinese: 瀚海都护府
Transcriptions
Standard Mandarin
- Hanyu Pinyin: Hànhǎi Dūhù Fù
- Wade–Giles: Hanhai Tuhu Fu

Alternate Name (757–784)
- Traditional Chinese: 鎮北都護府
- Simplified Chinese: 镇北都护府
Transcriptions
Standard Mandarin
- Hanyu Pinyin: Zhènběi Dūhù Fù
- Wade–Giles: Chenpei Tuhu Fu

Seats of the Anbei protectorate
1 647–669: Yanran; 749–755: Hengsai (Urad Middle Banner)
2 669–687: Datong (Ejin Banner)
3 687–698: Xi'an (Minle County)
4 698–708: Yunzhong (Horinger County)
5 708–714: western Shouxiang (Wuyuan County)
6 714–749: Shouxiang (near Baotou)
7 755: near Urad Front Banner

The Protectorate General to Pacify the North or Grand Protectorate General to Pacify the North (647–784) was a Chinese military government established by the Tang dynasty in 647 to pacify the former territory of the Xueyantuo, which extended from Lake Baikal to the north, the Gobi Desert to the south, the Greater Khingan to the east, and the Altai Mountains to the west. It controlled the Mongolian Plateau from 647 to 682.

Its seat of government was first established as Yanran at Shanyu Tai, southwest of present-day Urat Middle Banner, the northern slope of Lang Shan. This was later shifted to Hanhai a short period before it was changed to Anbei. The seat of governance remained there until 687.

== History ==
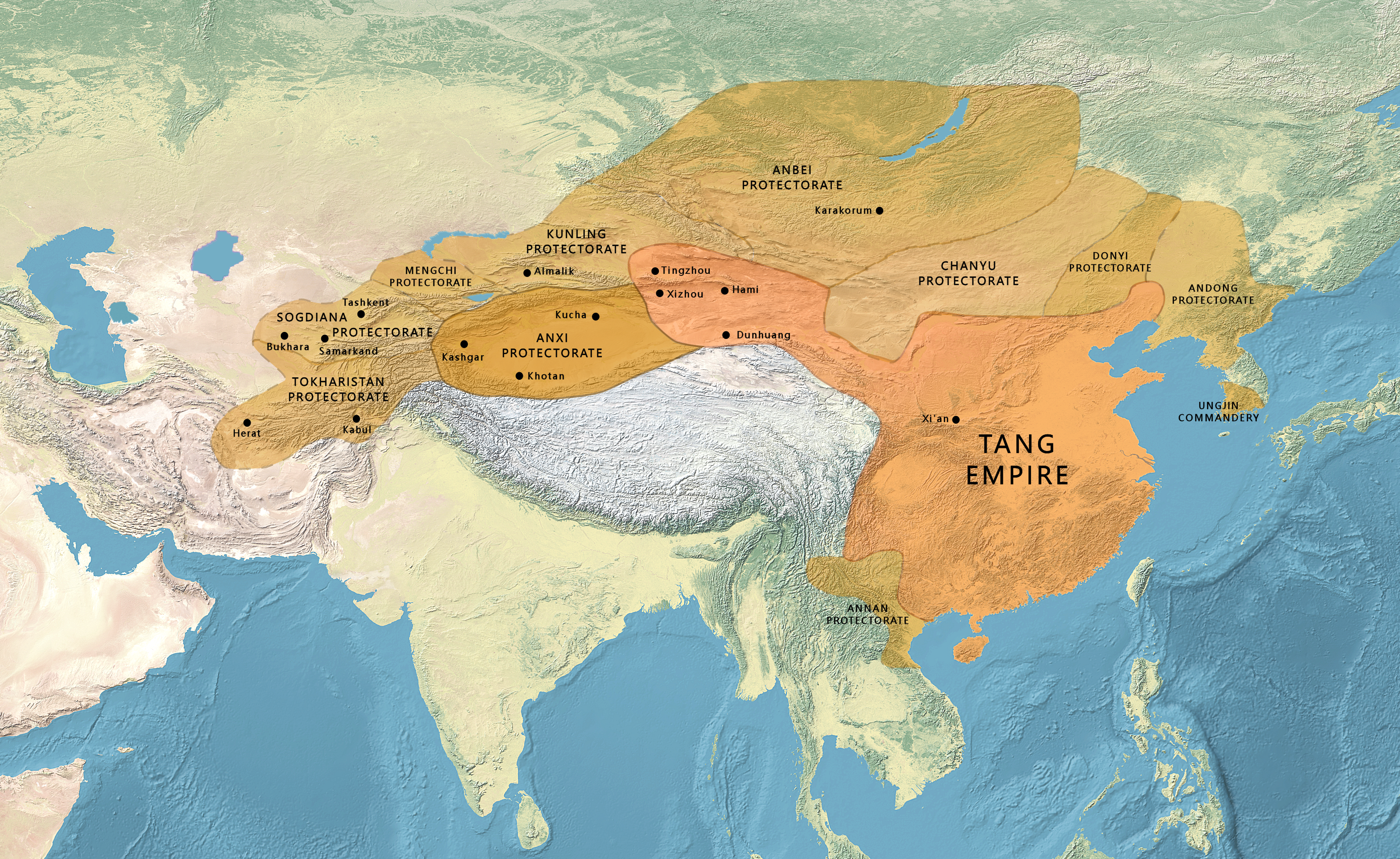
Map of the Tang Empire and its protectorates circa 660, including the "Anbei Protectorate" or "Protectorate General to Pacify the North".

=== Origin ===
In 629, the Tang started organizing surrendered nomadic tribes into bridle prefectures. This was formalized after the Eastern Turks were defeated in 630. Six prefectures under four area commands were created around Xia Prefecture in the southern Ordos Plateau (Guannei Circuit). The tribal chiefs were appointed as commanders-in-chief in charge of their prefecture and area command. Later, protectorates (duhu fu) were established in major frontier military garrisons staffed by regular Tang troops and led by a military commander. These protectorates administered larger and more remote tribes.

These bridle prefectures were governed indirectly for the most part and their chiefs retained their traditional powers. However they could receive visits from censors sent from the Tang civil bureaucracy to investigate the frontier. Bridle prefectures were responsible for sending tribute. After the Tiele tribes submitted in 646, to expedite the transport of the annual tribute of sable skins, a road with 60 relay stations providing horses and food into Mongolia was created. The bridle tribes were responsible for supplying the scribes and officials.

Some smaller bridle prefectures located in close proximity to area commands were directly governed by regular Tang officials. Ling Prefecture (Lingwu) was the site of a major garrison, the Shuofang Army, which oversaw the "Six Barbarian Prefectures" created in 679 and governed by "Tang people" selected by the court. These directly governed bridle prefectures were taxed and had their population registered in censuses. A Tang tax statute for the borderlands stipulated that "surrendered" barbarians were to be registered on tax rolls and classified into three categories based on their wealth. For two years, households in the superior grade paid ten silver coins, the middle grade five silver coins, and none for the inferior grade. In the third year, the superior grade paid two sheep, the middle grade one sheep, and the inferior grade one sheep for every three households. The sheep tax could be replaced by providing a saddled horse to the military for 30 days per year.

=== Early years and name changes ===
In 630 or 647, the Yanran Protectorate (later renamed to Hanhai and Anbei) was created at the Shanyu Plateau north of Wuyuan and west of Baotou. The Yanran Protectorate guarded the Ordos loop of the Yellow River in Inner Mongolia.

In 644, Zhenzhu Khan of the Xueyantuo attacked the Tang but was forced to retreat after Tang reinforcements counterattacked. However the Xueyantuo continued to harass the Turks, who fled south across the Yellow River into the ordos region.

In 645, the Uyghurs rebelled against the Xueyantuo. The Tang intervened and defeated the Xueyantuo. Emperor Taizong of Tang received the surrender of various tribes at Lingwu in 646 and organized them under a Tang administrative structure. The Tiele people were divided into six area commands and seven prefectures under the Yanran Protectorate. The Uyghurs were organized into the Hanhai Area Command ("Hanhai" referring to the Gobi Desert) covering Mongolia. The Uyghur elteber Tumidu was named Hanhai commander-in-chief. Their administration was indirect. However a road with 68 relay stations linking Uyghur territory to Chang'an was built for them to send tribute missions. When the Uyghur leader Tumidu was killed by his nephew Wuhe in 648, the Yanran Vice Protector-General Yuan Lichen lured the nephew to the protectorate headquarters with the promise of appointing him to Tumidu's posts. Wuhe arrived with only a few guards and was immediately arrested and executed. Taizong appointed Tumidu's son Porun to his father's former positions. Porun and his Uyghur troops later participated in the defeat of Chebi Khan in 650 and the Tang campaigns against the Western Turks in 657 under the Yanran Protector General and Vice Protector-General. Porun was given the title of Grand Silifa by the Tang court.

In 650, the Tang set up Wolf Mountain Prefecture where the Karluks lived under the jurisdiction of Hanhai (later Yunzhong Protectorate).

In 661, Porun died and his successor Bisudu waged war on the Tang. The Tang punitive campaign met with mixed results. The army under Xue Rengui captured three chiefs and returned while another division of 14,000 cavalry led by Zheng Rentai overextended too far into the Gobi Desert while pursuing the enemy baggage train. While returning southward, their food supplies ran out and they were accosted by a snowstorm. The soldiers abandoned their equipment, ate their horses, and resorted to cannibalism. Only 800 returned. The conflict ended in a peace deal brokered by the Tang general of Tiele origin, Qibi Heli. As part of the deal, Qibi Heli arrested and executed 200 tribal elites, but they may have been scapegoats, and Bisudu was not among them. According to Chen Hao, Bisudu fled and disappeared from Chinese sources. Dujiezhi (r. 680-?) succeeded Bisudu as ruler of the Uyghurs and may have been the Toquz Oghuz ruler who sought an alliance with the Tang and Khitans against the Second Turkic Khaganate, but was defeated by Ilterish Qaghan.

On 5 February 663 the Yanran Protectorate (on the northern bank of the Wujia River) was renamed Hanhai Protectorate. The old Hanhai Protectorate was renamed Yunzhong Protectorate. The Yunzhong Protectorate was renamed to the Chanyu Protectorate in 664 and located northwest of Horinger and south of Hohhot.

On 11 February 664, Emperor Gaozong of Tang appointed his 2-year-old son, Prince Yin, as Protector-General of the Chanyu Protectorate and ordered for a house to be built for him there. Two years later, Gaozong urged his son to leave for the Chanyu Protectorate, but Prince Yin begged his mom not to send him there. Gaozong relented and decided not to send him away.

In August 669 the Hanhai Protectorate was renamed the Protectorate General to Pacify the North, otherwise known as the Anbei Duhufu. A garrisoned fort was established on the steppes.

=== Turk rebellions ===
In 679, Ashide Wenfu and Ashide Fengzhi rebelled against the Chanyu Protectorate and backed Ashina Nishufu as their khagan. The Turk chiefs of 24 border districts joined them. Chief Administrator Xiao Siye of the Chanyu Protectorate, together with Hua Dazhi and Li Jingjia, were sent to combat the rebels. They won a battle but extended too far and was accosted by a snowstorm. The headquarters camp was caught in a surprise attack by the Turks at night north of the protectorate's seat. They plundered the camp's provisions and killed many of the officers and men, forcing Xiao to retreat due to the lack of supplies. The next Tang general, Pei Xingjian, arrived at Shuo Prefecture and hid his soldiers in 300 supply carts while ordering the weak soldiers to escort the carts and lure the Turks into the trap. When the Turks took the bait and attacked the escorts, the hidden Tang troops ambushed them and forced them to retreat. The fleeing Turk troops were caught by Tang soldiers deployed in strategic locations. In the spring of 680, Pei Xingjian defeated Fengzhi's army at Heishan ("Black Mountain") and captured him. Nishufu was killed by his subordinate and his head was sent to the Tang emperor. The remaining Turk rebels continued to attack the Tang throughout 680 and 681.

Ashina Funian, a relative of Illig Khagan, the last ruler of the Eastern Turkic Khaganate, proclaimed himself khagan in Xià Prefecture and united the forces of Ashide Wenfu. Pei Xingjian was appointed to campaign against the Turks again on 16 February 681. The vice commander, Cao Huaishun, was sent as a vanguard to attack the Turks but he failed to find the enemy before exhausting his troops. When he finally caught Wenfu to the north of the Great Wall, a minor clash occurred before the two sides disengaged. Meanwhile, Funian had kidnapped Cao's wife, children, and captured his supplies. On 9 June 681, Cao attacked Funian without success. The next day, Funian took advantage of change in wind and routed Cao's forces. However, when the Turk khagan returned to camp, he found that his wife and children had been kidnapped by Tang forces led by Cheng Wuting. Cheng led the forces stationed in Chanyu Protectorate to attack Funian while the Uyghurs and Toquz Oghuz tribes attacked Funian from the north. Funian and Wenfu surrendered to Pei Xingjian on 16 November 681. They were sent to Chang'an where they were beheaded in the marketplace along with 52 other Turk leaders. Tonyukuk and Bilge Qaghan blamed the failed uprising on the Turks for being disloyal. When they surrendered to the Tang emperor again, he was irritated by their revolt and threatened to kill all the Turks.

=== Second Turkic Khaganate ===
In 683, Ilterish Qaghan besieged the Chanyu Protectorate and killed the adjutant Zhang Xingshi.

In 686, the status of the Chanyu Protectorate was downgraded to zhenshou shi (defense commissioner).

In 687, Anbei's seat of government was moved to the east of Tsetserleg, then Tongcheng southeast of Ejin Banner (one source gives this a date of 685), then Xi'an northwest of Minle and southeast of Zhangye.

In 696, Qapaghan Qaghan demanded the return of all Turk households that had surrendered to the Tang, the lands of the Chanyu Protectorate, and grain seeds, farm tools, iron, and silk.

In 698, Anbei's seat was moved to the old town of Yunzhong to the northwest of Horinger.

=== 8th century ===
In 708 Anbei's seat was moved to the Western Shouxiang city near modern Wuyuan County, Inner Mongolia. Western Shouxian city was a center of Tang-Turk trade. The Tang sent several hundred thousand bolts of silk every year to Western Shouxiang city to trade for Turk horses.

In 709, Emperor Zhongzong of Tang re-established military garrisons at the cities of Western, Middle, and Eastern Shouxiang to protect the northern loop of the Yellow River in Inner Mongolia.

In 714 the Chanyu Protectorate was revived in Yunzhong while Anbei was re-located to the Middle Shouxiang city, near modern Baotou.

After the death of Qapaghan Qaghan in 715, various tribes arrived along the Tang northern borderlands and some Turks were allowed to settle in the northern Ordos Plateau. Some of them rebelled. Wang Jun (660–732) led reinforcements to the west of the Yellow River, killing 1,500 enemies and capturing some 1,400 people as well as livestock. As a reward he was appointed head of troops and stationed in northern Guannei.

In 720, Wang Jun suspected that two Toquz Oghuz tribes camping along the northern loop of the Yellow River were plotting to pillage cities in the region. He sent a secret message to the Emperor requesting permission to kill them. In the autumn Wang lured over 800 tribal leaders to a banquet and killed them in an ambush. To the west, two Toquz Oghuz tribes became alarmed by Wang Jun's actions, but the military chief of the region, Zhang Yue, personally went to their tents to placate them. The next year, the Toquz Oghuz tribes of northern Hedong sent troops to help Wang Jun in putting down a rebellion in Guannei.

In 749 the seat was moved to the military settlement of Hengsai, near modern-day Urad Middle Banner.

Due to unfavorable farming conditions near the Hengsai settlement, Guo Ziyi resettled the army near modern Urad Front Banner in 755 and renamed it Da'an and then Tiande Army.

Following the An Lushan Rebellion from 755 to 763, the Chanyu and Anbei protectorates lost any real authority and survived in name only. Due to the taboo of An Lushan's name, the Anbei Protectorate was renamed the Zhenbei Protectorate in 757, which meant "Protectorate General to Suppress the North." In 758, it was relocated to Western Shouxiang city. The Chanyu Protectorate came under control of the Zhenwu Jiedushi (758–764).

In 840 a group of Uyghurs attacked the Tiande Army.

In 843 the Chanyu Protectorate was renamed back to Anbei Protectorate.

== List of protector generals ==
- Li Suli (李素立), 647–649
- Jiang Jian (姜簡)
- Ren Yaxiang (任雅相)
- Liu Shenli (劉審禮), 661
- Jiang Xie (姜協)
- Zang Shan'an (臧善安)
- Pang Tongfu (龐同福)
- Li Dazhi (李大志), after 672
- Sun Jun (孫俊), 694
- Li Dan (李旦), otherwise known as Emperor Ruizong of Tang, 699–702 (actual administrator Xiao Siye)
- Zang Huailiang (臧懷亮)
- Wang Jun (王晙), before 714
- Li Sizhi (李嗣直)
- Zhang Zhiyun (張知運), around 716
- Zang Huaike (臧懷恪)
- Zang Xizhuang (臧希莊), 729
- Tian Wan (田琬)
- Li Guangbi (李光弼), 745–746
- Li Wan (李琬), 749
- Guo Ziyi (郭子儀), 749–754
- Li Linfu (李林甫)
- Zang Fangzhi (臧方直)
- Pugu Huai'en (僕固懷恩), 762

== Jiedushi ==
- Li Zhongshun (李忠順), 843–845
- Qi Bitong (契苾通), 852–854
- Gao Chenggong (高承恭), 861–863
- Shi Shanyou (石善友), 893–903
- Li Cunjin (李存進), 923

== See also ==
- Administrative divisions of the Tang dynasty
- Epitaph of Pugu Yitu
- History of Mongolia
- Horses in East Asian warfare
- Military history of China before 1912
- Protectorate General to Pacify the East
- Protectorate General to Pacify the West
- Protectorate General to Pacify the South
- Tang dynasty in Inner Asia

== Bibliography ==
- Andrade, Tonio (2016), The Gunpowder Age - China, Military Innovation, and the Rise of the West in World History, Princeton University Press, ISBN 978-0-691-13597-7.
- Asimov, M.S. (1998), History of civilizations of Central Asia Volume IV The age of achievement: A.D. 750 to the end of the fifteenth century Part One The historical, social and economic setting, UNESCO Publishing.
- Barfield, Thomas (1989), The Perilous Frontier - Nomadic Empires and China, Basil Blackwell.
- Barrett, Timothy Hugh (2008), The Woman Who Discovered Printing, Great Britain: Yale University Press, ISBN 978-0-300-12728-7.
- Beckwith, Christopher I (1987), The Tibetan Empire in Central Asia - A History of the Struggle for Great Power among Tibetans, Turks, Arabs, and Chinese during the Early Middle Ages, Princeton University Press.
- Bregel, Yuri (2003), An Historical Atlas of Central Asia, Brill.
- Chen, Hao (2021), A History of the Second Türk Empire (ca. 682–745 AD), Brill.
- Drompp, Michael Robert (2005), Tang China And The Collapse Of The Uighur Empire - A Documentary History, Brill.
- Ebrey, Patricia Buckley (1999), The Cambridge Illustrated History of China, Cambridge: Cambridge University Press, ISBN 0-521-66991-X.
- Ebrey, Patricia Buckley; Walthall, Anne; Palais, James B. (2006), East Asia - A Cultural, Social, and Political History, Boston: Houghton Mifflin, ISBN 0-618-13384-4.
- Golden, Peter B. (1992), An Introduction to the History of the Turkic Peoples - Ethnogenesis and State-Formation in Medieval and Early Modern Eurasia and the Middle East, OTTO HARRASSOWITZ · WIESBADEN.
- Graff, David A. (2002), Medieval Chinese Warfare, 300-900, Warfare and History, London: Routledge, ISBN 0415239559.
- Graff, David Andrew (2016), The Eurasian Way of War Military Practice in Seventh-Century China and Byzantium, Routledge, ISBN 978-0-415-46034-7.
- Haywood, John (1998), Historical Atlas of the Medieval World, AD 600-1492, Barnes & Noble.
- Latourette, Kenneth Scott (1964), The Chinese, their history and culture, Volumes 1-2, Macmillan.
- Lorge, Peter A. (2008), The Asian Military Revolution - from Gunpowder to the Bomb, Cambridge University Press, ISBN 978-0-521-60954-8.
- Millward, James (2009), Eurasian Crossroads - A History of Xinjiang, Columbia University Press.
- Needham, Joseph (1986), Science & Civilisation in China, vol. 7: The Gunpowder Epic, Cambridge University Press, ISBN 0-521-30358-3.
- Rong, Xinjiang (2013), Eighteen Lectures on Dunhuang, Brill.
- Schottenhammer, Angela (2023), China and the Silk Roads (ca. 100 BCE to 1800 CE): Role and Content of Its Historical Access to the Outside World, Brill
- Shaban, M. A. (1979), The ʿAbbāsid Revolution, Cambridge: Cambridge University Press, ISBN 0-521-29534-3.
- Sima, Guang (2015), Bóyángbǎn Zīzhìtōngjiàn 54 huánghòu shīzōng 柏楊版資治通鑑54皇后失蹤, Yuǎnliú chūbǎnshìyè gǔfèn yǒuxiàn gōngsī, ISBN 978-957-32-0876-1.
- Skaff, Jonathan Karam (2012), Sui-Tang China and Its Turko-Mongol Neighbors - Culture, Power, and Connections, 580-800 (Oxford Studies in Early Empires), Oxford University Press.
- Skaff, Jonathan Karam (2026), Silk Roads, Steppe Roads: History Unearthed from the Tombs of Medieval China, Princeton University Press
- Wang, Zhenping (2013), Tang China in Multi-Polar Asia - A History of Diplomacy and War, University of Hawaii Press.
- Wilkinson, Endymion (2015). Chinese History - A New Manual, 4th edition. Cambridge, MA: Harvard University Asia Center distributed by Harvard University Press. ISBN 9780674088467..
- Yang, Shao-yun (2023), Early Tang China and the World, 618–750 CE, Cambridge University Press
- Yuan, Shu (2001), Bóyángbǎn Tōngjiàn jìshìběnmò 28 dìèrcìhuànguánshídài 柏楊版通鑑記事本末28第二次宦官時代, Yuǎnliú chūbǎnshìyè gǔfèn yǒuxiàn gōngsī, ISBN 957-32-4273-7
- Xiong, Victor Cunrui (2000), Sui-Tang Chang'an - A Study in the Urban History of Late Medieval China (Michigan Monographs in Chinese Studies), U OF M CENTER FOR CHINESE STUDIES, ISBN 0892641371.
- Xiong, Victor Cunrui (2008), Historical Dictionary of Medieval China, United States of America: Scarecrow Press, ISBN 978-0810860537.
- Xiong, Victor Cunrui (2023), Heavenly Empress：The Age of Wu Zetian, Ainosco Press
- Xue, Zongzheng (1992), Turkic peoples, 中国社会科学出版社.
