= G1816 Wuhai–Maqên Expressway =

Expressway in China

Wuhai–Maqên Expressway
- 乌海－玛沁高速公路

Location
- Country: China

Highway system
- National Trunk Highway System; Primary; Auxiliary; National Highways; Transport in China
← G1815	→ G1817

The Wuhai–Maqên Expressway (Chinese: 乌玛高速; pinyin: Wūmǎ gāosù), designated G1816, is an expressway in China's Inner Mongolia, Ningxia and Gansu provinces.

It is complete between Shizuishan and Qingtongxia in Ningxia and between Guanghe County and Hezuo in Gansu. In November 2020, the section between Jingtai and Lanzhou New Area opened. In December 2021, the section between Qingtongxia and Zhongwei opened.

It has been designated as a National Trunk Highway since 2013, but parts of the road were already built as provincial expressways at the time.

== Route table ==
Location	km	mi	Exit	Name	Destinations	Notes
G1816 Wuhai–Maqên Expressway
Shizuishan, Ningxia				Dawukou	G110	Current terminus of G1816
Shizuishan, Ningxia				Shizuishan Ring Expressway		
Yinchuan, Ningxia	Shiyin Toll Station					
Yinchuan, Ningxia				Zhenbeibao	G110	toll free, exit southbound only
Yinchuan, Ningxia				Wenchang Road	G0601, G2004	toll free
Yinchuan, Ningxia				Pingjibao Interchange	S104	toll free
Yinchuan, Ningxia				Beijing Road	Beijing West Road	toll free
Yinchuan, Ningxia				Pingjibao	G0601	toll free
Yinchuan, Ningxia				...	G1817	
Yinchuan, Ningxia				Huangyangtan	Yinhuang Highway	
Yinchuan, Ningxia				Minning	S201	
Wuzhong, Ningxia				S201		
Wuzhong, Ningxia				G2012, S12, S27		
Wuzhong, Ningxia				Qingtongxia	G109	
Zhongwei, Ningxia				Qukou		
Zhongwei, Ningxia				Shikong Industrial Park		
Zhongwei, Ningxia				Zhenluo		
Zhongwei, Ningxia				Zhongwei North		
Zhongwei, Ningxia				Yingshuiqiao		
Zhongwei, Ningxia				G2012		
Zhongwei, Ningxia				Gantang	S201	
Zhongwei, Ningxia				Yingpanshui	S201	
Baiyin, Gansu	Jingtai Parking Area					
Baiyin, Gansu				G2012		
Baiyin, Gansu				Jingtai South	G338	
Baiyin, Gansu				Xiquan	S201	
Baiyin, Gansu				Zhenglu	S201	
Lanzhou, Gansu				Shangchuan	S201	
Lanzhou, Gansu				Lanzhou New Area North/Zhongchuan		
Lanzhou, Gansu				Chenjiawan Interchange (Lanzhou Zhongchuan Airport)	S1	
Lanzhou, Gansu				Wangjiaping Interchange	G6	
Lanzhou, Gansu				Yanchi North		
Lanzhou, Gansu				Xiaojiayao Interchange	G30	
Lanzhou, Gansu				Jiuzhou		Unknown route between Lanzhou and Dingxi
Dingxi, Gansu			36	Zhongpu	G212	
Dingxi, Gansu			44	Taishi	G212	
Dingxi, Gansu	Taishi Service Area					
Dingxi, Gansu			56	Kangjiaya	G75, S2	
Linxia City, Gansu				Sanjiaji	G212, S103, S309	
Linxia City, Gansu				Guanghe	S311	
Linxia City, Gansu			43	Hezheng	S311, S317	
Linxia City, Gansu			76	Linxia	S309	
Linxia City, Gansu	Linxia Service Area					
Linxia City, Gansu			82	Xinji	G213	
Linxia City, Gansu				S34 Gonglin Expressway		
Linxia City, Gansu			133	Wangge'ertang	S312, G213	
Linxia City, Gansu				Hezuo North	S324	
Linxia City, Gansu				Hezuo South	S2, G213	Current terminus of G1816
Closed/former; Concurrency terminus; HOV only; Incomplete access; Tolled; Route transition; Unopened
