= G2004 Yinchuan Ring Expressway =

Road in China

Yinchuan Ring Expressway
- 银川绕城高速公路

Route information
- Length: 59.3 km (36.8 mi)

Major junctions
- Orbital around Yinchuan

Location
- Country: China

Highway system
- National Trunk Highway System; Primary; Auxiliary; National Highways; Transport in China
← G2003	→ G2011

The Yinchuan Ring Expressway (Chinese: 银川绕城高速), designated as G2004, is an expressway in Ningxia, Northern China orbiting the city of Yinchuan. This expressway is a branch of G6 Beijing–Lhasa Expressway.

== Detailed itinerary ==
Clockwise
(1189)	G6 Jingla Expressway
Yinchuan-South Toll Station
1	G109 Road; Wangyuan; Yinchuan-East
7	S Qinshui Street; S Zhengyuan Street; Yinchuan-Centre
9	Tongda S Street Yinchuan Botanical Garden
16	Wenchang S Street; Yinchuan-West
22 A-B	S5 Yinba Expressway (To be renamed G1817 Wuyin Expressway); S27 Shizhong Expressway (To be renamed G1816 Wuma Expressway); S102 Road Western Xia tombs
Concurrent with S27 Shizhong Expressway (To be renamed G1816 Wuma Expressway)
26	W Beijing Ave; Towards G110 Road; Yinchuan-West
33	X103 Road; Towards G110 Road Gunzhongkou Scenic Area
Zhenbeibu Service Area
Concurrent with S27 Shizhong Expressway (To be renamed G1816 Wuma Expressway)
39	S27 Shizhong Expressway (To be renamed G1816 Wuma Expressway); Towards G110 Road; Zhenbeibu
43	N Wencui Street; Yinchuan-West
50	N Qinshui Street; Yinchuan-Centre Yuehai Park
53	N Zhengyuan Street; Yinchuan-Centre
Yinchuan-North Toll Station
Yinchuan Metropolitan Area
58	G6 Jingla Expressway
	G109 Road; Helan
Counterclockwise
