= G2011 Qingdao–Xinhe Expressway =

Road in Shandong, China

Qingdao–Xinhe Expressway
- 青岛－新河高速公路
- Qingxin Expressway 青新高速公路
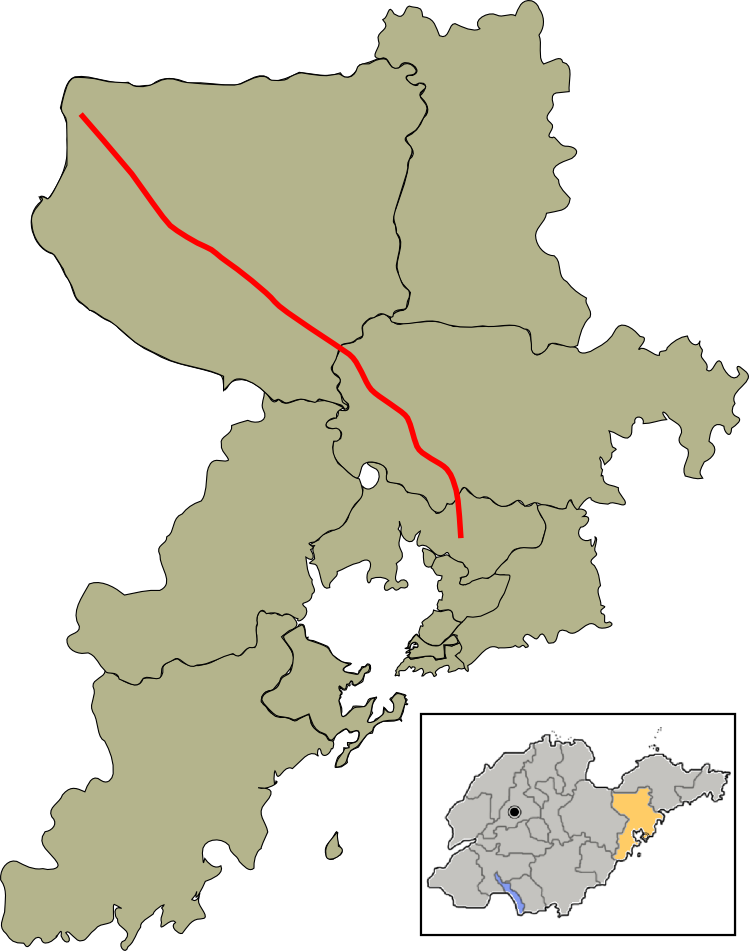
- Route in the sub-provincial city of Qingdao (location in Shandong).

Route information
- Auxiliary route of G20
- Length: 109.08 km (67.78 mi)

Major junctions
- Southeast end: G20 in Chengyang District
- Shandong S24 in Jimo; G15 in Pingdu; Shandong S16 in Pingdu
- Northwest end: G18 / Shandong S21 in Pingdu

Location
- Country: China
- Major cities: Qingdao
- Towns: Jimo, Pingdu

Highway system
- National Trunk Highway System; Primary; Auxiliary; National Highways; Transport in China
← G2004	→ G2012

The G2011 Qingdao–Xinhe Expressway (Chinese: 青岛—新河高速公路), commonly referred to as the Qingxin Expressway (Chinese: 青新高速公路), is a 109.08-kilometre-long Chinese expressway (67.78 mi) located in the sub-provincial city of Qingdao, in the province of Shandong. It is part of China's National Trunk Highway System and connects Chengyang District with the county-level cities of Jimo and Pingdu. It is a spur of G20 Qingdao–Yinchuan Expressway.
