= G0611 Zhangye–Wenchuan Expressway =

Expressway in Gansu, Qinghai and Sichuan provinces of China

Zhangye–Wenchuan Expressway
- 张掖－汶川高速公路

Route information
- Existed: 27 September 2017–present

Major junctions
- North end: Zhangye, Gansu
- South end: Wenchuan County, Sichuan

Gansu section (Zhangye)
- Length: 89.4 km (55.6 mi)
- North end: Zhangye, Gansu
- South end: Biandukou

Qinghai section

Gansu section (Gannan)

Sichuan section
- Length: 380 km (240 mi)
- North end: Langmusi
- South end: Wenchuan County, Sichuan

Location
- Country: China
- Province: Sichuan

Highway system
- National Trunk Highway System; Primary; Auxiliary; National Highways; Transport in China
← G0601	→ G0612

The G0611 Zhangye-Wenchuan Expressway (Chinese: 张汶高速公路) is a partially completed expressway in that connects Zhangye, Gansu and Wenchuan County, Sichuan in China. It passes through Menyuan in Qinghai, Datong, Xining, Ping'an, Tongren, Henan, Erhai, Zoigê, and Songpan.

On 30 April 2020, the section between Datong and Xianmi township opened.

On 27 December 2020, the section between Zhangye and Biandukou (Gansu-Qinghai border) opened.
