= List of Bronze Age sites in China =

This list of Bronze Age sites in China includes sites dated to either the Chinese Bronze Age, or Shang and Western Zhou according to the dynastic system. It is currently based on China's Major Historical and Cultural Site Protected at the National Level record.

== Anhui ==
Site	Chinese name	Period	Designation	Image
Dagongshan–Fenghuangshan copper mine	大工山－凤凰山铜矿	Shang–Song	4-27	
Wannan earth mound tombs	皖南土墩墓群	Zhou	5-164	

== Fujian ==
Site	Chinese name	Period	Designation	Image
Wuyishanya	武夷山崖墓群	Bronze Age	6-253	

== Gansu ==
Site	Chinese name	Period	Designation	Image
Dabaozi	大堡子山遗址及墓群	1000 BC	5-121	
Huoshaogou	火烧沟遗址	Bronze Age	6-206	
Niumendong	牛门洞遗址	Neolithic–Bronze Age	6-203	
Siwa	寺洼遗址	1400–1100 BC	6-204	
Xihetan	西河滩遗址	Neolithic–Bronze Age	6-205	

== Hebei ==
Site	Chinese name	Period	Designation	Image
Dongxianxian	东先贤遗址	Shang	6-9	
Nanyang	南阳遗址	Zhou	6-10	
Taixi	台西遗址	Shang	6-8	

== Henan ==
Site	Chinese name	Period	Designation	Image
Ancient city of Cai State	蔡国故城	Zhou	4-28	
Ancient city of Hua State	滑国故城	Zhou	6-144	
Ancient city of Huang State	黄国故城	Zhou	6-142	
Ancient city of Song State	宋国故城	Zhou	6-140	
Ancient city of Wei State	卫国故城	Zhou	6-141	
Ancient city of Zhi State	轵国故城	Zhou	6-146	
Dashigu	大师姑城址	Bronze Age	6-138	
Erlitou	二里头遗址	1900–1500 BC	3-197	
Fucheng	府城遗址	Shang	5-72	
Goncheng	共城城址	Zhou	6-143	
Guo State Cemetery	虢国墓地	Zhou	4-59	
Huxianggou	尸乡沟商城遗址	Shang	3-199	
Lutaigang	鹿台岗遗址	Neolithic–Zhou	6-134	
Puchengdian	蒲城店遗址	Neolithic–Han	6-137	
Tanghu	唐户遗址	Neolithic–Zhou	6-136	
Xiaoshuangqiao	小双桥遗址	Shang	6-139	
Xinzhai	新砦遗址	Neolithic–Bronze Age	6-135	
Yeyi	叶邑故城	Zhou	6-145	
Yinxu	殷墟	Late Shang	1-142	
Ying State cemetery	应国墓地	Zhou–Han	6-262	
Zhengzhou	郑州商代遗址	Shang	1-141	

== Heilongjiang ==
Site	Chinese name	Period	Designation	Image
Baijinbao	白金宝遗址	900 BC	4-23	

== Hubei ==
Site	Chinese name	Period	Designation	Image
Ancient site of Deng State	邓国故址	Zhou	6-161	
Panlongcheng	盘龙城遗址	1500 BC	3-199 Wrong	
Qingshan	青山墓群	Zhou	6-268	

== Hunan ==
Site	Chinese name	Period	Designation	Image
Tanheli	炭河里遗址	Zhou	6-166	

== Jiangsu ==
Site	Chinese name	Period	Designation	Image
Chuodun	绰墩遗址	Neolithic–Zhou	6-76	
Hongshan	鸿山墓群	Zhou	6-246	
Tianmushan	天目山遗址	Zhou	6-77	

== Jiangxi ==
Site	Chinese name	Period	Designation	Image
Niutou	牛头城址	Shang–Zhou	6-100	
Tongling copper mine	铜岭铜矿遗址	Shang	5-56	
Wucheng	吴城遗址	2nd millennium BC	4-25	

== Jilin ==
Site	Chinese name	Period	Designation	Image
Hanshu	汉书遗址	Early Bronze Age	5-26	
Huifahe shangyou	辉发河上游石棚墓	Middle Bronze Age	6-244	
Xituanshan	西团山遗址	1275–140 BCE	5-27	

== Liaoning ==
Site	Chinese name	Period	Designation	Image
Shipengshan	石棚山石棚	Early Bronze Age	4-58	
Ximu	析木城石棚	Bronze Age	5-155	

== Qinghai ==
Site	Chinese name	Period	Designation	Image
Liuwan	柳湾遗址	Neolithic–Bronze Age	6-211	
Shenna	沈那遗址	Neolithic–Bronze Age	6-212	
Tawentaliha	塔温搭里哈遗址	Bronze Age	5-127	

== Sichuan ==
Site	Chinese name	Period	Designation	Image
Dayangdui	大洋堆遗址	1000–221 BC	6-179	
Jinsha	金沙遗址	1000 BC	6-178	
Sanxingdui	三星堆遗址	1200–1100 BC	3-200	
Shi'erqiao	十二桥遗址	1200–800 BC	5-105	

== Shaanxi ==
Site	Chinese name	Period	Designation	Image
Donglongshan	东龙山遗址	Neolithic–Han	6-194	
Fenghao	丰镐遗址	Zhou	1-143	
Fenghuangshan	凤凰山遗址	Shang–Zhou	6-196	
Laoniupo	老牛坡遗址	Neolithic–Bronze Age	5-114	
Liangdaicun	梁带村遗址	Zhou	6-198	
Lijiaya	李家崖城址	Shang–Zhou	6-197	
Yangjiacun	杨家村遗址	Zhou	6-199	
Zhouyuan	周原遗址	Zhou	2-50	

== Shandong ==
Site	Chinese name	Period	Designation	Image
Ancient city of Lu State, Qufu	曲阜鲁国故城	Zhou	1-445	
Ancient city of Tan State	郯国故城	Zhou–Han	6-119	
Ancient city of Zhu State	邾国故城	Zhou–Han	6-120	
Linzi	临淄齐国故城	Zhou	1-144	
Biyang	偪阳故城	Zhou–Jin	6-121	
Guicheng	归城城址	Zhou	6-118	
Zuiziqian	嘴子前墓群	ZHou	6-256	

== Shanxi ==
Site	Chinese name	Period	Designation	Image
Cuijiawan	崔家河墓群	Zhou	6-230	
Jingjie	旌介遗址	Shang	4-24	
Qucun–Tianma	曲村－天马遗址	Zhou	4-26	
Shangguo and Qiujiazhuang	上郭城址和邱家庄墓群	Zhou–Han	6-22	

== Yunnan ==
Site	Chinese name	Period	Designation	Image
Batatai	八塔台墓群	Zhou–Ming	6-281	

== Zhejiang ==
Site	Chinese name	Period	Designation	Image
Dongyang	东阳土墩墓群	Zhou	6-249	
Fusheng kiln	富盛窑址	Zhou–Warring States	6-88	
Maowanli kiln	茅湾里窑址	Zhou–Warring States	6-87	
Qianshanyang	钱山漾遗址	Neolithic–Zhou	6-86	
Xinan	浙南石棚墓群	Shang	5-161	

== Guangxi ==
Site	Chinese name	Period	Designation	Image
Ganduoyan	感驮岩遗址	Neolithic–Warring States	5-18	

== Inner Mongolia ==
Site	Chinese name	Period	Designation	Image
Chengzishan	城子山遗址	Bronze Age	5-18	
Dadianzi	大甸子遗址	1735–1463 BC	4-22	
Dajing ancient copper mine	大井古铜矿遗址	Bronze Age	5-17	
Jiazishan	架子山遗址群	Bronze Age	5-16	
Hongshan	红山遗址群	4700–2900 BC	6-29	
Xiajiadian	夏家店遗址群	1000–600 BC	6-30	
Yinshan	阴山岩画	Neolithic–Bronze Age	6-818	
Zhukaigou	朱开沟遗址	2000–1400 BC	6-31	

== Xinjiang ==
Site	Chinese name	Period	Designation	Image
Caiwuhu	察吾乎古墓群	Bronze Age	5-190	
Jagunluk	扎滚鲁克古墓群	Bronze Age	5-192	
Loulan	楼兰墓群	Neolithic–Jin	6-289	
Nulasai	奴拉赛铜矿遗址	Bronze Age	5-129	
Qiemurqiek	切木尔切克石人及石棺	Bronze Age	5-191	
Sanhaizi	三海子墓葬及鹿石	800–600 BC	5-188	
Wubao	五堡墓群	Bronze Age	6-390	
Yanbulag	焉不拉克古墓群	Early Bronze Age	5-189	
Yanghai	洋海墓群	Bronze Age–900 CE	6-291	

== Beijing ==
Site	Chinese name	Period	Designation	Image
Liulihe	琉璃河遗址	Zhou	3-201	

== See also ==
- History of China
- History of Manchuria
- List of inventions and discoveries of Neolithic China
- List of Neolithic cultures of China
- List of Palaeolithic sites in China
- Prehistoric Asia
- Prehistoric China
