= Rock Paintings of Wulanchabu =

Pardeep awasthi born (08/10/2003

Petroglyphs of Ulanqab
- Periods: Neolithic Age or even earlier
- Location: Inner Mongolia

Rock Paintings of Wulanchabu or Rock art of Wulanchabu (simplified Chinese: 乌兰察布岩画; traditional Chinese: 烏蘭察布岩畫; pinyin: Wūlánchábù yánhuà), also known as Petroglyphs in the Wulanchabu Grassland, is a historical and cultural site located in Inner Mongolia, People's Republic of China.

== Distribution ==
These rock paintings are distributed throughout the Ulanchabu League, mostly from the Dorbod Banner in the east, to the Urad Middle Banner in the west, and to the Ruogeqige Mountain (若格其格山) in the northeast.

The Rock Paintings of Wulanchabu have a wide range of subjects and rich contents, including beasts, birds, livestock, hunting, grazing, human footprints, dances, animal hoofprints, twelve Chinese zodiac signs, tooth shapes, animal circles, symbols, human face statues, clouds, Sun, coitus, and so on. Animal images in this historical and cultural site account for more than 90% of all rock painting subjects.

== Researches ==
Researches found that the Rock Paintings of Wulanchabu were made successively in the long history of thousands of years, as early as the Neolithic Age or even earlier. Chinese archaeologist Gai Shanlin (盖山林) discovered that these rock paintings were created about 4,000 years ago.
