= G0615 Delingha–Kangding Expressway =

Road in China

Delingha–Kangding Expressway
- 德令哈－康定高速公路
- Dekang Expressway 德康高速公路

Route information
- Auxiliary route of G6

Major junctions
- North end: Qinghai S2013 in Delingha, Haixi Mongol and Tibetan Autonomous Prefecture, Qinghai
- South end: G4217 in Barkam, Ngawa Tibetan and Qiang Autonomous Prefecture, Sichuan

Location
- Country: China

Highway system
- National Trunk Highway System; Primary; Auxiliary; National Highways; Transport in China
← G0613	→ G0616

The G0615 Delingha–Kangding Expressway (Chinese: 德令哈至康定高速公路), also referred to as the Dekang Expressway (Chinese: 德康高速公路), is an under construction expressway in China that connects Delingha, Qinghai to Kangding, Sichuan.

== Route ==
=== Qinghai ===
==== Delingha to Xiangride ====
Referred to as Dehua Expressway, the total length is 176.486 kilometers and passes through Delingha, Ulan County and Dulan County. Construction started in August 2013 and was opened to traffic on 1 October 2016.

==== Xiangride to Huarixia ====
Referred to as Xianghua Expressway, it has a total length of 155.19 kilometers and a total investment of 4.573 billion yuan. It was completed and opened to traffic on 20 October 2016.

==== Huarixia to Jiuzhi ====
Referred to as Huajiu Expressway, the total length is 389 kilometers and passes through Madoi County, Maqên County, Gadê County and Jigzhi County. It was opened to traffic on 13 November 2017.

=== Sichuan ===
==== Jiuzhi to Barkam ====
Referred to as Jiuma Expressway, it has a total length of 224 kilometers, with bridges and tunnels accounting for 40% of the route length. Construction of the Jiuma Expressway started on 25 September 2019. The section from the provincial boundary to Ngawa County was opened to traffic on 31 December 2022, and the remaining sections are expected to be opened to traffic in 2024.

==== Barkam to Kangding ====
Referred to as Liangkang Expressway, this section is still under planning.
