= Wujia River =

- Native name: 乌加河 (Chinese); 五加河 (Chinese)

Location
- Country: People's Republic of China
- Province: Inner Mongolia

The Wujia River (Chinese: 乌加河, 五加河) is a river in the Inner Mongolia of the People's Republic of China, located in the northern part of the river-loop plain in western Inner Mongolia. The ancient Yellow River in the Hetao region is the current Wujia River. According to Commentary on the Water Classic records, the Wujia River that flows north from Bayangol Town (巴彦高勒镇) was originally the main stem of the Yellow River. "Wujia River" means "One End of the River" (河的一端) or "Tip River" (尖河) in Mongolian.

Due to the elevation of the river bed, Wujia River ceased to flow around 1850, and the mainstream of the Yellow River moved south to the current channel. At the end of the Qing Dynasty, after the excavation of the irrigation channel in the Houtao (后套) was completed, Wujia River became a drainage canal. The remaining water was Ulansuhai Nur in the western part of the Urad Front Banner of Bayannaoer League (巴彦淖尔盟). There was a small drainage ditch (i.e. Wangliuzhao) connected with the Yellow River. The Wujia River has now become the main drainage channel of the Hetao Irrigation District.
