= G0613 Xining–Lijiang Expressway =

Road in China

Xining–Lijiang Expressway
- 西宁－丽江高速公路
- Xili Expressway 西丽高速公路

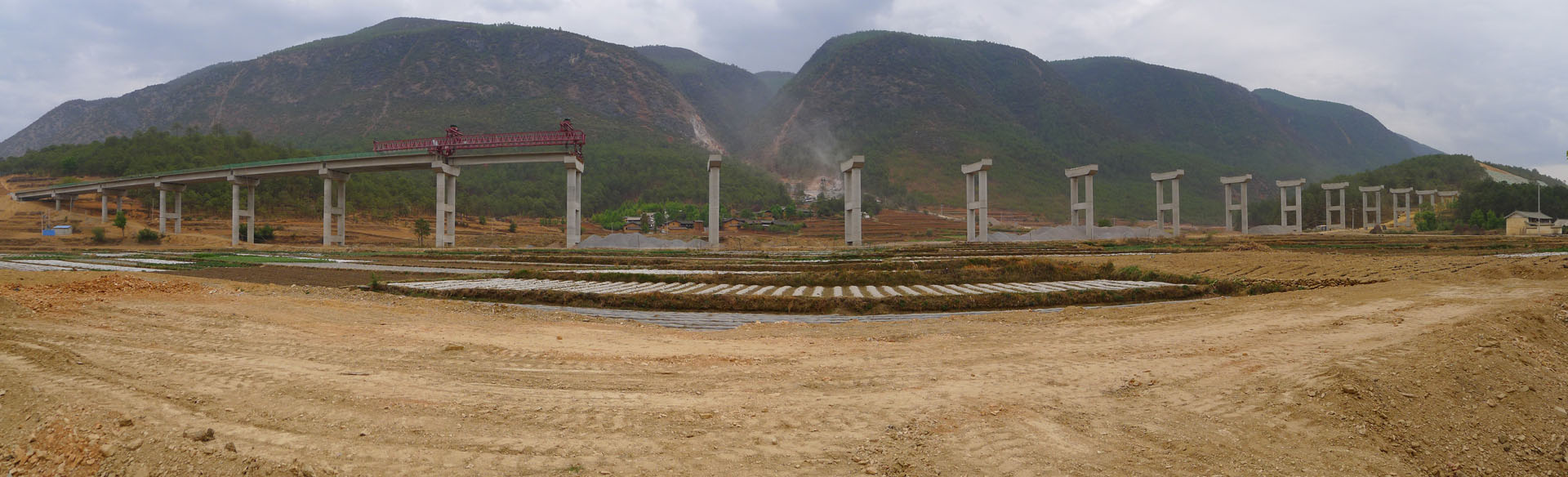
- Shangri-La section under construction

Route information
- Auxiliary route of G6

Major junctions
- North end: G6 in Gonghe County, Hainan Tibetan Autonomous Prefecture, Qinghai
- South end: G5611 in Yulong Naxi Autonomous County, Lijiang, Yunnan

Location
- Country: China

Highway system
- National Trunk Highway System; Primary; Auxiliary; National Highways; Transport in China
← G0612	→ G0615

The G0613 Xining–Lijiang Expressway (Chinese: 西宁—丽江高速公路), also referred to as the Xili Expressway (Chinese: 西丽高速公路), is an under construction expressway in China that connects Xining, Qinghai to Lijiang, Yunnan.

== Route ==
=== Qinghai ===
The section from Xining to Gonghe County runs concurrently with the G6 Beijing–Lhasa Expressway, but is not signposted. The section from Gonghe County to Yushu was completed and opened to traffic on 1 August 2017. The section from Yushu to the Qinghai-Tibet boundary is under planning.

=== Tibet ===
The section from Chamdo to Changdu Bangda Airport is under construction, with the remaining sections currently in long-term planning.

=== Yunnan ===
The section from Shangri-La to Lijiang has been opened, with only long-term planning being done to the north.

== 2021 earthquake ==
On 21 May 2021, a 7.4-magnitude earthquake occurred in Madoi County, Golog Tibetan Autonomous Prefecture, Qinghai, causing the collapse of two sections of Yematan Bridge.

On 6 November 2022, the Yematan Bridge reconstruction project was completed and the section was reopened to traffic.
