= China National Highway 110 =

Road in China

National Highway 110
- 110国道

Route information
- Length: 1,357 km (843 mi)

Major junctions
- From: Beijing
- To: Qingtongxia

Location
- Country: China

Highway system
- National Trunk Highway System; Primary; Auxiliary
← G109	→ G111

China National Highway 110 (G110) runs from Beijing to Qingtongxia, via Hohhot, Baotou in Inner Mongolia, and Yinchuan. It heads northwest from Beijing to Zhangjiakou then heads straight west, and runs to approximately 1,100 kilometers (680 mi).

In October 2004 and November 2004, it was overwhelmed with traffic diverted from the Jingzhang Expressway, occurring as a result of a massive traffic jam on the expressway. In a related incident in August 2010, a 100-km traffic jam occurred on this route.

In 2013, under a new 2013-2030 plan by the National Development and Reform Commission and the Ministry of Transport, the G110 has been extended to Qingtongxia.

== Traffic jams ==
Slow moving traffic and recurrent traffic jams on Highway 110 between Beijing and Inner Mongolia result from an overload of coal trucks transporting coal from newly opened mines in Inner Mongolia to sea ports on the coast of China.

== Route and distance ==
Route and distance

City	Distance (km)
Beijing	0
Changping District, Beijing	32
Yanqing District, Beijing	75
Huailai, Hebei	131
Xiahuayuan, Hebei	156
Xuanhua, Hebei	183
Zhangjiakou, Hebei	218
Wanquan, Hebei	238
Huai'an County, Hebei	269
Xinghe, Inner Mongolia	335
Jining, Inner Mongolia	410
Hohhot, Inner Mongolia	564
Tumd Zuoqi, Inner Mongolia	616
Tumd Youqi, Inner Mongolia	675
Donghe District, Inner Mongolia	721
Baotou, Inner Mongolia	747
Urad Qianqi, Inner Mongolia	858
Wuyuan, Inner Mongolia	922
Linhe, Inner Mongolia	1010
Dengkou, Inner Mongolia	1077
Wuhai, Inner Mongolia	1164
Hainan District, Inner Mongolia	1191
Huinong District, Ningxia	1216
Shizuishan, Ningxia	1266
Yinchuan, Ningxia	1357

== See also ==
- China National Highways
