= G0612 Xining–Hotan Expressway =

Expressway in Qinghai and Xinjiang of China

Xining–Hotan Expressway
- 西宁－和田高速公路

Major junctions
- East end: Xining, Qinghai
- West end: Hotan, Xinjiang

Location
- Country: China
- Province: Sichuan

Highway system
- National Trunk Highway System; Primary; Auxiliary; National Highways; Transport in China
← G0611	→ G0613

The G0612 Xining–Hotan Expressway (Chinese: 西和高速公路) is a partially completed expressway in that connects Xining, the capital of Qinghai, with Hotan, Xinjiang.

The section near Xining forms a southern beltway around the city. Between Xining and Hotan, it will pass along Huangyuan, Ruoqiang, Qiemo, Minfeng and Yutian.
