= G2012 Dingbian–Wuwei Expressway =

Road in China

Dingbian–Wuwei Expressway
- 定边－武威高速公路
- Dingwu Expressway 定武高速公路
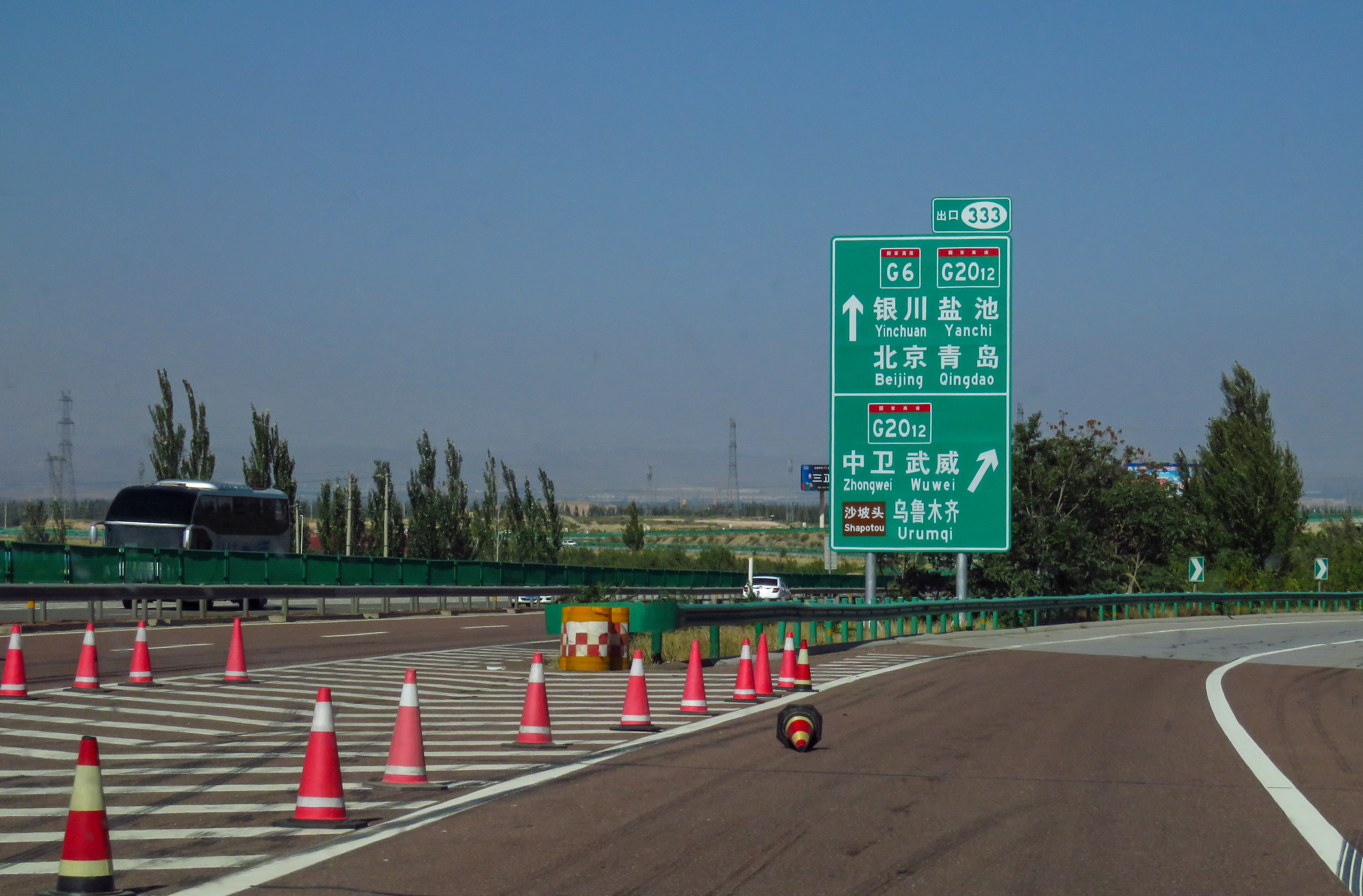

Route information
- Auxiliary route of G20

Major junctions
- East end: G20 in Dingbian County, Yulin, Shaanxi
- West end: Wuwei, Gansu (when complete); Yingpanshui, Shapotou District, Zhongwei, Ningxia (current)

Location
- Country: China

Highway system
- National Trunk Highway System; Primary; Auxiliary; National Highways; Transport in China
← G2011	→ G22

The G2012 Dingbian–Wuwei Expressway (Chinese: 定边—武威高速公路), commonly referred to as the Dingwu Expressway (Chinese: 定武高速公路), is an expressway in China that connects Dingbian County, Yulin, Shaanxi and Wuwei, Gansu. It is a spur of G20 Qingdao–Yinchuan Expressway.

The route is entirely completed.
