= Biandukou =

China mountain pass

- 扁都口
- Location within China
- Elevation: 3,500 metres (11,500 ft)
- Traversed by: G227

Third Approach
- Coordinates: 38°12′37″N 100°56′17″E

Biandukou
- Traditional Chinese: 扁都口
- Simplified Chinese: 扁都口
Transcriptions
Standard Mandarin
- Hanyu Pinyin: Biǎndōukǒu

Biandukou (Chinese: 扁都口; pinyin: Biǎndōukǒu) is a pass with an elevation of over 3,500 m in the Altyn-Tagh, China. It links Minle County of Gansu in the north and Qilian County of Qinghai in the south.

Biandukou has been an important pass in history. It could have been through here that the Chinese Buddhist traveler Faxian arrived in Zhangye, Gansu in the end of the 4th century AD. During the Sui dynasty, it was known as Dadoubagu (Chinese: 大斗拔谷; pinyin: Dàdòubágǔ). Emperor Yang of Sui went to Zhangye in 609 AD through Dadoubagu, where many people died from cold weather.
