= Xianmi =

Xianmi 仙米乡
- Township
- Location within Qinghai
- Coordinates: 37.28611°N 102.00093°E
- Country: China
- Province: Qinghai
- Autonomous prefecture: Haibei
- County: Menuyan

Area
  - Township: 1,462.1 km^{2} (564.5 sq mi)
- Elevation: 2,700 m (8,900 ft)
- Highest elevation: 4,949 m (16,237 ft)
- Lowest elevation: 2,388 m (7,835 ft)

Population (2020)
  - Township: 6,130
  - Rural: 2,146

Xianmi is a township of Menyuan County, Qinghai, China. It has a population of 6,130. The county seat is located in Dazhuang village.

The township is mountainous and the land is mostly undeveloped, with 45% covered by forests. Its economy relies on agriculture and husbandry.

The ancient Tibetan Xianmi Temple (de:Semnyi Monastery), built in 1623, is located in Dazhuang.
