= Dabuzi =

Archaeological site in Gansu, China

- 大堡子山遗址及墓群 (Chinese)
- Location within China
- 34°06′03″N 104°58′37″E
- Periods: Spring and Autumn period
- Location: Li County, Gansu
- Region: gansu

Site notes
- Excavation dates: 25 June 2001

Dabuzi (Chinese: 大堡子山遗址及墓群) is an archaeological site in Li County, Gansu. Musical instruments have been found there.
