= Bayannur =

Bayannur 巴彦淖尔市 • ᠪᠠᠶᠠᠨᠨᠠᠭᠤᠷ ᠬᠣᠲᠠ
- Prefecture-level city
- Bayannur Station

- Location of Bayannur City jurisdiction in Inner Mongolia

- Location of the city centre in Inner Mongolia
- Coordinates (Bayannur municipal government): 40°44′35″N 107°23′13″E
- Country: People's Republic of China
- Region: Inner Mongolia
- Municipal seat: Linhe District

Government
  - CPC Secretary: Nashunmenghe
  - Mayor: He Yonglin

Area
  - Prefecture-level city: 65,788 km^{2} (25,401 sq mi)
  - Urban (2017): 80.51 km^{2} (31.09 sq mi)
  - Districts: 2,354.0 km^{2} (908.9 sq mi)

Population (2010)
  - Prefecture-level city: 1,669,915
  - Density: 25.383/km^{2} (65.742/sq mi)
  - Urban (2017): 385,700
  - Urban density: 4,791/km^{2} (12,410/sq mi)
  - Districts: 608,000

GDP
  - Prefecture-level city: CN¥ 88.7 billion US$ 14.2 billion
  - Per capita: CN¥ 52,987; US$ 8,507
- Time zone: UTC+8 (China Standard)
- Postal code: 015000
- Area code: 0478
- ISO 3166 code: CN-NM-08
- Website: bynr.gov.cn

Bayannur

Chinese name
- Simplified Chinese: 巴彦淖尔
- Traditional Chinese: 巴彥淖爾
Transcriptions
Standard Mandarin
- Hanyu Pinyin: Bāyànnào'ěr
- Wade–Giles: Pa^{1}-yen^{4}-nao^{4}-erh^{3}
- IPA: [pájɛ̂nnâʊàɚ]

Mongolian name
- Mongolian Cyrillic: Баяннуур хот
- Mongolian script: ᠪᠠᠶᠠᠨᠨᠠᠭᠤᠷ ᠬᠣᠲᠠ
Transcriptions
- SASM/GNC: Bayannaɣur qota

Bayannur (Bayan Nur) or Bayannao'er (Chinese: 巴彦淖尔市; pinyin: bāyànnàoěr; Mongolian: Bayannaɣur qota, Mongolian Cyrillic Баяннуур хот) is a prefecture-level city in western Inner Mongolia, People's Republic of China. Until 1 December 2003, the area was called Bayannur League.

Bayannur has an administrative area of 65,788 km^{2} (25,401 sq mi). The name of the city in Mongolian means "Rich Lake". As of the 2010 census, the population of Bayannur was 1,669,915; while the city proper, Linhe District, had 520,300 inhabitants.

The city is served by the Bayannur Tianjitai Airport.

== History ==
The state of Zhao (403 BCE–222 BCE) controlled an area including modern-day Bayannur, while the Western Han dynasty (206 BCE–24 CE) established a hierarchical Chinese administrative structure. The Qing dynasty (1644–1912) designated this area as part of "Inner Mongolia", but after its overthrow by the Republic of China (1912–1949), Bayannur was assigned to Suiyuan Province. Because of Mongol-Chinese cooperation with the Communist faction in the Chinese Civil War (stalled since 1950), Suiyuan was annexed to the new Inner Mongolia Autonomous Region from 1954, although not without controversy because of the province's large and longstanding ethnic Han majority.

== Geography and climate ==
Bayannur is located in the western part of inner Mongolia Autonomous region. Neighbouring prefectures are:

- Baotou (E)
- Alxa (W)
- Ordos (S)

It also borders Mongolia to the north. The whole area of the prefecture is 65,788 km^{2} (25,401 sq mi) at present and the total population is nearly 1.7 million. Bayannur features a desert climate (Köppen BWk), marked by long, cold and very dry winters, very warm, somewhat humid summers, and strong winds, especially in spring. Most of the rain falls between July and September, with very little snow in winter.

Climate data for Bayannur (Linhe District), elevation 1,041 m (3,415 ft), (1991–2020 normals, extremes 1956–2010)
Month	Jan	Feb	Mar	Apr	May	Jun	Jul	Aug	Sep	Oct	Nov	Dec	Year
Record high °C (°F)	12.3 (54.1)	16.9 (62.4)	24.2 (75.6)	33.3 (91.9)	36.6 (97.9)	39.1 (102.4)	39.4 (102.9)	37.9 (100.2)	36.0 (96.8)	29.9 (85.8)	20.2 (68.4)	12.4 (54.3)	39.4 (102.9)
Mean daily maximum °C (°F)	−3.1 (26.4)	2.5 (36.5)	10.0 (50.0)	18.5 (65.3)	24.8 (76.6)	29.4 (84.9)	31.1 (88.0)	28.9 (84.0)	23.8 (74.8)	16.1 (61.0)	6.2 (43.2)	−1.4 (29.5)	15.6 (60.0)
Daily mean °C (°F)	−9.4 (15.1)	−4.7 (23.5)	2.9 (37.2)	11.3 (52.3)	17.8 (64.0)	22.9 (73.2)	24.8 (76.6)	22.5 (72.5)	16.7 (62.1)	8.8 (47.8)	0.2 (32.4)	−7.1 (19.2)	8.9 (48.0)
Mean daily minimum °C (°F)	−14.5 (5.9)	−10.4 (13.3)	−3.1 (26.4)	4.3 (39.7)	10.7 (51.3)	16.2 (61.2)	18.7 (65.7)	16.7 (62.1)	10.7 (51.3)	3.1 (37.6)	−4.3 (24.3)	−11.6 (11.1)	3.0 (37.5)
Record low °C (°F)	−35.3 (−31.5)	−32.4 (−26.3)	−19.1 (−2.4)	−10.3 (13.5)	−3.1 (26.4)	5.5 (41.9)	9.0 (48.2)	5.1 (41.2)	−2.0 (28.4)	−9.6 (14.7)	−20.0 (−4.0)	−27.0 (−16.6)	−35.3 (−31.5)
Average precipitation mm (inches)	0.8 (0.03)	1.3 (0.05)	3.5 (0.14)	4.7 (0.19)	14.4 (0.57)	21.7 (0.85)	28.4 (1.12)	37.6 (1.48)	23.3 (0.92)	6.6 (0.26)	2.5 (0.10)	0.9 (0.04)	145.7 (5.75)
Average precipitation days (≥ 0.1 mm)	1.0	0.8	1.5	1.6	3.7	5.1	7.0	7.0	5.0	1.9	1.0	1.0	36.6
Average snowy days	2.0	1.4	1.3	0.4	0.1	0.0	0.0	0.0	0.0	0.3	1.2	1.7	8.4
Average relative humidity (%)	53	44	37	31	34	41	52	56	54	50	53	52	46
Mean monthly sunshine hours	213.8	218.0	259.0	279.9	313.5	306.6	304.5	291.6	260.3	261.5	217.1	201.7	3,127.5
Percentage possible sunshine	71	72	69	70	70	68	67	69	71	77	74	70	71
Source 1: China Meteorological Administration
Source 2: Weather China

== Demographics ==
In 2000, there were 1,682,662 inhabitants:

Ethnic group	no. of inhabitants	share
Han	1,579,969	93.9%
Mongols	76,368	4.54%
Hui	19,835	1.18%
Manchu	4,231	0.25%
Tujia	560	0.03%
Tibetans	393	0.02%
Miao	224	0.01%
Koreans	211	0.01%
Yi	178	0.01%
Daur	166	0.01%
Other	527	0.03%

At the end of 2004, the population was at around 1.79 million inhabitants.

== Administrative subdivisions ==
Bayannur is divided into one district, two counties and four banners:

Map
Name	Mongolian	Hanzi	Hanyu Pinyin	Population (2010)	Area (km^{2})	Density (/km^{2})
Linhe District	ᠯᠢᠨᠾᠧ ᠲᠣᠭᠣᠷᠢᠭ (Linhė toɣoriɣ)	临河区	Línhé Qū	541,721	2,354	230
Wuyuan County	ᠦᠶᠤᠸᠠᠨ ᠰᠢᠶᠠᠨ (Üyuvan siyan)	五原县	Wǔyuán Xiàn	260,480	2,493	104
Dengkou County	ᠳ᠋ᠧᠩᠺᠧᠦ ᠰᠢᠶᠠᠨ (Dėŋḵėü siyan)	磴口县	Dèngkǒu Xiàn	117,091	4,167	28
Urad Front Banner (Urad Omnod Banner)	ᠤᠷᠠᠳ ᠤᠨ ᠡᠮᠦᠨᠡᠳᠦ ᠬᠣᠰᠢᠭᠤ (Urad-un Emünedü qosiɣu)	乌拉特前旗	Wūlātè Qián Qí	293,269	7,476	39
Urad Middle Banner (Urad Dundad Banner)	ᠤᠷᠠᠳ ᠤᠨ ᠳᠤᠮᠳᠠᠳᠤ ᠬᠣᠰᠢᠭᠤ (Urad-un Dumdadu qosiɣu)	乌拉特中旗	Wūlātè Zhōng Qí	134,204	22,606	6
Urad Rear Banner (Urad Hoit Banner)	ᠤᠷᠠᠳ ᠤᠨ ᠬᠣᠶᠢᠲᠤ ᠬᠣᠰᠢᠭᠤ (Urad-un Qoyitu qosiɣu)	乌拉特后旗	Wūlātè Hòu Qí	65,207	24,925	2
Hanggin Rear Banner (Hanggin Hoit Banner)	ᠬᠠᠩᠭᠢᠨ ᠬᠣᠶᠢᠲᠤ ᠬᠣᠰᠢᠭᠤ (Qaŋɣin Qoyitu qosiɣu)	杭锦后旗	Hángjǐn Hòu Qí	257,943	1,767	145

== Cuisine ==
Located in Hetao Plain, Bayannaoer is the largest agricultural hub in Inner Mongolia. Bayannaoer is famous for "Bameng braised dishes" (巴盟烩菜), meaning "braised dishes".
