= Dengkou County =

Dengkou County 磴口县 · ᠳ᠋ᠧᠩᠺᠧᠦ ᠰᠢᠶᠠᠨ Sanshengkung; Tengkow
- County
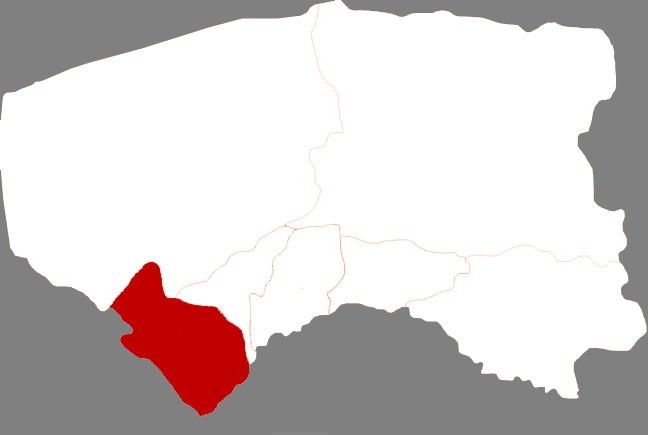
- Dengkou in Bayannur

- Bayannur in Inner Mongolia

- Location in Inner Mongolia Dengkou (China)
- Coordinates (Dengkou County government): 40°19′50″N 107°00′30″E
- Country: China
- Province: Inner Mongolia
- Prefecture-level city: Bayannur
- County seat: Bayangol

Area
  - Total: 3,748 km^{2} (1,447 sq mi)

Population (2020)
  - Total: 90,196
  - Density: 24.07/km^{2} (62.33/sq mi)
- Time zone: UTC+8 (China Standard)
- Website: www.nmgdk.gov.cn

Dengkou County

Chinese name
- Simplified Chinese: 磴口县
- Traditional Chinese: 磴口縣
Transcriptions
Standard Mandarin
- Hanyu Pinyin: Dèngkǒu Xiàn

Mongolian name
- Mongolian Cyrillic: Дөнкоу шянь
- Mongolian script: ᠳ᠋ᠧᠩᠺᠧᠦ ᠰᠢᠶᠠᠨ
Transcriptions
- SASM/GNC: Dėŋḵėü siyan

Dengkou County (Mongolian: ᠳ᠋ᠧᠩᠺᠧᠦ ᠰᠢᠶᠠᠨ; Chinese: 磴口县), is a county with 90,196 inhabitants (2020) under the administration of Baynnur, in the west of Inner Mongolia. The total area of the county is 4,167 km^{2} (1,609 sq mi) with the seat in Bayangol.

== Administrative divisions ==
Dengkou County is made up of 4 towns and 1 sum.

| Name | Simplified Chinese | Hanyu Pinyin | Mongolian (Hudum Script) | Mongolian (Cyrillic) | Administrative division code |
|---|---|---|---|---|---|
Towns
| Bayangol Town | 巴彦高勒镇 | Bāyàngāolè Zhèn | ᠪᠠᠶᠠᠨᠭᠣᠣᠯ ᠪᠠᠯᠭᠠᠰᠤ | Баянгол балгас | 150822100 |
| Longshenghe Town | 隆盛合镇 | Lóngshènghé Zhèn | ᠯᠦᠩ ᠱᠧᠩ ᠾᠧ ᠪᠠᠯᠭᠠᠰᠤ | Лүн шен ге балгас | 150822101 |
| Dukou Town | 渡口镇 | Dùkǒu Zhèn | ᠳ᠋ᠦᠺᠧᠦ ᠪᠠᠯᠭᠠᠰᠤ | Туркев балгас | 150822102 |
| Bulang Nur Town | 补隆淖镇 | Bǔlóngnào Zhèn | ᠪᠤᠯᠤᠩ ᠨᠠᠭᠤᠷ ᠪᠠᠯᠭᠠᠰᠤ | Болон нуур балгас | 150822103 |
Sum
| Xajin Tohoi Sum | 沙金套海苏木 | Shājīntàohǎi Sūmù | ᠱᠠᠵᠢᠨᠲᠣᠬᠣᠢ ᠰᠤᠮᠤ | Шажинтахуй сум | 150822200 |

Others:

- Ulan Buh Farm (乌兰布和农场)
- Bayan Tohoi Farm (巴彦套海农场)
- Hatan Tohoi Farm (哈腾套海农场)
- Bor Tohoi Farm (包尔盖农场)
- Narin Tohoi Farm (纳林套海农场)
- Desert Forestry Experimental Center, Chinese Academy of Forestry (中国林业科学研究院沙漠林业实验中心)

== Climate ==
Climate data for Dengkou, elevation 1,055 m (3,461 ft), (1991–2020 normals, extremes 1981–2010)
| Month | Jan | Feb | Mar | Apr | May | Jun | Jul | Aug | Sep | Oct | Nov | Dec | Year |
|---|---|---|---|---|---|---|---|---|---|---|---|---|---|
| Record high °C (°F) | 9.7 (49.5) | 17.8 (64.0) | 25.3 (77.5) | 33.7 (92.7) | 36.2 (97.2) | 40.3 (104.5) | 39.6 (103.3) | 37.8 (100.0) | 37.0 (98.6) | 28.0 (82.4) | 20.9 (69.6) | 12.2 (54.0) | 40.3 (104.5) |
| Mean daily maximum °C (°F) | −2.4 (27.7) | 3.2 (37.8) | 10.7 (51.3) | 19.1 (66.4) | 25.3 (77.5) | 29.8 (85.6) | 31.6 (88.9) | 29.5 (85.1) | 24.4 (75.9) | 16.7 (62.1) | 7.0 (44.6) | −0.8 (30.6) | 16.2 (61.1) |
| Daily mean °C (°F) | −9.0 (15.8) | −4.2 (24.4) | 3.2 (37.8) | 11.7 (53.1) | 18.4 (65.1) | 23.3 (73.9) | 25.3 (77.5) | 23.1 (73.6) | 17.4 (63.3) | 9.3 (48.7) | 0.6 (33.1) | −6.8 (19.8) | 9.4 (48.8) |
| Mean daily minimum °C (°F) | −14.0 (6.8) | −10.0 (14.0) | −3.0 (26.6) | 4.6 (40.3) | 11.2 (52.2) | 16.4 (61.5) | 19.0 (66.2) | 17.1 (62.8) | 11.3 (52.3) | 3.7 (38.7) | −4.1 (24.6) | −11.3 (11.7) | 3.4 (38.1) |
| Record low °C (°F) | −27.2 (−17.0) | −24.6 (−12.3) | −20.1 (−4.2) | −10.5 (13.1) | −2.4 (27.7) | 4.8 (40.6) | 10.7 (51.3) | 7.5 (45.5) | −1.6 (29.1) | −9.5 (14.9) | −22.3 (−8.1) | −26.8 (−16.2) | −27.2 (−17.0) |
| Average precipitation mm (inches) | 0.7 (0.03) | 1.1 (0.04) | 3.2 (0.13) | 6.1 (0.24) | 13.2 (0.52) | 25.4 (1.00) | 29.8 (1.17) | 36.3 (1.43) | 22.7 (0.89) | 7.5 (0.30) | 2.5 (0.10) | 0.8 (0.03) | 149.3 (5.88) |
| Average precipitation days (≥ 0.1 mm) | 0.8 | 0.8 | 1.5 | 1.6 | 3.6 | 5.3 | 7.0 | 6.2 | 4.3 | 2.0 | 1.3 | 0.8 | 35.2 |
| Average snowy days | 1.3 | 1.3 | 1.2 | 0.3 | 0.1 | 0 | 0 | 0 | 0 | 0.3 | 1.3 | 1.4 | 7.2 |
| Average relative humidity (%) | 53 | 44 | 38 | 31 | 33 | 40 | 50 | 54 | 52 | 48 | 51 | 51 | 45 |
| Mean monthly sunshine hours | 233.6 | 232.4 | 272.3 | 293.1 | 321.8 | 307.7 | 304.8 | 294.1 | 266.7 | 267.1 | 231.7 | 222.4 | 3,247.7 |
| Percentage possible sunshine | 78 | 76 | 73 | 73 | 72 | 69 | 67 | 70 | 73 | 79 | 79 | 77 | 74 |
Source: China Meteorological Administration
