= China National Highway 109 =

Road in China

National Highway 109
- 109国道

Route information
- Part of AH42
- Length: 3,901 km (2,424 mi)

Major junctions
- From: Beijing
- To: Lhasa

Location
- Country: China

Highway system
- National Trunk Highway System; Primary; Auxiliary
← G108	→ G110

China National Highway 109 connects Beijing with Lhasa. It runs westwards from Beijing via Datong, Yinchuan and Xining to Golmud before turning southwest to Lhasa. The portion of the highway from Xining to Lhasa is known as the Qinghai-Tibet Highway. The total length of the route is 3,901 km.

Fushi Road or Jinglan Road forms the stretch of G109 in Beijing, as it begins from Fuchengmen and traverses through Shijingshan. The majority of the Beijing section is in Mentougou District.

The section of the highway within western Qinghai and Tibet, from Golmud to Lhasa, is paralleled by the Qinghai-Tibet Railway. The highway reaches its highest elevation of 5,231 meters (17,162 ft) at Tanggula Pass. Construction of this section started on 11 May 1954.

"Tasked with carrying upwards of 85 per cent of goods in and out of Tibet, the Qinghai-Tibet Highway has been dubbed the "Lifeline of Tibet." ... Since it was opened to traffic in 1954, the central government has spent nearly 3 billion yuan (US$362 million) on three major overhauls. It was asphalted in 1985."

The route also holds importance as one of the main coal transport routes in southern Inner Mongolia.

== Route and distance ==
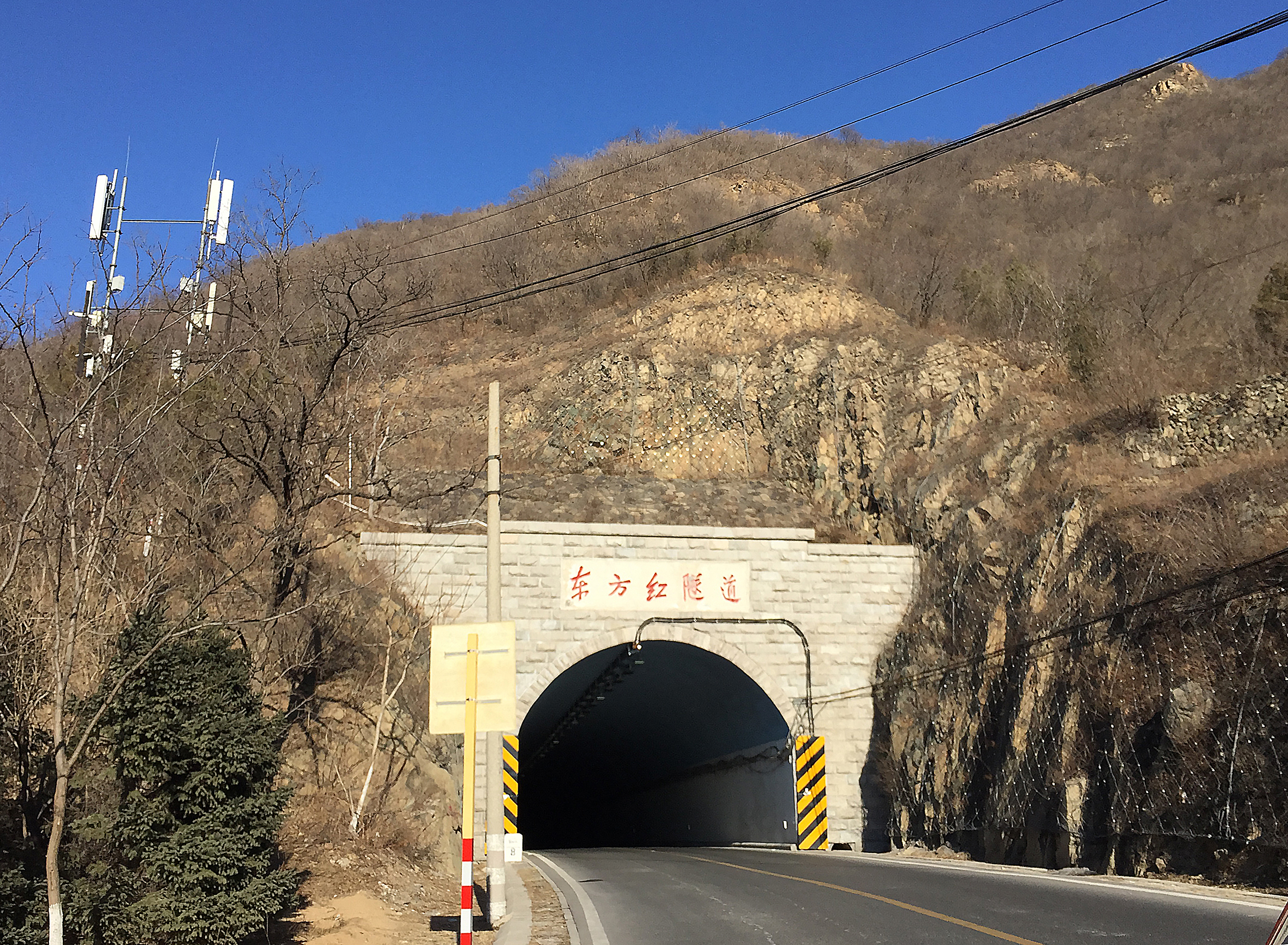
The Dongfanghong Tunnel in Mentougou District, Beijing

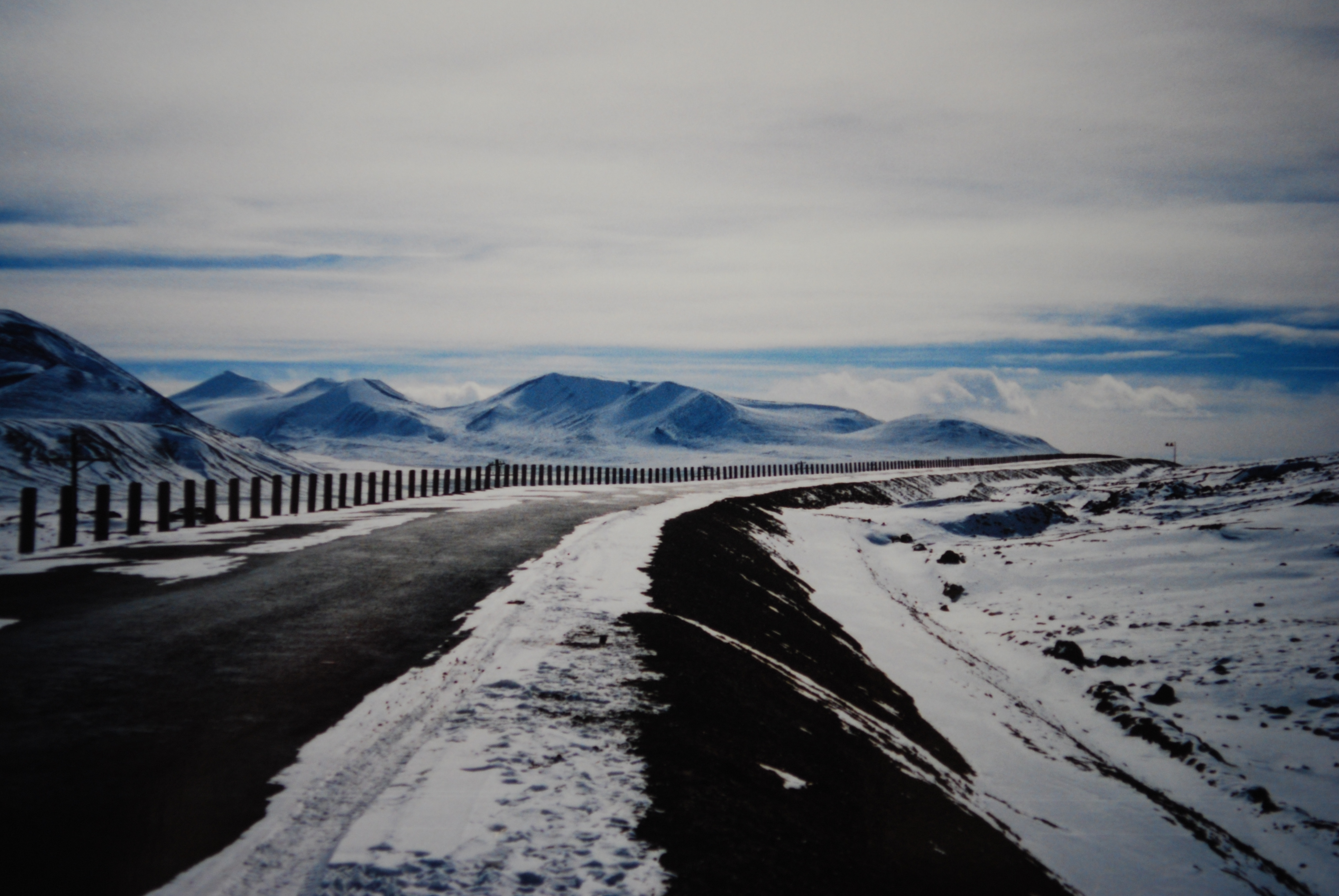
G109 in Qinghai

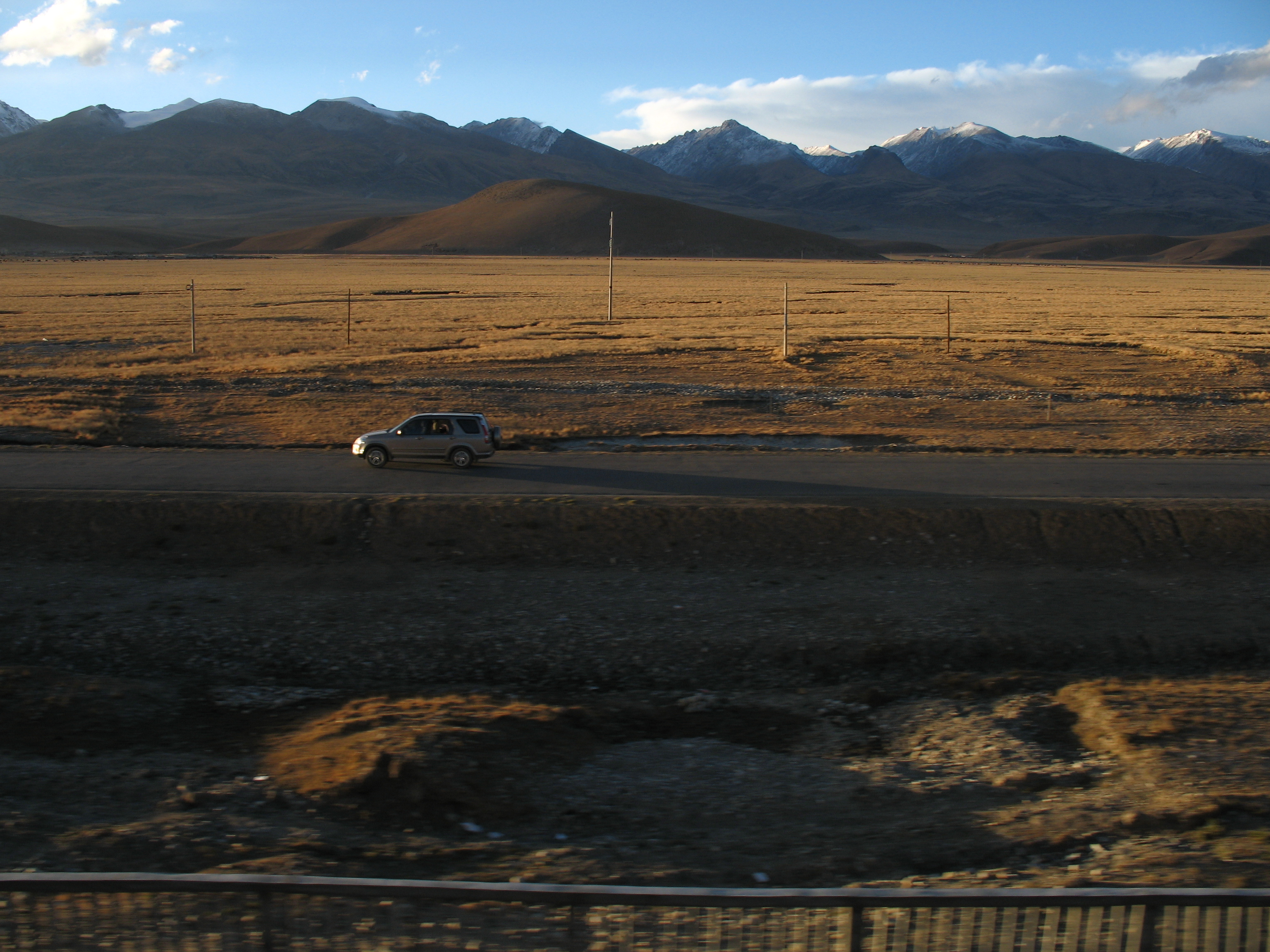
G109 to the north of Lhasa.

Route and distance

City	Distance (km)	Elevation(m)
Beijing	0	100
Yangyuan, Hebei	292	900
Datong, Shanxi	375	1100
Zuoyun, Shanxi	432	1200
Youyu, Shanxi	456	1300
Qingshuihe, Inner Mongolia	567	1100
Dongsheng, Inner Mongolia	794	1300
Shizuishan, Ningxia	1142	1100
Huinong, Ningxia	1157	1100
Pingluo, Ningxia	1187	1100
Helan County, Ningxia	1235	1100
Yinchuan, Ningxia	1249	1100
Yongning County, Ningxia	1269	1100
Qingtongxia, Ningxia	1303	1100
Zhongning, Ningxia	1382	1100
Jingyuan County, Gansu	1597	1300
Baiyin, Gansu	1663	1700
Gaolan, Gansu	1706	1600
Lanzhou, Gansu	1753	1500
Xigu District, Gansu	1782	1500
Minhe, Qinghai	1873	1700
Ledu District, Haidong, Qinghai	1920	1900
Ping'an District, Haidong, Qinghai	1948	2100
Xining, Qinghai	1984	2200
Huangyuan, Qinghai	2033	2600
Dulan, Qinghai	2407	3100
Golmud, Qinghai	2739	2600
Tanggula Pass, Tibet		5231
Amdo, Tibet	3435	4600
Nagqu, Tibet	3575	4400
Damxung, Tibet	3739	4200
Doilungdêqên District, Lhasa, Tibet	3889	3600
Chengguan District, Lhasa, Tibet	3901	3600

== See also ==
- China National Highways
- AH42
