= G20 Qingdao–Yinchuan Expressway =

Road in China

Qingdao–Yinchuan Expressway
- 青岛－银川高速公路
- Qingyin Expressway 青银高速公路

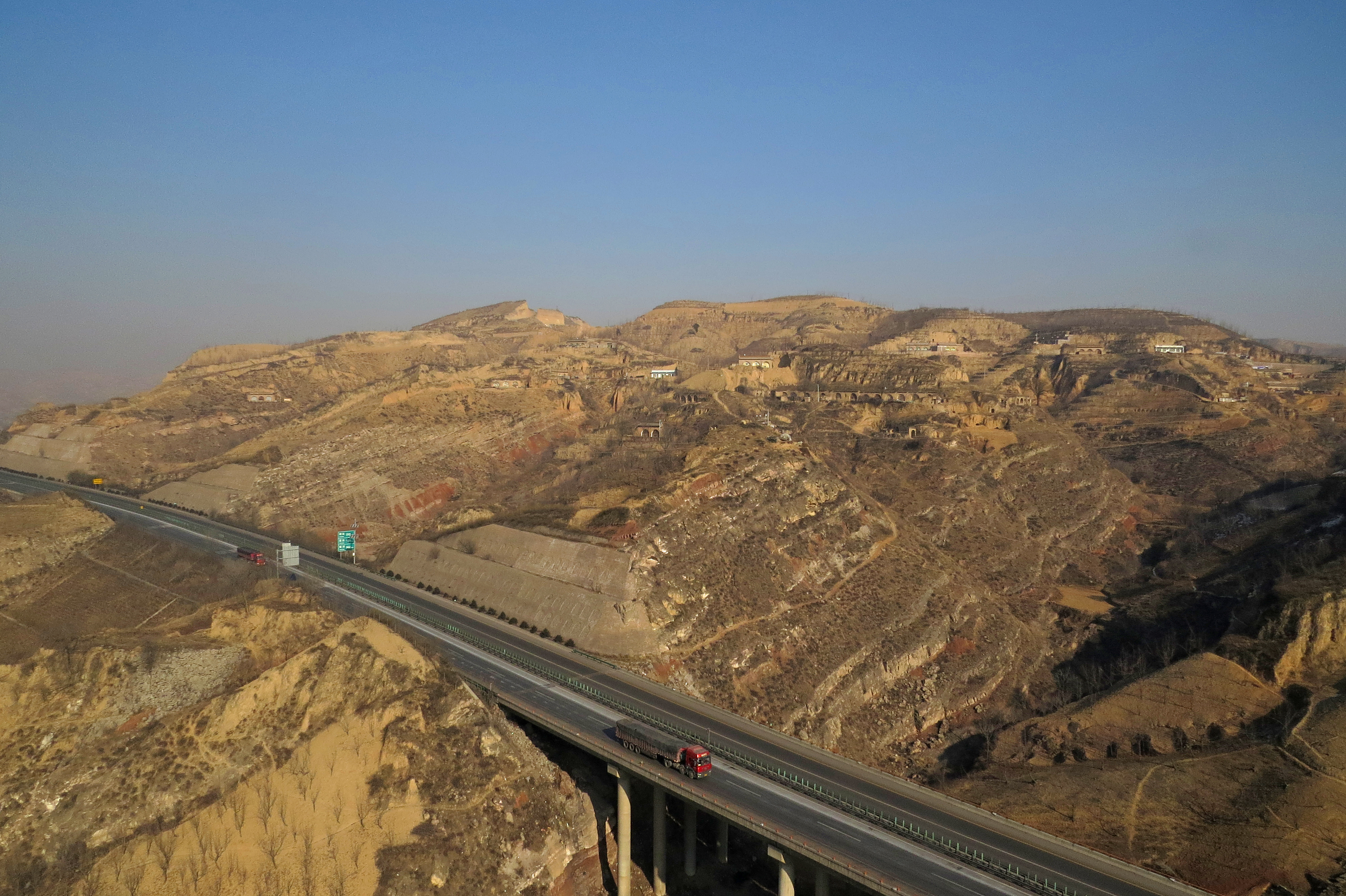
- Qingyin Expressway in Wubu County, Shaanxi

Route information
- Length: 1,600 km (990 mi)

Major junctions
- East end: East Liaoyang Road in Qingdao, Shandong
- West end: G211 in Yinchuan, Ningxia

Location
- Country: China

Highway system
- National Trunk Highway System; Primary; Auxiliary; National Highways; Transport in China
← G1818	→ G2001

The Qingdao–Yinchuan Expressway (Chinese: 青岛—银川高速公路), designated as G20 and commonly referred to as the Qingyin Expressway (Chinese: 青银高速公路) is an expressway that connects the cities of Qingdao, Shandong, China, and Yinchuan, Ningxia. It is 1,600 km (990 mi) in length.

== Route ==
It passes through the following cities:

- Qingdao, Shandong
- Weifang, Shandong
- Zibo, Shandong
- Jinan, Shandong
- Shijiazhuang, Hebei
- Taiyuan, Shanxi
- Lishi District, Lüliang, Shanxi
- Jingbian County and Dingbian County, Yulin, Shaanxi
- Yinchuan, Ningxia
