= Urad Middle Banner =

Urad Middle Banner 乌拉特中旗 • ᠤᠷᠠᠳ ᠤᠨ ᠳᠤᠮᠳᠠᠳᠤ ᠬᠣᠰᠢᠭᠤ
- Banner
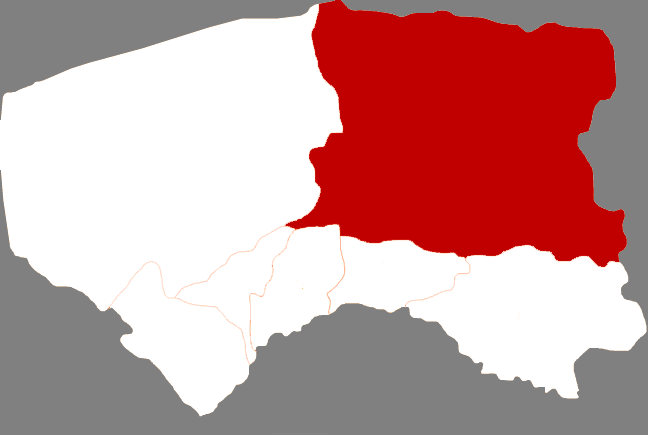
- Urad Middle Banner in Bayannur

- Location in Inner Mongolia Urad Middle (China)
- Coordinates: 41°34′N 108°32′E
- Country: China
- Autonomous region: Inner Mongolia
- Prefecture-level city: Bayannur
- Banner seat: Haliut

Area
  - Total: 22,820 km^{2} (8,810 sq mi)

Population (2020)
  - Total: 112,159
  - Density: 4.915/km^{2} (12.73/sq mi)
- Time zone: UTC+8 (China Standard)
- Website: www.wltzq.gov.cn

Urad Middle Banner

Chinese name
- Simplified Chinese: 乌拉特中旗
- Traditional Chinese: 烏拉特中旗
Transcriptions
Standard Mandarin
- Hanyu Pinyin: Wūlātè Zhōng Qí

Mongolian name
- Mongolian Cyrillic: Урадын дундад хошуу
- Mongolian script: ᠤᠷᠠᠳ ᠤᠨ ᠳᠤᠮᠳᠠᠳᠤ ᠬᠣᠰᠢᠭᠤ
Transcriptions
- SASM/GNC: Urad-un Dumdadu Qosiɣu

Urad Middle Banner (Mongolian: ᠤᠷᠠᠳ ᠤᠨ ᠳᠤᠮᠳᠠᠳᠤ ᠬᠣᠰᠢᠭᠤ; Chinese: 乌拉特中旗) is a banner of Inner Mongolia, China. It is located in the west of the region, and administratively is part of Bayan Nur City. It has a total area of 22,606 square kilometres (8,728 sq mi) and in 2020 had a population of 112,159.

== Demographics ==
The proportion of nationalities in Urad Middle Banner (2020)
Nationality	Percentage
Han	78.6%
Mongols	20.3%
Hui People	0.4%
Manchus	0.4%
Tujia	0.1%
Others	0.2%
Source of the population statistics :

== Administrative divisions ==
Urad Middle Banner is made up of 6 towns, 4 sums, a pasture, and a Breeding Stock Farm. The banner's seat of government is located in Haliut.

Name	Simplified Chinese	Hanyu Pinyin	Mongolian (Hudum Script)	Mongolian (Cyrillic)	Administrative division code
Towns
Haliut Town	海流图镇	Hǎiliútú Zhèn	ᠬᠠᠯᠢᠭᠤᠲᠤ ᠪᠠᠯᠭᠠᠰᠤ	Халиут балгас	150824100
Ujur Gol Town	乌加河镇	Wūjiāhé Zhèn	ᠦᠵᠦᠭᠦᠷ ᠭᠣᠣᠯ ᠪᠠᠯᠭᠠᠰᠤ	Үзүүр гол балгас	150824101
Del Ul Town	德岭山镇	Délǐngshān Zhèn	ᠳᠡᠯ ᠠᠭᠤᠯᠠ ᠪᠠᠯᠭᠠᠰᠤ	Дэл уул балгас	150824102
Xah Gol Town	石哈河镇	Shíhāhé Zhèn	ᠰᠢᠬ᠎ᠠ ᠭᠣᠣᠯ ᠪᠠᠯᠭᠠᠰᠤ	Шах гол балгас	150824103
Ganq Mod Town	甘其毛都镇	Gānqímáodū Zhèn	ᠭᠠᠭᠴᠠᠮᠣᠳᠣ ᠪᠠᠯᠭᠠᠰᠤ	Ганц Мод балгас	150824104
Onggon Town	温更镇	Wēngēng Zhèn	ᠣᠩᠭᠣᠨ ᠪᠠᠯᠭᠠᠰᠤ	Онгон балгас	150824105
Sums
Hulstai Sum	呼勒斯太苏木	Hūlèsītài Sūmù	ᠬᠤᠯᠤᠰᠤᠲᠠᠢ ᠰᠤᠮᠤ	Хулстай сум	150824200
Qongj Sum	川井苏木	Chuānjǐng Sūmù	ᠴᠣᠩᠵᠢ ᠰᠤᠮᠤ	Чонж сум	150824201
Bayan Ulan Sum	巴音乌兰苏木	Bāyīnwūlán Sūmù	ᠪᠠᠶᠠᠨ ᠤᠯᠠᠭᠠᠨ ᠰᠤᠮᠤ	Баян-Улаан сум	150824202
Xinhuree Sum	新忽热苏木	Xīnhūrè Sūmù	ᠰᠢᠨᠡᠬᠦᠷᠢᠶ᠎ᠡ ᠰᠤᠮᠤ	Шинэхүрээ сум	150824203

Others:

- Muyanghai Pasture (牧羊海牧场, ᠮᠤ ᠶᠠᠩ ᠬᠠᠢ ᠮᠠᠯᠵᠢᠯ ᠤᠨ ᠲᠠᠯᠠᠪᠠᠢ)
- Tonghetai Breeding Stock Farm (同和太种畜场, ᠲᠤᠭᠤᠯᠲᠠᠢ ᠡᠭᠦᠯᠳᠡᠷ ᠮᠠᠯ ᠤᠨ ᠲᠠᠯᠠᠪᠠᠢ)

== Climate ==
Urad Middle Banner has a monsoon-influenced, continental semi-arid climate (Köppen BSk), barely avoiding arid designation, with very cold and dry winters, hot, somewhat humid summers, and strong winds, especially in spring. The monthly 24-hour average temperature ranges from −13.3 °C (8.1 °F) in January to 22.9 °C (73.2 °F) in July, with the annual mean at 5.75 °C (42.3 °F). The annual precipitation is 199 mm (7.8 in), with more than half of it falling in July and August alone. With monthly percent possible sunshine ranging from 65% in July to 76% in October, sunshine is abundant year-round, and there are 3,164 hours of bright sunshine annually.

Climate data for Urad Middle Banner, elevation 1,288 m (4,226 ft), (1991–2020 normals, extremes 1951–2010)
Month	Jan	Feb	Mar	Apr	May	Jun	Jul	Aug	Sep	Oct	Nov	Dec	Year
Record high °C (°F)	5.4 (41.7)	13.7 (56.7)	22.0 (71.6)	29.9 (85.8)	33.7 (92.7)	37.2 (99.0)	38.7 (101.7)	35.2 (95.4)	34.0 (93.2)	24.8 (76.6)	15.1 (59.2)	8.0 (46.4)	38.7 (101.7)
Mean daily maximum °C (°F)	−6.1 (21.0)	−0.8 (30.6)	7.1 (44.8)	15.7 (60.3)	22.3 (72.1)	27.3 (81.1)	29.3 (84.7)	27.0 (80.6)	21.4 (70.5)	13.4 (56.1)	3.3 (37.9)	−4.7 (23.5)	12.9 (55.3)
Daily mean °C (°F)	−12.7 (9.1)	−8.0 (17.6)	−0.2 (31.6)	8.7 (47.7)	15.6 (60.1)	21.0 (69.8)	23.3 (73.9)	21.1 (70.0)	14.8 (58.6)	6.2 (43.2)	−3.4 (25.9)	−10.9 (12.4)	6.3 (43.3)
Mean daily minimum °C (°F)	−17.9 (−0.2)	−13.7 (7.3)	−6.4 (20.5)	1.6 (34.9)	8.4 (47.1)	14.3 (57.7)	17.2 (63.0)	15.1 (59.2)	8.6 (47.5)	0.2 (32.4)	−8.3 (17.1)	−15.7 (3.7)	0.3 (32.5)
Record low °C (°F)	−29.1 (−20.4)	−27.5 (−17.5)	−23.5 (−10.3)	−13.3 (8.1)	−5.3 (22.5)	3.7 (38.7)	8.9 (48.0)	5.0 (41.0)	−4.9 (23.2)	−14.3 (6.3)	−24.0 (−11.2)	−28.4 (−19.1)	−29.1 (−20.4)
Average precipitation mm (inches)	1.3 (0.05)	1.9 (0.07)	4.6 (0.18)	5.2 (0.20)	17.9 (0.70)	31.3 (1.23)	51.9 (2.04)	56.6 (2.23)	35.2 (1.39)	7.4 (0.29)	2.9 (0.11)	1.4 (0.06)	217.6 (8.55)
Average precipitation days (≥ 0.1 mm)	1.8	1.8	2.4	2.3	4.6	7.3	8.9	8.5	6.1	2.7	2.1	1.6	50.1
Average snowy days	2.8	3.0	3.2	1.4	0.3	0	0	0	0	1.0	3.0	3.4	18.1
Average relative humidity (%)	59	49	38	30	33	40	50	54	52	50	55	58	47
Mean monthly sunshine hours	208.7	210.7	257.9	276.0	308.6	299.6	302.6	291.7	265.8	256.7	209.0	198.9	3,086.2
Percentage possible sunshine	70	70	69	69	68	66	66	69	72	76	72	70	70
Source: China Meteorological Administration
