= Urad Front Banner =

Urad Front Banner 乌拉特前旗 · ᠤᠷᠠᠳ ᠤᠨ ᠡᠮᠦᠨᠡᠳᠦ ᠬᠣᠰᠢᠭᠤ
- Banner
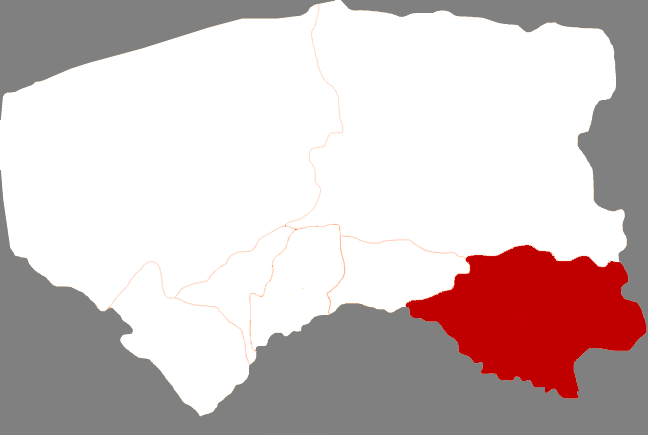
- Urad Front Banner in Bayannur

- Bayannur in Inner Mongolia

- Location in Inner Mongolia Urad Front (China)
- Coordinates: 40°44′13″N 108°39′07″E
- Country: China
- Autonomous region: Inner Mongolia
- Prefecture-level city: Bayannur
- Banner seat: Ulashan

Area
  - Total: 7,460 km^{2} (2,880 sq mi)

Population (2020)
  - Total: 257,826
  - Density: 34.6/km^{2} (89.5/sq mi)
- Time zone: UTC+8 (China Standard)
- Website: www.wltqq.gov.cn

Urad Front Banner

Chinese name
- Simplified Chinese: 乌拉特前旗
- Traditional Chinese: 烏拉特前旗
Transcriptions
Standard Mandarin
- Hanyu Pinyin: Wūlātè Qián Qí

Mongolian name
- Mongolian Cyrillic: Урадын Өмнөд Хошуу
- Mongolian script: ᠤᠷᠠᠳ ᠤᠨ ᠡᠮᠦᠨᠡᠳᠦ ᠬᠣᠰᠢᠭᠤ
Transcriptions
- SASM/GNC: Urad-un Emünedü Qosiɣu

Urad Front Banner (Mongolian: ᠤᠷᠠᠳ ᠤᠨ ᠡᠮᠦᠨᠡᠳᠦ ᠬᠣᠰᠢᠭᠤ; Chinese: 乌拉特前旗) is a banner of Inner Mongolia, China. It is located in the west of the region, situated on the northern (left) bank of the Yellow River, on the Ordos Loop, and in between the cities of Bayan Nur and Baotou. Administratively, it is part of Bayan Nur City, and has a total area of 7,476 square kilometres (2,886 sq mi) and in 2020 had 257,826 inhabitants.

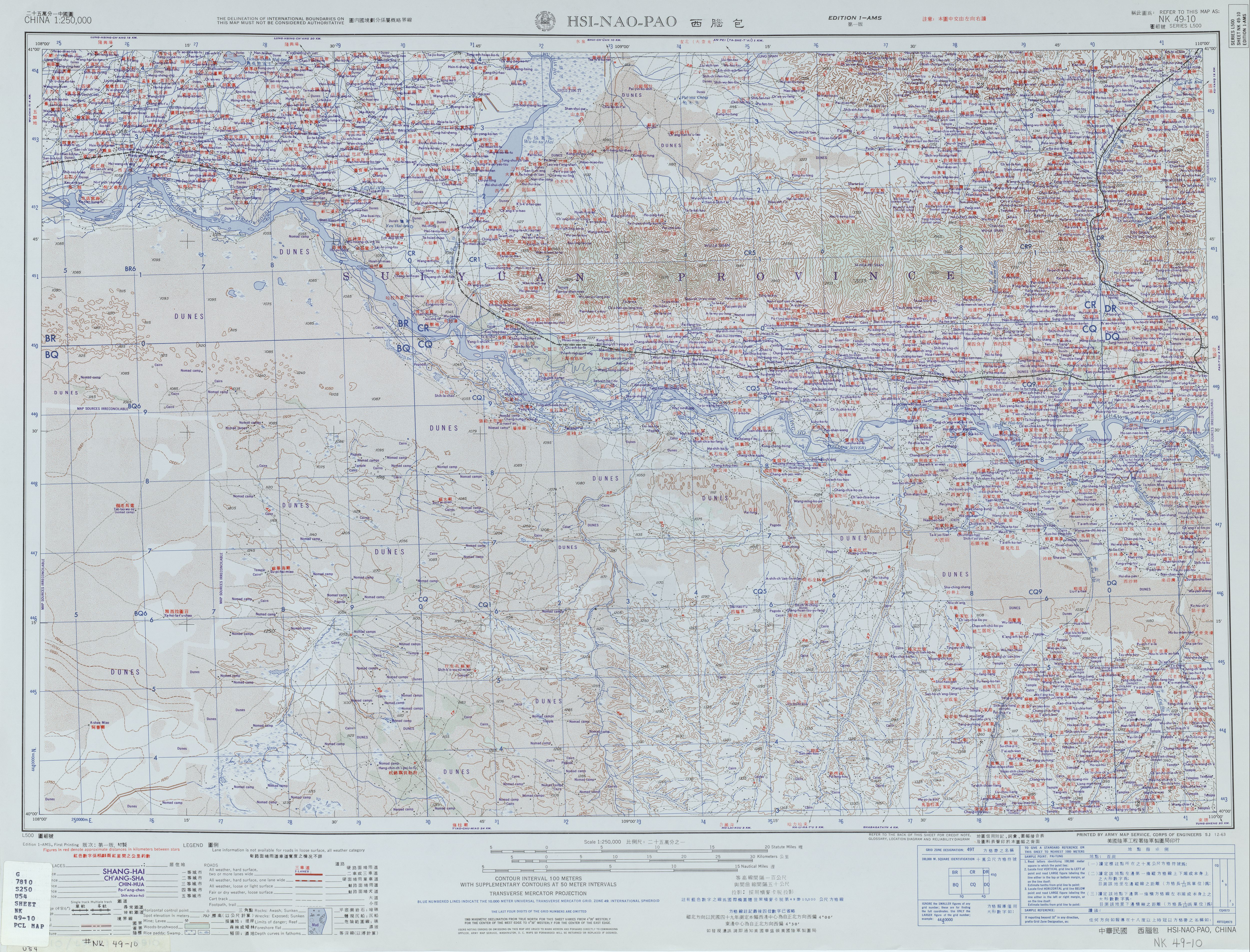
Map including part of modern-day Urad Front Banner (AMS, 1963)

== Demographics ==
The proportion of nationalities in Urad Front Banner (2020)
Nationality	Percentage
Han	94.7%
Mongols	4.4%
Hui People	0.3%
Manchus	0.3%
Tujia	0.1%
Others	0.2%
Source of the population statistics :

== Administrative divisions ==
Urad Front Banner is made up of 9 towns and 2 sums. The banner's seat of government is located in Ulashan.

Name	Simplified Chinese	Hanyu Pinyin	Mongolian (Hudum Script)	Mongolian (Cyrillic)	Administrative division code
Towns
Ulashan Town (Mona-uul, Wulashan)	乌拉山镇	Wūlāshān Zhèn	ᠮᠤᠨᠠ ᠠᠭᠤᠯᠠ ᠪᠠᠯᠭᠠᠰᠤ	Муна уул балгас	150823100
Baiyan Hua Town	白彦花镇	Báiyànhuā Zhèn	ᠪᠠᠶᠠᠨᠬᠤᠸᠠ ᠪᠠᠯᠭᠠᠰᠤ	Баянхуа балгас	150823101
Xianfeng Town	先锋镇	Xiānfēng Zhèn	ᠰᠢᠶᠠᠨ ᠹᠧᠩ ᠪᠠᠯᠭᠠᠰᠤ	Шиан фен балгас	150823102
Xin'an Town	新安镇	Xīn'ān Zhèn	ᠰᠢᠨ ᠠᠨ ᠪᠠᠯᠭᠠᠰᠤ	Шинь-Ань балгас	150823103
Xixiao Ju Town	西小召镇	Xīxiǎozhào Zhèn	ᠰᠢ ᠰᠢᠶᠣᠤ ᠵᠤᠤ ᠪᠠᠯᠭᠠᠰᠤ	Ший шяо жуу балгас	150823104
Ih Xigtei Town (Dashetai, Tashetai)	大佘太镇	Dàshétài Zhèn	ᠶᠡᠬᠡ ᠰᠢᠭᠡᠲᠡᠢ ᠪᠠᠯᠭᠠᠰᠤ	Их шээтэй балгас	150823105
Minggan Town	明安镇	Míng'ān Zhèn	ᠮᠢᠩᠭᠠᠨ ᠪᠠᠯᠭᠠᠰᠤ	Мянган балгас	150823106
Bag Xigtei Town	小佘太镇	Xiǎoshétài Zhèn	ᠪᠠᠭ᠎ᠠ ᠰᠢᠭᠡᠲᠡᠢ ᠪᠠᠯᠭᠠᠰᠤ	Бага шээтэй балгас	150823107
Sudalin Hudag Town	苏独仑镇	Sūdúlún Zhèn	ᠰᠤᠳᠠᠯ ᠤᠨ ᠬᠤᠳᠳᠤᠭ ᠪᠠᠯᠭᠠᠰᠤ	Судлын худаг балгас	150823108
Sums
Erden Bulag Sum	额尔登布拉格苏木	É'ěrdēngbùlāgé Sūmù	ᠡᠷᠳᠡᠨᠢᠪᠤᠯᠠᠭ ᠰᠤᠮᠤ	Эрдэнэбулаг сум	150823200
Sadag Sum	沙德格苏木	Shādégé Sūmù	ᠰᠠᠭᠠᠳᠠᠭ ᠰᠤᠮᠤ	Саадаг сум	150823201
Others
Bayannur Zhongtan Farm	巴彦淖尔市中滩农场	Bāyànnào’ěr Shì Zhōngtān Nóngchǎng	ᠵᠦᠩ ᠲᠠᠨ ᠲᠠᠷᠢᠶᠠᠯᠠᠩ ᠤᠨ ᠲᠠᠯᠠᠪᠠᠢ	Жүн дан тариалангийн талбай	150823400
Bayannur Xishanzui Farm	巴彦淖尔市西山嘴农场	Bāyànnào’ěr Shì Xīshānzuǐ Nóngchǎng	ᠰᠢ ᠱᠠᠨ ᠽᠦᠢ ᠲᠠᠷᠢᠶᠠᠯᠠᠩ ᠤᠨ ᠲᠠᠯᠠᠪᠠᠢ	Ший шин жуу тариалангийн талбай	150823401
Bayannur Xin'an Farm	巴彦淖尔市新安农场	Bāyànnào’ěr Shì Xīn’ān Nóngchǎng	ᠰᠢᠨ ᠠᠨ ᠲᠠᠷᠢᠶᠠᠯᠠᠩ ᠤᠨ ᠲᠠᠯᠠᠪᠠᠢ	Шин аан тариалангийн талбай	150823402
Bayannur Sudalin Hudag Farm	巴彦淖尔市苏独隆农场	Bāyànnào’ěr Shì Sūdúlún Nóngchǎng	ᠰᠤᠳᠠᠯ ᠤᠨ ᠬᠤᠳᠳᠤᠭ ᠲᠠᠷᠢᠶᠠᠯᠠᠩ ᠤᠨ ᠲᠠᠯᠠᠪᠠᠢ	Судлын худаг тариалангийн талбай	150823403
Bayannur Ih Xigtei Ranch	巴彦淖尔市大佘太牧场	Bāyànnào’ěr Shì Dàshétài Mùchǎng	ᠶᠡᠬᠡ ᠰᠢᠭᠡᠲᠡᠢ ᠮᠠᠯᠵᠢᠯ ᠤᠨ ᠲᠠᠯᠠᠪᠠᠢ	Их шээтэй малжлын талбай	150823404
Bayannur Uliastai Nur Fishery Farm	巴彦淖尔市乌梁素海渔场	Bāyànnào’ěr Shì Wūliángsùhǎi Yúchǎng	ᠤᠯᠢᠶᠠᠰᠤᠲᠠᠢ ᠨᠠᠭᠤᠷ ᠵᠢᠭᠠᠰᠤᠨ ᠲᠠᠯᠠᠪᠠᠢ	Улиастай нуур загасан талбай	150823405

== Climate ==
Climate data for Urad Front Banner, elevation 1,021 m (3,350 ft), (1991–2020 normals, extremes 1981–present)
Month	Jan	Feb	Mar	Apr	May	Jun	Jul	Aug	Sep	Oct	Nov	Dec	Year
Record high °C (°F)	7.1 (44.8)	17.7 (63.9)	23.9 (75.0)	32.9 (91.2)	36.0 (96.8)	39.7 (103.5)	40.1 (104.2)	36.5 (97.7)	36.0 (96.8)	27.8 (82.0)	20.9 (69.6)	10.7 (51.3)	40.1 (104.2)
Mean daily maximum °C (°F)	−3.8 (25.2)	1.7 (35.1)	10.5 (50.9)	19.0 (66.2)	25.4 (77.7)	29.8 (85.6)	31.7 (89.1)	29.3 (84.7)	23.9 (75.0)	16.7 (62.1)	6.5 (43.7)	−2.0 (28.4)	15.7 (60.3)
Daily mean °C (°F)	−9.6 (14.7)	−4.9 (23.2)	3.5 (38.3)	12.2 (54.0)	18.7 (65.7)	23.6 (74.5)	25.8 (78.4)	23.5 (74.3)	17.7 (63.9)	9.9 (49.8)	0.9 (33.6)	−7.2 (19.0)	9.5 (49.1)
Mean daily minimum °C (°F)	−14.2 (6.4)	−10.1 (13.8)	−2.1 (28.2)	5.9 (42.6)	12.3 (54.1)	17.6 (63.7)	20.3 (68.5)	18.6 (65.5)	12.6 (54.7)	4.8 (40.6)	−3.2 (26.2)	−11.4 (11.5)	4.3 (39.7)
Record low °C (°F)	−30.5 (−22.9)	−27.8 (−18.0)	−22.3 (−8.1)	−9.5 (14.9)	−3.3 (26.1)	4.1 (39.4)	10.5 (50.9)	7.6 (45.7)	−1.3 (29.7)	−9.7 (14.5)	−21.6 (−6.9)	−26.1 (−15.0)	−30.5 (−22.9)
Average precipitation mm (inches)	1.2 (0.05)	2.4 (0.09)	5.0 (0.20)	6.2 (0.24)	19.2 (0.76)	25.5 (1.00)	57.9 (2.28)	53.8 (2.12)	37.4 (1.47)	10.1 (0.40)	4.3 (0.17)	1.2 (0.05)	224.2 (8.83)
Average precipitation days (≥ 0.1 mm)	1.4	1.5	2.6	2.2	4.6	6.2	9.0	7.8	5.9	3.0	1.7	1.6	47.5
Average snowy days	2.6	2.2	1.9	0.7	0.1	0	0	0	0	0.4	1.6	2.5	12
Average relative humidity (%)	54	46	39	33	34	41	52	56	54	51	53	53	47
Mean monthly sunshine hours	220.3	224.8	264.9	287.5	316.7	307.2	305.3	292.6	259.8	260.7	220.5	206.3	3,166.6
Percentage possible sunshine	74	74	71	72	70	68	67	69	71	77	75	72	72
Source: China Meteorological Administrationall-time extreme

Climate data for Dashetai Town, Urad Front Banner, elevation 1,079 m (3,540 ft), (1991–2020 normals)
Month	Jan	Feb	Mar	Apr	May	Jun	Jul	Aug	Sep	Oct	Nov	Dec	Year
Mean daily maximum °C (°F)	−3.8 (25.2)	1.6 (34.9)	9.3 (48.7)	17.9 (64.2)	24.4 (75.9)	29.1 (84.4)	30.9 (87.6)	28.9 (84.0)	23.6 (74.5)	15.7 (60.3)	5.7 (42.3)	−2.3 (27.9)	15.1 (59.2)
Daily mean °C (°F)	−11.7 (10.9)	−6.5 (20.3)	1.6 (34.9)	10.5 (50.9)	17.4 (63.3)	22.6 (72.7)	24.6 (76.3)	22.5 (72.5)	16.4 (61.5)	7.9 (46.2)	−1.6 (29.1)	−9.5 (14.9)	7.9 (46.1)
Mean daily minimum °C (°F)	−17.5 (0.5)	−12.6 (9.3)	−4.9 (23.2)	3.0 (37.4)	9.9 (49.8)	15.4 (59.7)	18.0 (64.4)	16.3 (61.3)	10.0 (50.0)	1.6 (34.9)	−6.9 (19.6)	−14.6 (5.7)	1.5 (34.7)
Average precipitation mm (inches)	1.7 (0.07)	2.7 (0.11)	5.2 (0.20)	7.7 (0.30)	22.0 (0.87)	29.7 (1.17)	57.1 (2.25)	52.0 (2.05)	36.6 (1.44)	12.1 (0.48)	4.8 (0.19)	1.8 (0.07)	233.4 (9.2)
Average precipitation days (≥ 0.1 mm)	2.1	2.0	2.6	2.7	5.2	6.6	9.3	8.1	6.3	3.5	2.2	1.9	52.5
Average snowy days	2.6	2.3	1.9	0.7	0.1	0	0	0	0	0.5	2.0	2.4	12.5
Average relative humidity (%)	55	46	38	30	33	41	52	55	52	50	54	56	47
Mean monthly sunshine hours	231.4	234.9	282.4	301.3	333.7	324.4	320.3	310.3	276.6	269.9	229.4	216.9	3,331.5
Percentage possible sunshine	77	77	76	75	74	72	70	74	75	80	78	76	75
Source: China Meteorological Administration
