= 延壽 =

延壽 or 延寿 may refer to:

- Yanshou, Heilongjiang, China
- Yanshou, Beijing, China
- Yeonsu (연수), Incheon, South Korea
- Yongming Yanshou (永明延壽; 904–976), prominent Buddhist monk in Five Dynasties

== See also ==
- The dictionary definition of 延 at Wiktionary
- The dictionary definition of 壽 at Wiktionary
- The dictionary definition of 寿 at Wiktionary
