= Chengnan Subdistrict, Beijing =

Chengnan Subdistrict 城南街道
- Subdistrict
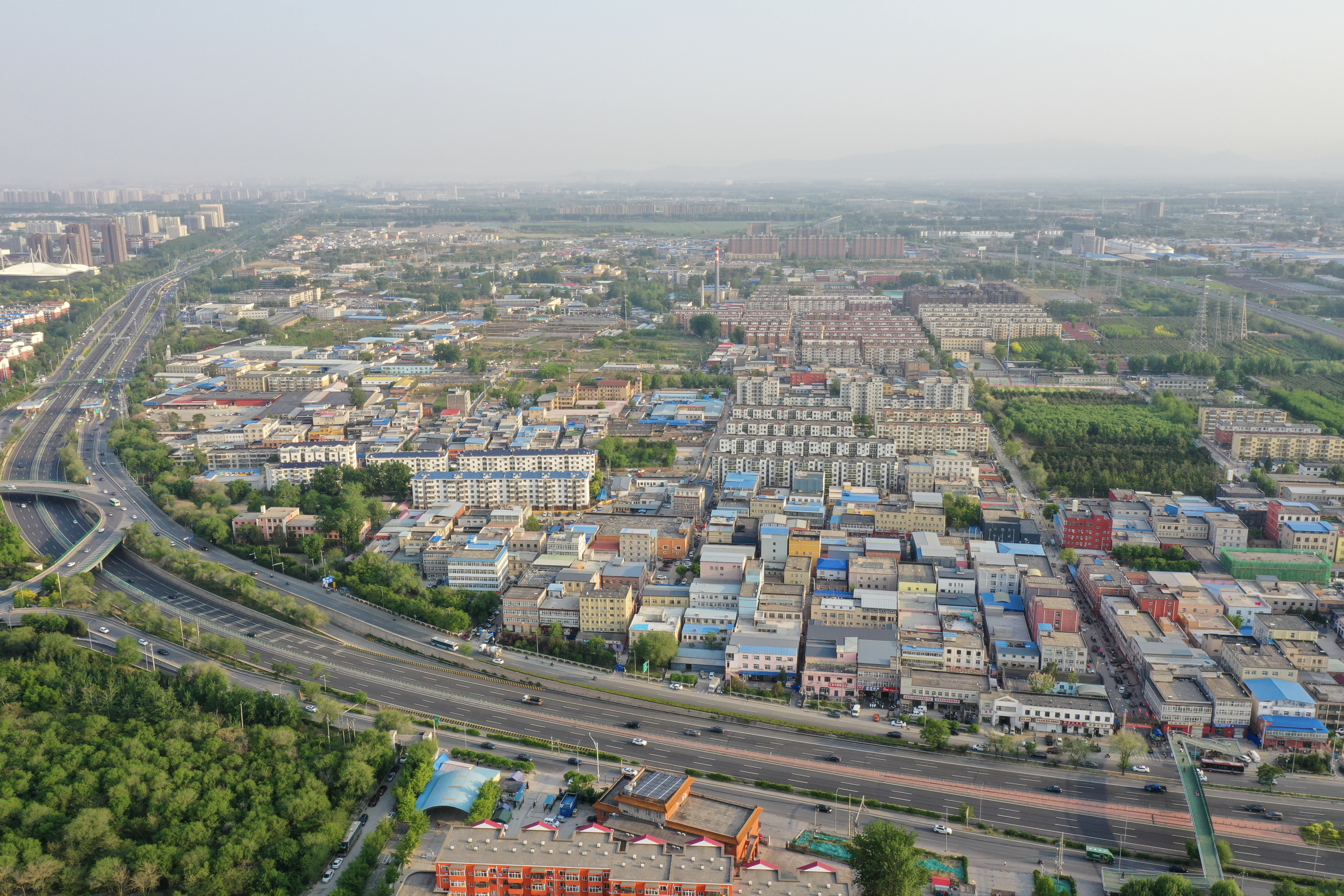
- Aerial view of Haozhuang inside of Chengnan Subdistrict, 2022

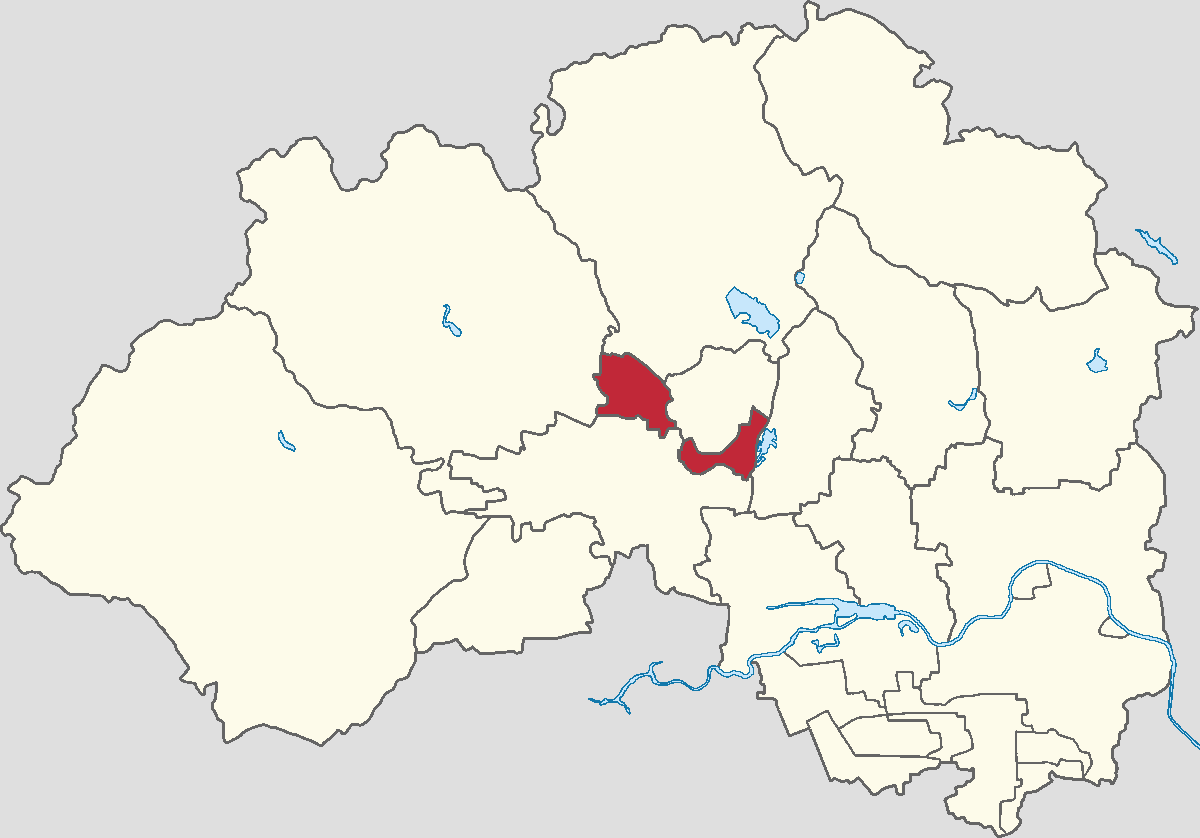
- Location of Chengnan Subdistrict within Changping District

- Location within Beijing Location within China
- Coordinates: 40°12′41″N 116°14′55″E
- Country: China
- Municipality: Beijing
- District: Changping
- Village-level Divisions: 16 communities 5 villages

Area
  - Total: 14.8 km^{2} (5.7 sq mi)
- Elevation: 61 m (200 ft)

Population (2020)
  - Total: 88,963
  - Density: 6,010/km^{2} (15,600/sq mi)
- Time zone: UTC+8 (China Standard)
- Postal code: 102200
- Area code: 010

Chengnan Subdistrict (Chinese: 城南街道; pinyin: Chéngnán Jiēdào) is a subdistrict in the center of Changping District, Beijing, China. It shares border with Chengbei Subdistrict to its north, Nanshao Town to its east, Machikou Area to its south and west, and has an exclave west of Chengbei Subdistrict. It had a census population of 88,963 in 2020.

The name Chengnan (Chinese: 城南; lit. 'City South') originates from the subdistrict's location south of a once-existed city gate of Changping.

== History ==
Timeline of Chengnan Subdistrict
Year	Status	Part of
1949–1958	Changping Town	Changping County
1958–1979	Parts of following communes: Shisanling; Chengguan; Changpingzhen	Changping County
1979–1982	Chengguan People's Commune Changpingzhen People's Commune	Changping County
1982–1986	Chengguan Township Changping Town	Changping County
1986–1990	Changping Town	Changping County
1990–1999	Changping Town Chengqu Town	Changping County
1999–2003	Changping Town Chengqu Town	Changping District
2003–present	Chengnan Subdistrict	Changping District

== Administrative divisions ==
As of 2021, 21 subdivisions constituted Chengnan Subdistrict, of which 16 were communities, and 5 were villages:

Administrative division code	Subdivision names	Name transliteration	Type
110114005001	龙凤山砂石厂	Longfengshan Shashichang	Community
110114005002	凉水河	Liangshuihe	Community
110114005003	化庄	Huazhuang	Community
110114005004	山峡	Shanxia	Community
110114005005	昌盛园	Changshengyuan	Community
110114005006	郝庄家园北区	Hezhuang Jiayuan Beiqu	Community
110114005007	拓然家苑	Tuoran Jiayuan	Community
110114005008	水屯家园	Shuitun Jiayuan	Community
110114005009	秋实家园	Qiushi Jiayuan	Community
110114005010	新汇园	Xinhuiyuan	Community
110114005011	畅春阁	Changchunge	Community
110114005012	郝庄家园西区	Hezhuang Jiayuan Xiqu	Community
110114005013	世涛天朗	Shitao Tianlang	Community
110114005014	富泉花园	Fuquan Huayuan	Community
110114005015	介山	Jieshan	Community
110114005016	龙山锦园	Longshan Jinyuan	Community
110114005205	水屯	Shuitun	Village
110114005206	南郝庄	Nan Hezhuang	Village
110114005207	旧县	Jiuxian	Village
110114005208	北郝庄	Bei Hezhuang	Village
110114005209	邓庄	Dengzhuang	Village

== Gallery ==
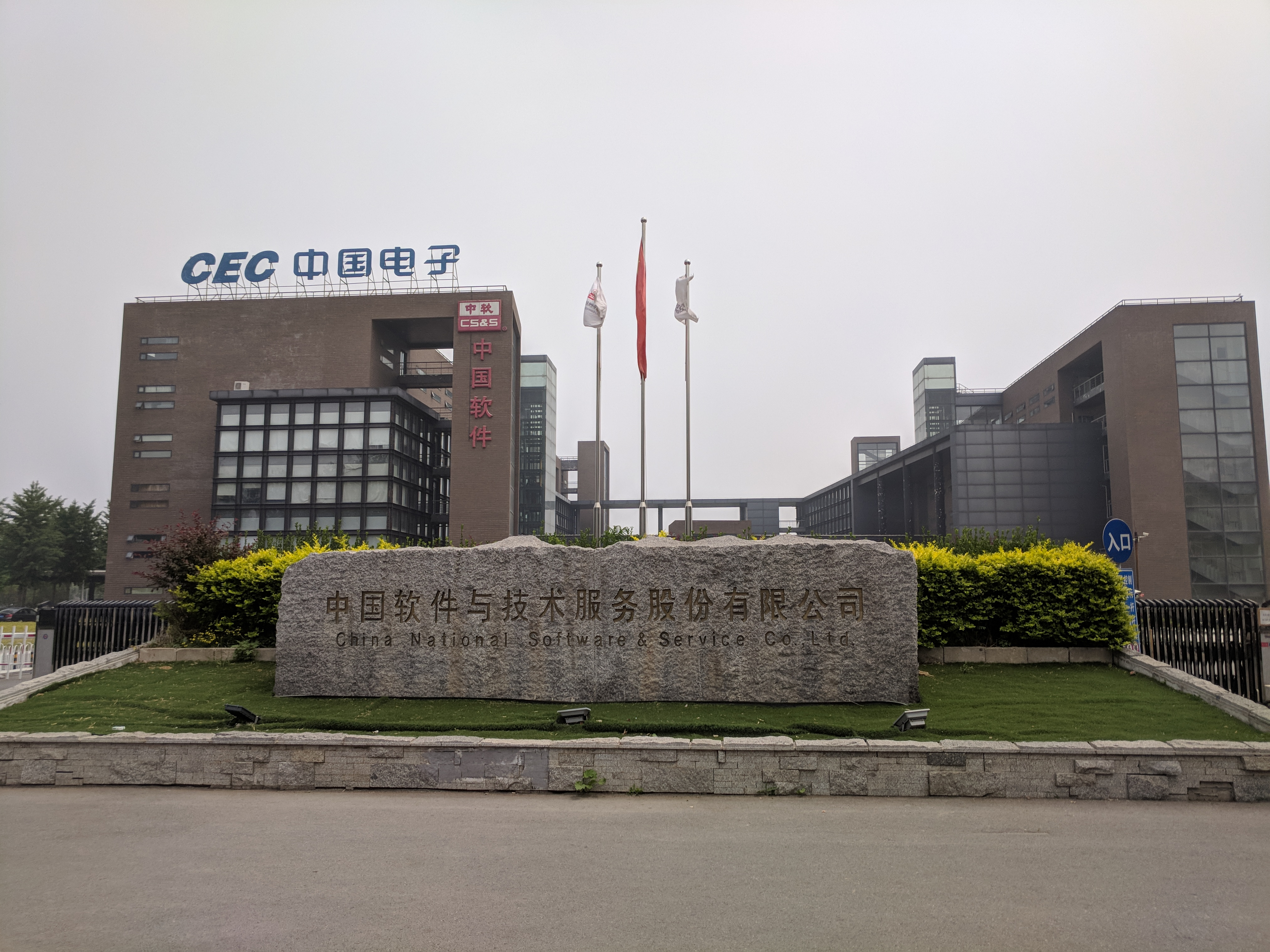
China National Software & Service Co., Ltd., 2019

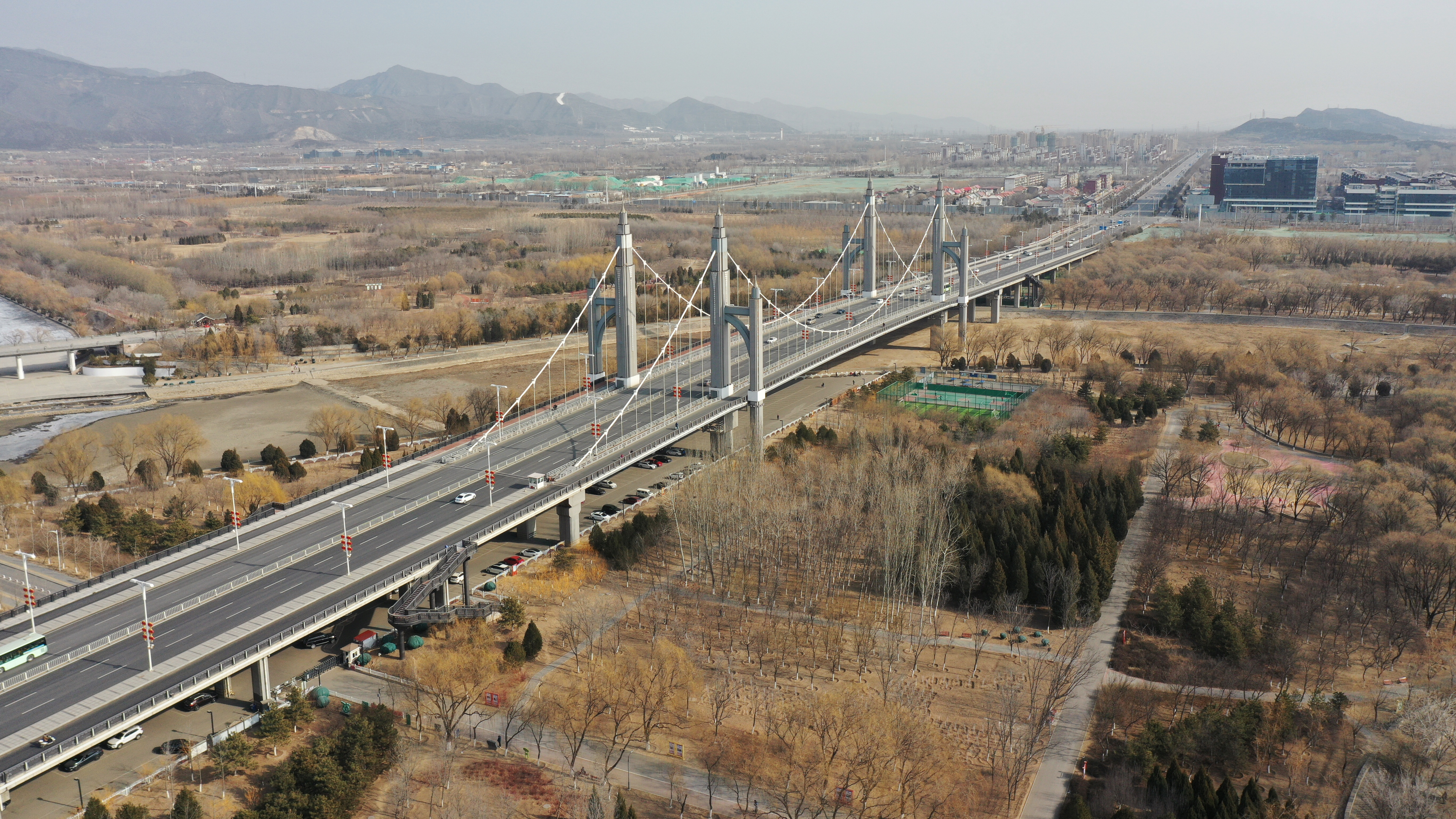
Nanhuan Road Bridge in the east of the subdistrict, 2021

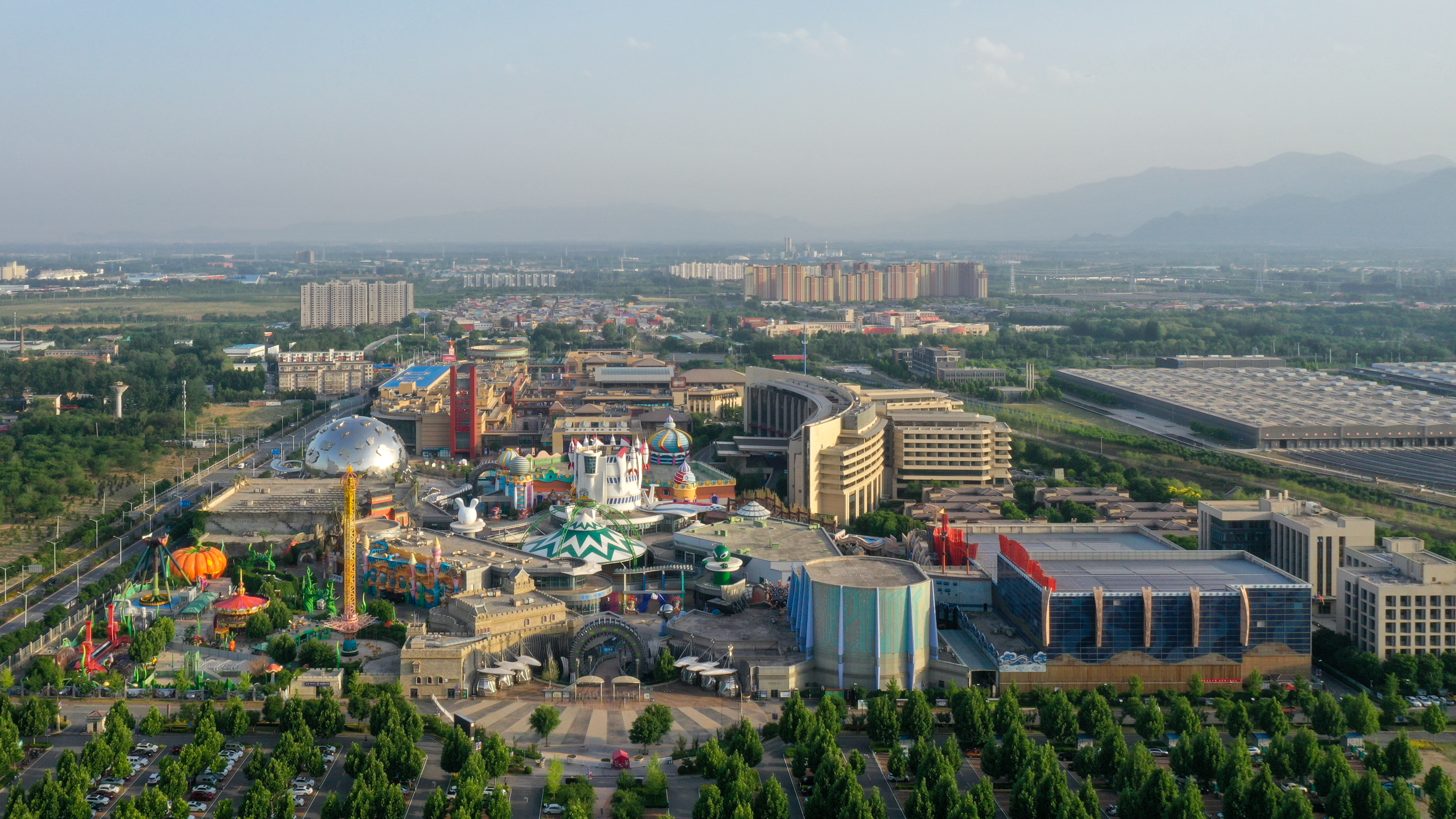
Leduo Holiday Plaza, 2022

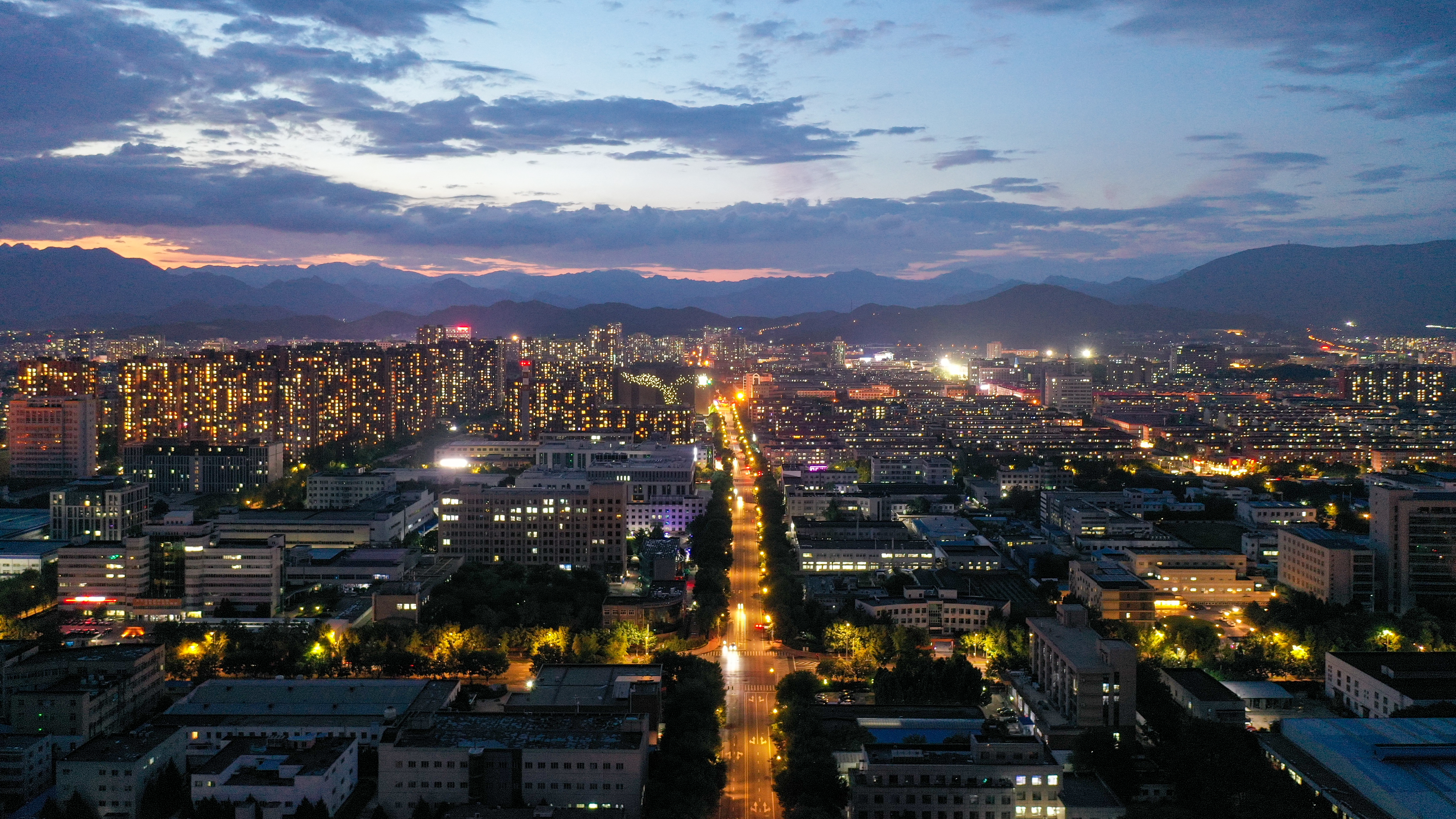
Night-view of the subdistrict, 2022

== See also ==
- List of township-level divisions of Beijing
