= Baishan, Beijing =

Baishan Town 百善镇
- Town
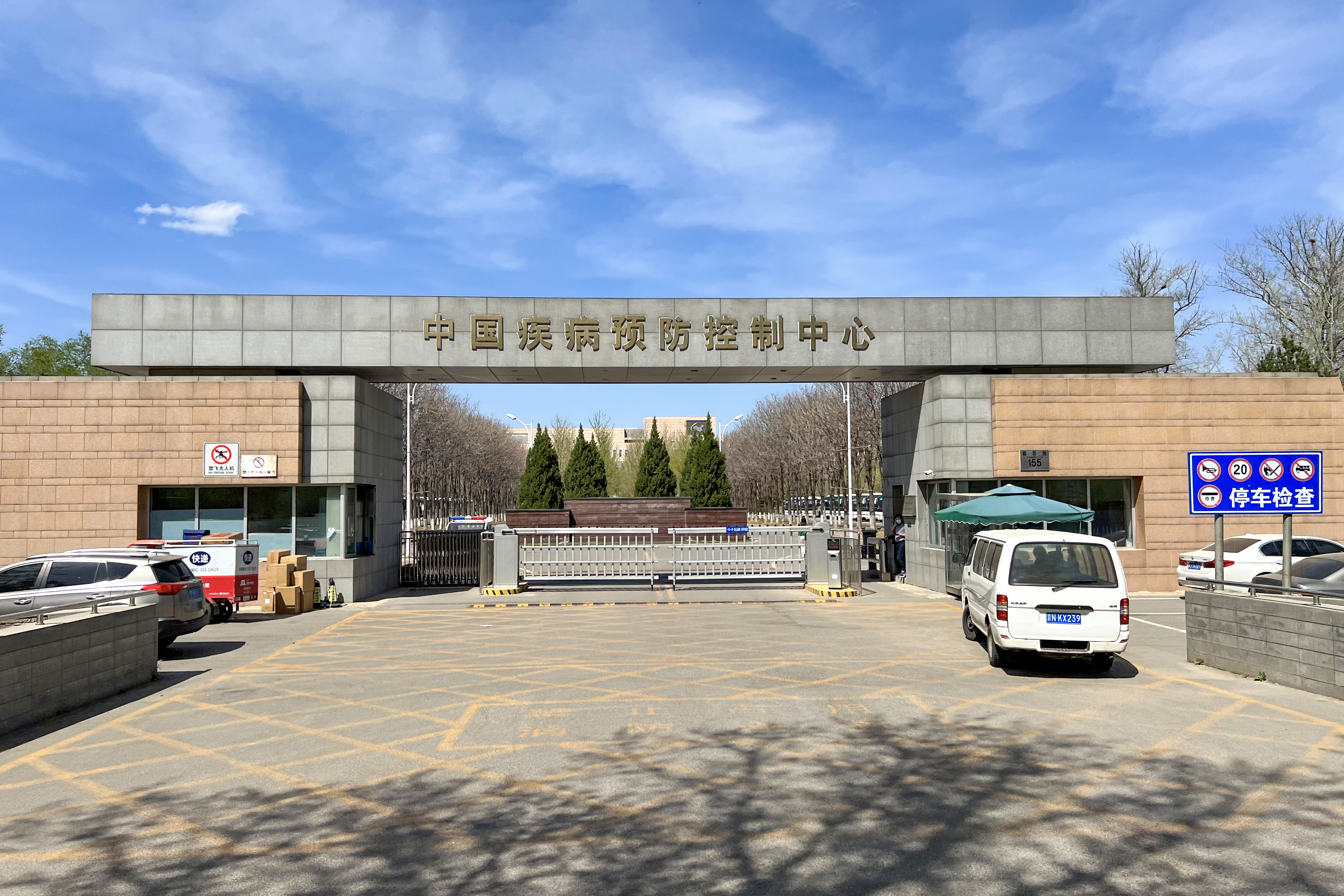
- Headquarter of Chinese Center for Disease Control and Prevention, 2022

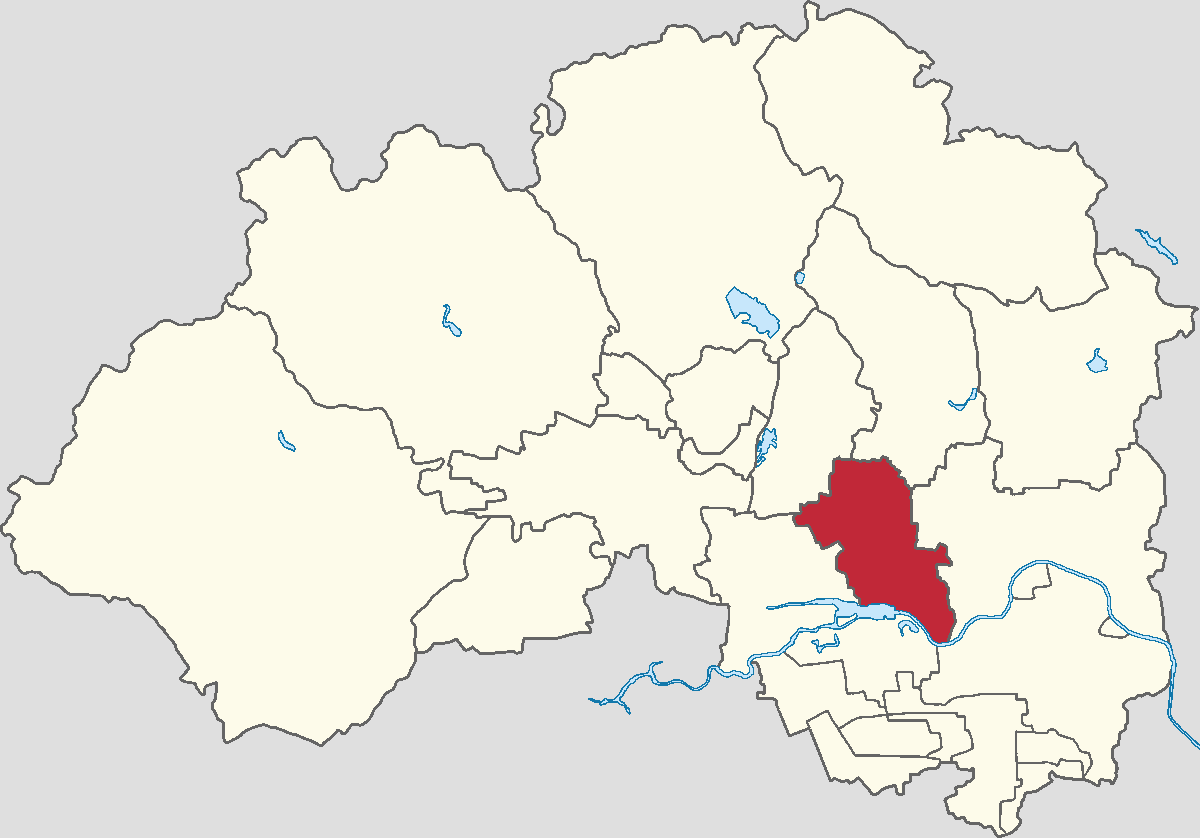
- Location of Baishan Town within Changping District

- Location within Beijing Location within China
- Coordinates: 40°09′56″N 116°18′52″E
- Country: China
- Municipality: Beijing
- District: Changping
- Village-level Divisions: 2 communities 13 villages

Area
  - Total: 34.54 km^{2} (13.34 sq mi)
- Elevation: 50 m (160 ft)

Population (2020)
  - Total: 36,546
  - Density: 1,058/km^{2} (2,740/sq mi)
- Time zone: UTC+8 (China Standard)
- Postal code: 102211
- Area code: 010

Baishan Town (simplified Chinese: 百善镇; traditional Chinese: 百善鎮; pinyin: Bǎishàn Zhèn) is a town located in the eastern part of Changping District, Beijing, China. Bounded by part of Taihang Mountain Range in its north, Baishan is located south of Nanshao and Cuicun Towns, west of Xiaotangshan Town, as well as north and east of Shahe Town. Its population was 36,546 as of 2020.

== History ==
History of Baishan Town
Year	Status	Under
1948–1949	10th District	Changshun United County
1949–1950	3rd District	Changping County
1950–1953	2nd District 4th District	Changping County
1953–1956	Baishan Township Shiziying Township Niufangjuan Township Xinlitun Township Wangzhuang Township	Changping County
1956–1958	Baishan Township Songlanbao Township	Changping County
1958–1961	Part of Xiaotangshan People's Commune	Changping County
1961–1982	Baishan People's Commune	Changping County
1982–1997	Baishan Township	Changping County
1997–1999	Baishan Town	Changping County
1999–present	Baishan Town	Changping District

== Administrative divisions ==
As of the time in writing, Baishan Town consists of 15 subdivisions, more specifically 2 communities and 13 villages:

Administrative division code	Subdivision names	Name transliteration	Type
110114113001	善缘家园社区	Shanyuanjiayuansheqv	Community
110114113002	林溪园社区	Linxiyuansheqv	Community
110114113201	百善村	Baishancun	Village
110114113202	吕各庄村	Lügezhuangcun	Village
110114113203	半壁街村	Banbijiecun	Village
110114113204	下东廓村	Xiadonglangcun	Village
110114113205	上东廓村	Shangdonglangcun	Village
110114113206	牛房圈村	Niufangjuancun	Village
110114113207	二德庄村	Erdezhuangcun	Village
110114113208	东沙屯村	Dongshatuncun	Village
110114113209	孟祖村	Mengzucun	Village
110114113210	良各庄村	Lianggezhuangcun	Village
110114113211	狮子营村	Shiziyingcun	Village
110114113212	泥洼村	Niwacun	Village
110114113213	钟家营村	Zhongjiayingcun	Village

== See also ==
- List of township-level divisions of Beijing
