= Yanshou, Beijing =

Town located in Beijing, China

Yanshou Town 延寿镇
- Town
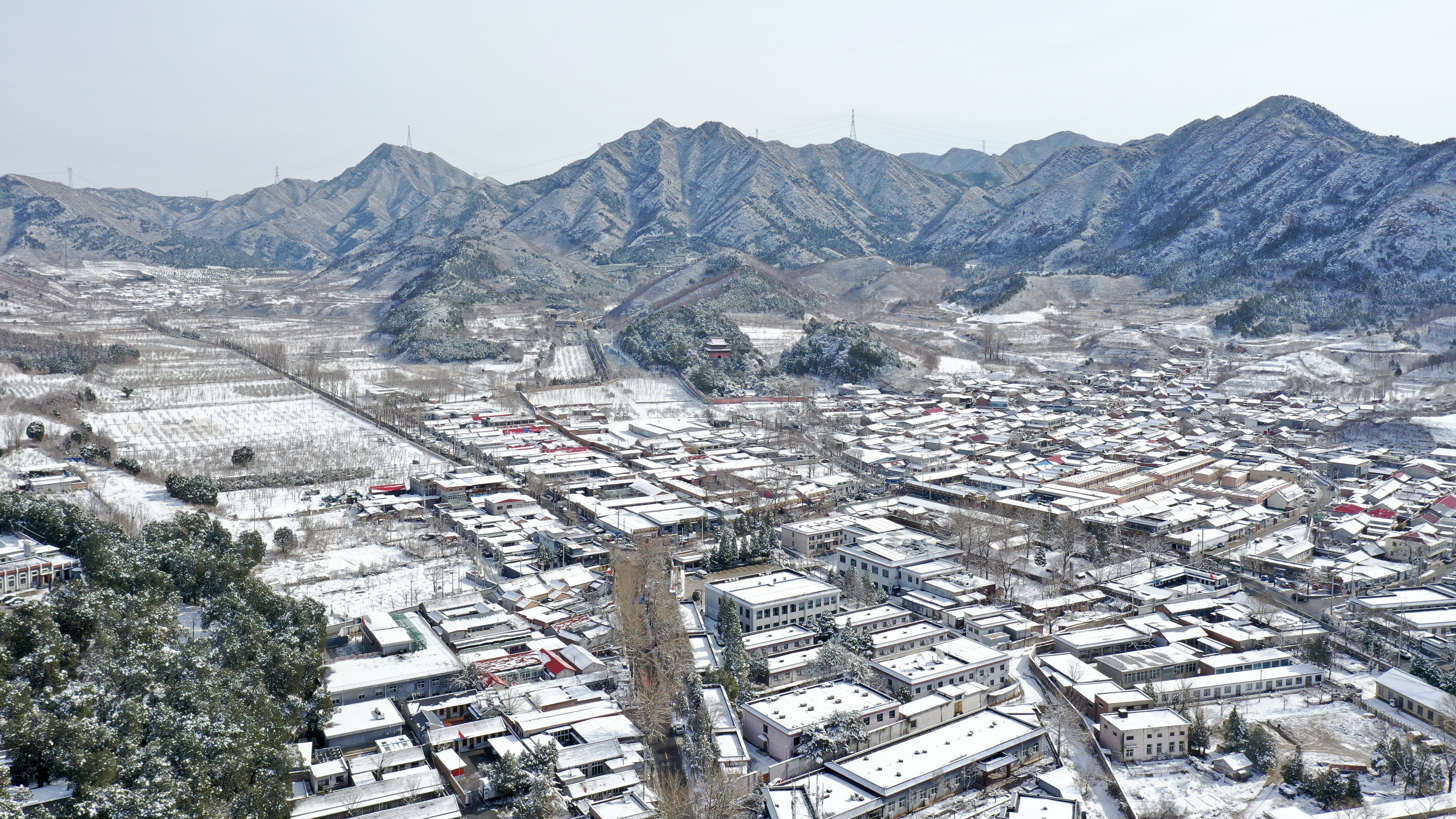
- Aerial view of Jingling Village, 2022

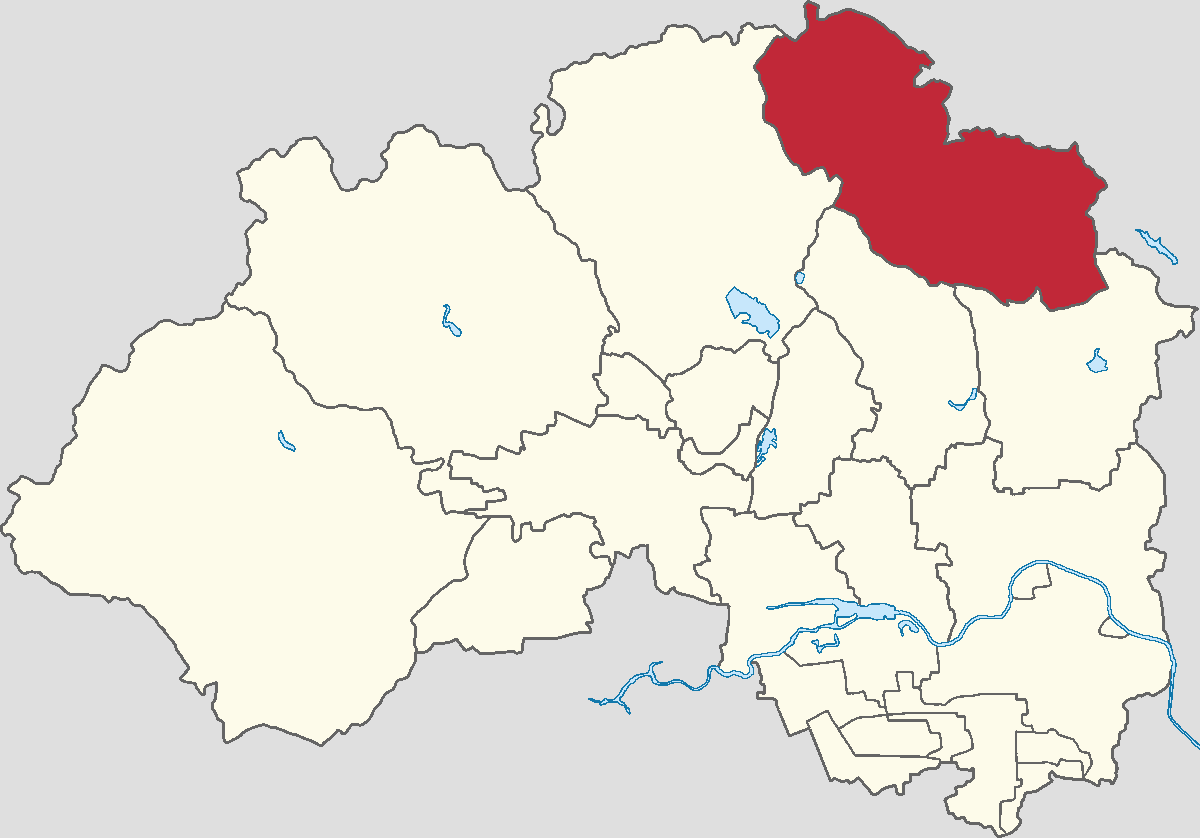
- Location within Changping District

- Location within Beijing Location within China
- Coordinates: 40°19′39″N 116°20′10″E
- Country: China
- Municipality: Beijing
- District: Changping
- Village-level Divisions: 17 villages

Area
  - Total: 126.6 km^{2} (48.9 sq mi)
- Elevation: 131 m (430 ft)

Population (2020)
  - Total: 7,766
  - Density: 61.34/km^{2} (158.9/sq mi)
- Time zone: UTC+8 (China Standard)
- Postal code: 102213
- Area code: 010

Yanshou Town (simplified Chinese: 延寿镇; traditional Chinese: 延壽鎮; pinyin: Yánshòu Zhèn) is a town situated in the northeast of Changping District, Beijing, China. Surrounded by parts of Taihang Mountain Range on three sides, Yanshou Town borders Dazhuangke Township and Jiuduhe Town in its north, Qiaozi Town in its east, Xingshou and Cuicun Towns in its south, and Shisanling Town in its west. It had a census population of 7,766 as of 2020.

This town was created from parts of Changling and Xingshou Towns in 2011. It was named after Yanshou (Chinese: 延寿; lit. 'Extend Lifespan') Temple within its border.

== Administrative divisions ==
So far in 2021, Yanshou Town is made up of 17 villages:

Administrative division code	Subdivision names	Name transliterations
110114120201	黑山寨村	Heishancun
110114120202	沙岭村	Shalingcun
110114120203	望宝川村	Wangbaochuancun
110114120204	慈悲峪村	Cibeiyucun
110114120205	南庄村	Nanzhuangcun
110114120206	分水岭村	Fenshuilingcun
110114120207	辛庄村	Xinzhuangcun
110114120208	北庄村	Beizhuangcun
110114120209	下庄村	Xiazhuangcun
110114120210	上庄村	Shangzhuangcun
110114120211	海字村	Haizicun
110114120212	西湖村	Xihucun
110114120213	湖门村	Humencun
110114120214	连山石村	Lianshanshicun
110114120215	花果山村	Huaguoshancun
110114120216	木厂村	Muchangcun
110114120217	百合村	Baihecun

== Gallery ==
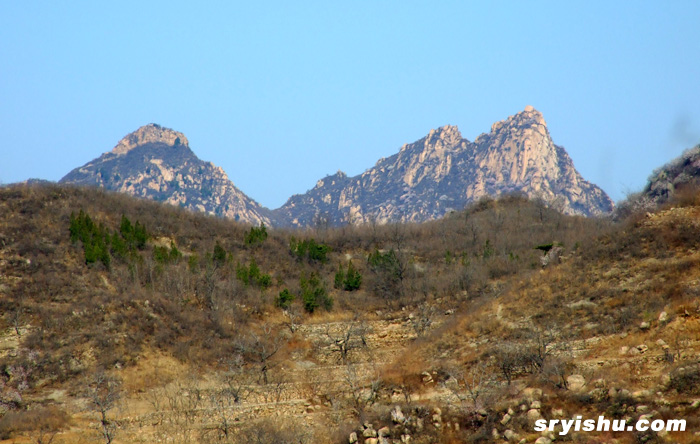
Tiebiyin Mountain on the north of Beizhuang Village, 2008

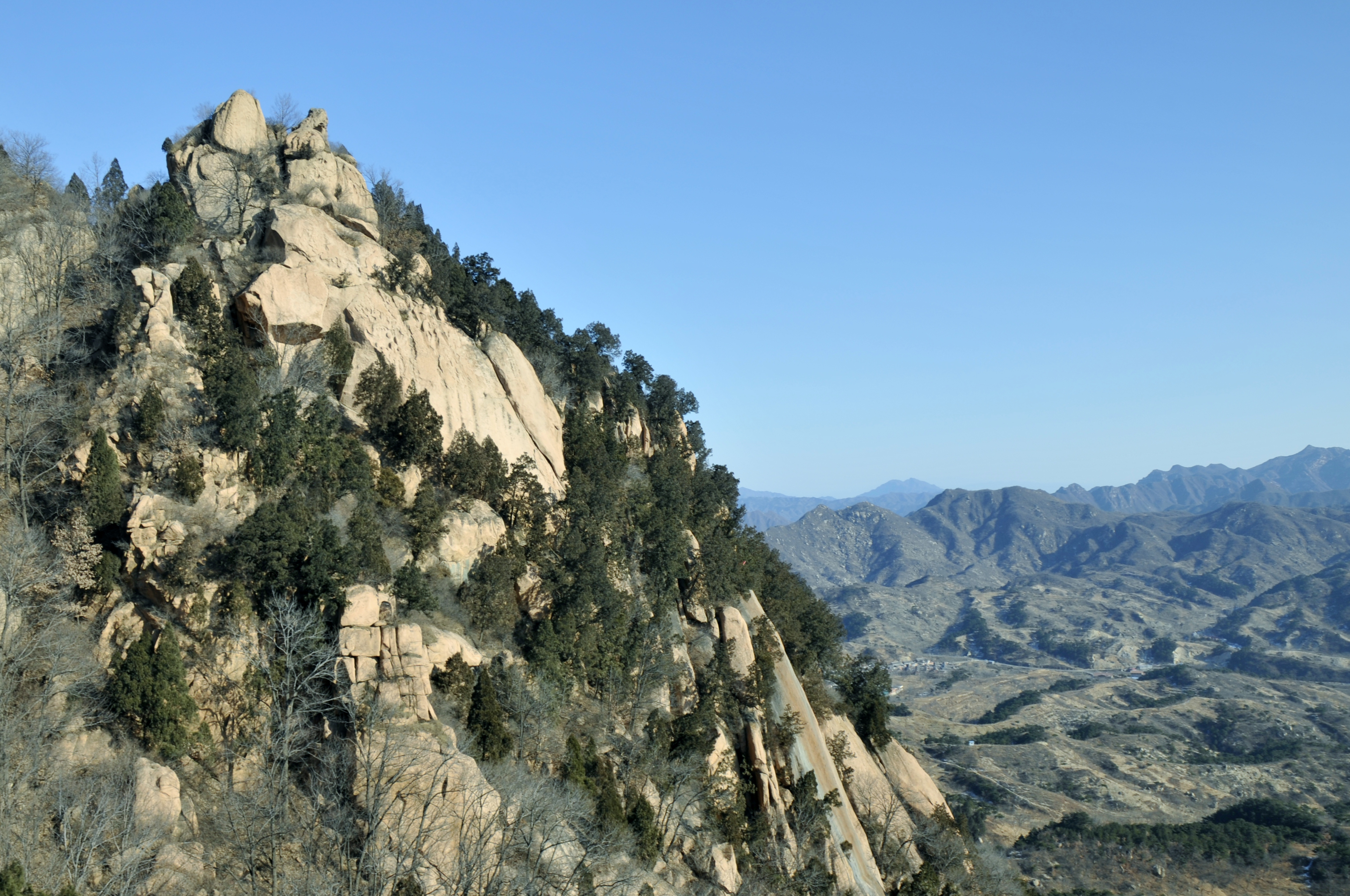
Cliff in Yin Mountain, part of Yinshan Talin Site, 2011

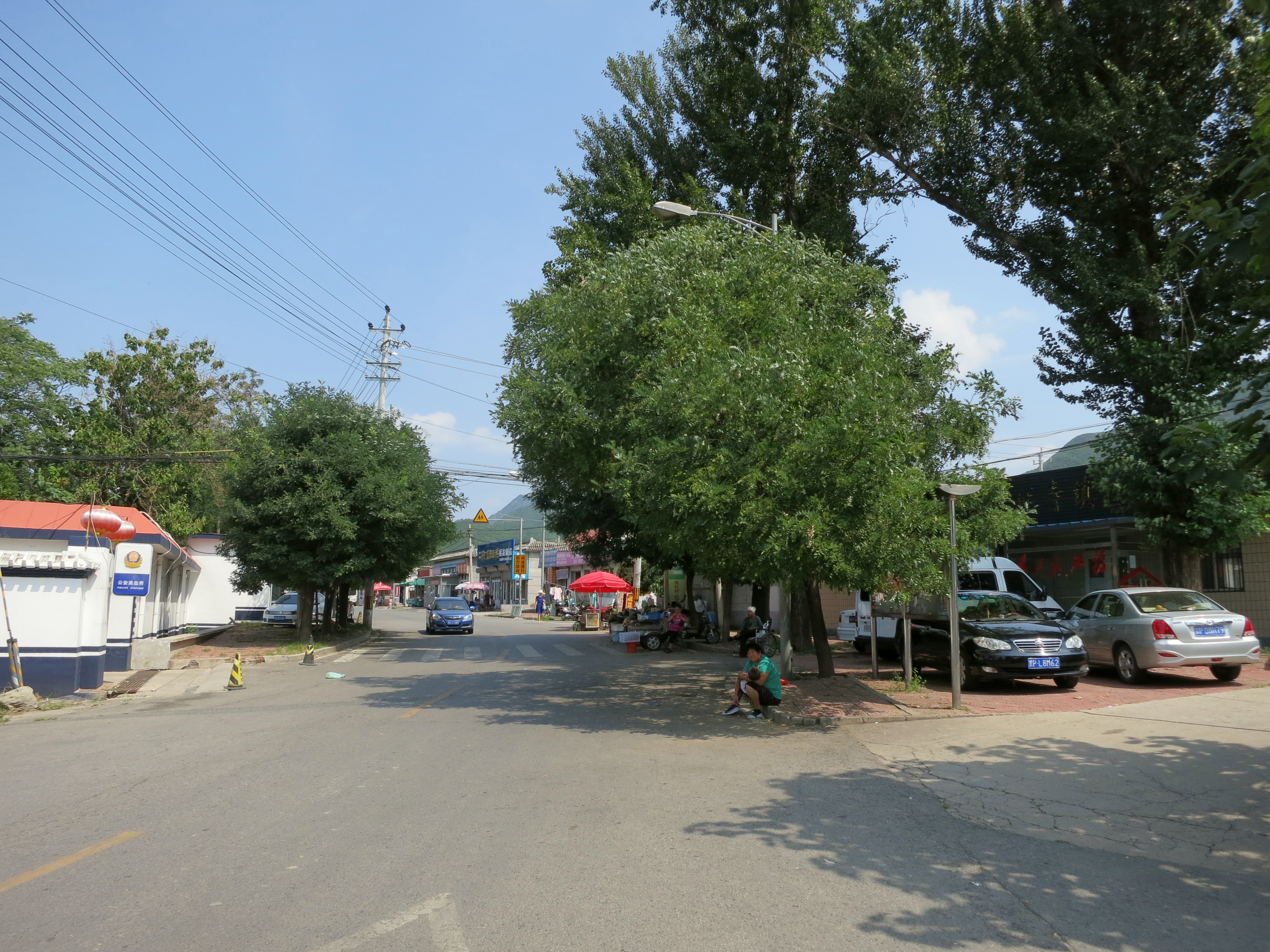
Huanling Road within Yanshou Town, 2015

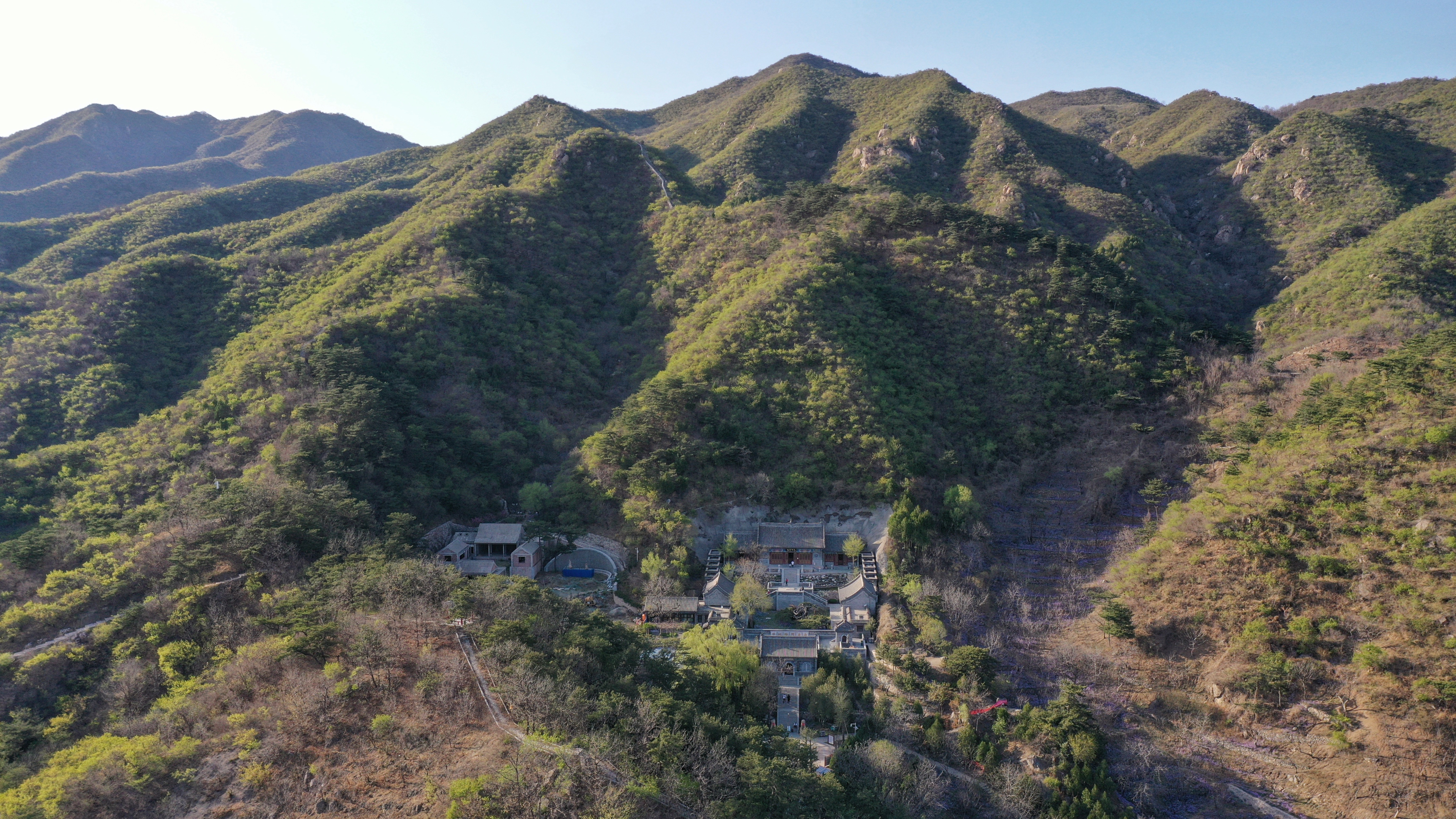
Aerial view of Yanshou Temple, 2022

== See also ==
- List of township-level divisions of Beijing
