= Changping, Beijing =

Changping 昌平区
- District
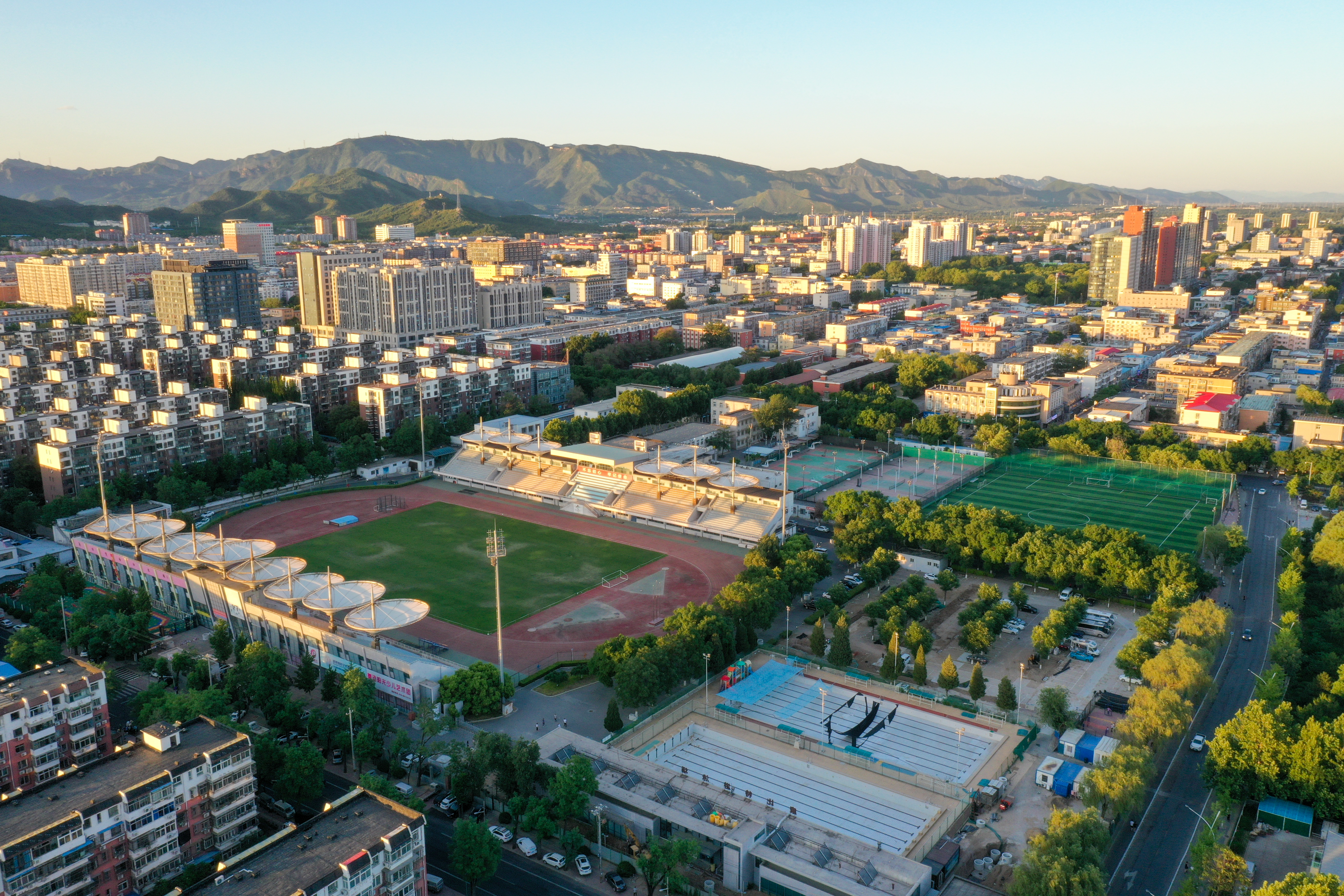
- Changping District in May 2022
- Interactive map of Changping
- Coordinates (Changping government): 40°13′16″N 116°13′52″E
- Country: People's Republic of China
- Municipality: Beijing
- Township-level divisions: 8 subdistricts 10 towns
- District seat: Chengbei Subdistrict (城北街道)

Area
  - Total: 1,352 km^{2} (522 sq mi)

Population (2020)
  - Total: 2,269,487
  - Density: 1,679/km^{2} (4,348/sq mi)
- Time zone: UTC+8 (China Standard)
- Area code: 0010

Changping District (Chinese: 昌平区; pinyin: Chāngpíng Qū), formerly Changping County (昌平县), is a district situated in the suburbs of north and northwest Beijing. Changping has a population of 2,269,487 as of November 2020, making it the most populous suburban district of Beijing.

== History ==
Changping County and Jundu County which administered the area were established in the Han dynasty. Changping was incorporated into Jundu when the Northern Wei dominated; however, the condition was reversed since the Eastern Wei. The county was promoted as Changping subprefecture had jurisdiction over Miyun, Shunyi and Huairou, in the era of Zhengde during the Ming dynasty. These three counties were transferred to Shuntian Prefecture in the era of Yongzheng during the Qing dynasty. Changping became a county again after the Xinhai Revolution, and it was transferred to Beijing from Hebei in 1956.

== Geography ==
Changping District, covering an area of 1,430 square kilometres (550 sq mi), contains two subdistricts of the city of Changping and 15 towns (five of which are suburbs of Beijing) with total population of 1.83 million (2012), a rapid increase from the 614,821 recorded in the 2000 census. About 34 km (21 mi) from the city center, Changping is renowned for its numerous scenic spots and tourist facilities, like Datangshan museum. It is rich in natural resources, mineral products, and rural products.

The urban area of Changping (116,961 in subdistricts) has an area of 16 km^{2} (6.2 sq mi) and an estimated population of 130,000. Other major urban areas are Nankou (70,000) and Yangfang (40,000).

=== Climate ===
Changping District has a humid continental climate (Köppen climate classification Dwa). The average annual temperature in Changping is 13.0 °C (55.4 °F). The average annual rainfall is 517.9 mm (20.39 in) with July as the wettest month. The temperatures are highest on average in July, at around 26.8 °C (80.2 °F), and lowest in January, at around −3.0 °C (26.6 °F).

Climate data for Changping District, elevation 76 m (249 ft), (1991–2020 normals, extremes 1981–present)
| Month | Jan | Feb | Mar | Apr | May | Jun | Jul | Aug | Sep | Oct | Nov | Dec | Year |
|---|---|---|---|---|---|---|---|---|---|---|---|---|---|
| Record high °C (°F) | 14.6 (58.3) | 20.5 (68.9) | 29.2 (84.6) | 33.3 (91.9) | 38.5 (101.3) | 40.7 (105.3) | 41.4 (106.5) | 37.5 (99.5) | 34.7 (94.5) | 31.1 (88.0) | 23.1 (73.6) | 19.3 (66.7) | 41.4 (106.5) |
| Mean daily maximum °C (°F) | 2.3 (36.1) | 6.2 (43.2) | 13.2 (55.8) | 21.2 (70.2) | 27.5 (81.5) | 30.9 (87.6) | 31.8 (89.2) | 30.8 (87.4) | 26.4 (79.5) | 19.3 (66.7) | 10.3 (50.5) | 3.5 (38.3) | 18.6 (65.5) |
| Daily mean °C (°F) | −3.0 (26.6) | 0.3 (32.5) | 7.1 (44.8) | 15.1 (59.2) | 21.3 (70.3) | 25.1 (77.2) | 26.8 (80.2) | 25.7 (78.3) | 20.6 (69.1) | 13.3 (55.9) | 4.8 (40.6) | −1.4 (29.5) | 13.0 (55.4) |
| Mean daily minimum °C (°F) | −7.3 (18.9) | −4.7 (23.5) | 1.3 (34.3) | 8.6 (47.5) | 14.6 (58.3) | 19.4 (66.9) | 22.3 (72.1) | 21.2 (70.2) | 15.5 (59.9) | 8.2 (46.8) | 0.3 (32.5) | −5.5 (22.1) | 7.8 (46.1) |
| Record low °C (°F) | −19.7 (−3.5) | −16.6 (2.1) | −12.7 (9.1) | −2.1 (28.2) | 3.0 (37.4) | 10.4 (50.7) | 14.3 (57.7) | 13.0 (55.4) | 4.3 (39.7) | −4.3 (24.3) | −13.1 (8.4) | −16.2 (2.8) | −19.7 (−3.5) |
| Average precipitation mm (inches) | 2.0 (0.08) | 4.6 (0.18) | 9.4 (0.37) | 17.9 (0.70) | 35.3 (1.39) | 82.3 (3.24) | 170.4 (6.71) | 102.0 (4.02) | 54.3 (2.14) | 24.8 (0.98) | 12.4 (0.49) | 2.5 (0.10) | 517.9 (20.4) |
| Average precipitation days (≥ 0.1 mm) | 1.4 | 2.3 | 3.1 | 4.4 | 6.3 | 10.0 | 13.5 | 10.7 | 7.9 | 5.1 | 2.9 | 1.8 | 69.4 |
| Average snowy days | 2.5 | 2.4 | 1.5 | 0.2 | 0 | 0 | 0 | 0 | 0 | 0 | 2.0 | 2.9 | 11.5 |
| Average relative humidity (%) | 39 | 39 | 38 | 40 | 45 | 57 | 70 | 70 | 64 | 56 | 50 | 42 | 51 |
| Mean monthly sunshine hours | 199.4 | 197.3 | 235.3 | 248.7 | 271.5 | 228.7 | 190.9 | 205.8 | 207.6 | 207.8 | 179.6 | 187.5 | 2,560.1 |
| Percentage possible sunshine | 66 | 65 | 63 | 62 | 61 | 51 | 42 | 49 | 56 | 61 | 61 | 65 | 59 |
Source: China Meteorological Administration all-time extreme temperature

== Administrative divisions ==
There are 8 subdistricts and 14 towns in the district.

| Name | Chinese (S) | Hanyu Pinyin | Population (2020) | Area (km^{2}) |
|---|---|---|---|---|
| Chengbei Subdistrict | 城北街道 | Chéngběi Jiēdào | 228,561 | 18.90 |
| Chengnan Subdistrict | 城南街道 | Chéngnán Jiēdào | 88,963 | 14.13 |
| Huilongguan Subdistrict | 回龙观街道 | Huílóngguān Jiēdào | 166,074 | |
| Longzeyuan Subdistrict | 龙泽园街道 | Lóngzéyuán Jiēdào | 181,906 | |
| Shigezhuang Subdistrict | 史各庄街道 | Shǐgèzhuāng Jiēdào | 64,910 | |
| Tiantongyuanbei Subdistrict | 天通苑北街道 | Tiāntōngyuànběi Jiēdào | 142,707 | 4.70 |
| Tiantongyuannan Subdistrict | 天通苑南街道 | Tiāntōngyuànnán Jiēdào | 116,529 | 5.60 |
| Huoying Subdistrict | 霍营街道 | Huòyíng Jiēdào | 93,545 | 4.60 |
| Dongxiaokou town | 东小口镇 | Dōngxiǎokǒu Zhèn | 85,874 | 32.20 |
| Nankou town | 南口镇 | Nánkǒu Zhèn | 82,146 | 202.50 |
| Machikou town | 马池口镇 | Mǎchíkǒu Zhèn | 87,506 | 58.40 |
| Shahe town | 沙河镇 | Shāhé Zhèn | 294,408 | 56.00 |
| Yangfang town | 阳坊镇 | Yángfāng Zhèn | 26,470 | 40.52 |
| Xiaotangshan town | 小汤山镇 | Xiǎotāngshān Zhèn | 80,273 | 70.10 |
| Nanshao town | 南邵镇 | Nánshào Zhèn | 65,403 | 35.20 |
| Cuicun town | 崔村镇 | Cuīcūn Zhèn | 24,630 | 60.00 |
| Baishan town | 百善镇 | Bǎi shàn Zhèn | 36,546 | 35.14 |
| Beiqijia town | 北七家镇 | Běiqījiā Zhèn | 308,907 | 21.4 |
| Liucun town | 流村镇 | Liúcūn Zhèn | 18,139 | 257.00 |
| Shisanling town | 十三陵镇 | Shísānlíng Zhèn | 34,085 | 158.80 |
| Xingshou town | 兴寿镇 | Xìngshòu Zhèn | 34,139 | 75.00 |
| Yanshou town | 延寿镇 | Yánshòu Zhèn | 7,766 | 113.31 |

== Economy ==
In 2017, the regional GDP of the district is 83.97 billion yuan, with GDP per capita at 40.7 thousand yuan.

== Features ==
- Ming Dynasty Tombs
- Cloud Platform at Juyong Pass, one of the "three great mountain passes" of the Great Wall of China
- Triathlon Venue for the Triathlon at the 2008 Summer Olympics
- Qincheng Prison of the Ministry of Public Security (near Xiaotangshan)
- Wonderland Amusement Park (Beijing)

== Central government ==
Chinese Center for Disease Control and Prevention has its headquarters in the district.

== Transport ==
Changping District is served by six metro lines operated by Beijing Subway – 5, 8, 13, 17, 18 and the Changping line. – and one commuter line operated by Beijing Suburban Railway (BCR).

=== Metro ===
- Line 5 - Tiantongyuan North, Tiantongyuan 18 , Tiantongyuan South
- Line 8 - Zhuxinzhuang Changping , Yuzhilu, Pingxifu, Huilongguan Dongdajie 18 , Huoying 13
- Line 13 - Longze, Huilongguan, Huoying 8
- Line 17 - Weilaikexuechengbei (Future Science City North), Weilaikexuecheng (Future Science City), Tiantongyuandong 18
- Line 18 - Huilongguan Xidajie, Wenhualu, Huilongguan Dongdajie 8 , Huoyingdong, Tiantongyuan 5 , Taipingzhuang, Tiantongyuandong 17
- Changping line - Life Science Park, Zhuxinzhuang 8 , Gonghuacheng, Shahe, Shahe University Park, Nanshao, Beishaowa, Changping Dongguan, Changping, Ming Tombs, Changping Xishankou

=== Beijing Suburban Railway ===
- Line S2 - Changping railway station, Nankou railway station, Huangtudian railway station
- Huairou–Miyun line - Changping North railway station

== Education ==
=== Colleges and universities ===
- China University of Petroleum (Beijing)
- Peking University Changping Campus
- Central University of Finance and Economics
- Beihang University
- China Foreign Affairs University
- China University of Political Science and Law Changping Campus

=== Primary and secondary schools ===
Public schools:

- Changping District No. 1 High School (北京市昌平区第一中学)
- Changping District No. 2 High School (北京市昌平区第二中学)

Private schools:

- Beijing Huijia Private School is in Changping District.
- Beijing Royal School
- The Korean International School in Beijing was previously located in Changping District.

== Gallery ==
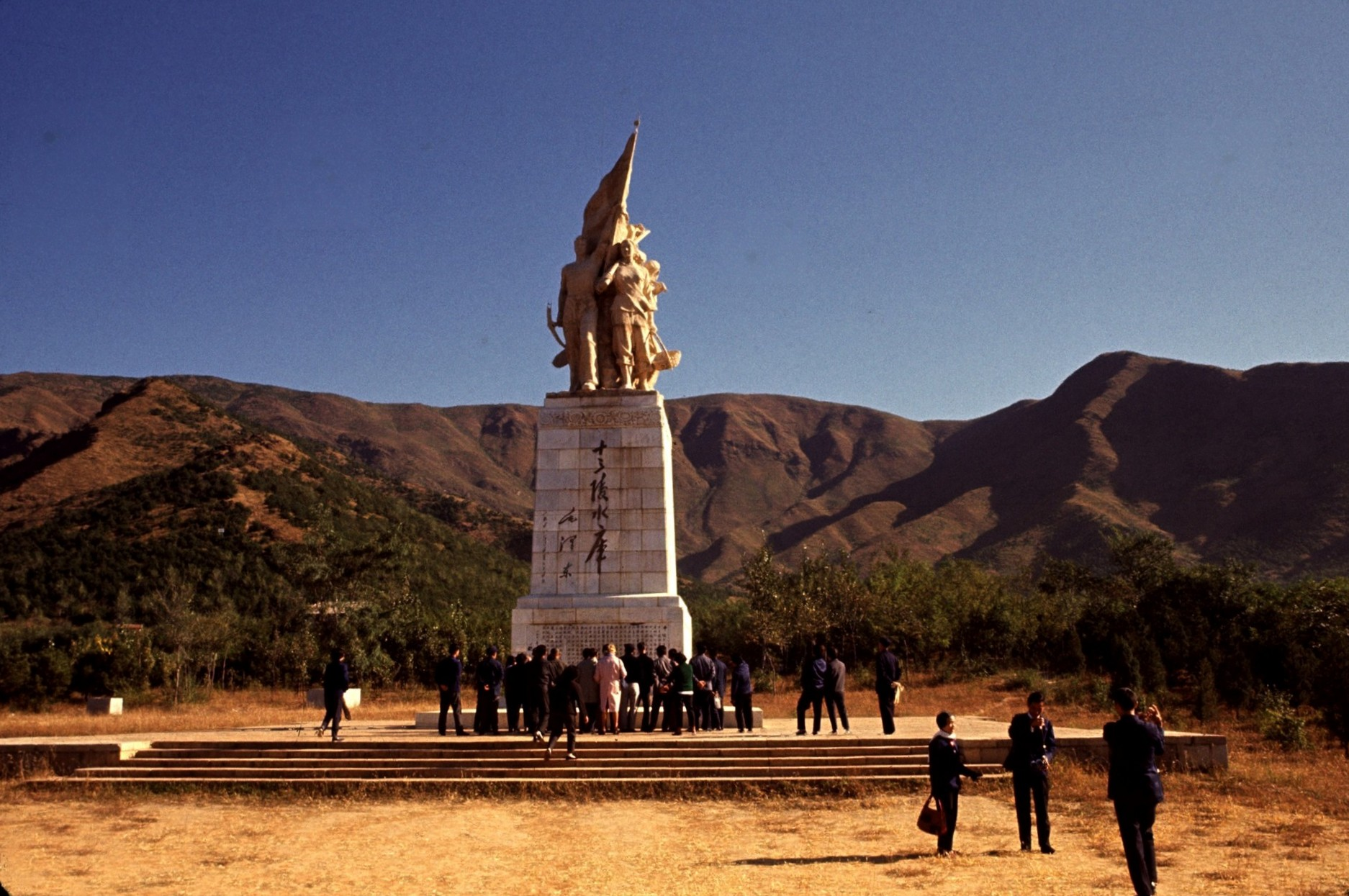
Shisanling Reservoir

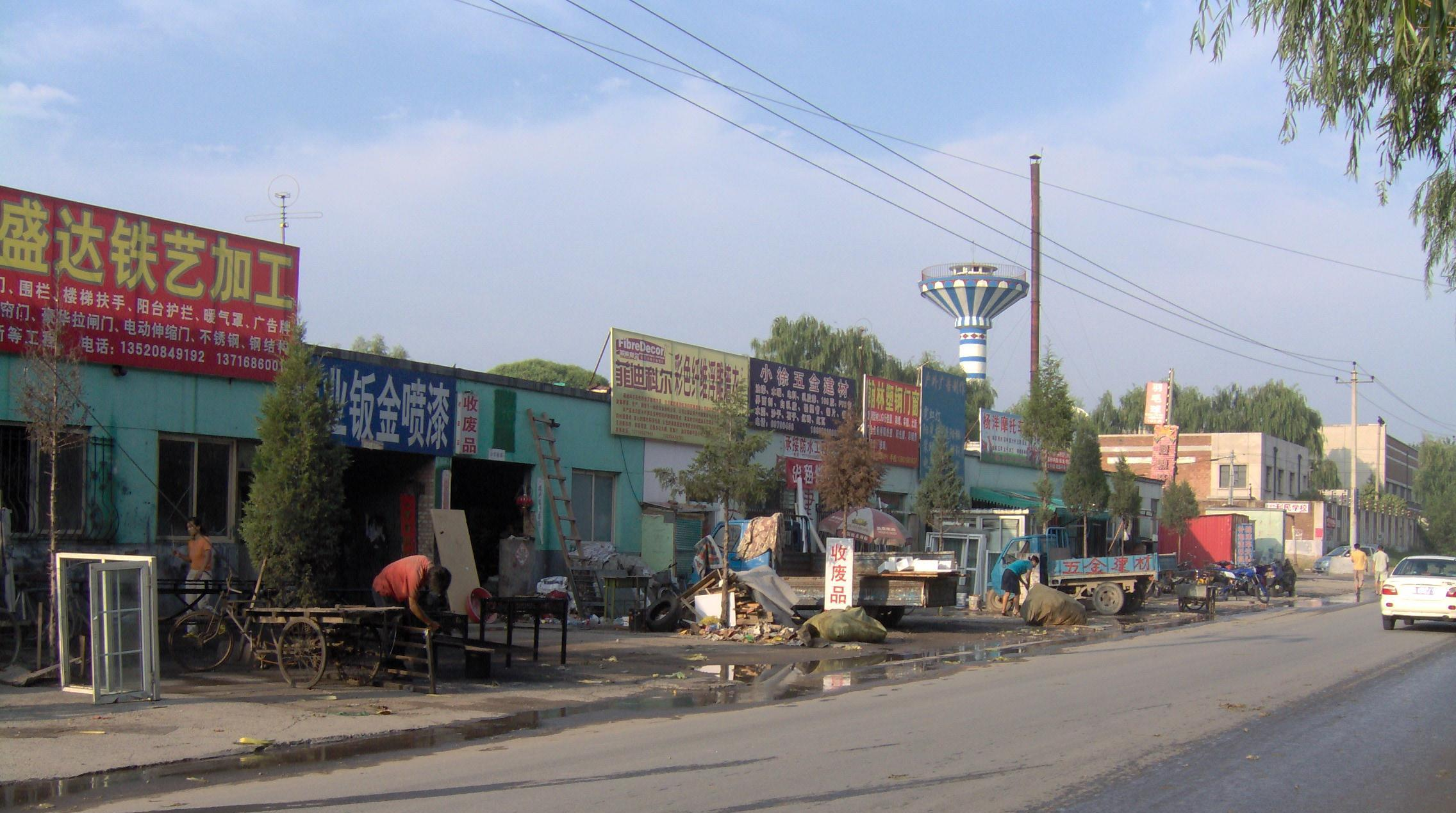
Jiutai Road (九台路) in northern Changping District

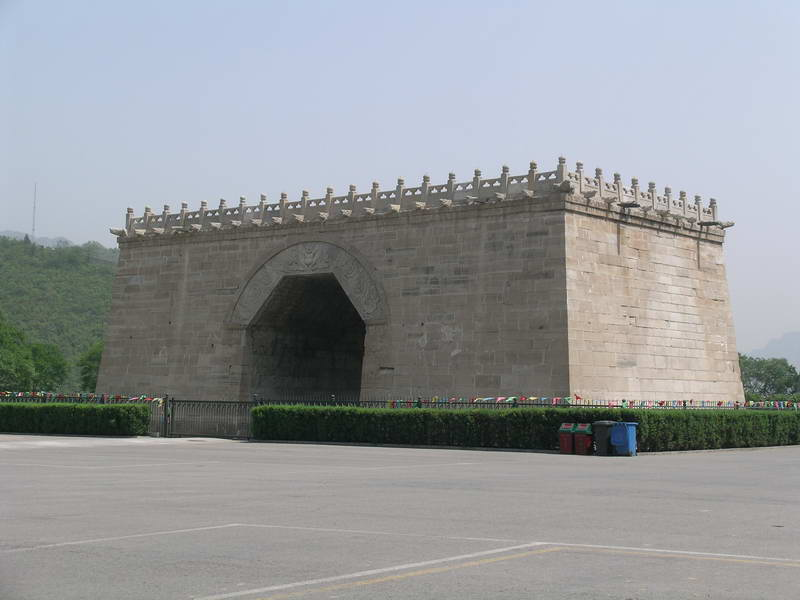
Cloud Platform at Juyongguan

== See also ==
- Changping railway station
- Changping North railway station
- Index: Districts of Beijing
- List of administrative divisions of Beijing
