= Liucun, Beijing =

Liucun Town 流村镇
- Town
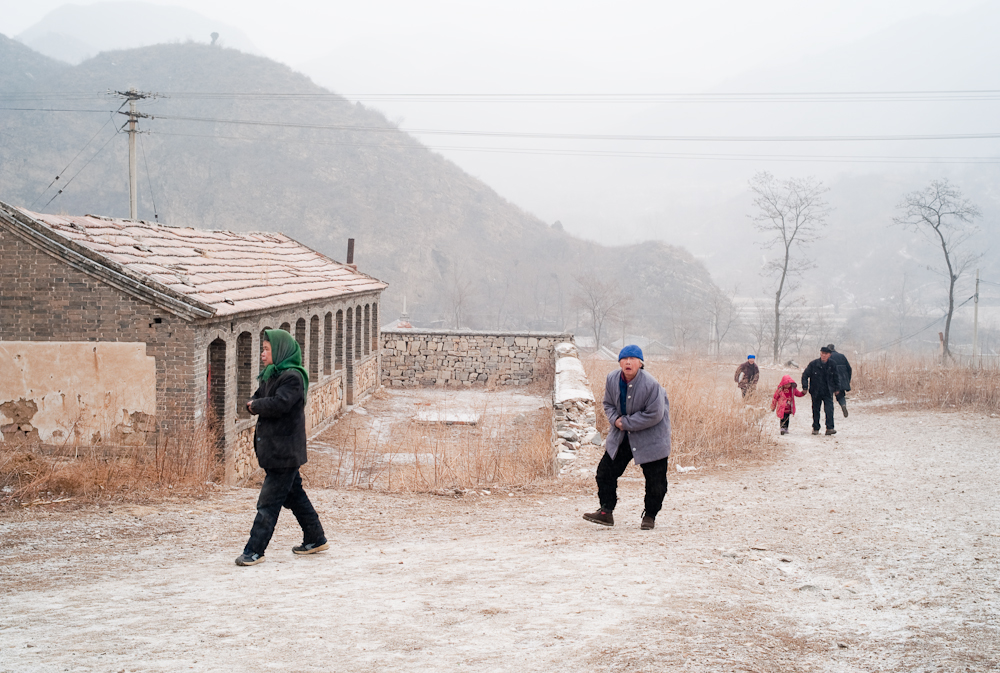
- Villagers in Changyucheng Village walking to a Chinese opera performance, 2010

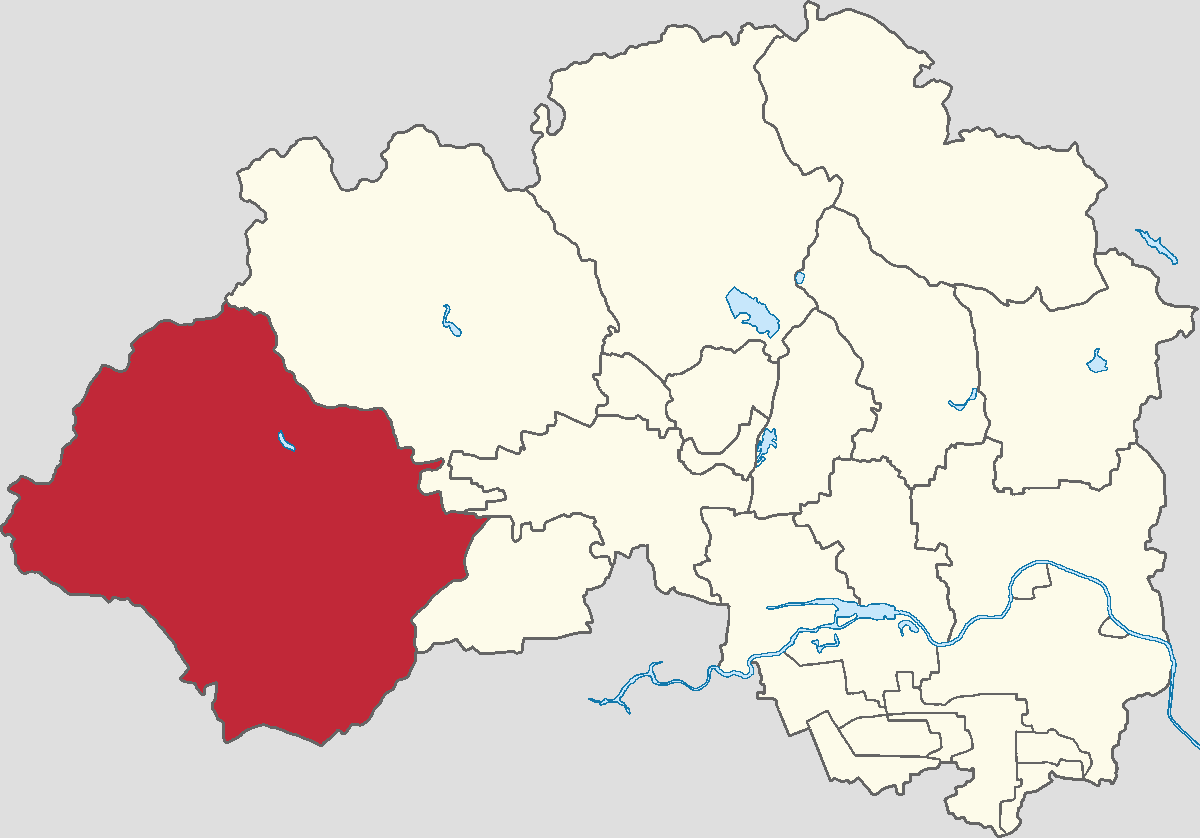
- Location within Changping District

- Location within Beijing Location within China
- Coordinates: 40°10′53″N 116°03′29″E
- Country: China
- Municipality: Beijing
- District: Changping
- Village-level Divisions: 28 villages

Area
  - Total: 270.3 km^{2} (104.4 sq mi)
- Elevation: 148 m (486 ft)

Population (2020)
  - Total: 18,139
  - Density: 67.11/km^{2} (173.8/sq mi)
- Time zone: UTC+8 (China Standard)
- Postal code: 102204
- Area code: 010

Liucun Town (simplified Chinese: 流村镇; traditional Chinese: 流村鎮; pinyin: Liúcūn Zhèn) is a town in Changping District, Beijing, China. Located in the eastern foothill of the Taihang Mountain Range, Liucun shares border with Nankou Town to its northeast, Yangfang and Machikou Town to its east, Sujiatuo and Miaofengshan Towns to its southeast, Yanchi Town to its southwest, and Ruiyunguan Township to its northwest. As of 2020, it had 18,139 residents under its administration.

== History ==
Timeline of Liucun's History
Year	Status	Under
1948 - 1956	Liu Village	Changwan County, Hebei
1956 - 1961	3rd District 6th District	Changping County, Beijing
1961 - 1983	Liucun People's Commune	Changping County, Beijing
1983 - 1997	Liucun Township	Changping County, Beijing
1997 - 1999	Liucun Town	Changping County, Beijing
1999–present	Liucun Town	Changping District

== Administrative divisions ==
In 2021, 28 villages constituted Liucun Town. They are listed below:

Administrative division code	Subdivision names	Name transliteration
110114118201	北庄村	Beizhuangcun
110114118202	下店村	Xiadiancun
110114118203	上店村	Shangdiancun
110114118204	南流村	Nanliucun
110114118205	西峰山村	Xifengshancun
110114118206	北流村	Beiliucun
110114118207	新建村	Xinjiancun
110114118208	白羊城村	Baiyangchengcun
110114118209	古将村	Gujiangcun
110114118210	黑寨村	Heisaicun
110114118211	王家园村	Wangjiayuancun
110114118212	高崖口村	Gaoyakoucun
110114118213	韩台村	Hantaicun
110114118214	北照台村	Beizhaotaicun
110114118215	狼儿峪村	Lang'eryucun
110114118216	菩萨鹿村	Pusalucun
110114118217	发电站村	Fadianzhancun
110114118218	漆园村	Qiyuancun
110114118219	瓦窑村	Wayaocun
110114118220	新开村	Xinkaicun
110114118221	溜石港村	Liushigangcun
110114118222	小水峪村	Xiaoshuiyucun
110114118223	王峪村	Wangyucun
110114118224	老峪沟村	Laoyugoucun
110114118225	马刨泉村	Mapaoquancun
110114118226	黄土洼村	Huangtuwacun
110114118227	禾子涧村	Hezijiancun
110114118228	长峪城村	Changyuchengcun

== Gallery ==
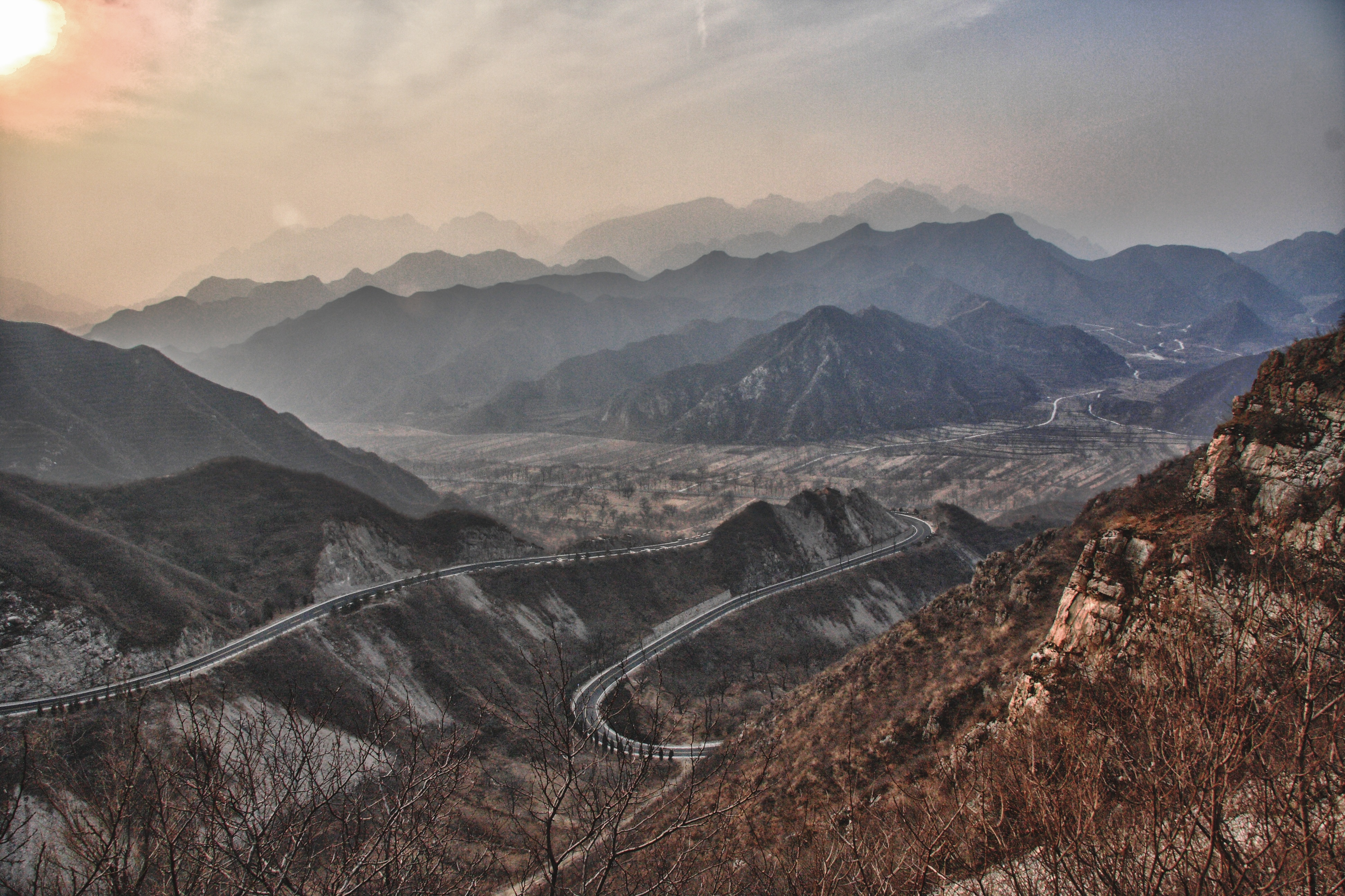
Aerial view of Mapaoquan Village, 2014

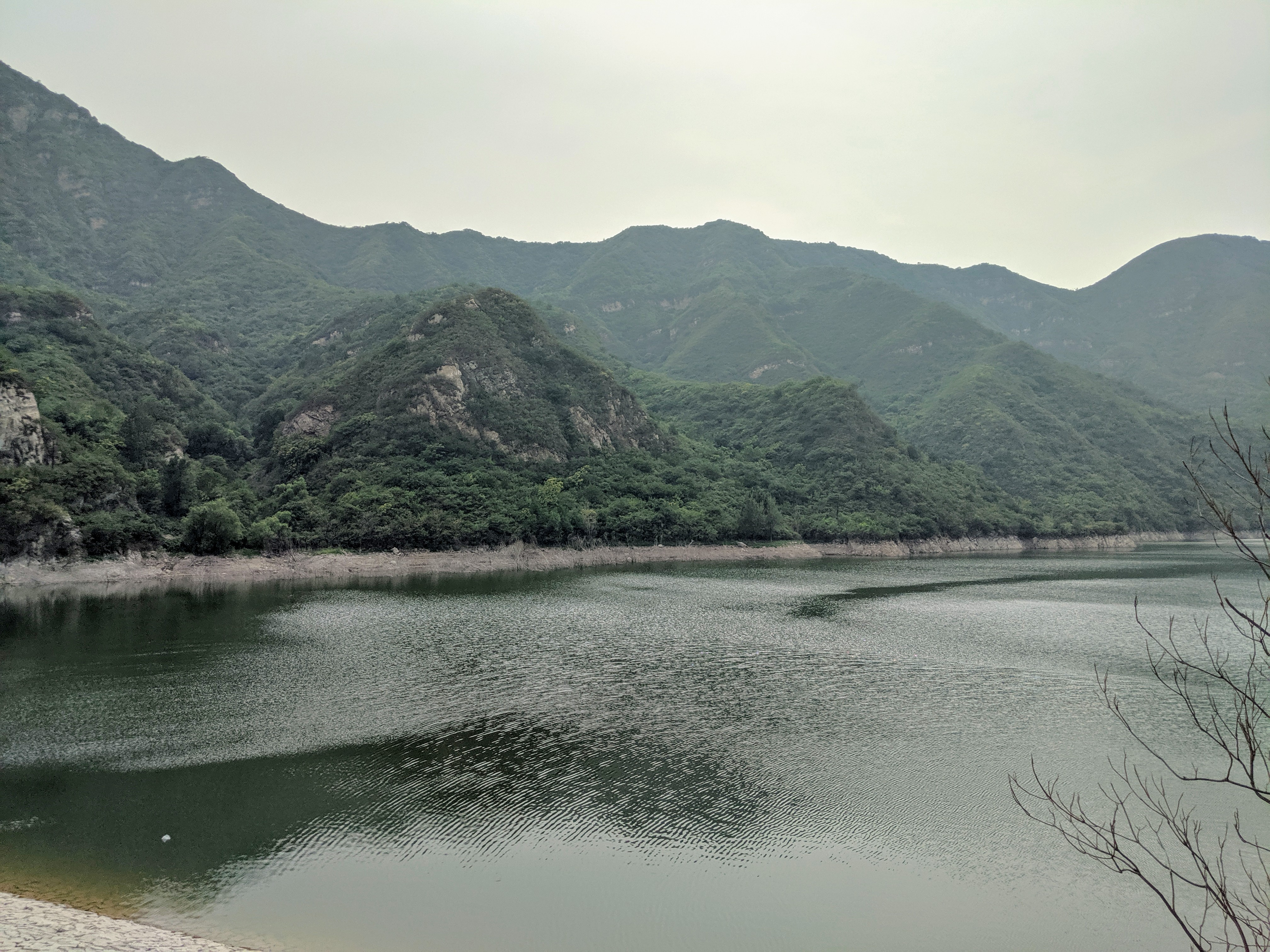
Wangjiayuan Reservoir, 2019

== See also ==
- List of township-level divisions of Beijing
