= Chengbei Subdistrict, Beijing =

Chengbei Subdistrict 城北街道
- Subdistrict
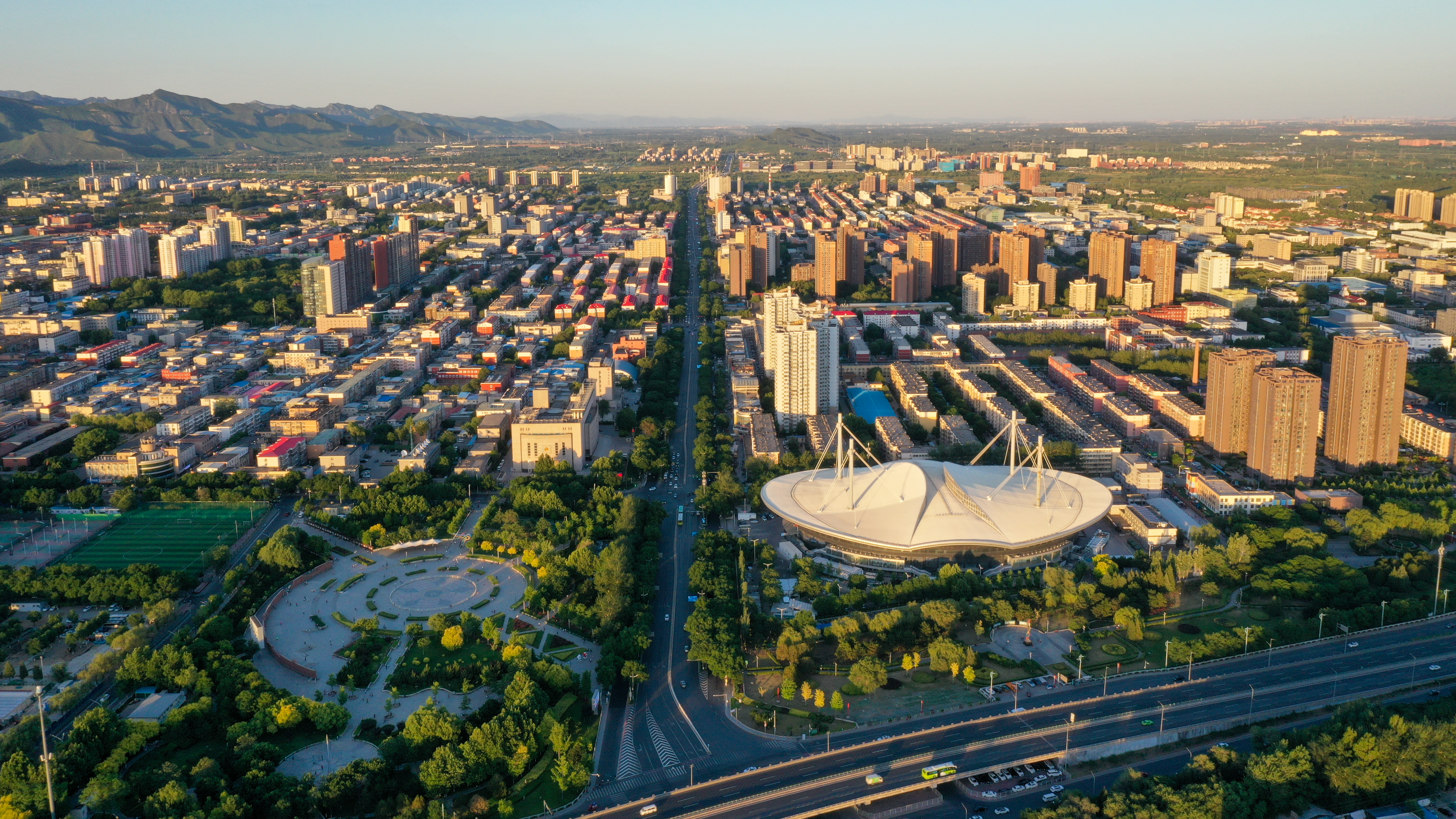
- Aerial view of Chengbei Subdistrict, 2022

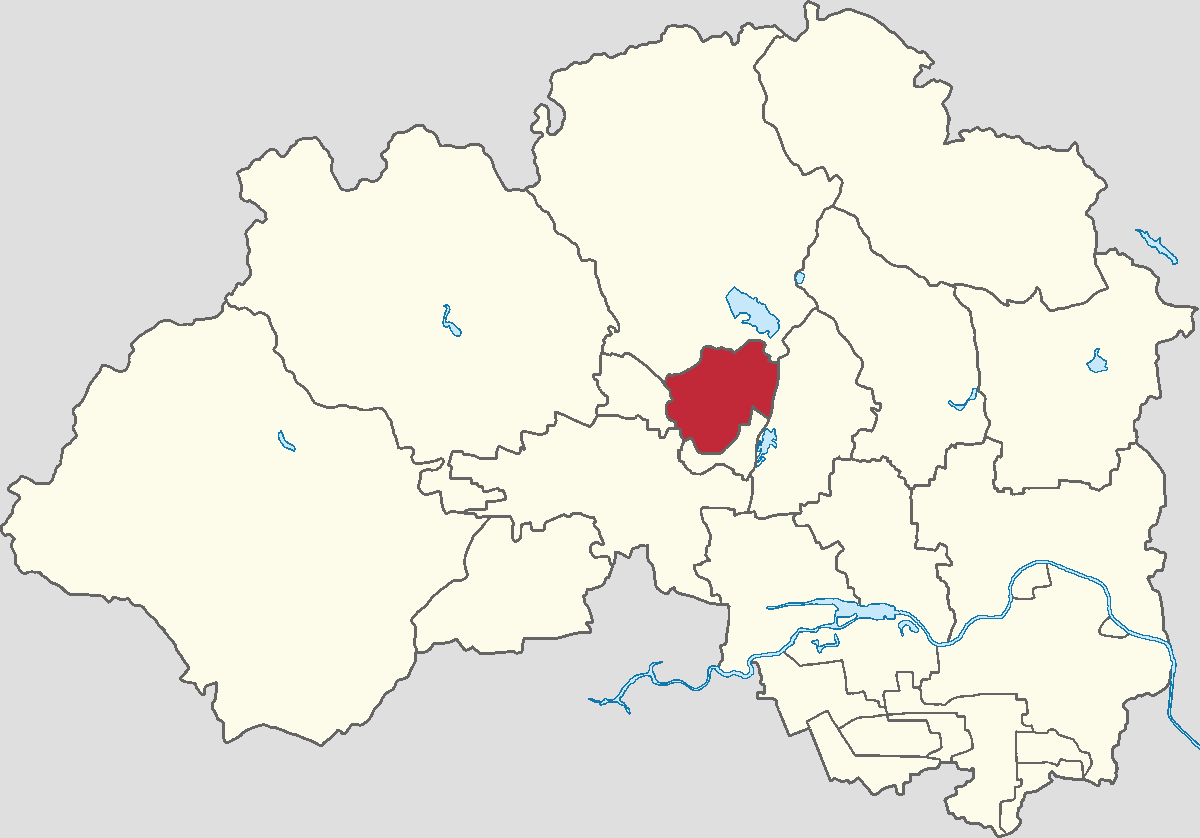
- Location of Chengbei Subdistrict within Changping District

- Location within Beijing Location within China
- Coordinates: 40°13′15″N 116°15′26″E
- Country: China
- Municipality: Beijing
- District: Changping
- Village-level Divisions: 46 communities 5 villages

Area
  - Total: 18.48 km^{2} (7.14 sq mi)
- Elevation: 63 m (207 ft)

Population (2020)
  - Total: 228,561
  - Density: 12,370/km^{2} (32,030/sq mi)
- Time zone: UTC+8 (China Standard)
- Postal code: 102200
- Area code: 010

Chengbei Subdistrict (Chinese: 城北街道; pinyin: Chéngběi Jiēdào) is a subdistrict in the center of Changping District, Beijing, China. It shares border with Shisanling Town in its north, Nanshao Town in its east, Chengnan Subdistrict and Machikou Town in its south, and Chengnan Subdistrict in its west. It was home to 228,561 residents as of 2020.

The subdistrict's name literally translates to "City North", which is referring to its location north of the old city gate.

== History ==
Timetable of Chengbei Subdistrict
Year	Status	Within
1450–1452		Yong'an City
1452–1513		Changping County
1513–1644		Changping Zhou
1644–1913		Bachang Circuit
1913–1990	Changping Town	Changping County
1990–1999	Chengqu Town	Changping County
1999–present	Chengbei Subdistrict	Changping District

== Administrative divisions ==
In the year 2021, there were 51 subdivisions within Chengbei Subdistrict, 46 of them were communities, and 5 were villages:

Administrative division code	Subdivision names	Name transliteration	Type
110114001001	一街	Yijie	Community
110114001003	二街	Erjie	Community
110114001004	三街	Sanjie	Community
110114001005	五街	Wujie	Community
110114001007	六街	Liujie	Community
110114001008	八街	Bajie	Community
110114001009	西关	Xiguan	Community
110114001014	永安	Yong'an	Community
110114001015	清秀园	Qingxiuyuan	Community
110114001016	松园	Songyuan	Community
110114001017	朝凤	Chaofeng	Community
110114001021	政法	Zhengfa	Community
110114001031	水关	Shuiguan	Community
110114001032	南环里	Nanhuanli	Community
110114001033	燕平路	Yanpinglu	Community
110114001034	亢山	Kangshan	Community
110114001035	东关北里	Dongguan Beili	Community
110114001036	安福苑	Anfuyuan	Community
110114001037	北城根	Beichenggen	Community
110114001038	建明里	Jianmingli	Community
110114001039	玉虚观	Yuxuguan	Community
110114001040	史家坑	Shijiakeng	Community
110114001041	西环里	Xihuanli	Community
110114001042	京科苑	Jingkeyuan	Community
110114001043	东关南里	Dongguan Nanli	Community
110114001044	城角路	Chengjiaolu	Community
110114001045	宁馨苑	Ningxinyuan	Community
110114001046	国通家园	Guotong Jiayuan	Community
110114001047	五城	Wucheng	Community
110114001048	灰厂路	Huichanglu	Community
110114001049	富松	Fusong	Community
110114001050	南关	Nanguan	Community
110114001051	创新园	Chuangxinyuan	Community
110114001052	昌园	Changyuan	Community
110114001053	亢山前路	Kangshan Qianlu	Community
110114001054	北环	Beihuan	Community
110114001055	宅新苑	Zhaixinyuan	Community
110114001056	嘉和园	Jiaheyuan	Community
110114001057	裕祥	Yuxiang	Community
110114001058	新悦家园	Xinyue Jiayuan	Community
110114001059	京科苑东区	Jingkeyuan Dongqu	Community
110114001060	观山悦	Guanshanyue	Community
110114001061	创新园南区	Chuangxinyuan Nanqu	Community
110114001062	怡园	Yiyuan	Community
110114001063	宽街	Kuanjie	Community
110114001064	创新园东区	Chuangxinyuan Dongqu	Community
110114001201	二街	Erjie	Village
110114001202	三街	Sanjie	Village
110114001203	六街	Liujie	Village
110114001204	西关	Xiguan	Village
110114001205	朝凤	Chaofeng	Village

== Gallery ==
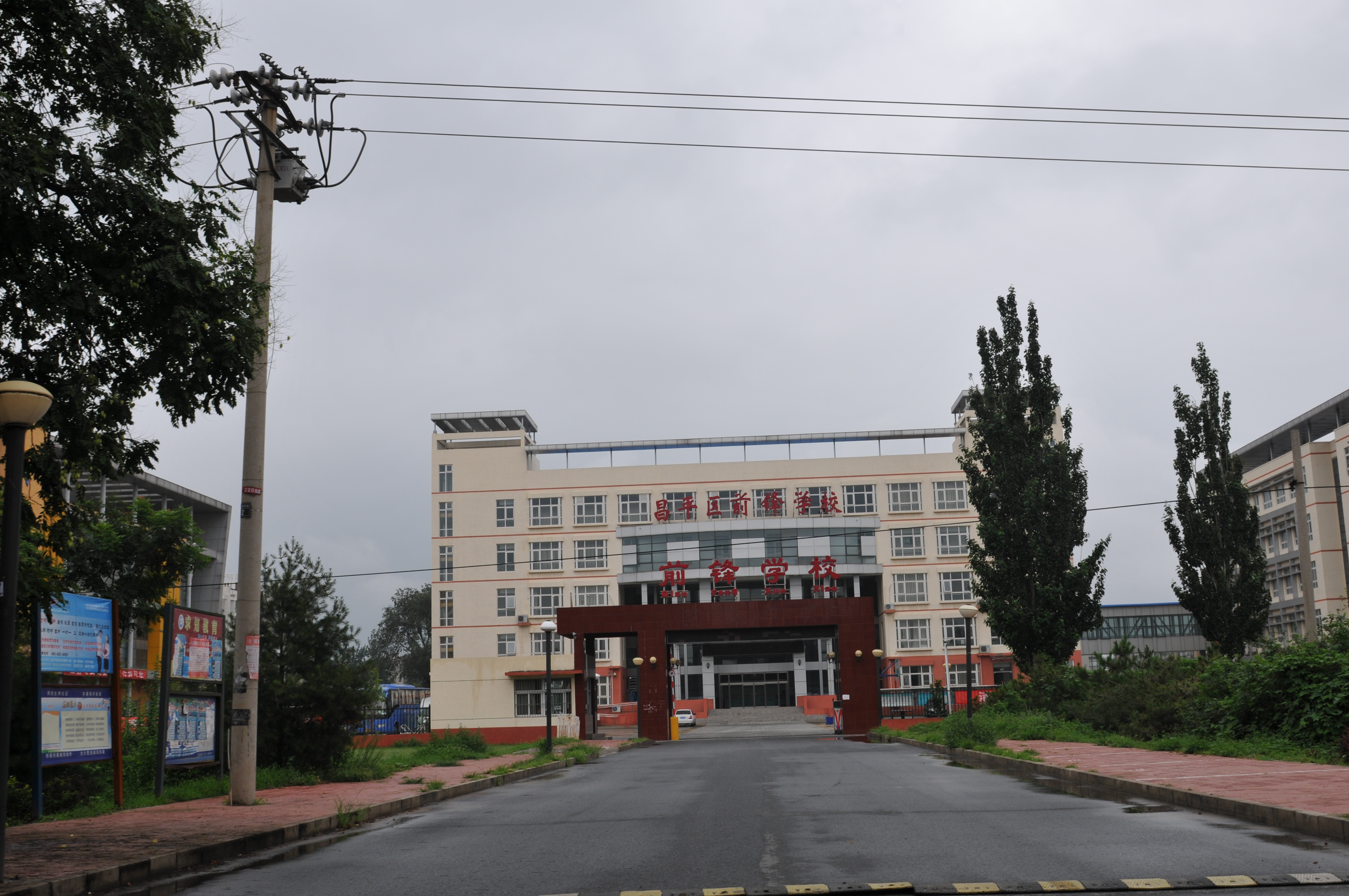
Qianfeng School within the subdistrict, 2011

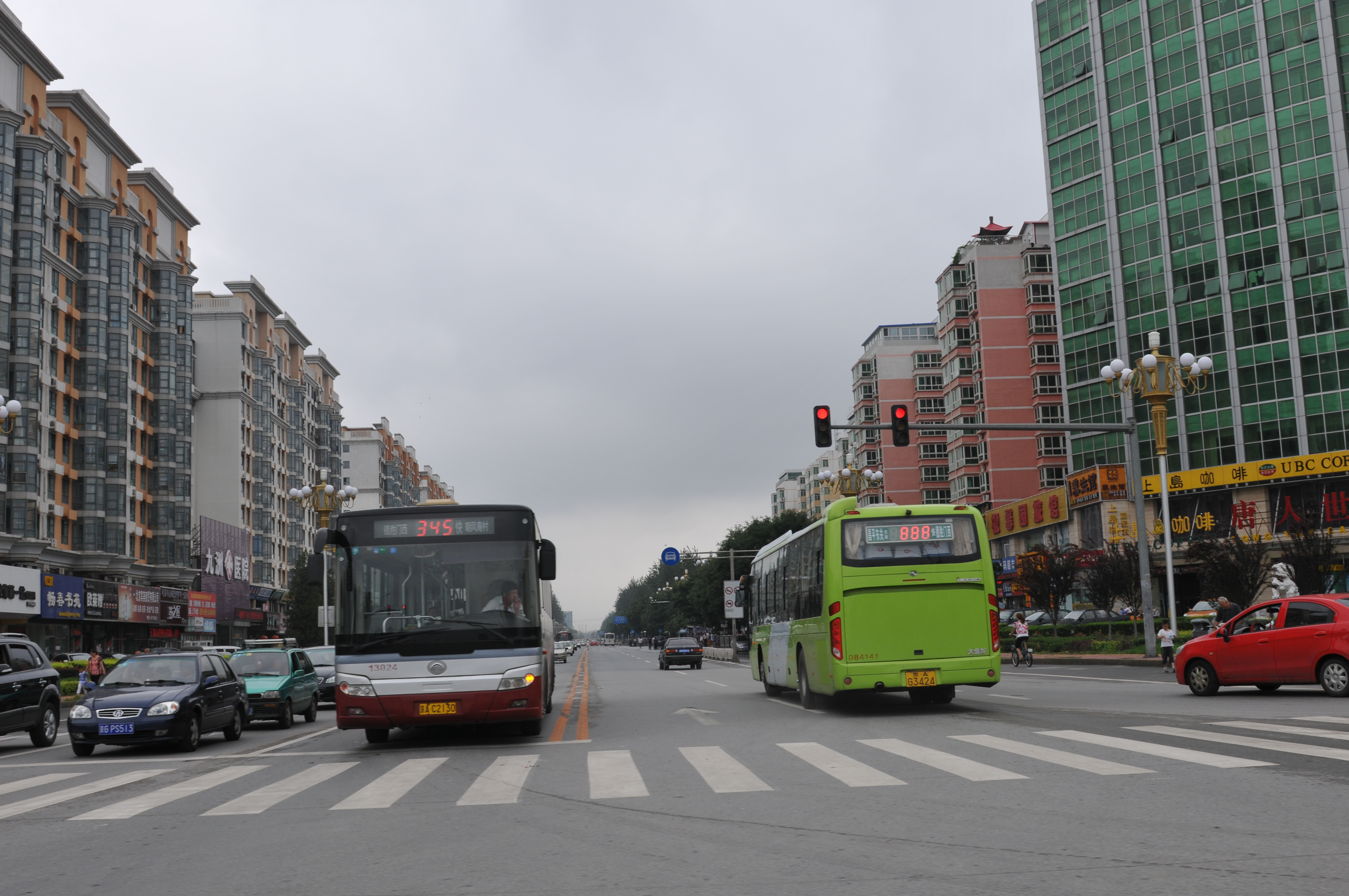
Shuiku Road within the subdistrict, 2011

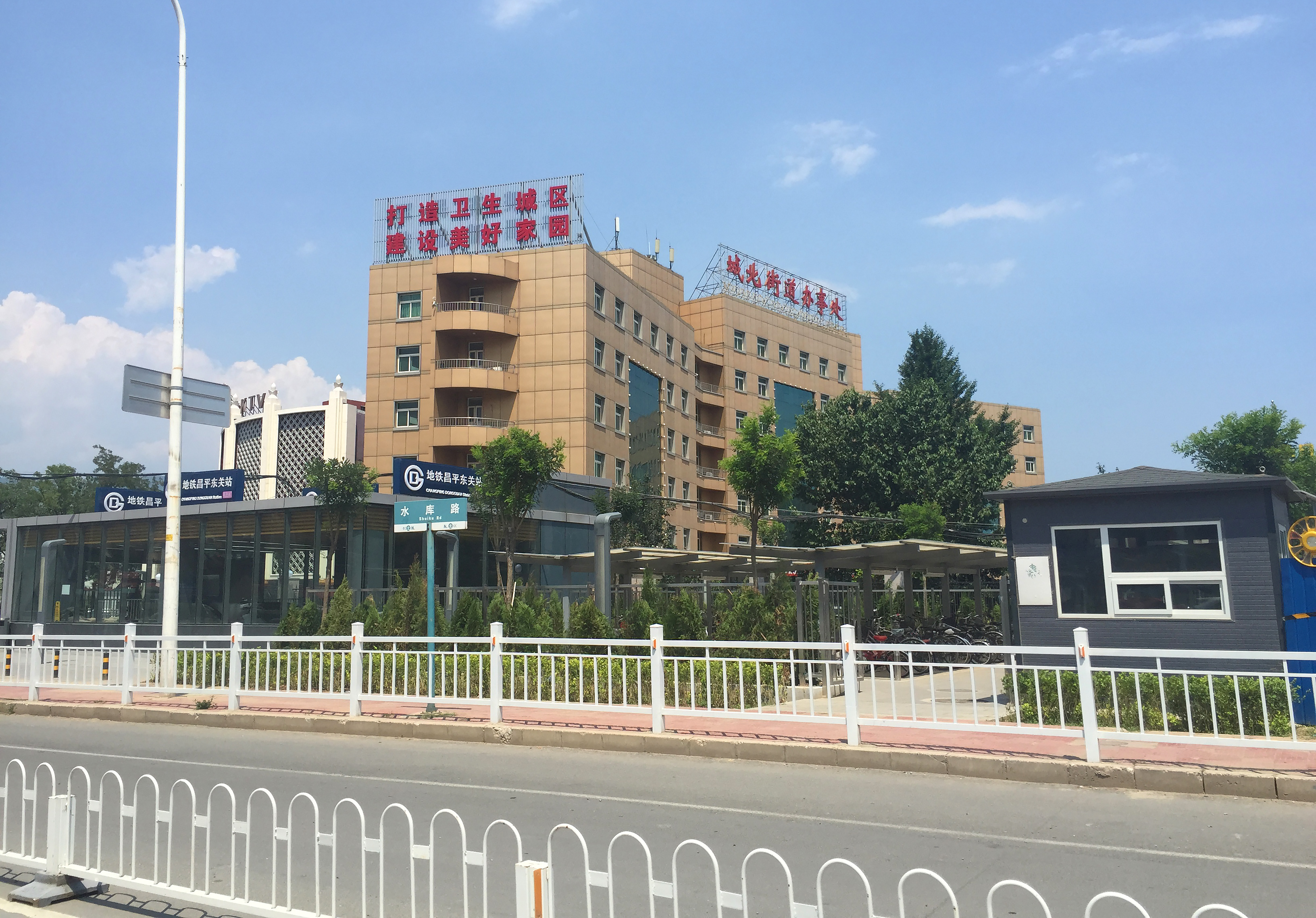
Subdistrict office building of Chengbei, 2016

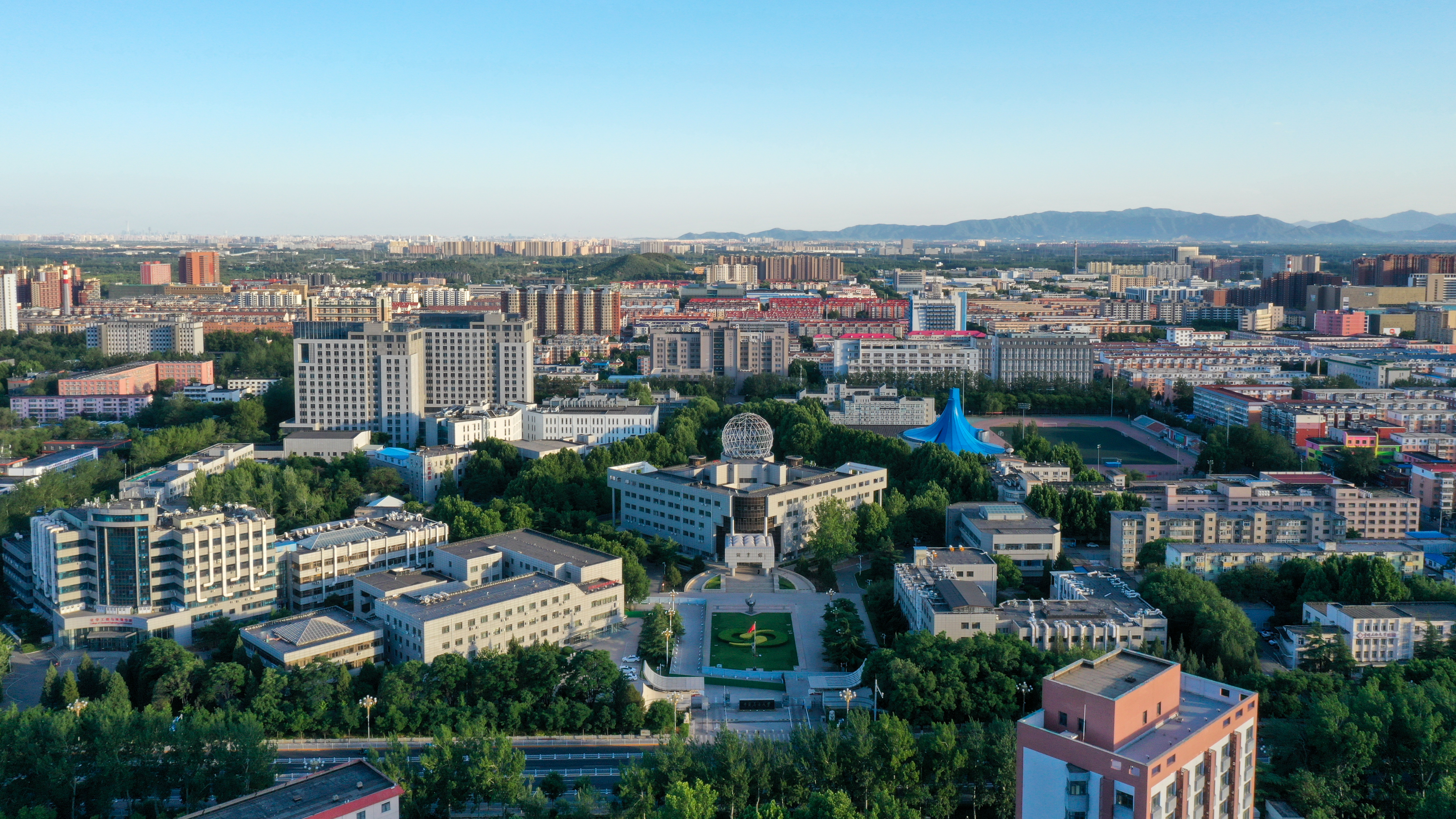
Campus of China University of Petroleum, 2022

== See also ==
- List of township-level divisions of Beijing
