= Cuicun =

Cuicun Town 崔村镇
- Town
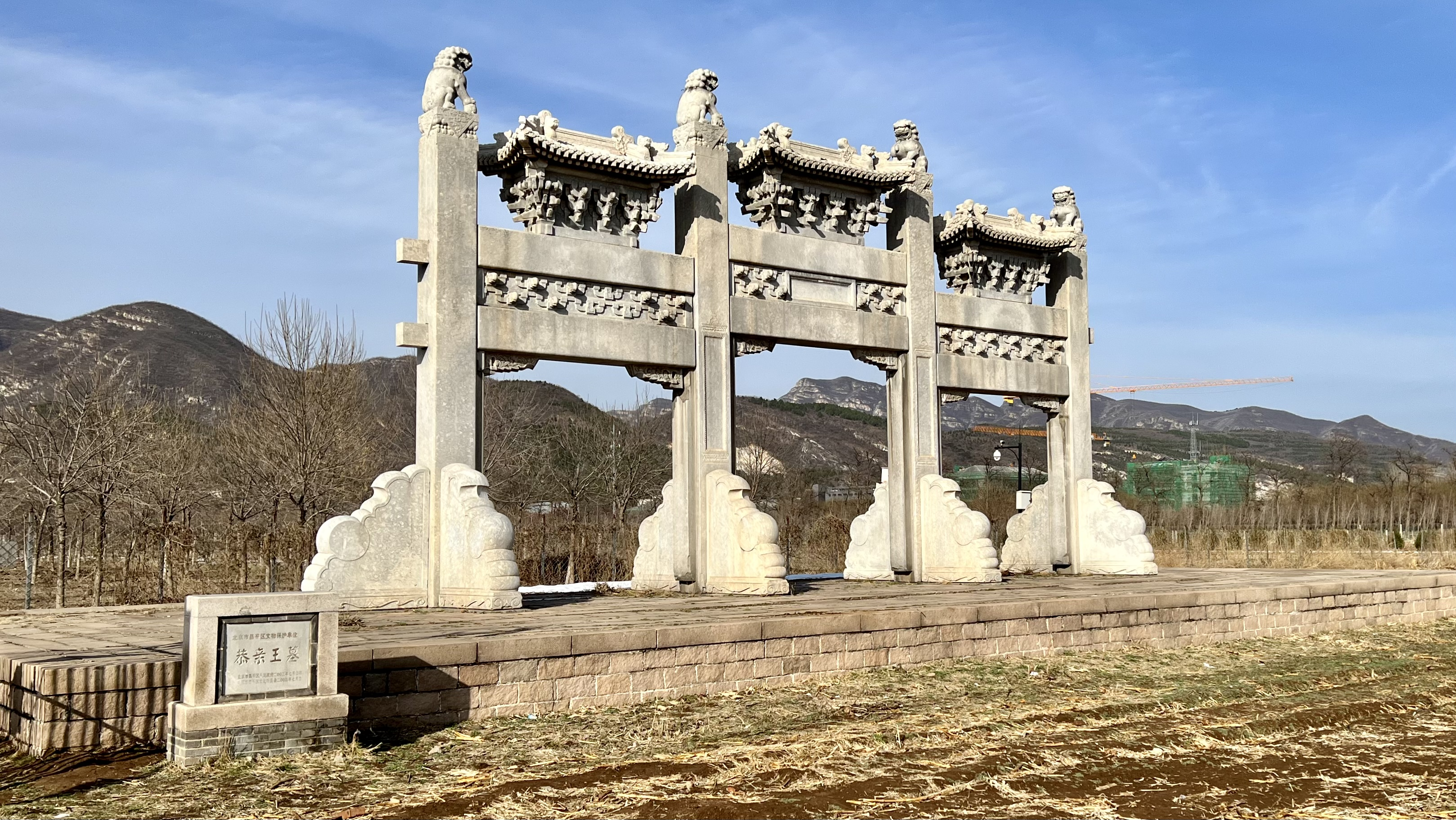
- Memorial Archway in Tomb of Prince Gong, 2022

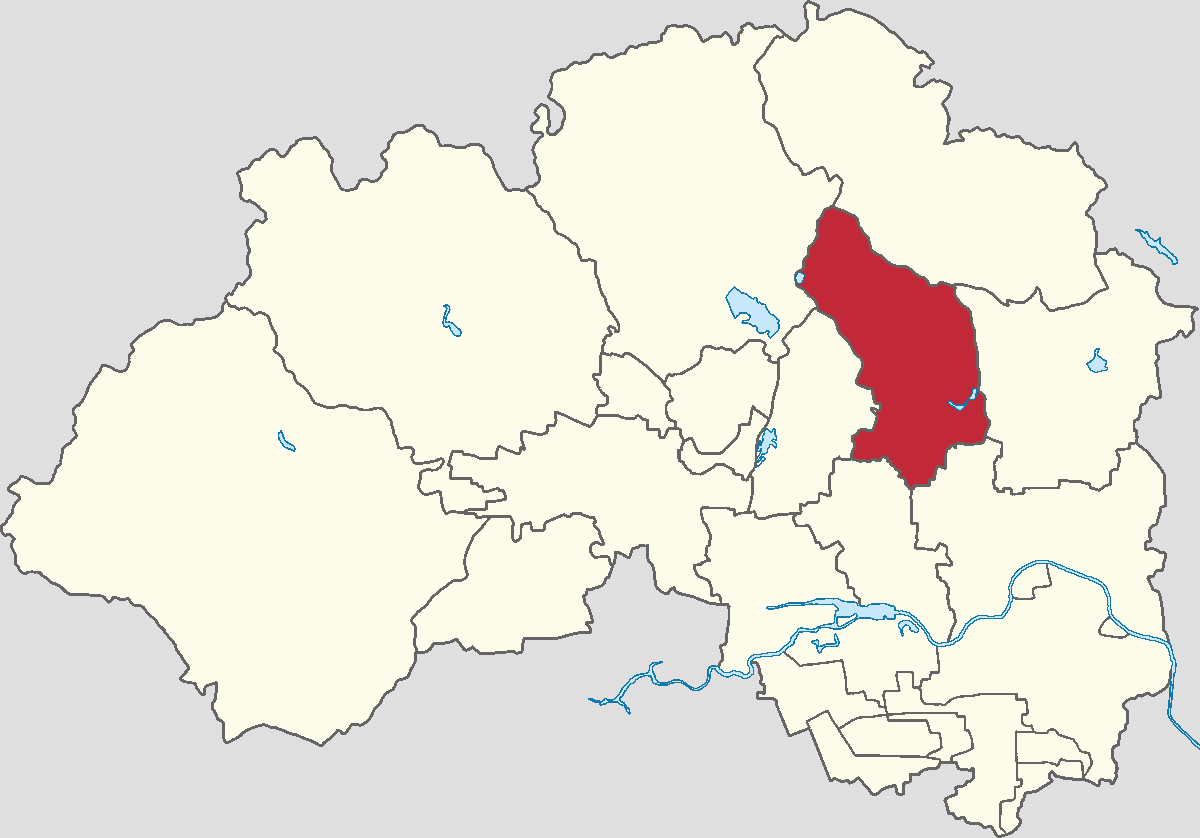
- Location in Changping District

- Location within Beijing Location within China
- Coordinates: 40°13′08″N 116°21′06″E
- Country: China
- Municipality: Beijing
- District: Changping
- Village-level Divisions: 12 villages

Area
  - Total: 62.26 km^{2} (24.04 sq mi)
- Elevation: 58 m (190 ft)

Population (2020)
  - Total: 24,630
  - Density: 395.6/km^{2} (1,025/sq mi)
- Time zone: UTC+8 (China Standard)
- Postal code: 102212
- Area code: 010

Cuicun Town (simplified Chinese: 崔村镇; traditional Chinese: 崔村鎮; pinyin: Cuīcūn Zhèn) is a town within Changping District, Beijing, China. Bounded by part of Taihang Mountain Range to its north, Cuicun borders Yanshou Town in its north, Xingshou Town in its east, Xiaotangshan and Baishan Towns in its south, as well as Nanshao and Shisanling Towns in its west. The result of the 2020 census indicated that the town was home to 24,630 inhabitants.

The name of this town literally translates to "Cui's Village", and it was given for the town government's location between the Dongcui and Xicui Villages.

== History ==
History of Cuicun Town
Year	Status	Belonged to
1947–1949	3rd District 4th District	Changshun County
1949–1956	3rd District 4th District	Changping County
1956–1958	Cuicun Township	Changping County
1958–1961	Cuicun Working Station of Xiaotangshan People's Commune	Changping County
1961–1982	Cuicun People's Commune (Merged with Nanzhuang Village in 1963)	Changping County
1982–1997	Cuicun Township	Changping County
1997–1999	Cuicun Town	Changping County
1999–present	Cuicun Town	Changping District

== Administrative divisions ==
By 2021, Cuicun Town had the following 12 villages under its administration:

Administrative division code	Subdivision names	Name transliteration
110114112201	西崔村	Xicuicun
110114112202	西辛峰村	Xixinfengcun
110114112203	大辛峰村	Daxinfengcun
110114112204	棉山村	Mianshancun
110114112205	南庄营村	Nanzhuangyingcun
110114112206	南庄村	Nanzhuangcun
110114112207	东崔村	Dongcuicun
110114112208	真顺村	Zhenshuncun
110114112209	麻峪村	Mayucun
110114112210	香堂村	Xiangtangcun
110114112211	西峪村	Xiyucun
110114112212	八家村	Bajiacun

== Gallery ==
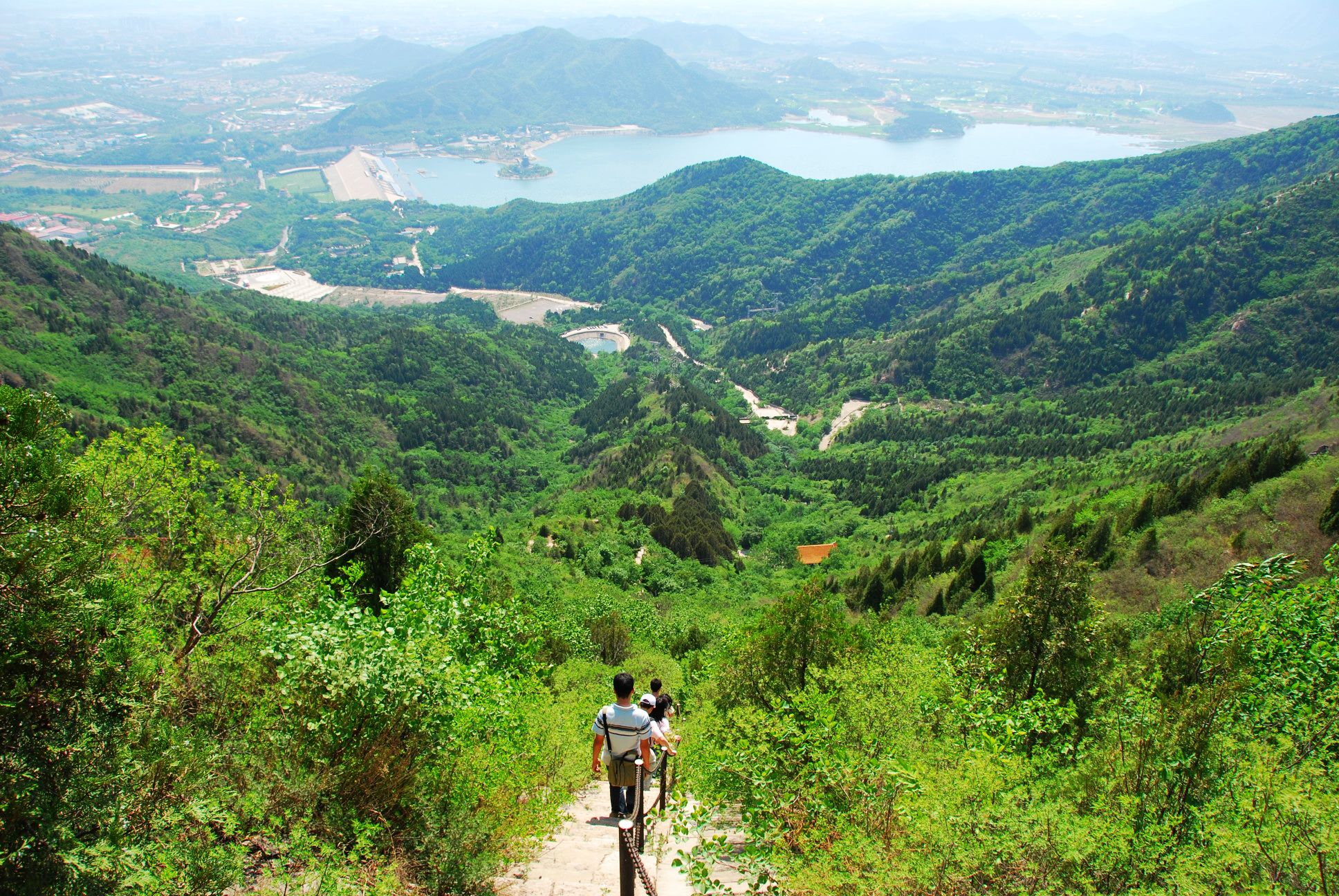
Mang Mountain Tourist Site northwest of the town, 2009

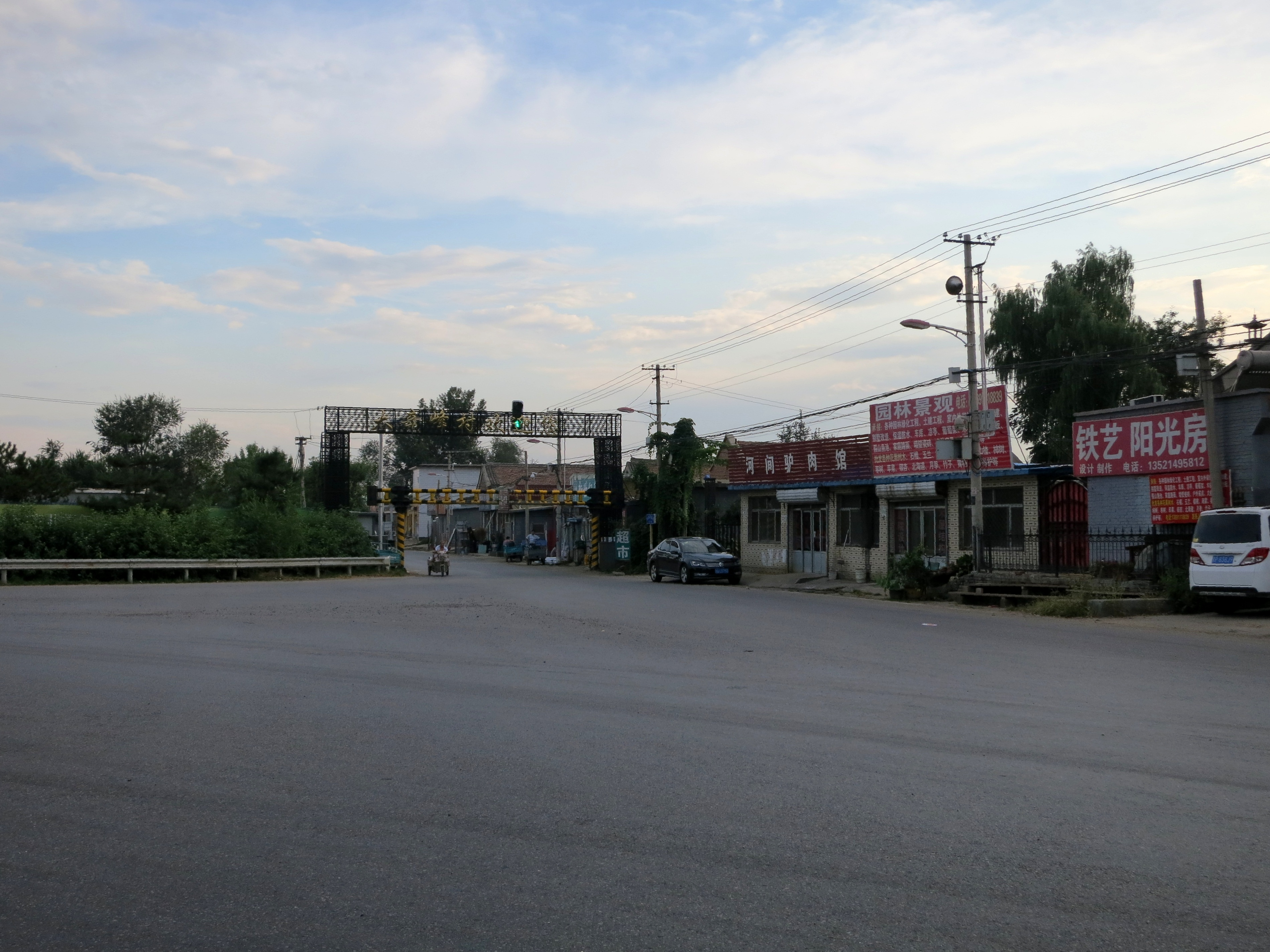
Entrance of Daxinfeng Village, 2015

== See also ==
- List of township-level divisions of Beijing
