= Holdings of American International Group =

Subsidiaries of the American International Group

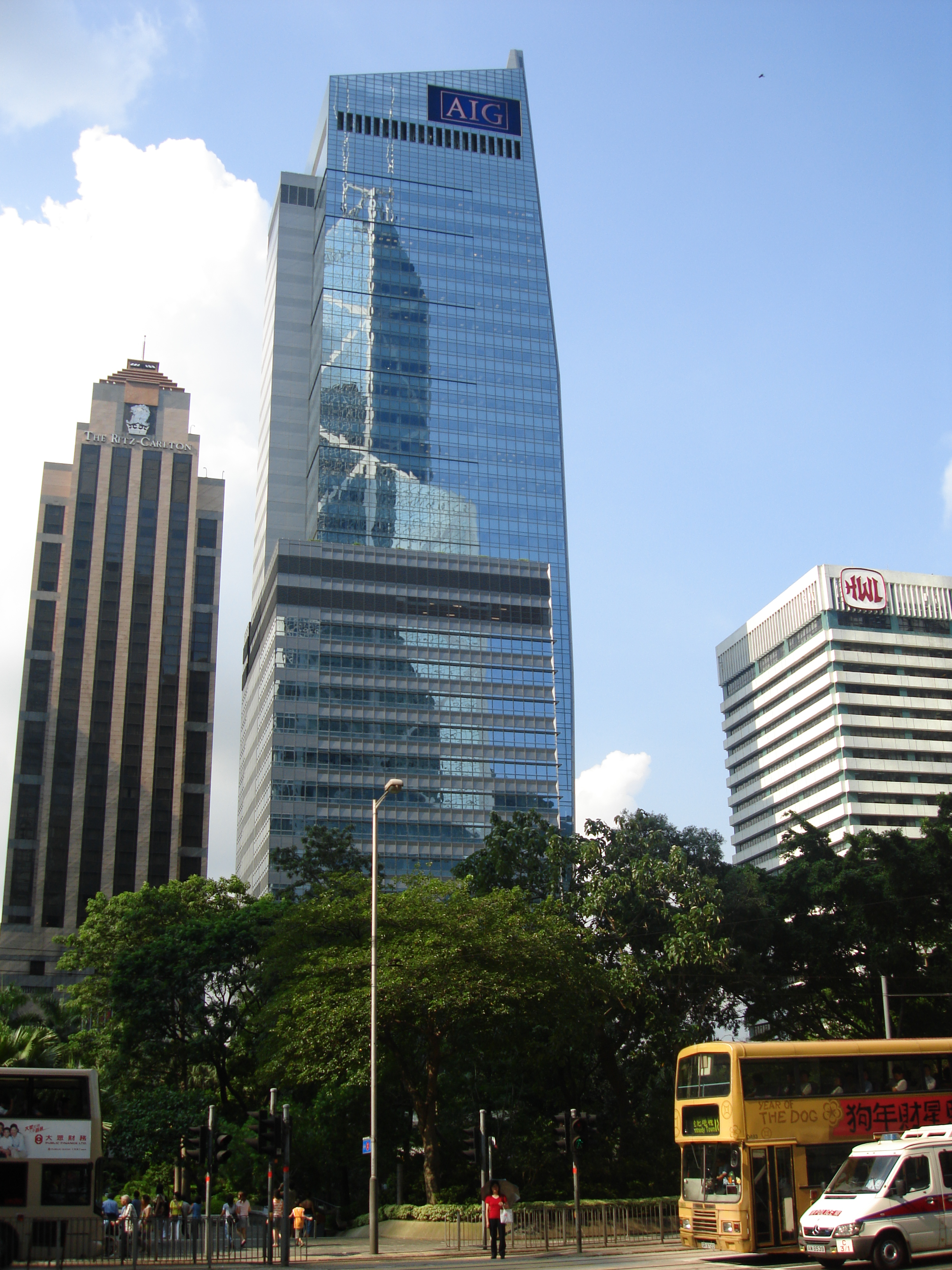
AIA Central in Hong Kong

The business of insurance conglomerate American International Group (AIG), operating in over 130 countries, consists of four core areas: General Insurance, Life Insurance & Retirement Services, Financial Services and Asset Management.

== International holdings ==
=== China ===
AIG owns 19.8% of People's Insurance Company of China (PICC) through direct and indirect holdings. PICC P&C is China's largest insurer of casualty insurance.

AIG owns a controlling share pack of Beijing Panam International Aviation Academy or BPIAA. BPIAA was established in 2004 as the largest privately owned flight training academy in China. Its bases located in Wuhai, Bautou, Shijajuan and Handan. In 2008, following the global crisis and economic recession, BPIAA has stopped its operation awaiting company re-purchase from other, more capable investors.

=== Japan ===
AIG's AIU Insurance unit has run a P&C insurance in the country since 1946, and is now the largest foreign nonlife insurer with 14,000 agents nationwide. In retail auto and L&H space, AIG owns American Home and Fuji Fire and Marine Insurance company. Since Jan 2018 AIU and FFM business units merged in AIG Sonpo.

=== Indonesia ===
AIU, which sells general insurance, operates in Indonesia.

=== Pakistan ===
AIG operates in Pakistan through the New Hampshire Insurance Company. The group's principal office is in Karachi and it has branch offices in Lahore, Islamabad, Faisalabad and Sialkot. AIG has been selling automobile insurance in Pakistan since 1949. In March 2010, New Hampshire Insurance became the first company in Pakistan to offer terrorism insurance, in collaboration with Allied Bank Ltd.

=== United Kingdom ===
AIG operates in the UK with the brands Chartis and Chartis Direct. It has about 3,000 employees, and sponsored the Manchester United football club, paying them the largest amount by a sponsor in history.

== Insurance holdings in the United States ==
=== California ===
AIG owns more than two dozen companies licensed to offer insurance in California, according to the California Insurance Commissioner. They include AIG Casualty Co.; AIG Centennial Insurance Co.; AIG Premier Insurance Co.; AIU Insurance Co.; American General Indemnity Co.; American Home Assurance Co.; American International Insurance Co. of California Inc.; Birmingham Fire Insurance Co. of Pennsylvania; Commerce And Industry Insurance Co.; GE Auto & Home Assurance Co.; GE Indemnity Insurance Co.; Granite State Insurance Co.; Hartford Steam Boiler Inspection and Insurance Co.; Insurance Co. of the State of Pennsylvania; Landmark Insurance Co.; National Union Fire Insurance Co. of Pittsburgh, Pa; New Hampshire Insurance Co.; Pacific Assurance; United Guaranty Commercial Insurance Co. of North Carolina; United Guaranty Credit Insurance Co.; United Guaranty Residential Insurance Co.; and Yosemite Insurance Co. It previously sold 21st Century Insurance, for $1.9 billion in 2009.

=== Pennsylvania ===
Twenty AIG subsidiaries are licensed to do business in Pennsylvania, including National Union Fire Insurance Co. in Pittsburgh, believed to be the second largest AIG underwriter in the nation. Other subsidiaries include New Hampshire Insurance, Insurance Company of the State of Pennsylvania, Granite State Insurance and New Hampshire Indemnity.

=== West Virginia ===
AIG writes property and casualty insurance, life and annuity, and workers' compensation insurance in West Virginia.

== Holdings ==
=== Aerospace ===
AIG owns International Lease Finance Corporation (ILFC), the world's largest aircraft leasing company, with hundreds of aircraft including the full range of Boeing and Airbus jetliners, as well as the McDonnell Douglas MD-11 and MD-80 Series. Total assets under lease are $55 billion as of June 30, 2008. Estimates of its value range from $5 billion to $14 billion based on a comparison with rivals.

=== Real estate ===
AIG/Lincoln was established in 1997 as a strategic partnership between AIG Global Real Estate Investment Corporation, New York, a subsidiary of AIG - American International Group, New York, and Lincoln Property Company, a Dallas based commercial real estate manager... It has developed or is currently developing over 2.2 million square meters of real estate in Poland, Hungary, Romania, Czech Republic, Germany, Italy, Spain, Switzerland, Austria and Russia.

=== Skiing ===
AIG owned Stowe Mountain Resort until February 2017. At the time of ownership, it was AIG's only ski business.

AIG's connection to Stowe started when C.V. Starr, the company's founder, invested in the resort in 1946. A $300m, 10 year expansion was started in 2005.

== Other holdings ==
AIG owns Ocean Finance, a British provider of home owner loans, mortgages and remortgages.

AIG was the principal sponsor of English football team Manchester United and the Japan Open Tennis Championships.

=== Subsidiary holdings ===
- AIG Advisor Group
- AIG American General Life Companies
- AIG UK Limited
- AIG Financial Products Corp., based in London, UK, registered in Delaware, US
  - Banque AIG, subsidiary of AIG Financial Products, based in Paris
- AIG Retirement
- Chartis, the property & casualty holdings
- International Lease Finance Corporation
- Lexington Insurance Company
  - FSC Securities Corporation
  - Royal Alliance
  - SagePoint Financial
- United Guaranty Corporation
- VALIC
  - AIG SunAmerica Life Assurance Company
  - The Variable Annuity Life Insurance Company
- Western National Life Insurance Company, formally AIG Annuity Insurance Company

== See also ==
- 2008 financial crisis
- Bailout (finance)
- Lemon socialism
- List of United States insurance companies
