= 2011 ATP China Challenger International =

- Date: 25–31 July
- Edition: 1st
- Surface: Hard
- Location: Wuhai, China

Champions

Singles
- (Japan) Go Soeda

Doubles
- (Chinese Taipei) Lee Hsin-han / (Chinese Taipei) Yang Tsung-hua
ATP China Challenger International	· 2012 →

The 2011 ATP China Challenger International was a professional tennis tournament played on hard courts. It was the first edition of the tournament which was part of the 2011 ATP Challenger Tour. It took place in Wuhai, China, between 25 and 31 July 2011.

== ATP entrants ==
=== Seeds ===
Country	Player	Rank^{1}	Seed
JPN	Go Soeda	136	1
ESP	Guillermo Olaso	167	2
ISR	Amir Weintraub	215	3
THA	Danai Udomchoke	216	4
FRA	Guillaume Rufin	227	5
SVK	Marek Semjan	250	6
SWE	Michael Ryderstedt	258	7
USA	Nicholas Monroe	281	8

- ^{1} Rankings are as of July 18, 2011.

=== Other entrants ===
The following players received wildcards into the singles main draw:

- (China) Wang Chuhan
- (China) Li Dawei
- (China) Ma Yanan
- (China) Lu Yang

The following players received entry from the qualifying draw:

- (South Korea) An Jae-sung
- (Chinese Taipei) Lee Hsin-han
- (Japan) Kento Takeuchi
- (Thailand) Kittipong Wachiramanowong

The following players received entry from the qualifying draw as a lucky loser:

- (China) Gao Peng

== Champions ==
=== Singles ===
(Japan) Go Soeda def. (South Africa) Raven Klaasen, 7–5, 6–4

=== Doubles ===
(Chinese Taipei) Lee Hsin-han / (Chinese Taipei) Yang Tsung-hua def. (China) Feng He / (China) Zhang Ze, 6–2, 7–6^{(7–4)}
