= Wuhai Yellow River Road Bridge =

Bridge in Wuhai, Inner Mongolia, China

External image
- View of the bridge
- Coordinates: 39.504°N 106.746°E
- Carries: G110
- Begins: Erdaokan, Bayintaohai Town, Hainan District
- Ends: Bayinsai Street, Wuda District

Characteristics
- Total length: 1,130 metres (3,710 ft)
- Width: 33.5 metres (110 ft)
- No. of lanes: 6

The Wuhai Yellow River Road Bridge is located in Wuhai, Inner Mongolia. The cable-stayed bridge's main span length is 760 m (2,490 ft); The total spanned length is 1,130 m (3,710 ft). As of 2022 it is the bridge over the Yellow River with the largest single structure span. Each of the bridge's tower is 50 m (160 ft) tall.

Construction by the Inner Mongolia Highway Construction and Development Co. started in March 2013 at a cost of 1.08 billion RMB. In June 2018 the main span was closed. The bridge opened on 2018.

== Old bridge ==
At the same location a bridge has been present since 1988. The original Wuhai Yellow River Bridge opened for traffic in September 1988. The total length spanned 530.6 m (1,741 ft).

In November 2016 the Wuhai Lake Bridge opened nearby. On 7 January 2017 the bridge was decommissioned to be demolished, as it could not carry contemporary heavy loads. Traffic was routed over the Wuhai Lake Bridge until the new bridge opened.
