= G1817 Wuhai–Yinchuan Expressway =

Road in China

Wuhai–Yinchuan Expressway
- 乌海－银川高速公路
- Wuyin Expressway 乌银高速公路

Route information
- Auxiliary route of G18

Major junctions
- North end: G6 in Hainan District, Wuhai, Inner Mongolia
- South end: G1816 in Yongning County, Yinchuan, Ningxia

Location
- Country: China

Highway system
- National Trunk Highway System; Primary; Auxiliary; National Highways; Transport in China
← G1816	→ G1818

The G1817 Wuhai–Yinchuan Expressway (Chinese: 乌海—银川高速公路), also referred to as the Wuyin Expressway (Chinese: 乌银高速公路), is an expressway in China that connects Wuhai, Inner Mongolia to Yinchuan, Ningxia.

Currently the section from Bayinhutug to Bayanhot is under construction following the route of Provincial Highway S314, while the remaining sections have been opened to traffic.
