= You Prefecture (Inner Mongolia) =

Historical administrative division in Inner Mongolia, China

- Chinese: 宥州
- Literal meaning: Assistance Prefecture
Transcriptions
Standard Mandarin
- Hanyu Pinyin: Yòuzhōu
- Wade–Giles: Yu Chou

You Prefecture or Youzhou (Chinese: Yòuzhōu 宥州; Tangut: 𗍃𗉔) was a prefecture (zhou) of imperial China in what is now southern Inner Mongolia. It existed intermittently from 738 until the early 13th century.

== History ==
You Prefecture was briefly occupied by the Tibetan Empire in the 9th century. From the 10th to 12th centuries, it was mostly controlled by the Tanguts as part of the Dingnan Jiedushi or the Western Xia. The Western Xia were destroyed by the Mongolian Empire in 1227.

== Geography ==
The administrative region of Youzhou during the Tang dynasty is in modern southern Inner Mongolia. It probably includes parts of modern:

- Under the administration of Ordos City:
  - Otog Banner
  - Otog Front Banner
- Under the administration of Wuhai:
  - Wuhai

== See also ==
- You Prefecture in Beijing
