= 2012 ATP China Challenger International – Singles =

Singles
- 2012 ATP China Challenger International

Final
- Champion: (Slovenia) Aljaž Bedene
- Runner-up: (France) Josselin Ouanna
- Score: 6–3, 4–6, 6–3

Events
Singles	Doubles
← 2011 ·	ATP China Challenger International	· 2013 →

Aljaž Bedene won the title, defeating Josselin Ouanna 6–3, 4–6, 6–3 in the final.

== Seeds ==
1. (Slovenia) Aljaž Bedene (champion)
2. (Slovenia) Grega Žemlja (first round, retired due to heat stroke)
3. (Japan) Yuichi Sugita (first round)
4. (Chinese Taipei) Yang Tsung-hua (second round)
5. (China) Zhang Ze (quarterfinals)
6. (France) Josselin Ouanna (final)
7. (Japan) Hiroki Moriya (second round)
8. (France) Laurent Rochette (quarterfinals)

== Draw ==
=== Key ===
- Q = Qualifier
- WC = Wild card
- LL = Lucky loser
- Alt = Alternate
- SE = Special exempt
- PR = Protected ranking
- ITF = ITF entry
- JE = Junior exempt
- w/o = Walkover
- r = Retired
- d = Defaulted
- SR = Special ranking

=== Finals ===
Semifinals
1	(Slovenia) Aljaž Bedene	6	6
Q	(Australia) Adam Feeney	1	4
6	(France) Josselin Ouanna	7^{7}	3	6
(Chinese Taipei) Chen Ti	6^{1}	6	1

Final
1	(Slovenia) Aljaž Bedene	6	4	6
6	(France) Josselin Ouanna	3	6	3

=== Top half ===
First round
1	(Slovenia) A Bedene	3	7^{8}	6
(China) Chang Yu	6	6^{6}	0
WC	(China) Ouyang Bowen	4	2
(Egypt) M Safwat	6	6
(France) V Millot	3	6	2
Q	(Austria) N Moser	6	1	0^{r}
WC	(China) Wang Chuhan	0	0^{r}
7	(Japan) Hiroki Moriya	6	3
3	(Japan) Y Sugita	4	4
Q	(Australia) A Feeney	6	6
(China) Y Bai	0	4
(South Korea) Y-K Lim	6	6
(Japan) H Kondo	6	3	6
WC	(China) Ning Yuqing	3	6	0
(Japan) Junn Mitsuhashi	6^{4}	6	1
8	(France) Laurent Rochette	7^{7}	3	6

Second round
1	(Slovenia) A Bedene	6	6
(Egypt) M Safwat	4	2
(France) V Millot	6	6
7	(Japan) Hiroki Moriya	3	4
Q	(Australia) A Feeney	7^{8}	3	6
(South Korea) Y-K Lim	6^{6}	6	3
(Japan) H Kondo	3	1
8	(France) Laurent Rochette	6	6

Quarterfinals
1	(Slovenia) A Bedene	6	6
(France) V Millot	3	2
Q	(Australia) A Feeney	7^{7}	6
8	(France) Laurent Rochette	6^{5}	0

Semifinals
1	(Slovenia) A Bedene	6	6
Q	(Australia) A Feeney	1	4

=== Bottom half ===
First round
6	(France) J Ouanna	6	6
(South Africa) R Roelofse	1	2
WC	(China) Y-N Ma	5	6^{2}
(France) P-H Herbert	7	7^{7}
(India) Jeevan Nedunchezhiyan	3	0
(Monaco) B Balleret	6	6
(Japan) Kento Takeuchi	7	1	3
4	(Chinese Taipei) T-h Yang	5	6	6
5	(China) Z Zhang	6	3	6
(India) Vijayant Malik	3	6	2
Q	(Australia) Matthew Barton	6	4	1
Q	(Australia) L Saville	1	6	6
(Australia) S Groth	4	3^{r}
(Chinese Taipei) L-c Huang	6	4
(Chinese Taipei) T Chen	4	7	0
2	(Slovenia) G Žemlja	6	5	^{r}

Second round
6	(France) J Ouanna	6	7
(France) P-H Herbert	4	5
(Monaco) B Balleret	7	6
4	(Chinese Taipei) T-h Yang	5	4
5	(China) Z Zhang	6	6
Q	(Australia) L Saville	4	4
(Chinese Taipei) L-c Huang	6^{2}	3
(Chinese Taipei) T Chen	7^{7}	6

Quarterfinals
6	(France) J Ouanna	2
(Monaco) B Balleret	0^{r}
5	(China) Z Zhang	6	6^{7}	3
(Chinese Taipei) T Chen	3	7^{9}	6

Semifinals
6	(France) J Ouanna	7^{7}	3	6
(Chinese Taipei) T Chen	6^{1}	6	1
