= Uda District =

Uda District may refer to:

- Uda District, Nara, Japan
- Uda District, Iwaki of Iwaki Province, Japan, during the Nara period
- Wuda District, Wuhai, Inner Mongolia, China (sometimes called Uda District)
