= Otog Banner =

Otog Banner 鄂托克旗 • ᠣᠲᠣᠭ ᠬᠣᠰᠢᠭᠤ
- Banner
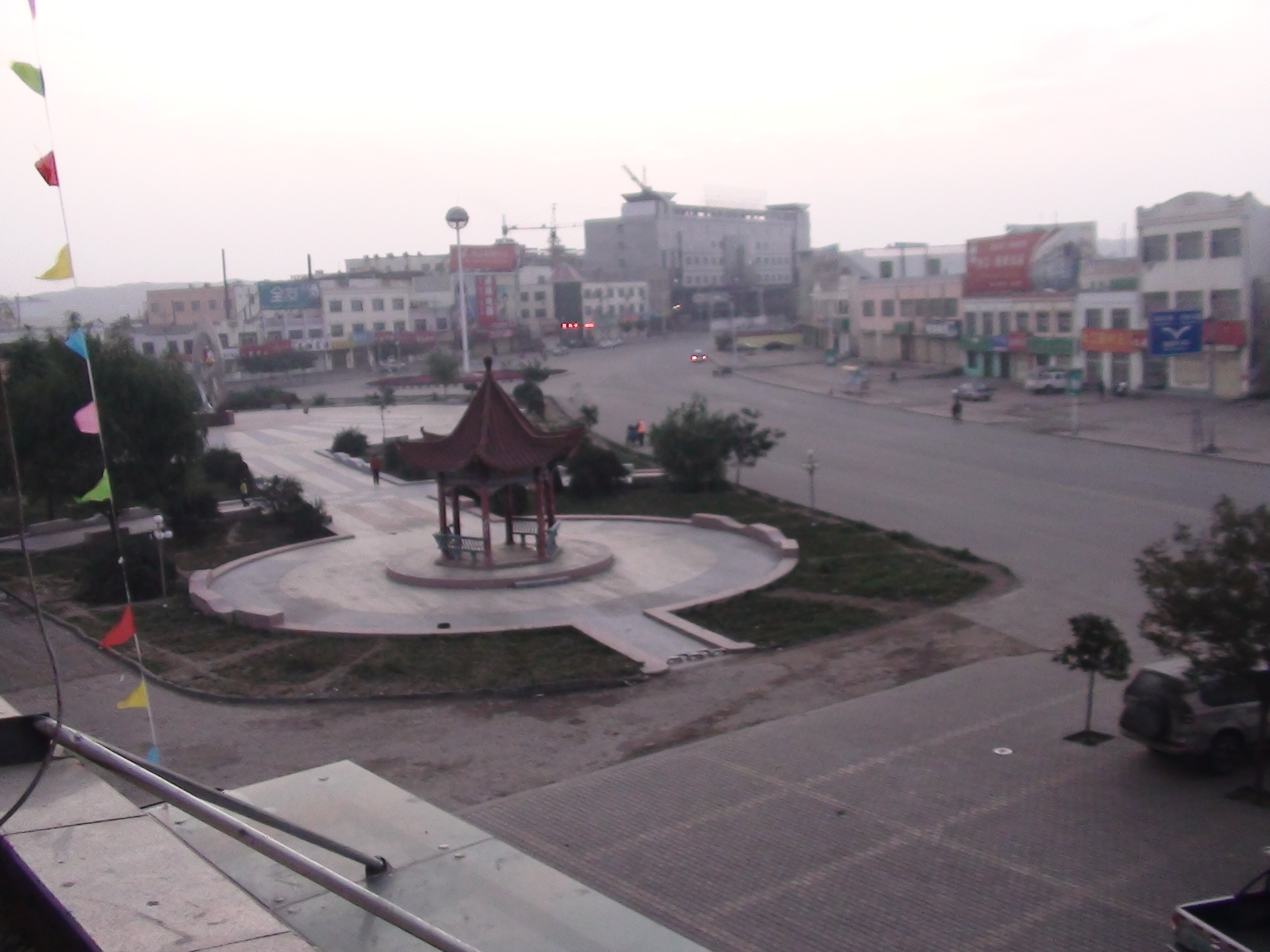
- A public square in Qipanjing

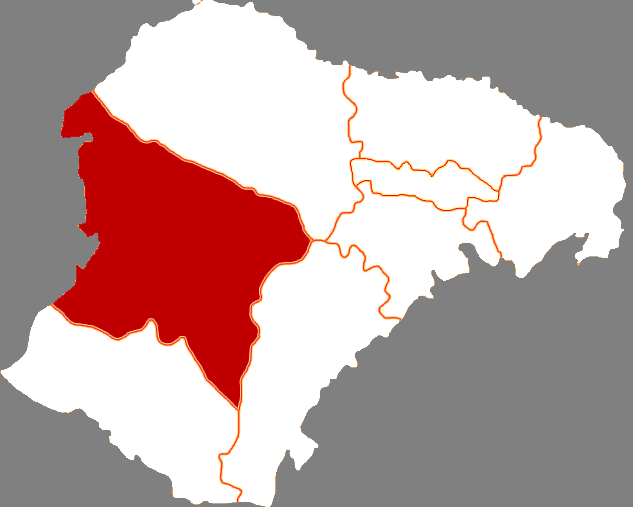
- Otog in Ordos City

- Ordos City in Inner Mongolia

- Location of the seat in Inner Mongolia Otog (China)
- Coordinates: 39°05′23″N 107°58′34″E
- Country: China
- Autonomous region: Inner Mongolia
- Prefecture-level city: Ordos
- Banner seat: Ulan

Area
  - Total: 20,064 km^{2} (7,747 sq mi)
- Elevation: 1,367 m (4,485 ft)

Population (2020)
  - Total: 162,726
  - Density: 8.1103/km^{2} (21.006/sq mi)
- Time zone: UTC+8 (China Standard)
- Website: www.eq.gov.cn

Otog Banner

Chinese name
- Chinese: 鄂托克旗
Transcriptions
Standard Mandarin
- Hanyu Pinyin: Ètuōkè Qí

Mongolian name
- Mongolian Cyrillic: Отог хошуу
- Mongolian script: ᠣᠲᠣᠭ ᠬᠣᠰᠢᠭᠤ
Transcriptions
- SASM/GNC: Otoɣ qosiɣu

Otog Banner (Mongolian: ᠣᠲᠣᠭ ᠬᠣᠰᠢᠭᠤ; Chinese: 鄂托克旗) is a banner of southwestern Inner Mongolia, China. It is under the administration of Ordos City, and borders Otog Front Banner to the southwest and Uxin Banner to the southeast.

== History ==
Evidence of human habitation in present-day Otog Banner dates back to the Neolithic era, when the area was inhabited by the Hetao people (Chinese: 河套人; pinyin: Hétào rén).

According to the banner's government, the area was ruled over by the Shang Dynasty during its existence. During this time, the area was inhabited by the Tufang, the Guifang, and other fang-countries, in addition to the Northern Qiang and Xunyu nomads.

During the Western Zhou period of the Zhou dynasty, the area around Otog Banner was home to nomadic tribes such as Xianyun, who were part of the Beidi. During the Spring and Autumn period, the Quyan and other nomadic tribes lived on the southwestern edge of present-day Otog Banner. During the Warring States period, the Linhu and the Loufan lived in the area.

Following the Zhou dynasty, the area was inhabited by the Xiongnu.

In 215 BCE, the area was incorporated into the Qin dynasty as part of Beidi Commandery. The area was reorganized in 127 BCE as part of Shuofang Commandery, with present-day Otog Banner occupying its subdivisions of Linrong County and Xiudu County. In 50 CE, the southern Xiongnu and other tribes occupied the area, and present-day Otog Banner fell under the jurisdiction of Xiongnu Right Tuqi-prince.

During the Jin Dynasty and the Sixteen Kingdoms period, the area belonged to both the Former Zhao and Later Zhao. During this time, the area was administered as Shuozhou.

In 407 CE, Helian Bobo established the Great Xia, which administered present-day Otog Banner. In 427 CE, the Northern Wei dynasty occupied the entirety of present-day Ordos, and administered the area of present-day Otog Banner as Xi'an Prefecture.

From 605 CE to 607 CE, the area was administered under Lingwu Commandery and Yanchuan Commandery.

By the beginning of the Tang dynasty, the area was split between six Turkic prefectures: Lu Prefecture, Li Prefecture (Chinese: 丽州; pinyin: Lì Zhōu), She Prefecture (Chinese: 舍州; pinyin: Shě Zhōu), Sai Prefecture (Chinese: 塞州; pinyin: Sāi Zhōu), Yi Prefecture, and Qi Prefecture. It was later reorganized as Kuang Prefecture and Chang Prefecture.

In the 738 CE, the Tang dynasty took control, and organized the area under the You Prefecture, with present-day Otog Banner belonging to its subdivisions of Yan'en County (Chinese: 延恩县; pinyin: Yán'ēn Xiàn), Guiren County (Chinese: 归仁县; pinyin: Guīrén Xiàn), and Huaide County (Chinese: 怀德三县; pinyin: Huáidé Xiàn).

During the Five Dynasties and Ten Kingdoms period which followed the Tang dynasty, the area belonged to Dingnan Jiedushi and Lingwu Jiedushi.

In 1038, the area of present-day Otog Banner became part of the Western Xia.

In 1226, Genghis Khan personally conquered the Western Xia, and rested his troops in the western portion of present-day Otog Banner. The following year, when the Western Xia was destroyed, the area became part of the Mongol Empire.

In the Yuan Dynasty, all but the western portion of the area belonged to Ningxiafu Circuit, while the rest became the fiefdom of Chaghan Nur (Chinese: 察罕脑尔; pinyin: Cháhǎn Nǎo'ěr).

In 1376, present-day Otog Banner was put under control of Ningxia Wei and Dongsheng Wei, as part of the Shaanxi Provincial Command and Envoy Division of the Ming dynasty. In 1462, Mongols resettled in Ordos, and in 1500, Dayan Khan restored the Wanhu organization, bringing the area under the control of Bars Bolud Jinong. The area would continue to be ruled by his descendants, including Baisanggu'er. The Ming dynasty retook control of the area in 1635, following Mongol surrender.

The Qing dynasty assumed control of the area in 1649, and re-organized the area of present-day Ordos under six different banners. The area near present-day Otog Banner was governed by the descendants of Baisanggu'er as part of the Ordos Right Middle Banner.

The Ordos Right Wing Middle Banner survived into the Republic of China, although it underwent various administrative changes: in 1930, Woye County (Chinese: 沃野县; pinyin: Wòyě Xiàn) was established within the banner, and the banner's yamen was abolished in 1936. The Taolimin Office took over the area in 1941, amid the Japanese invasion of China, but by 1942, the area was torn between three different governing systems.

On August 23, 1949, the People's Liberation Army took control of present-day Otog Banner, and by September 7, a provisional Communist Party government was established. Otog Banner was established in February 1950. In 1980, Otog Front Banner was split from Otog Banner, and in 1997, part of Otog Banner was transferred to Wuhai.

== Administrative divisions ==
Otog Banner is made up of 4 towns and 2 sums.

Name	Simplified Chinese	Hanyu Pinyin	Mongolian (Hudum Script)	Mongolian (Cyrillic)	Administrative division code
Towns
Ulan	乌兰镇	Wūlán Zhèn	ᠤᠯᠠᠭᠠᠨ ᠪᠠᠯᠭᠠᠰᠤ	Улаан балгас	150624100
Qipanjing	棋盘井镇	Qípánjǐng Zhèn	ᠴᠢ ᠫᠠᠨ ᠵᠢᠩ ᠪᠠᠯᠭᠠᠰᠤ	Чи пан жин балгас	150624101
Mengxi	蒙西镇	Méngxī Zhèn	ᠮᠧᠩ ᠰᠢ ᠪᠠᠯᠭᠠᠰᠤ	Мэн ший балгас	150624102
Muhi Nur	木凯淖尔镇	Mùkǎinào'ěr Zhèn	ᠦᠯᠡᠬᠡᠢᠨᠠᠭᠤᠷ ᠪᠠᠯᠭᠠᠰᠤ	Үлхийнуур балгас	150624103
Sums
Sumet Sum	苏米图苏木	Sūmǐtú Sūmù	ᠰᠦᠮᠡᠲᠦ ᠰᠤᠮᠤ	Сүмт сум	150624200
Arbas Sum	阿尔巴斯苏木	Ā'ěrbāsī Sūmù	ᠠᠷᠪᠠᠰ ᠰᠤᠮᠤ	Арвас сум	150624201
Other Township-level divisions
Inner Mongolia Otog Economic Development Zone	内蒙古鄂托克经济开发区	Nèiménggǔ Ètuōkè Jīngjì Kāifā Qū	ᠥᠪᠥᠷ ᠮᠣᠩᠭᠣᠯ ᠤᠨ ᠣᠲᠣᠭ ᠠᠵᠤ ᠠᠬᠤᠢ ᠶᠢᠨ ᠨᠡᠭᠡᠭᠡᠯᠲᠡ ᠶᠢᠨ ᠲᠣᠭᠣᠷᠢᠭ		150624404

== Geography and climate ==
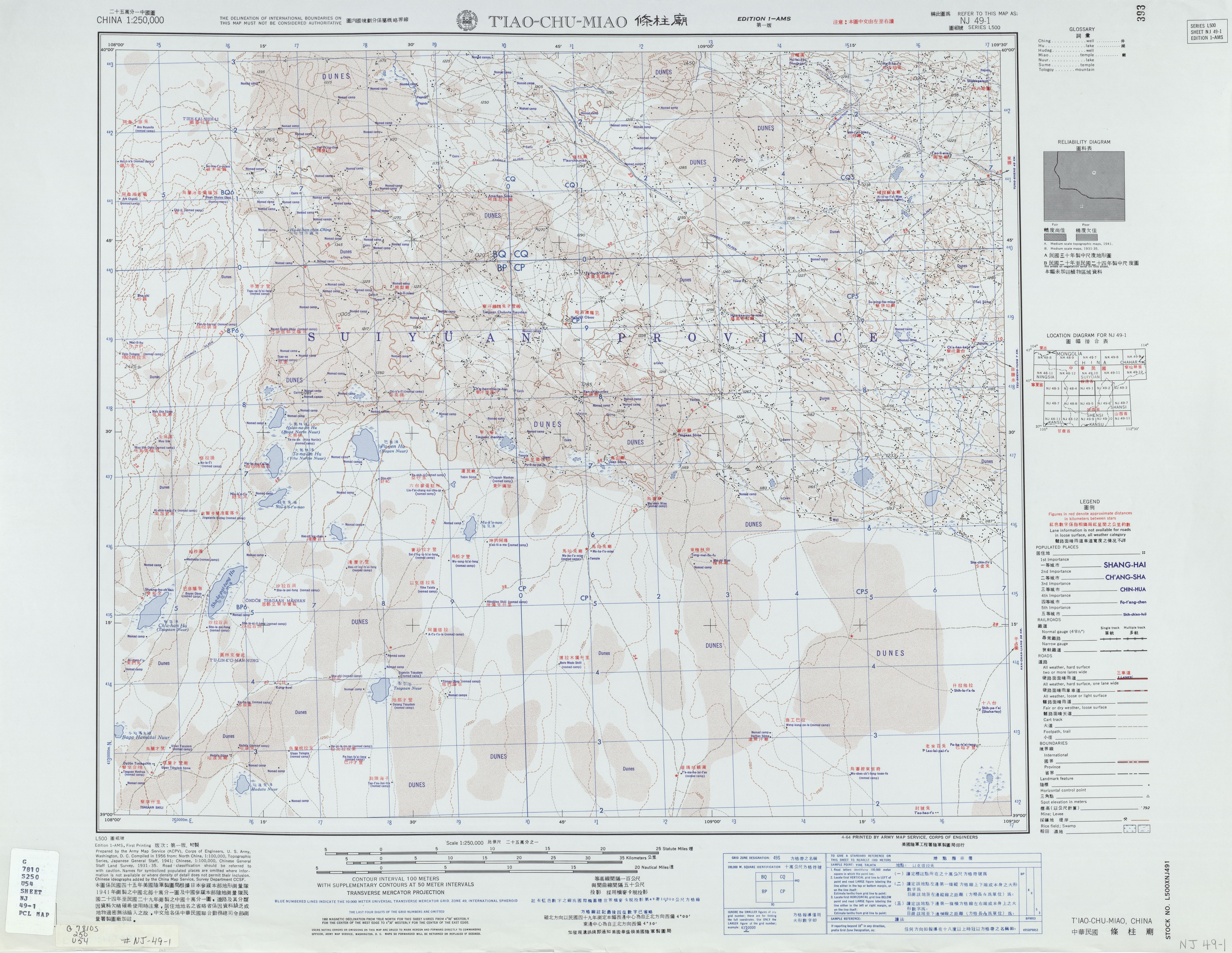
Map including modern-day Otog Banner area (AMS, 1956)

Otog Banner is located in the southwest of Inner Mongolia and the west of Ordos City's administration, with a latitude range of 38° 18' to 40° 11' N and a longitude range of 106° 41' to 108° 54', spanning 209 kilometres (130 mi) north to south and 188 kilometres (117 mi) west to east. Its total area is 20,064 square kilometres (7,747 sq mi).

Otog Banner has a monsoon-influenced, continental cold desert climate (Köppen BWk), with long, cold and very dry winters, and hot, slightly wetter summers. The monthly daily average temperature ranges from −9.6 °C (14.7 °F) in January to 22.9 °C (73.2 °F) in July, and the annual mean is 7.5 °C (45.5 °F). Only during the summer months does significant rainfall occur, and there is an average of 264.4 millimetres (10.41 in) of precipitation annually. There are 3,000 hours of sunshine and 122 frost-free days per year.

Climate data for Otog Banner, elevation 1,381 m (4,531 ft), (1991–2020 normals, extremes 1971–2010)
Month	Jan	Feb	Mar	Apr	May	Jun	Jul	Aug	Sep	Oct	Nov	Dec	Year
Record high °C (°F)	13.6 (56.5)	16.6 (61.9)	26.3 (79.3)	34.0 (93.2)	36.5 (97.7)	36.5 (97.7)	39.4 (102.9)	37.9 (100.2)	36.0 (96.8)	27.5 (81.5)	20.2 (68.4)	15.1 (59.2)	39.4 (102.9)
Mean daily maximum °C (°F)	−1.7 (28.9)	2.8 (37.0)	9.5 (49.1)	17.2 (63.0)	23.1 (73.6)	27.6 (81.7)	29.4 (84.9)	27.3 (81.1)	22.0 (71.6)	15.2 (59.4)	6.9 (44.4)	−0.3 (31.5)	14.9 (58.9)
Daily mean °C (°F)	−9.6 (14.7)	−5.2 (22.6)	1.9 (35.4)	9.9 (49.8)	16.2 (61.2)	21.1 (70.0)	23.0 (73.4)	21.0 (69.8)	15.2 (59.4)	7.8 (46.0)	−0.6 (30.9)	−7.7 (18.1)	7.8 (45.9)
Mean daily minimum °C (°F)	−15.7 (3.7)	−11.5 (11.3)	−4.5 (23.9)	2.7 (36.9)	8.9 (48.0)	14.1 (57.4)	16.8 (62.2)	15.1 (59.2)	9.3 (48.7)	1.7 (35.1)	−6.2 (20.8)	−13.3 (8.1)	1.5 (34.6)
Record low °C (°F)	−35.3 (−31.5)	−32.4 (−26.3)	−22.6 (−8.7)	−13.0 (8.6)	−3.5 (25.7)	1.0 (33.8)	8.3 (46.9)	5.1 (41.2)	−2.8 (27.0)	−13.1 (8.4)	−20.8 (−5.4)	−30.7 (−23.3)	−35.3 (−31.5)
Average precipitation mm (inches)	1.5 (0.06)	3.2 (0.13)	7.1 (0.28)	9.8 (0.39)	25.2 (0.99)	39.6 (1.56)	62.1 (2.44)	59.2 (2.33)	40.1 (1.58)	14.6 (0.57)	6.5 (0.26)	0.9 (0.04)	269.8 (10.63)
Average precipitation days (≥ 0.1 mm)	1.7	1.9	3.0	2.7	5.4	7.6	9.7	9.0	7.4	4.2	2.4	1.2	56.2
Average snowy days	3.0	3.2	2.8	1.1	0.1	0	0	0	0	0.9	2.6	2.7	16.4
Average relative humidity (%)	50	44	37	32	35	42	54	58	59	52	51	50	47
Mean monthly sunshine hours	209.4	206.5	239.3	257.8	288.9	275.2	266.4	252.0	223.9	237.8	210.4	203.8	2,871.4
Percentage possible sunshine	69	68	64	65	65	62	59	60	61	70	71	70	65
Source 1: China Meteorological Administration
Source 2: Weather China

== Economy ==
As of 2019, Otog Banner had a gross domestic product (GDP) of 36.036 billion renminbi (RMB), a 8.4% increase from the previous year. Otog Banner's economy is largely industrial: the banner's primary sector accounts for 2.60% of its GDP, the secondary sector accounts for 73.10% of its GDP, and the tertiary sector accounts for 24.30%.

The per capita disposable income for residents of Otog Banner is 37,973 RMB as of 2019, a 7.4% increase from the previous year. Urban residents of Otog Banner average a disposable income of 48,994 RMB, which ranks 4th among the 101 county-level divisions of Inner Mongolia which reported this data in 2019. Rural residents average 20,244 RMB of disposable income, which ranks 24th among the 90 county-level divisions of Inner Mongolia which reported this data in 2019.

== Education ==
As of 2019, Otog Banner has eight primary schools and six regular secondary schools.

== Culture ==
As of 2019, Otog Banner has two theaters, and one stadium.
