= Rock paintings of Zhuozi Mountain =

Rock paintings in Inner Mongolia, China

Petroglyphs of Mount Zhuozi
- Interactive map of Petroglyphs of Mount Zhuozi
- Periods: Neolithic
- Location: Zhuozi Mountain, Inner Mongolia

Site notes
- Discovered: 1973

The rock paintings of Zhuozi Mountain also known as the petroglyphs of Zhuozi Shan, rock art of Zhouzi Mountain (simplified Chinese: 桌子山岩画; traditional Chinese: 桌子山岩畫; pinyin: Zhuōzi shān Yánhuà), or Zhuozi Mountain rock painting group (桌子山岩画群), is a historical and cultural site located at the western foot of Zhuozi Mountain, Wuhai City, Inner Mongolia, People's Republic of China.

The rock paintings of Zhuozi Mountain, dating back to more than 5000 years ago, is a Major Historical and Cultural Site Protected at the National Level in China. This historical and cultural site includes masks of God, footprints, images of human beings, riders on hunting trips, animals, symbols, and so on, but mainly masks of God.

== Discovery and research ==
The rock paintings were first discovered by a local herder in 1973 and has been noticed and studied by the archaeological community since 1979.

Although it is impossible to determine the exact age of the rock paintings of Zhuozi Mountain by scientific means, it is generally certain that they are the remains of a Neolithic culture.
