= Haibowan District =

Haibowan 海勃湾区 • ᠬᠠᠶᠢᠷᠤᠪ ᠤᠨ ᠲᠣᠬᠣᠢ ᠲᠣᠭᠤᠷᠢᠭ Hairibin Tohoi
- District
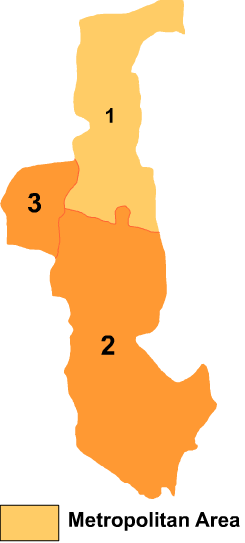
- Haibowan is the division labeled '1' on this map

- Location within Inner Mongolia Location within China
- Coordinates (Haibowan District government): 39°41′27″N 106°49′22″E
- Country: China
- Autonomous region: Inner Mongolia
- Prefecture-level city: Wuhai
- District seat: Fenghuangling Subdistrict

Area
  - Total: 470.9 km^{2} (181.8 sq mi)
- Elevation: 1,101 m (3,612 ft)

Population (2020)
  - Total: 339,155
  - Density: 720.2/km^{2} (1,865/sq mi)
- Time zone: UTC+8 (China Standard)
- Website: www.haibowan.gov.cn

Haibowan District

Chinese name
- Simplified Chinese: 海勃湾区
- Traditional Chinese: 海勃灣區
Transcriptions
Standard Mandarin
- Hanyu Pinyin: Hǎibówān Qū

Mongolian name
- Mongolian Cyrillic: Хайрвийн тохой тойрог
- Mongolian script: ᠬᠠᠶᠢᠷᠤᠪ ᠤᠨ ᠲᠣᠬᠣᠢ ᠲᠣᠭᠤᠷᠢᠭ
Transcriptions
- SASM/GNC: Qayirub-un Toqoi toɣoriɣ

Haibowan District (Mongolian: ᠬᠠᠶᠢᠷᠤᠪ ᠤᠨ ᠲᠣᠬᠣᠢ ᠲᠣᠭᠤᠷᠢᠭ; Chinese: 海勃湾区) or Hairibin Tohoi District is a district of the city of Wuhai, Inner Mongolia, China.

== Administrative divisions ==
Haibowan District is made up of 6 subdistricts and 1 town. The former Kabuqi Subdistrict (卡布其街道 was incorporated into Xinhua in 2021.

Name	Simplified Chinese	Hanyu Pinyin	Mongolian (Hudum Script)	Mongolian (Cyrillic)	Administrative division code
Subdistricts
Fenghuangling Subdistrict	凤凰岭街道	Fènghuánglǐng Jiēdào	ᠹᠧᠩ ᠬᠤᠸᠠᠩ ᠯᠢᠩ ᠵᠡᠭᠡᠯᠢ ᠭᠤᠳᠤᠮᠵᠢ	Фен хуан лин зээл гудамж	150302001
Haibei Subdistrict	海北街道	Hǎiběi Jiēdào	ᠬᠠᠢᠪᠧᠢ ᠵᠡᠭᠡᠯᠢ ᠭᠤᠳᠤᠮᠵᠢ	Хайбей зээл гудамж	150302002
Xinhua Subdistrict	新华街道	Xīnhuá Jiēdào	ᠰᠢᠨᠬᠤᠸᠠ ᠵᠡᠭᠡᠯᠢ ᠬᠤᠳᠤᠮᠵᠢ	Шэнхуа зээл худамж	150302003
Xinhua West Subdistrict	新华西街道	Xīnhuáxī Jiēdào	ᠰᠢᠨᠬᠤᠸᠠ ᠪᠠᠷᠠᠭᠤᠨ ᠵᠡᠭᠡᠯᠢ ᠭᠤᠳᠤᠮᠵᠢ	Шэнхуа баруун зээл гудамж	150302004
Binhe Subdistrict	滨河街道	Bīnhé Jiēdào	ᠪᠢᠨ ᠾᠧ ᠵᠡᠭᠡᠯᠢ ᠭᠤᠳᠤᠮᠵᠢ	Бин ге зээл гудамж	150302007
Linyin Subdistrict	林荫街道	Línyīn Jiēdào	ᠯᠢᠨ ᠶᠢᠨ ᠵᠡᠭᠡᠯᠢ ᠭᠤᠳᠤᠮᠵᠢ	Лин ин зээл гудамж	150302008
Town
Qianlishan Town	千里山镇	Qiānlǐshān Zhèn	ᠴᠢᠶᠠᠨ ᠯᠢ ᠱᠠᠨ ᠪᠠᠯᠭᠠᠰᠤ (ᠴᠢᠶᠠᠨ ᠯᠢ ᠱᠠᠨ ᠪᠠᠯᠭᠠᠰᠤ)	Чаан ли шин балгас	150302101
