= Zhuozi Mountain =

Mountain in Inner Mongolia, China

Mount Zhuozi

Highest point
- Elevation: 2,149 m (7,051 ft)
- Coordinates: 39°38′N 106°59′E

Geography
- Location: Inner Mongolia

Zhuozi Mountain or Zhuozi Shan (Chinese: 桌子山; pinyin: Zhuōzi shān), also known as Mount Zhuozi or West Zhuozi Mountain (西桌子山), is located in the east of Wuhai City, Inner Mongolia, People's Republic of China, in the west of the Ordos Plateau.

== Geography ==
Zhuozi Mountain runs north-south, about 75 kilometers long, with the southern edge of Helan Mountains across the Yellow River.

The main peak of the Zhuozi Mountain is 2,149 meters above sea level, and its top is flat and table-like, so it is called "Table Mountain".

At the western foot of Zhuozi Mountain, there is the Rock Paintings of Zhuozi Mountain, dating back to more than 5000 years ago, which is a Major Historical and Cultural Site Protected at the National Level in China.
