= 2012 ATP China Challenger International – Doubles =

Doubles
- 2012 ATP China Challenger International

Final
- Champions: (Thailand) Sanchai Ratiwatana (Thailand) Sonchat Ratiwatana
- Runners-up: (Australia) Adam Feeney (Australia) Samuel Groth
- Score: 6–4, 2–6, [10–8]

Events
Singles	Doubles
← 2011 ·	ATP China Challenger International	· 2013 →

Sanchai Ratiwatana and Sonchat Ratiwatana won the title, defeating Adam Feeney and Samuel Groth 6–4, 2–6, [10–8] in the final.

== Seeds ==
1. (Thailand) Sanchai Ratiwatana / (Thailand) Sonchat Ratiwatana (champions)
2. (Chinese Taipei) Lee Hsin-han / (Chinese Taipei) Yang Tsung-hua (semifinals)
3. (India) Purav Raja / (France) Laurent Rochette (quarterfinals)
4. (Japan) Hiroki Kondo / (Chinese Taipei) Yi Chu-huan (quarterfinals)

== Draw ==
=== Key ===
- Q = Qualifier
- WC = Wild card
- LL = Lucky loser
- Alt = Alternate
- ITF = ITF entry
- PR = Protected ranking
- SR = Special ranking
- SE = Special exempt
- JE = Junior exempt
- JR = Junior Accelerator Programme entrant
- CO = College Accelerator Programme entrant
- NG = Next Gen Accelerator Program entrant
- w/o = Walkover
- r = Retired
- d = Defaulted

=== Draw ===
First round
1	(Thailand) Sa Ratiwatana (Thailand) So Ratiwatana	6	6
(Slovenia) A Bedene (Slovenia) G Žemlja	4	2
WC	(China) Xue Feng (China) Z Zhang	4	2
(France) V Millot (France) J Ouanna	6	6
4	(Japan) H Kondo (Chinese Taipei) Yi Chu-huan	6	6
(Japan) Hiroki Moriya (Japan) B Sato	3	4
(Monaco) B Balleret (France) P-H Herbert	6	6
(India) Jeevan Nedunchezhiyan (Egypt) M Safwat	1	3
WC	(China) Chang Yu (Chinese Taipei) Peng Hsien-yin	3	2
(Australia) A Feeney (Australia) S Groth	6	6
(China) Gao Peng (China) W Gao	4	5
3	(India) P Raja (France) Laurent Rochette	6	7
WC	(China) Bai Yan (China) Ma Ya-Nan	6^{5}	4
(Chinese Taipei) T Chen (South Korea) Y-K Lim	7^{7}	6
(Chinese Taipei) Huang Liang-chi (Austria) N Moser	3	3
2	(Chinese Taipei) H-h ee (Chinese Taipei) T-h Yang	6	6

Quarterfinals
1	(Thailand) Sa Ratiwatana (Thailand) So Ratiwatana	7^{7}	6
(France) V Millot (France) J Ouanna	6^{3}	4
4	(Japan) H Kondo (Chinese Taipei) Yi Chu-huan	3	2
(Monaco) B Balleret (France) P-H Herbert	6	6
(Australia) A Feeney (Australia) S Groth	6	6
3	(India) P Raja (France) Laurent Rochette	1	2
(Chinese Taipei) T Chen (South Korea) Y-K Lim	3	5
2	(Chinese Taipei) H-h ee (Chinese Taipei) T-h Yang	6	7

Semifinals
1	(Thailand) Sa Ratiwatana (Thailand) So Ratiwatana	w/o
(Monaco) B Balleret (France) P-H Herbert
(Australia) A Feeney (Australia) S Groth	6	3	[10]
2	(Chinese Taipei) H-h ee (Chinese Taipei) T-h Yang	4	6	[6]

Final
1	(Thailand) Sa Ratiwatana (Thailand) So Ratiwatana	6	2	[10]
(Australia) A Feeney (Australia) S Groth	4	6	[8]
