= 2011 ATP China Challenger International – Doubles =

Doubles
- 2011 ATP China Challenger International

Final
- Champions: (Chinese Taipei) Lee Hsin-han (Chinese Taipei) Yang Tsung-hua
- Runners-up: (China) Feng He (China) Zhang Ze
- Score: 6–2, 7–6^{(7–4)}

Events
Singles	Doubles
← 2010 ·	ATP China Challenger International	· 2012 →

Lee Hsin-han and Yang Tsung-hua won the title, defeating Feng He and Zhang Ze 6–2, 7–6^{(7–4)} in the final.

== Seeds ==
1. (China) Gong Maoxin / (China) Li Zhe (quarterfinals)
2. (Thailand) Sanchai Ratiwatana / (Thailand) Sonchat Ratiwatana (first round)
3. (United States) John Paul Fruttero / (South Africa) Raven Klaasen (first round)
4. (United States) Nicholas Monroe / (Austria) Nikolaus Moser (quarterfinals)

== Draw ==
=== Key ===
- Q = Qualifier
- WC = Wild card
- LL = Lucky loser
- Alt = Alternate
- SE = Special exempt
- PR = Protected ranking
- ITF = ITF entry
- JE = Junior exempt
- w/o = Walkover
- r = Retired
- d = Defaulted
- SR = Special ranking

=== Draw ===
First round
1	(China) M Gong (China) Z Li	6	6
(India) D Sharan (Thailand) D Udomchoke	3	4
(Sweden) M Ryderstedt (Israel) A Weintraub	5	6	[7]
(Japan) H Kondo (Japan) G Soeda	7	1	[10]
4	(United States) N Monroe (Austria) N Moser	3	6	[10]
WC	(China) Ma Yanan (China) D Wu	6	3	[1]
WC	(China) Feng He (China) Z Zhang	6	3	[10]
(Spain) I Cervantes-Huegun (Spain) G Olaso	4	6	[4]
WC	(China) W Gao (China) Gao Peng	5	4
(Slovakia) K Čapkovič (Slovakia) M Semjan	7	6
(Thailand) W Doakmaiklee (Thailand) K Wachiramanowong	4	7^{7}	[10]
3	(United States) JP Fruttero (South Africa) R Klaasen	6	6^{2}	[7]
(Chinese Taipei) T Chen (South Korea) Y-k Lim	3	7^{7}	[3]
(Chinese Taipei) H-h Lee (Chinese Taipei) T-h Yang	6	6^{2}	[10]
(France) J Ouanna (France) G Rufin	6	5	[10]
2	(Thailand) Sa Ratiwatana (Thailand) So Ratiwatana	3	7	[8]

Quarterfinals
1	(China) M Gong (China) Z Li	5	6	[8]
(Japan) H Kondo (Japan) G Soeda	7	4	[10]
4	(United States) N Monroe (Austria) N Moser	3	6^{4}
WC	(China) Feng He (China) Z Zhang	6	7^{7}
(Slovakia) K Čapkovič (Slovakia) M Semjan	4	2
(Thailand) W Doakmaiklee (Thailand) K Wachiramanowong	6	6
(Chinese Taipei) H-h Lee (Chinese Taipei) T-h Yang	7^{7}	3	[10]
(France) J Ouanna (France) G Rufin	6^{3}	6	[2]

Semifinals
(Japan) H Kondo (Japan) G Soeda	7^{7}	5	[8]
WC	(China) Feng He (China) Z Zhang	6^{2}	7	[10]
(Thailand) W Doakmaiklee (Thailand) K Wachiramanowong	1	4
(Chinese Taipei) H-h Lee (Chinese Taipei) T-h Yang	6	6

Final
WC	(China) Feng He (China) Z Zhang	2	6^{4}
(Chinese Taipei) H-h Lee (Chinese Taipei) T-h Yang	6	7^{7}
