= Qipanjing, Inner Mongolia =

Qipanjing 棋盘井镇 ᠴᠢ ᠫᠠᠨ ᠵᠢᠩ
- Town
- Location within Inner Mongolia Location within China
- Coordinates: 39°22′48″N 107°0′56″E
- Country: China
- Province: Inner Mongolia
- Prefecture: Ordos City
- County: Otog Banner

Area
  - Total: 3,614 km^{2} (1,395 sq mi)

Population
  - Estimate (2018): 82,000
- Postal code: 014300
- Area code: 0477

Qipanjing (simplified Chinese: 棋盘井镇; traditional Chinese: 棋盤井鎮; pinyin: Qípánjǐng Zhèn) Chi pan jin (Mongolian: ᠴᠢ
ᠫᠠᠨ
ᠵᠢᠩ; Чи пан жин) is a town in Otog Banner, Ordos City, Inner Mongolia, China.

== Climate ==
Qipanjing has an average annual temperature of 6.4 °C (43.5 °F), an annual precipitation of about 250 millimetres (9.8 in), and approximately 3,000 annual hours of sunshine. Most of the town's precipitation occurs from July to September.

== Environment ==
The town of Qipanjing suffers from high levels of air pollution due to the presence of numerous coal mines in the area. Large amounts of coal are also burned for heating purposes in the spring and winter, which, combined with meteorological factors, lead to high levels of air contaminants.

The area is home to a number of nationally-protected rare flora, including Tetraena, Cistaceae, and the Mongolian almond. It is also the natural habitat of the A'erbasi White Goat (Chinese: 阿尔巴斯白山羊; pinyin: Ā'ěrbāsī Bái Shānyáng).

== Administrative divisions ==
Qipanjing administers ten residential communities, five administrative villages, and five gachas (Chinese: 嘎查; pinyin: Gāchá).

=== Residential communities ===
Qipanjing administers the following ten residential communities:

- Qipan Community (Chinese: 棋盘社区; pinyin: Qípán Shèqū)
- Guye Community (Chinese: 固业社区; pinyin: Gùyè Shèqū)
- Mengxiang Community (Chinese: 梦翔社区; pinyin: Mèngxiáng Shèqū)
- Wuzhu'er Community (Chinese: 乌珠尔社区; pinyin: Wūzhū'ěr Shèqū)
- Jing'an Community (Chinese: 靖安社区; pinyin: Jìng'ān Shèqū)
- Aili Community (Chinese: 艾力社区; pinyin: Àilì Shèqū)
- Xinxin Community (Chinese: 新欣社区; pinyin: Xīnxīn Shèqū)
- Caozichang Community (Chinese: 草籽场社区; pinyin: Cǎozǐchǎng Shèqū)
- Sanbeiyangchang Community (Chinese: 三北羊场社区; pinyin: Sānběiyángchǎng Shèqū)
- Qixiang Community (Chinese: 祺祥社区; pinyin: Qíxiáng Shèqū)

=== Villages ===
Qipanjing administers the following five villages:

- Shenjing Village (Chinese: 深井村; pinyin: Shēnjǐng Cūn)
- Baiyanjing Village (Chinese: 百眼井村; pinyin: Bǎiyǎnjǐng Cūn)
- Aruqiriga Village (Chinese: 阿如其日嘎村; pinyin: Ārúqírìgā Cūn)
- Shileikai Village (Chinese: 石勒凯村; pinyin: Shílēikǎi Cūn)
- Sumitu Village (Chinese: 苏米图村; pinyin: Sūmǐtú Cūn)

=== Gachas ===
Qipanjing administers the following five gachas:

- Wurenduxi Gacha (Chinese: 乌仁都喜嘎查; pinyin: Wūréndūxǐ Gāchá)
- Huji Gacha (Chinese: 呼吉嘎查; pinyin: Hūjí Gāchá)
- Yikedalai Gacha (Chinese: 伊克达赖嘎查; pinyin: Yīkèdálài Gāchá)
- Chulubai Gacha (Chinese: 楚鲁拜嘎查; pinyin: Chǔlǔbài Gāchá)
- E'erhetu Gacha (Chinese: 额尔和图嘎查; pinyin: É'ěrhétú Gāchá)

== Demographics ==
Per a 2023 publication by the government of Otog Banner, Qipanjing has an estimated population of 98,000. A 2021 research paper estimated the town's population at 82,000. Qipanjing had an estimated population growth of 50,000 between 2013 and 2018.

The town is largely urbanized, with an urbanization rate of approximately 79.18% as of 2023.

== Economy ==
The town is home to two sizable industrial zones: Mengxi Industrial Park and Qipanjing Economic Development Zone. Coal mining has a significant presence in the area, and the town has multiple power plants. Qipanjing is an important regional transportation hub, connecting major cities in nearby regions.

== Culture ==
Major cultural sites in Qipanjing include the A'erzhai Grottoes (Chinese: 阿尔寨石窟; pinyin: Ā'ěrzhài Shíkū), Diyan'agui Temple, and the Baiyan Well (Chinese: 百眼井; pinyin: Bǎiyǎn Jǐng; lit. 'Hundred Eyes Well').
