= 2012 ATP China Challenger International =

- Date: 21–29 July
- Edition: 2nd
- Surface: Hard
- Location: Wuhan, China

Champions

Singles
- (Slovenia) Aljaž Bedene

Doubles
- (Thailand) Sanchai Ratiwatana/ (Thailand) Sonchat Ratiwatana
- ATP China Challenger International

The 2012 ATP China Challenger International was a professional tennis tournament played on hard courts. It was the second edition of the tournament which was part of the 2012 ATP Challenger Tour. It took place in Wuhan, China between 21 and 29 July 2012.

== Singles main-draw entrants ==
=== Seeds ===
Country	Player	Rank^{1}	Seed
SVN	Aljaž Bedene	114	1
SVN	Grega Žemlja	119	2
JPN	Yūichi Sugita	168	3
TPE	Yang Tsung-hua	174	4
CHN	Zhang Ze	184	5
FRA	Josselin Ouanna	185	6
JPN	Hiroki Moriya	219	7
FRA	Laurent Rochette	228	8

- ^{1} Rankings are as of July 16, 2012.

=== Other entrants ===
The following players received wildcards into the singles main draw:

- (China) Ma Ya-Nan
- (China) Ning Yuqing
- (China) Ouyang Bowen
- (China) Wang Chuhan

The following players received entry from the qualifying draw:

- (Australia) Matthew Barton
- (Australia) Adam Feeney
- (Austria) Nikolaus Moser
- (Australia) Luke Saville

== Champions ==
=== Singles ===
- (Slovenia) Aljaž Bedene def (France) Josselin Ouanna, 6–3, 4–6, 6–3

=== Doubles ===
- (Thailand) Sanchai Ratiwatana / (Thailand) Sonchat Ratiwatana def. (Australia) Adam Feeney / (Australia) Samuel Groth, 6–4, 2–6, [10–8].
