= 2011 ATP China Challenger International – Singles =

Singles
- 2011 ATP China Challenger International

Final
- Champion: (Japan) Go Soeda
- Runner-up: (South Africa) Raven Klaasen
- Score: 7–5, 6–4

Events
Singles	Doubles
- ATP China Challenger International

Go Soeda won the first edition of this tournament, defeating Raven Klaasen 7–5, 6–4 in the final.

== Seeds ==
1. (Japan) Go Soeda (champion)
2. (Spain) Guillermo Olaso (second round)
3. (Israel) Amir Weintraub (quarterfinals)
4. (Thailand) Danai Udomchoke (quarterfinals)
5. (France) Guillaume Rufin (second round)
6. (Slovakia) Marek Semjan (first round)
7. (Sweden) Michael Ryderstedt (second round)
8. (United States) Nicholas Monroe (quarterfinals)

== Draw ==
Key

- Q = Qualifier
- WC = Wild card
- LL = Lucky loser
- Alt = Alternate
- ITF = ITF entry
- PR = Protected ranking
- SR = Special ranking
- SE = Special exempt
- JE = Junior exempt
- JR = Junior Accelerator Programme entrant
- CO = College Accelerator Programme entrant
- NG = Next Gen Accelerator Program entrant
- w/o = Walkover
- r = Retired
- d = Defaulted

=== Finals ===
Semifinals
1	(Japan) G Soeda	6	7
(Chinese Taipei) Yang Tsung-hua	4	5
(South Africa) Raven Klaasen	6	7^{8}
(Spain) Iñigo Cervantes-Huegun	3	6^{6}

Final
1	(Japan) G Soeda	7	6
(South Africa) Raven Klaasen	5	4

=== Top half ===
First round
1	(Japan) G Soeda	6	6
WC	(China) Li Dawei	2	1
(China) W Di	6	6
(Slovakia) K Čapkovič	3	2
(Japan) Hiroki Moriya	4	4
(South Korea) Y-k Lim	6	6
(France) J Ouanna	7	6
6	(Slovakia) M Semjan	5	3
4	(Thailand) D Udomchoke	3	6	6
(Chinese Taipei) T Chen	6	3	2
(South Korea) W-s Jun	2	3
(South Korea) Y-j Kim	6	6
(Chinese Taipei) T-h Yang	6	6
WC	(China) Wang Chuhan	2	4
(Austria) N Moser	3	2
5	(France) G Rufin	6	6

Second round
1	(Japan) G Soeda	4	6	6
(China) W Di	6	2	2
(South Korea) Y-k Lim	6	3	7^{7}
(France) J Ouanna	3	6	6^{5}
4	(Thailand) D Udomchoke	6	6
(South Korea) Y-j Kim	4	2
(Chinese Taipei) T-h Yang	6	7^{7}
5	(France) G Rufin	4	6^{2}

Quarterfinals
1	(Japan) G Soeda	6	6
(South Korea) Y-k Lim	4	4
4	(Thailand) D Udomchoke	6	6^{12}	4
(Chinese Taipei) T-h Yang	2	7^{14}	6

Semifinals
1	(Japan) G Soeda	6	7
(Chinese Taipei) T-h Yang	4	5

=== Bottom half ===
First round
7	(Sweden) M Ryderstedt	6	6
LL	(China) Gao Peng	3	4
WC	(China) Lu Yang	6^{5}	1
(South Africa) R Klaasen	7^{7}	6
(China) M Gong	6^{5}	6	6^{2}
Q	(Japan) Kento Takeuchi	7^{7}	2	7^{7}
(Japan) H Kondo	3	2
3	(Israel) A Weintraub	6	6
8	(United States) N Monroe	7	6
(China) Z Zhang	5	2
Q	(Thailand) K Wachiramanowong	6^{7}	6	7
WC	(China) Ma Yanan	7	4	6^{2}
(Spain) I Cervantes-Huegun	6	6
Q	(Chinese Taipei) H-h Lee	4	2
Q	(South Korea) J-s An	2	2
2	(Spain) G Olaso	6	6

Second round
7	(Sweden) M Ryderstedt	3	4
(South Africa) R Klaasen	6	6
Q	(Japan) Kento Takeuchi	3	7^{7}	1
3	(Israel) A Weintraub	6	6^{2}	6
8	(United States) N Monroe	7^{7}	6^{6}	6
Q	(Thailand) K Wachiramanowong	6^{4}	7^{8}	1
(Spain) I Cervantes-Huegun	4	6	6
2	(Spain) G Olaso	6	3	2

Quarterfinals
(South Africa) R Klaasen	4	6	6
3	(Israel) A Weintraub	6	3	4
8	(United States) N Monroe	4	4
(Spain) I Cervantes-Huegun	6	6

Semifinals
(South Africa) R Klaasen	6	7^{8}
(Spain) I Cervantes-Huegun	3	6^{6}
