= Otog Front Banner =

Otog Front Banner 鄂托克前旗 • ᠣᠲᠣᠭ ᠤᠨ ᠡᠮᠦᠨᠡᠳᠦ ᠬᠣᠰᠢᠭᠤ
- Banner
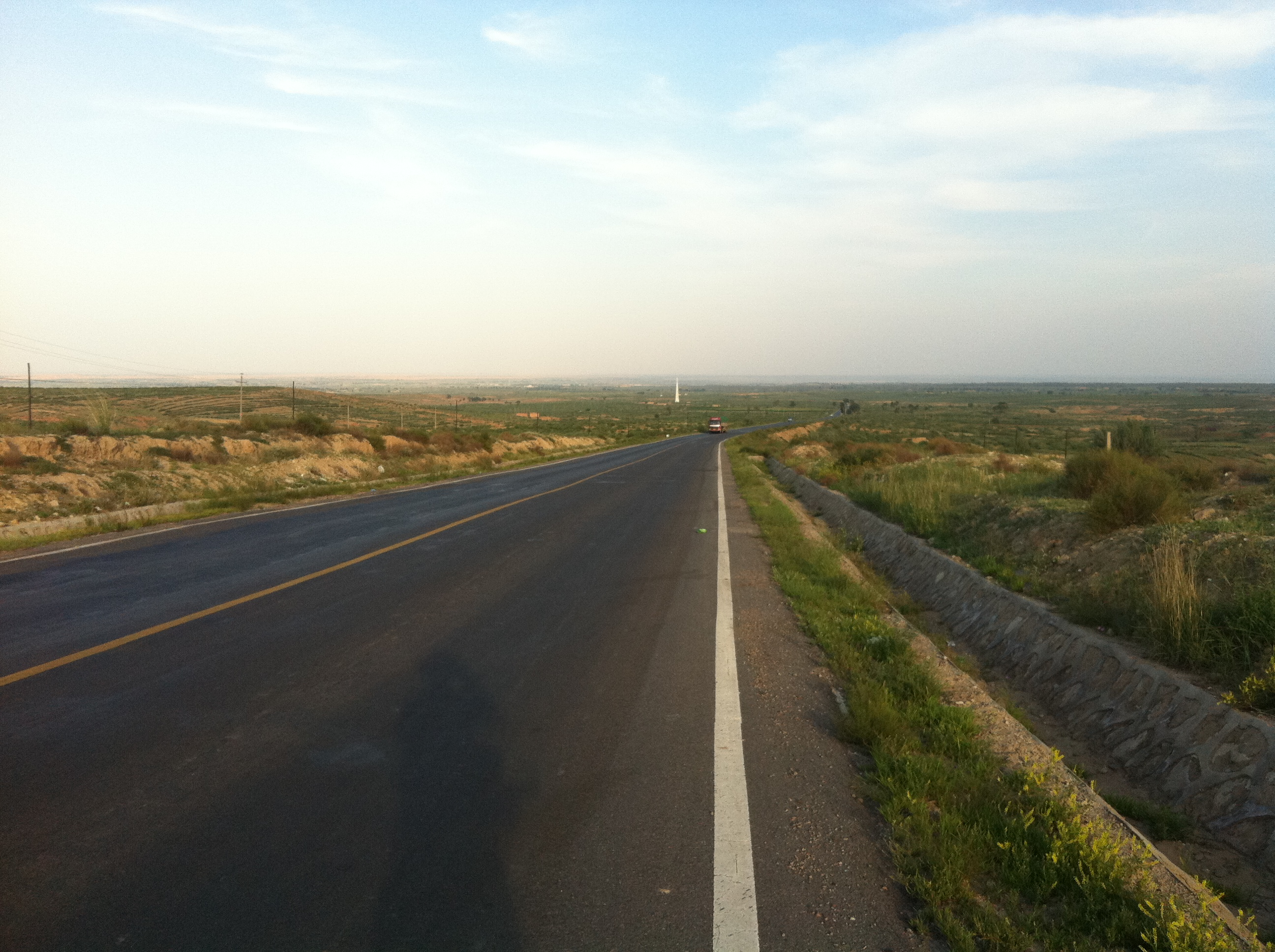

- Location in Inner Mongolia Otog Front (China)
- Coordinates: 38°11′N 107°29′E
- Country: China
- Autonomous region: Inner Mongolia
- Prefecture-level city: Ordos
- Banner seat: Oljoq

Area
  - Total: 12,220 km^{2} (4,720 sq mi)
- Elevation: 1,340 m (4,400 ft)

Population (2020)
  - Total: 92,724
  - Density: 7.588/km^{2} (19.65/sq mi)
- Time zone: UTC+8 (China Standard)
- Website: www.etkqq.gov.cn

Otog Front Banner

Chinese name
- Chinese: 鄂托克前旗
Transcriptions
Standard Mandarin
- Hanyu Pinyin: Ètuōkè Qiánqí
Yue: Cantonese
- Jyutping: ngok^{6}tok^{3}hak^{1} cin^{4}kei^{4}

Mongolian name
- Mongolian Cyrillic: Отгийн өмнөд хошуу
- Mongolian script: ᠣᠲᠣᠭ ᠤᠨ ᠡᠮᠦᠨᠡᠳᠦ ᠬᠣᠰᠢᠭᠤ
Transcriptions
- SASM/GNC: Otoɣ-un Emünedü qosiɣu

Otog Front Banner (Mongolian: ᠣᠲᠣᠭ ᠤᠨ ᠡᠮᠦᠨᠡᠳᠦ ᠬᠣᠰᠢᠭᠤ; Chinese: 鄂托克前旗) is a banner of southwestern Inner Mongolia, China, bordering Ningxia to the southwest and Shaanxi province to the southeast. It is under the administration of Ordos City.

== Administrative divisions ==
Otog Front Banner is made up of 4 towns.

Name	Simplified Chinese	Hanyu Pinyin	Mongolian (Hudum Script)	Mongolian (Cyrillic)	Administrative division code
Towns
Oljoq Town	敖勒召其镇	Áolèzhàoqí Zhèn	ᠣᠯᠵᠠᠴᠢ ᠪᠠᠯᠭᠠᠰᠤ	Олзч балгас	150623100
Shanghaimiao Town	上海庙镇	Shànghǎimiào Zhèn	ᠱᠠᠩᠬᠠᠢ ᠶᠢᠨ ᠰᠦᠮ᠎ᠡ ᠪᠠᠯᠭᠠᠰᠤ	Шанхайн сүм балгас	150623101
Chengchuan Town	城川镇	Chéngchuān Zhèn	ᠪᠣᠷᠣᠪᠠᠯᠭᠠᠰᠤ ᠪᠠᠯᠭᠠᠰᠤ	Борбалгас балгас	150623102
Nangsu Town	昂素镇	Ángsù Zhèn	ᠨᠠᠩᠰᠤ ᠪᠠᠯᠭᠠᠰᠤ	Нанс балгас	150623103

- Other: Shanghaimiao Economic Development Zone (上海庙经济开发区)

== Climate ==
Climate data for Otog Front Banner, elevation 1,333 m (4,373 ft), (1991–2020 normals, extremes 1981–2010)
Month	Jan	Feb	Mar	Apr	May	Jun	Jul	Aug	Sep	Oct	Nov	Dec	Year
Record high °C (°F)	15.3 (59.5)	19.2 (66.6)	27.2 (81.0)	34.1 (93.4)	34.9 (94.8)	37.1 (98.8)	37.7 (99.9)	35.6 (96.1)	35.1 (95.2)	28.5 (83.3)	23.5 (74.3)	16.9 (62.4)	37.7 (99.9)
Mean daily maximum °C (°F)	−0.2 (31.6)	4.4 (39.9)	11.1 (52.0)	18.5 (65.3)	23.9 (75.0)	28.3 (82.9)	29.9 (85.8)	27.8 (82.0)	22.6 (72.7)	16.4 (61.5)	8.6 (47.5)	1.3 (34.3)	16.1 (60.9)
Daily mean °C (°F)	−9.0 (15.8)	−4.3 (24.3)	3.0 (37.4)	10.8 (51.4)	16.8 (62.2)	21.5 (70.7)	23.4 (74.1)	21.2 (70.2)	15.6 (60.1)	8.4 (47.1)	0.2 (32.4)	−7.2 (19.0)	8.4 (47.1)
Mean daily minimum °C (°F)	−16.1 (3.0)	−11.6 (11.1)	−4.2 (24.4)	3.0 (37.4)	9.2 (48.6)	14.1 (57.4)	16.8 (62.2)	15.1 (59.2)	9.3 (48.7)	1.8 (35.2)	−6.2 (20.8)	−14.0 (6.8)	1.4 (34.6)
Record low °C (°F)	−31.4 (−24.5)	−30.3 (−22.5)	−22.3 (−8.1)	−10.7 (12.7)	−5.7 (21.7)	0.9 (33.6)	7.8 (46.0)	5.7 (42.3)	−3.5 (25.7)	−15.9 (3.4)	−23.4 (−10.1)	−30.2 (−22.4)	−31.4 (−24.5)
Average precipitation mm (inches)	2.3 (0.09)	3.3 (0.13)	6.6 (0.26)	12.1 (0.48)	26.3 (1.04)	31.0 (1.22)	54.3 (2.14)	62.2 (2.45)	42.0 (1.65)	14.2 (0.56)	8.1 (0.32)	1.5 (0.06)	263.9 (10.4)
Average precipitation days (≥ 0.1 mm)	3.0	2.0	2.9	3.6	5.5	7.2	9.1	9.4	8.5	4.9	3.0	1.3	60.4
Average snowy days	4.0	3.1	2.5	0.8	0.1	0	0	0	0	0.9	2.6	2.5	16.5
Average relative humidity (%)	52	46	39	35	38	44	56	62	63	56	53	52	50
Mean monthly sunshine hours	216.2	213.6	247.0	267.6	298.1	297.4	292.3	266.4	231.7	243.4	222.2	214.0	3,009.9
Percentage possible sunshine	71	70	66	67	67	67	66	64	63	71	74	73	68
Source: China Meteorological Administration
