= Beijing Panam International Aviation Academy =

Chinese airline training facility

Beijing Panam International Aviation Academy is the largest privately owned airline training facility in the People's Republic of China.
