= Hainan District =

Hainan 海南区 • ᠬᠠᠶᠢᠨᠠᠨ ᠲᠣᠭᠣᠷᠢᠭ
- District
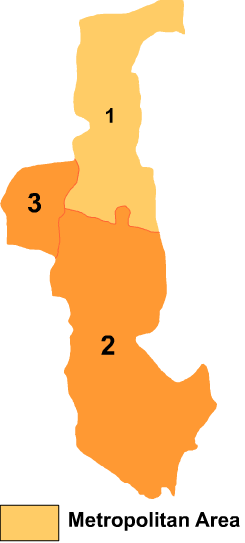
- Hainan District is labeled '2' on this map of Wuhai City

- Location in Inner Mongolia Hainan (China)
- Coordinates: 39°26′29″N 106°53′29″E
- Country: China
- Autonomous region: Inner Mongolia
- Prefecture-level city: Wuhai
- District seat: Lasengzhong Subdistrict

Area
  - Total: 951.9 km^{2} (367.5 sq mi)
- Elevation: 1,218 m (3,996 ft)

Population (2020)
  - Total: 94,770
  - Density: 99.56/km^{2} (257.9/sq mi)
- Time zone: UTC+8 (China Standard)
- Website: www.hainanqu.gov.cn

Hainan District

Chinese name
- Simplified Chinese: 海南区
- Traditional Chinese: 海南區
Transcriptions
Standard Mandarin
- Hanyu Pinyin: Hǎinán Qū

Mongolian name
- Mongolian Cyrillic: Хайнан тойрог
- Mongolian script: ᠬᠠᠶᠢᠨᠠᠨ ᠲᠣᠭᠣᠷᠢᠭ
Transcriptions
- SASM/GNC: Qayinan toɣorig

Hainan District (Mongolian: ᠬᠠᠶᠢᠨᠠᠨ ᠲᠣᠭᠣᠷᠢᠭ; Chinese: 海南区) is one of three districts of the city of Wuhai, Inner Mongolia, China, bordering Ningxia to the southwest.

== Administrative divisions ==
Hainan District is made up of 2 subdistricts and 3 towns.

Name	Simplified Chinese	Hanyu Pinyin	Mongolian (Hudum Script)	Mongolian (Cyrillic)	Administrative division code
Subdistricts
Lasengzhong Subdistrict	拉僧仲街道	Lāsēngzhòng Jiēdào	ᠷᠠᠰᠢᠵᠦ᠋ᠩ ᠵᠡᠭᠡᠯᠢ ᠭᠤᠳᠤᠮᠵᠢ	Рашзон зээл гудамж	150303001
West Zhuozi Mountain Subdistrict	西卓子山街道	Xīzhuózishān Jiēdào	ᠪᠠᠷᠠᠭᠤᠨ ᠵᠦᠸᠧᠽᠢ ᠱᠠᠨ ᠵᠡᠭᠡᠯᠢ ᠭᠤᠳᠤᠮᠵᠢ	Баруун зүвези шин зээл гудамж	150303001
Towns
Gun Us Town	公乌素镇	Gōngwūsù Zhèn	ᠭᠦᠨᠤᠰᠤ ᠪᠠᠯᠭᠠᠰᠤ	гүн ус балгас	150303102
Lasengmiao Town	拉僧庙镇	Lāsēngmiào Zhèn	ᠷᠠᠰᠢᠵᠦ᠋ᠩ ᠰᠦᠮ᠎ᠡ ᠪᠠᠯᠭᠠᠰᠤ	Рашзон сүм балгас	150303103
Bayan Tohoi Town	巴音陶亥镇	Bāyīntáohài Zhèn	ᠪᠠᠶᠠᠨᠲᠣᠬᠣᠢ ᠪᠠᠯᠭᠠᠰᠤ	Баяндахуй балгас	150303104
