= Wuda District =

Wuda 乌达区 • ᠤᠳᠠ ᠲᠣᠭᠤᠷᠢᠭ Ud
- District
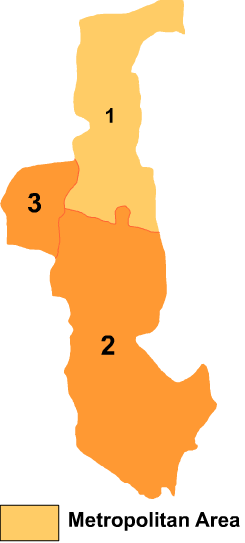
- Wuda is the division labeled '3' on this map of Wuhai City

- Wuda Wuda (China)
- Coordinates (Wuda District government): 39°30′20″N 106°43′34″E
- Country: China
- Autonomous region: Inner Mongolia
- Prefecture-level city: Wuhai
- District seat: Binhai Subdistrict

Area
  - Total: 195.2 km^{2} (75.4 sq mi)

Population (2020)
  - Total: 122,696
  - Density: 628.6/km^{2} (1,628/sq mi)
- Time zone: UTC+8 (China Standard)
- Website: www.wuda.gov.cn

Wuda District

Chinese name
- Simplified Chinese: 乌达区
- Traditional Chinese: 烏達區
Transcriptions
Standard Mandarin
- Hanyu Pinyin: Wūdá Qū

Mongolian name
- Mongolian Cyrillic: Уд тойрог
- Mongolian script: ᠤᠳᠠ ᠲᠣᠭᠤᠷᠢᠭ
Transcriptions
- SASM/GNC: Uda toɣoriɣ

Wuda District or Ud District (Mongolian: ᠤᠳᠠ ᠲᠣᠭᠤᠷᠢᠭ; Chinese: 乌达区) is a district of the city of Wuhai, Inner Mongolia, China, located on the west (left) bank of the Yellow River.

== Administrative divisions ==
Wuda District is made up of 7 subdistricts and 1 town.

Name	Simplified Chinese	Hanyu Pinyin	Mongolian (Hudum Script)	Mongolian (Cyrillic)	Administrative division code
Subdistricts
Sandaokan Subdistrict	三道坎街道	Sāndàokǎn Jiēdào	ᠰᠠᠨ ᠳ᠋ᠣᠤ ᠺᠠᠨ ᠵᠡᠭᠡᠯᠢ ᠭᠤᠳᠤᠮᠵᠢ	Сан доо кан зээл гудамж	150304002
Wuhushan Subdistrict	五虎山街道	Wǔhǔshān Jiēdào	ᠡᠦ ᠬᠤ ᠱᠠᠨ ᠵᠡᠭᠡᠯᠢ ᠭᠤᠳᠤᠮᠵᠢ	Үү хоо шин зээл гудамж	150304003
Xinda Subdistrict	新达街道	Xīndá Jiēdào	ᠰᠢᠨ ᠳ᠋ᠠ ᠵᠡᠭᠡᠯᠢ ᠭᠤᠳᠤᠮᠵᠢ	Шин да зээл гудамж	150304008
Bayan Sain Subdistrict	巴音赛街道	Bāyīnsài Jiēdào	ᠪᠠᠶᠠᠨᠰᠠᠢᠨ ᠵᠡᠭᠡᠯᠢ ᠭᠤᠳᠤᠮᠵᠢ	Баянсайн зээл гудамж	150304008
Liangjiagou Subdistrict	梁家沟街道	Liángjiāgōu Jiēdào	ᠯᠢᠶᠠᠩ ᠵᠢᠶᠠ ᠭᠧᠦ ᠵᠡᠭᠡᠯᠢ ᠭᠤᠳᠤᠮᠵᠢ	Лан жье гүү зээл гудамж	150304010
Suhait Subdistrict	苏海图街道	Sūhǎitú Jiēdào	ᠰᠤᠬᠠᠢᠲᠤ ᠵᠡᠭᠡᠯᠢ ᠭᠤᠳᠤᠮᠵᠢ	Сухайт зээл гудамж	150304011
Binhai Subdistrict	滨海街道	Bīnhǎi Jiēdào	ᠪᠢᠨ ᠬᠠᠢ ᠵᠡᠭᠡᠯᠢ ᠭᠤᠳᠤᠮᠵᠢ	Бин хай зээл гудамж	150304012
Town
Ulan Nur Town	乌兰淖尔镇	Wūlánnào'ěr Zhèn	ᠤᠯᠠᠭᠠᠨ ᠨᠠᠭᠤᠷ ᠪᠠᠯᠭᠠᠰᠤ	Улаан нуур балгас	150203100

Other:

- Uda Economic Development Zone (乌达经济开发区)
