= Wuhai =

Wuhai 乌海市 • ᠦᠬᠠᠢ ᠬᠣᠲᠠ
- Prefecture-level city
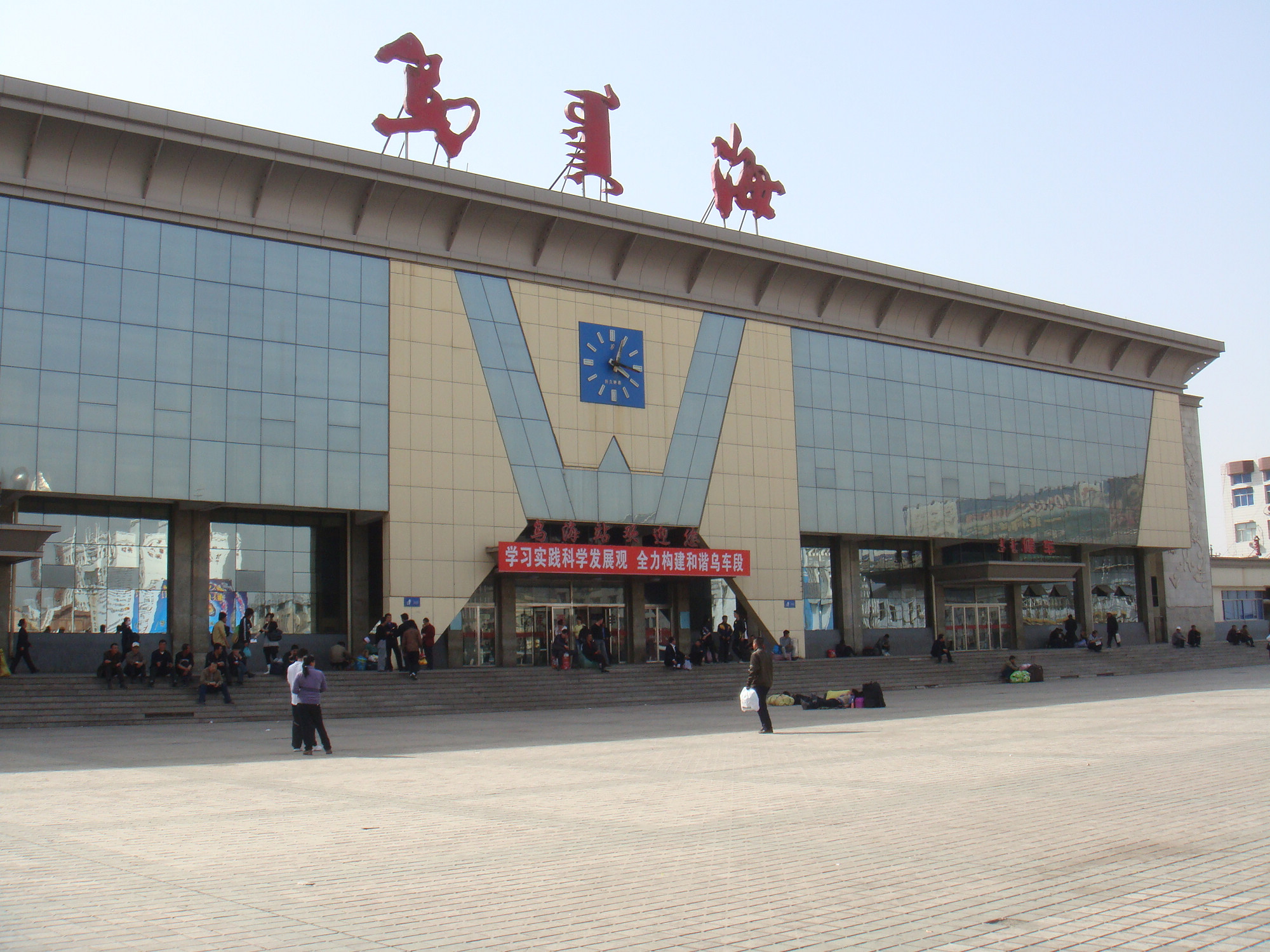
- Wuhai East Station

- Location of Wuhai City jurisdiction in Inner Mongolia

- Location of the city centre in Inner Mongolia
- Coordinates (Wuhai municipal government): 39°39′18″N 106°47′38″E
- Country: People's Republic of China
- Region: Inner Mongolia

Area
  - Prefecture-level city: 1,754 km^{2} (677 sq mi)
  - Urban (2017): 67.17 km^{2} (25.93 sq mi)
- Elevation: 1,150 m (3,770 ft)

Population (2017)
  - Prefecture-level city: 631,000
  - Density: 360/km^{2} (932/sq mi)
  - Urban: 550,000
  - Urban density: 8,200/km^{2} (21,000/sq mi)
- Time zone: UTC+8 (China Standard)
- Postal code: 016000
- ISO 3166 code: CN-NM-03
- GDP(2009): 31.121B RMB
- Website: www.wuhai.gov.cn

Wuhai

Chinese name
- Simplified Chinese: 乌海
- Traditional Chinese: 烏海
- Hanyu Pinyin: Wūhǎi
Transcriptions
Standard Mandarin
- Hanyu Pinyin: Wūhǎi
- Bopomofo: ㄨ ㄏㄞˇ
- Gwoyeu Romatzyh: Uhae
- Wade–Giles: Wu^{1}-hai^{3}
- IPA: [ú.xàɪ]

Mongolian name
- Mongolian Cyrillic: Үхай хот
- Mongolian script: ᠦᠬᠠᠢ ᠬᠣᠲᠠ
Transcriptions
- SASM/GNC: Üqai qota

Wuhai (Chinese: 乌海市; Mongolian: Üqai qota, Mongolian Cyrillic: Үхай хот) is a prefecture-level city and regional center in the Inner Mongolia Autonomous Region, China, and is by area the smallest prefecture-level division of the region. It is located on the Yellow River between the Gobi and Ordos deserts. Wuhai became a single city occupying both banks of the Yellow River with the amalgamation in 1976 of Wuda on the left (west) bank (then administrated by Bayan Nuur League) together with Haibowan on the right (east) bank (then administrated by Ikh Juu league). Wuhai is one of very few cities with an antipode which is not only on land (as opposed to open ocean), but which is another inhabited city; the antipode of Wuhai is almost exactly on the city of Valdivia, Chile. Football commentator and Television host Huang Jianxiang was born here.

== History ==
The modern location of Wuhai was originally composed of two towns: Wuda which lied on the western side of the Yellow River and Haibowan which was located in the eastern side of the river. Wuda became a coal mining town around 1864 when it was settled by Chinese laborers. Slightly later, Haibowan was settled by Chinese farmers around 1900. Wuda and Haibowan were merged as Wuhai in 1976.

In the second year of the Yuanshuo era (127 BCE) of Emperor Wu of the Han Dynasty, the Han forces defeated the Loufan and Baiyang kings of the Xiongnu, reclaiming the Henan region (covering the area south of the Wujia River in present-day Bayannur League and the Ordos Plateau). The existing Jiuyuan Commandery was renamed Wuyuan Commandery, and the Shuofang Commandery was newly established, with its administrative seat at Sanfeng County (located at the present-day Taoshengjing site, also known as the Mami Tukou Temple ancient city, in the Hateng Taohai Sumu of Dengkou County, Bayannur League). Shuofang Commandery comprised ten counties, including Woye County, which was established in what is now the Haibowan area. In the third year of the Yuanshuo era (120 BCE), the walled town of Woye County was constructed (the present-day Beixindi ancient city in Haibowan District). In the second year of the Yuanshuo era (121 BCE), after the southern Xiongnu king Hunye submitted to Han authority, the Wuda region became the northern territory of Wuwei Commandery.

During the Wei Jin dynasties, the present-day Wuda region was controlled by the Western Xianbei tribes. In the second year of the Daxing era (319 CE) of the Eastern Jin Dynasty, the Jie chieftain Shi Le rose to power, conquering vast territories across the middle and lower reaches of the Yellow River and establishing the Later Zhao state. The Haibowan area at that time belonged to Shuofang Commandery of Shuozhou under Later Zhao. Later, it was successively ruled by the Former Liang, Later Liang, and Northern Liang states.

In the second year of the Jianyuan era (366 CE) of the Former Qin, the region was later taken over by Former Qin and Former Yan, with the area west of the Yellow River falling under Former Qin and coming under the rule of the Di leader Fu Jian. The Haibowan region was then part of Shuofang Commandery under Former Qin.

In the second year of the Huangchu era (395 CE) of Later Qin, the Qiang leader Yao Xing rose to power, seizing the western territories of Former Qin and establishing Later Qin. Yao Xing set up Shuofang Commandery in the northern frontier regions, which included the present-day Haibowan area.

In the 16th year of the Taiyuan era (391 CE) of the Eastern Jin Dynasty, the Wei prince Tuoba Gui attacked the Tiefu tribe of Liu Weichen in Shuofang Commandery (which governed the southern part of present-day Bayannur League and the northern part of the former Yekejuu League). After Liu Weichen's defeat, his forces scattered, and his territory was fully incorporated into the Wei domain.

In the third year of the Yixi era (407 CE) of the Eastern Jin Dynasty, the Tiefu Xiongnu leader Helian Bobo grew powerful, establishing the Xia state in the area of present-day the Ordos region (formerly Yekejuu League) and northern Shaanxi, with its capital at Tongwan City (north of present-day Jingbian County, Shaanxi, commonly known as Baichengzi). At its height, Xia's territory extended north to the Yellow River, with Youzhou established at Dacheng (southeast of present-day Hanggin Banner in the Ordos region), encompassing the southern part of Bayannur League and the Ordos Plateau.

In the fourth year of the Shengguang era (431 CE), the Xia state was conquered by the Tuoba Xianbei-led Northern Wei, and its territories were absorbed into Northern Wei's domain.

Sui Renshou 2nd year (602 CE):Part of Suzhou, administered from Fulu (modern-day Jiuquan, Gansu). Tang Zhenguan 1st year (627 CE):The empire was divided into ten circuits (dao). Sui, Yin, Feng, Sheng, and other prefectures belonged to Guannei Circuit. The Lingzhou area of Guannei Circuit, governed by Sui's Lingwu Commandery, covered the eastern bank of the Yellow River's north–south flow, including western modern-day Otog Banner, western Otog Front Banner, and the Haibowan region. Uda region during the Sui Dynasty:Part of Ganzhou, administered from Yongping (renamed Zhangye during Sui; modern-day Zhangye, Gansu).

Song-Liao Period: The Tanguts rose in the northwest, seizing Yin, Xia, Sui, You, and Jing prefectures during Song-Liao conflicts. Song Jianlong 1st year (960 CE): Emperor Taizu granted Tangut leader Li Yixing the title of Grand Commandant. Li submitted 300 horses to the Song, nominally incorporating most of modern Ih Ju League (including Haibowan) into Song territory, though de facto controlled by the Tanguts. Song Baoyuan 1st year (1038 CE):Tangut leader Li Yuanhao declared himself emperor, founding Western Xia. Haibowan became part of Western Xia's Lingzhou; Uda fell under its Helan Mountain defenses. Yuan Dynasty: Wuhai was governed by Ningxia Province's Zhongxing Route. Yuan Zhiyuan 25th year (1288 CE):Zhongxing Route was renamed Ningxia Route, administered from modern Yinchuan.

Ming Dynasty:Uda was frontier land beyond Ganzhou and Suzhou Guards. Ming Hongwu 9th year (1376 CE): Ningxia Guard (later upgraded to a garrison) was established, governing Haibowan under Shaanxi's Regional Military Commission and the central Right Army Chief Military Commission. Ming Tianshun 6th year (1462 CE):Mongol leaders Altan and Mao Lihai occupied Ih Ju League. Ming Jiajing period (1552–1566CE):Dayan Khan's grandson Gün Bilig Mergeren inherited the Jinong title, naming his tribe Ordos. 1635 CE:Leader Ejei surrendered to the Qing, ruling Ordos. 1649 CE:Qing divided Ordos into six banners. Haibowan became part of Ordos Right Wing Middle Banner (Otog Banner). Kangxi 26th year (1697 CE): Alxa Khoshut Banner was established; Uda fell under Alxa jurisdiction.

Republic of China:Alxa Banner was first overseen by Ningxia's military commissioner, then directly by the Mongolian-Tibetan Affairs Commission.

1914:Otog Banner was assigned to Suiyuan Province.

1929:After Ningxia Province's establishment, Dengkou County claimed a 200 km Yellow River corridor (including Wuhai).

1930: Suiyuan established Woye Administrative Bureau (later Woye County) east of the Yellow River, governing Haibowan.

1937:Ningxia warlord Ma Hongkui occupied Woye County, renaming it Taole County.

1950: Alxa Khoshut Banner Autonomous Region established under Ningxia Province.

1954: Ningxia Mongol Autonomous Region formed, governing Alxa Banner and Dengkou County.

1955:Transferred to Gansu Province, renamed Bayanhot Mongol Autonomous Prefecture.

1956:Reassigned to Inner Mongolia as Bayan Nur League; Uda remained under Alxa Banner.

1958:Wuda Town established in Alxa Banner; Zhuozishan Mining District Office created in Ih Ju League.

1961:Wuda Town and Haibowan Mining District became county-level cities (Wuda City and Haibowan City) under Bayan Nur and Ih Ju leagues.

1975: State Council approved merging Haibowan and Wuda into Wuhai City (officially established 1976), directly governed by Inner Mongolia. Initial administration included three county-level offices: Wuda, Haibowan, and Lamazhao (renamed Hainan District in 1979).

=== Housing project scandal ===
Wuhai has been the center of public outrage when it was revealed that money originally assigned to build low income housing project was used to build extravagant office buildings instead

According to the 2006 official statistics by the local government, 45,344 households totaling 146,306 people, or over 30% of total population in the urban area, lived in shacks in the slums. These low income families had to deal with problems including the lacks of drainage, clean water supply and poor hygiene conditions. As a result, a housing project was planned to rebuild the area, starting in February, 2006. The plan called for 15% completion by the end of 2007, 40% completion respectively in 2008, and 2009, and the remaining by the end of 2010. In reality, however, the plan failed to materialize because not a single penny was provided. Subsequent investigation by auditing authorities and media investigation revealed that the CYN 150 million funds that were supposed used as the initial funding was used to build luxury office buildings instead.

== Demographics ==
Wuhai has an area of 1,754 km^{2} (677 sq mi) and, as of 2000, 427,553 inhabitants (243.76 inhabitants/km^{2}).

At the end of 2022, the city's permanent resident population was 560,200, an increase of 21,000 people (or 0.38%) compared to the end of 2021. Among the permanent resident population at the end of 2022, the urban permanent resident population was 537,500, an increase of 24,000 from the end of 2021; the rural permanent resident population was 22,700, a decrease of 300 from the end of 2021.

According to the Seventh National Population Census in 2020, the city's permanent resident population was 556,621. Compared with the 532,902 people recorded in the Sixth National Population Census, the total increase over the decade was 23,719 people, representing a growth of 4.45% and an average annual growth rate of 0.44%. Among them, the male population was 291,044, accounting for 52.29% of the total population; the female population was 265,577, accounting for 47.71% of the total population. The overall sex ratio (with females as 100) was 109.59. The population aged 0–14 was 74,750, accounting for 13.43% of the total population; the population aged 15–59 was 390,376, accounting for 70.13% of the total population; the population aged 60 and above was 91,495, accounting for 16.44% of the total population, of which those aged 65 and above were 63,875, accounting for 11.48% of the total population. The urban population was 530,877, accounting for 95.37% of the total population; the rural population was 25,744, accounting for 4.63% of the total population.

=== Ethnic groups ===
Among the permanent resident population, the Han ethnic group numbered 517,607, accounting for 92.99%; the Mongols ethnic group numbered 22,091, accounting for 3.97%; other ethnic minorities numbered 16,923, accounting for 3.04%. Compared with the 2010 Sixth National Population Census, the Han population increased by 20,882 people, a growth of 4.2%, but its share of the total population decreased by 0.22 percentage points. The combined population of all ethnic minorities increased by 2,837 people, a growth of 7.84%, and their share of the total population increased by 0.22 percentage points. Specifically, the Mongols population increased by 3,139 people, a growth of 16.56%, and its share of the total population increased by 0.41 percentage points; the Hui population decreased by 1,331 people, a decline of 11.35%, and its share of the total population decreased by .33 percentage points.

Wuhai's population is predominantly composed of immigrants. Hainan District has a significant number of immigrants from Henan Province.

	population	share
Han	400,971	93.78%
Mongols	13,904	3.25%
Hui	7,944	1.86%
Manchu	4,063	0.95%
Daur	129	0.03%
Koreans	98	0.02%
Tibetans	87	0.02%
Zhuang	68	0.02%
Xibe	56	0.01%
Other	233	0.06%

== Administrative subdivisions ==
Wuhai city is divided into three districts:

Map
#	Name	Mongolian	Hanzi	Hanyu Pinyin	Population (2010)	Area (km^{2})	Density (/km^{2})
1	Haibowan District	ᠬᠠᠶᠢᠷᠤᠪ ᠤᠨ ᠲᠣᠬᠣᠢ ᠲᠣᠭᠣᠷᠢᠭ (Qayirub-un Toqoi toɣoriɣ)	海勃湾区	Hǎibówān Qū	296,177	529	378
2	Hainan District	ᠬᠠᠶᠢᠨᠠᠨ ᠲᠣᠭᠣᠷᠢᠭ (Qayinan toɣoriɣ)	海南区	Hǎinán Qū	103,355	1,005	100
3	Wuda District	ᠤᠳᠠ ᠲᠣᠭᠣᠷᠢᠭ (Uda toɣoriɣ)	乌达区	Wūdá Qū	133,370	220	591

== Geography ==
=== Location ===
Wuhai is situated in western Inner Mongolia, in the upper reaches of the Yellow River, which flows through the city. The western bank of the river is Wuda District, while the eastern bank includes Haibowan District and Hainan District. The city borders Ordos City in Inner Mongolia to the east and north, Shizuishan City in Ningxia to the south, and the Alxa League of Inner Mongolia to the west. Located in a transitional zone between desertified grasslands and grassland-desert ecosystems, Wuhai has an average elevation of 1,150 meters.

=== Topography ===
Wuhai lies in the upper Yellow River basin, flanked by the Ordos Plateau to the east, the Alashan Plateau to the west, and the Hetao Plain to the north. It serves as a convergence point between North China and Northwest China. The eastern part of the city is dominated by the Zhuozi Mountain, the central area by the Gandyer Mountain Range, and the western region by the Wuhu Mountain—all northern extensions of the Helan Mountains. These three parallel mountain ranges run north–south, forming two flat valleys between them. The Yellow River flows through the western valley of the Gander Mountains, preventing the Ulan Buh Desert from encroaching into the Hetao region. Wuhai's topography is characterized by higher elevations in the east and west and lower elevations in the center.

Geologically, tectonically Erosion medium-low mountains account for 40% of Wuhai's total area, denuded hills make up 20%, alluvial-Pluvial fan zones at the mountain foothills cover 30%, and Yellow River fluvial terraces occupy the remaining 10%.

=== Climate ===
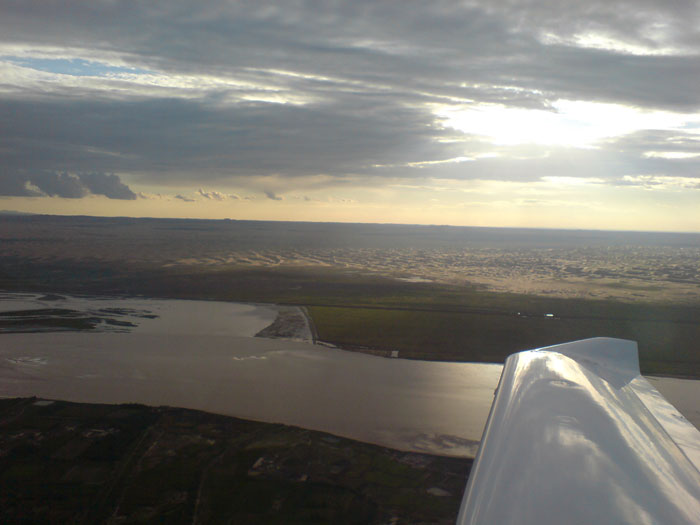
Eagle-eye view above Wuhai airport on the Yellow River. Visible sharp transition into Gobi desert dunes from the West side of the city

Wuhai experiences a cool arid climate (Köppen: BWk), characterized by freezing, dry winters and hot summers. Spring is dry, with occasional dust storms, followed by early summer heat waves. Summer tends to be hot with the greatest precipitation occurring in July and August. Because of the aridity, there tends to be considerable diurnal variation in temperature, except during the summer. The monthly 24-hour average temperature range from −8.1 °C or 17.4 °F in January to 26.1 °C or 79.0 °F in July, while the annual mean is 10.1 °C or 50.2 °F. Approximately 45 percent of the average annual precipitation falls in July and August.

Climate data for Wuhai, elevation 1,106 m (3,629 ft), (1991–2020 normals)
Month	Jan	Feb	Mar	Apr	May	Jun	Jul	Aug	Sep	Oct	Nov	Dec	Year
Record high °C (°F)	12.0 (53.6)	18.9 (66.0)	26.0 (78.8)	36.4 (97.5)	36.3 (97.3)	38.8 (101.8)	41.0 (105.8)	39.1 (102.4)	37.6 (99.7)	28.2 (82.8)	22.2 (72.0)	15.2 (59.4)	41.0 (105.8)
Mean daily maximum °C (°F)	−1.5 (29.3)	4.0 (39.2)	12.0 (53.6)	20.4 (68.7)	26.3 (79.3)	30.9 (87.6)	33.0 (91.4)	30.8 (87.4)	25.0 (77.0)	17.9 (64.2)	8.3 (46.9)	−0.1 (31.8)	17.3 (63.0)
Daily mean °C (°F)	−9.5 (14.9)	−4.4 (24.1)	4.0 (39.2)	12.9 (55.2)	19.1 (66.4)	24.1 (75.4)	26.3 (79.3)	24.0 (75.2)	17.8 (64.0)	9.6 (49.3)	0.9 (33.6)	−7.4 (18.7)	9.8 (49.6)
Mean daily minimum °C (°F)	−15.4 (4.3)	−10.9 (12.4)	−3 (27)	5.2 (41.4)	11.3 (52.3)	16.7 (62.1)	19.6 (67.3)	17.7 (63.9)	11.7 (53.1)	3.3 (37.9)	−4.5 (23.9)	−12.9 (8.8)	3.2 (37.9)
Record low °C (°F)	−28.9 (−20.0)	−27.5 (−17.5)	−19.6 (−3.3)	−9.5 (14.9)	−1.2 (29.8)	7.5 (45.5)	12.1 (53.8)	8.9 (48.0)	−1.7 (28.9)	−9.4 (15.1)	−16.9 (1.6)	−26.2 (−15.2)	−28.9 (−20.0)
Average precipitation mm (inches)	0.9 (0.04)	2.1 (0.08)	4.0 (0.16)	6.7 (0.26)	15.1 (0.59)	22.4 (0.88)	33.7 (1.33)	33.8 (1.33)	27.0 (1.06)	8.2 (0.32)	3.5 (0.14)	1.2 (0.05)	158.6 (6.24)
Average precipitation days (≥ 0.1 mm)	1.3	1.3	1.7	2.2	4.3	5.7	7.2	6.9	5.5	2.7	1.5	1.2	41.5
Average snowy days	2.5	2.1	1.5	0.4	0.1	0.0	0.0	0.0	0.0	0.7	1.7	2.0	11
Average relative humidity (%)	51	42	33	28	30	36	44	48	50	42	53	44	42
Mean monthly sunshine hours	206.1	216.4	259.0	278.9	315.0	306.6	302.5	288.7	251.8	254.2	217.7	200.4	3,097.3
Percentage possible sunshine	68	71	69	70	71	69	67	69	68	75	74	69	70
Source: China Meteorological Administration

== Economy ==
The city's economy is heavily based on coal mining, electric power generation, metal-working and chemical industries, but also on fruit (grapes, winemaking) and dairy farming. Wuhai is a stop on the Baotou-Lanzhou rail line, and an airport was opened in 2003.

=== Industry ===
Wuhai's industrial economy began with coal mining, and in its early years, coal was the dominant industry. With the implementation of China Western Development, the city gradually established a diversified industrial system centered on coal chemicals, chlor-alkali chemicals, construction materials, and steel metallurgy. By 2015, these four pillar industries and their supporting sectors accounted for 95% of the city's total industrial output. The local coal conversion rate increased significantly—from less than 20% in 1976 to over 90% in 2015.

To reduce its reliance on coal resources, Wuhai began developing strategic emerging industries. The city has promoted resource conservation, intensive utilization, and circular development. It has focused on building industrial clusters for new energy—such as the complete photovoltaic (solar power) industry chain and battery production—as well as for new materials, including biodegradable materials and organosilicon products. Notably, the world's largest integrated BDO (1,4-butanediol) production facility has been completed and is now operational.

As of 2021, emerging industries accounted for 23% of Wuhai's total industrial output, reflecting the city's gradual shift toward a more sustainable and diversified economic structure.

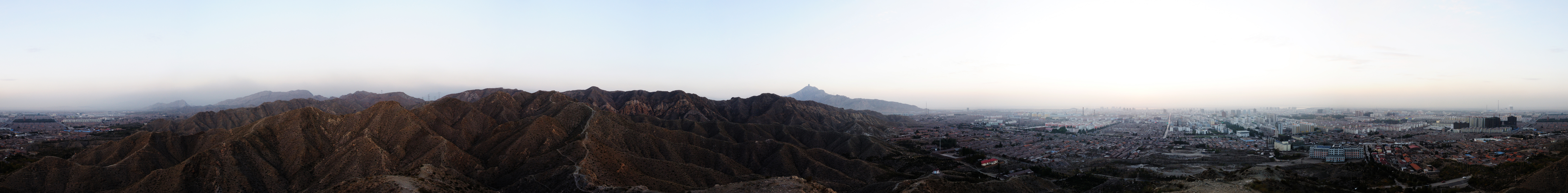
Wuhai Panorama view from East Mountain

=== Beijing PanAm International Aviation Academy (BPIAA) ===
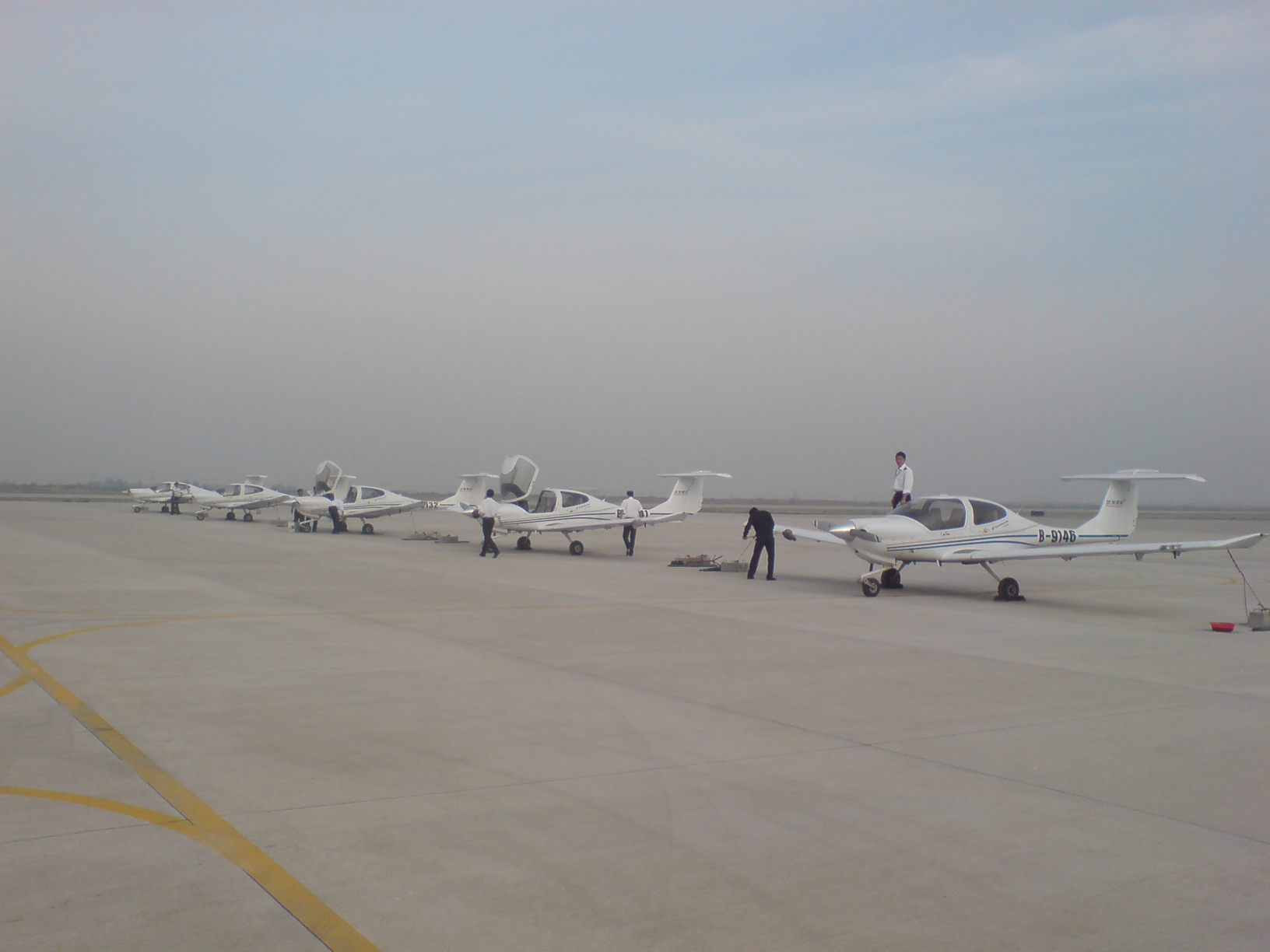
Beijing PanAm International Aviation Academy DA40's

Although Wuhai in general is lacking large higher educational institutions, in the early 2007 a major foreign investment was injected into the development of a local flight training base for Chinese airline cadets located in Wuhai Regional Airport (ICAO abbrev. "ZBUH"). The flight base has 8 to 14 Diamond DA40 light training aircraft providing flight lessons for over 130 students designated to train at this base. Convenient airport location close to the city, low levels of pollution and relatively fair weather/visibility factors allow flight training approximately 300 days per year (subject to military restrictions). The arrival of Beijing Panam International Aviation Academy also laid a foundation for the first ever foreign community in Wuhai, composed mostly of foreign Flight Instructors from various ICAO countries working on annual contracts for BPIAA.

At the end of 2008, following the World economic recession, the company, previously belonging to an American AIG Insurance Corporation, fell into financial difficulties and stopped operating awaiting injection of the new investment funds either from the Chinese government or independent investors.

=== Desert Wine ===
Wuhai is the core production area for "Wuhai Desert Wine," a product with a protected geographical indication (PGI). The vineyards are cultivated in a harsh desert environment, with the Huang River providing irrigation, resulting in wines with a distinct local character recognized by Chinese authorities.

== Transportation ==
Wuhai is served by Wuhai Airport with flights to Beijing, Shanghai, Guangzhou and other cities.

The under-construction Baotou–Yinchuan high-speed railway will provide connections to Baotou and Yinchuan at a design speed of 250 km/h.

Wuhai lies on a major Yellow River train route, connecting a large number of cities in Inner Mongolia, central and southern China. Travel time from Beijing by train is approximately 20 hours and from Baotou about a 4-hour train journey.

The Wuhai Yellow River Road Bridge is one of the Yellow River crossings in the city.

Wuhai is located at the junction of North China and Northwest China, serving as an important transportation hub between the two regions.

Highways

- G6 Beijing–Lhasa Expressway Enters the city from the north of Haibowan District, passes through Hainan District, crosses the Yellow River, and reaches Wusitai Town in Alxa Left Banner.
- G18 Rongcheng–Wuhai Expressway Connects Rongcheng to Wuhai.
- G1816 Wuhai–Maqên Expressway Connects Wuhai to Maqên County.
- China National Highway 110 (G110) Passes through Haibowan District and Wuda District.
- China National Highway 109(G109) Passes through Gongwusu Town and Lasengmiao Town in Hainan District, entering Qipanjing Town in Ordos.
- National Highway 244 (G244) Connects Wuhai to Chongqing.

Railways

- Baotou–Lanzhou Railway The first railway in Wuhai, running parallel to National Highway 110. Stations along the line include Wuhai East Station, Wuhai West Station, Wuhai North Station, and Huangbaici Station.
- Haigong Railway
- Jilantai Line
- Dongwu Railway Connects Dongsheng to Wuhai, completed and opened to traffic in 2008.
- Baotou–Yinchuan high-speed railway Construction began in August 2018.2024.10.1 has been officially opened for operation

Aviation

Wuhai Airport was opened to air traffic in December 2003. It is located 15 kilometers north of Wuhai city and is classified as a 3C-level flight zone. The terminal building covers an area of 12,500 square meters. The airport currently operates routes to Hohhot, Beijing, Xi'an, Guangzhou, Shanghai, Baotou, Yulin, Yinchuan, Taiyuan, Haikou, Ordos, Shijiazhuang, Hangzhou, and Chengdu.

== Cuisine ==
Wuhai's dining scene consists of numerous small bars and restaurants, catering for a range of Chinese, Mongolian and western cuisines. Popular dishes include:

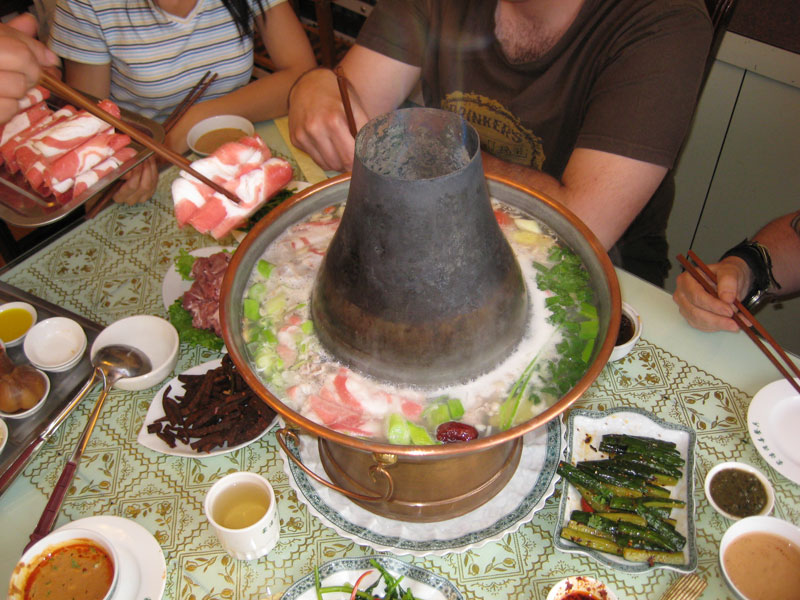
Mongolian style traditional coal-heated Hot pot "Huo-Guo" dining

Hot pot serving a type of Chinese meat and vegetable fondue in a traditional "uni-pot" way or a modern "personal pot" styles. Pots are filled with either creamy or spicy soups and set on fire which is built into the table. Thinly-sliced meat, vegetables and flat noodles are served uncooked. It is up to the customer to add the ingredients to the hot-pot sitting on the table where it's cooked in seconds.

Mongolian BBQ serving a variety of meats (mostly beef, lamb, and chicken) roasted on open fire and seasoned with local spices.

Traditional Chinese Han restaurants are widely available. Serving a great variety of noodles and rather oily meat dishes.

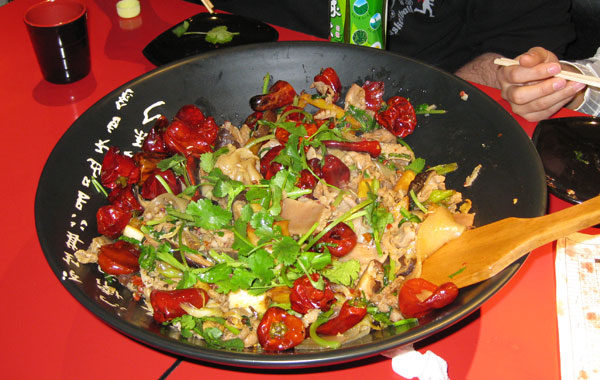
Mongolian "Mn-Mye". A mixture of flat noodles, vegetables, meat and seafood. Hundreds of variations - made to order in minutes in many Wuhai restaurants

Mongolian Mn-Mye dishes, served in a large traditional wok for the whole table to share. Hundreds of ingredient combinations could be ordered by a customer by ticking boxes on a menu order form while visiting these specialist restaurants. Once ordered, the Mn-Mye chef combines the requested ingredients in a wok, adds fresh chilly peppers, ginger, garlic, coriander and other indigenous spices.

Western restaurants, serving a variety of foods catering for the European and American tastes are also available.

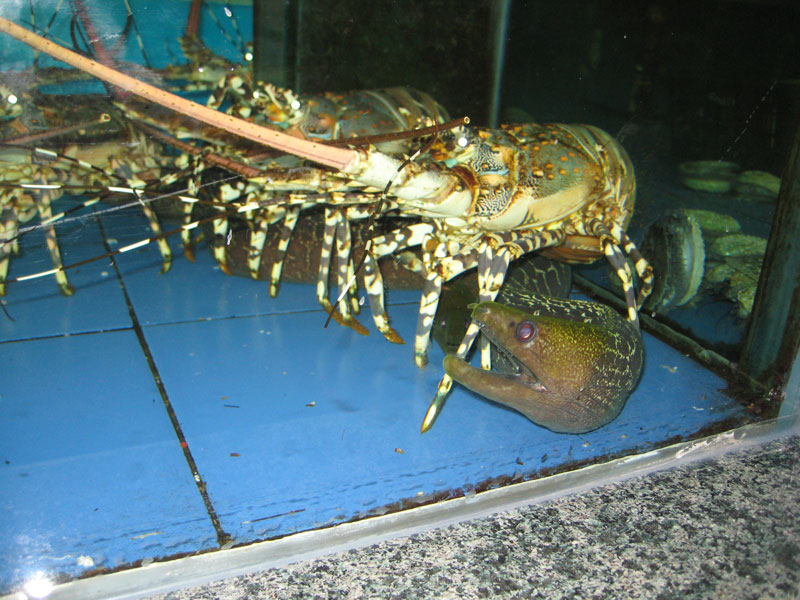
One of the seafood restaurants in Wuhai, keeping live stock of exotic fish

== Recreation and sports ==
A number of very modern gyms with an average membership fee between $40 and US$60 per months are available for use in the city center and other convenient locations. A modern round mini-stadium building, located in the middle of town, offers new tennis and basketball playgrounds as well as some ThaiJi and KungFu classes.

Mountain climbing is extremely popular activity among the locals and foreigners alike. There is a long mountain ridge located to the south-east of the city, a short walk away from its SE corner. Mountain peaks range from 400m AGL to 700m AGL and take approximately 1 to 2 hours to conquer, depending on your physical abilities. Beginner level climbers are likely to enjoy this hike. For the more advanced mountaineers, the highest peak to the south of the city is standing almost 1000m AGL tall and may be a little more challenging to climb. The city charges no fees for mountain-climbing activities and welcomes anyone to try.

A full-size western-style bowling alley is located in the NW part of the city, near a central street roundabout.

Rock art in six places at the foot of the Zhuozi Shan (Mount Zhuozhi) has been dated back to the Xia, Shang, and Zhou dynasties, the Warring States period, and the Han dynasty.It is a national key cultural relic protection unit.

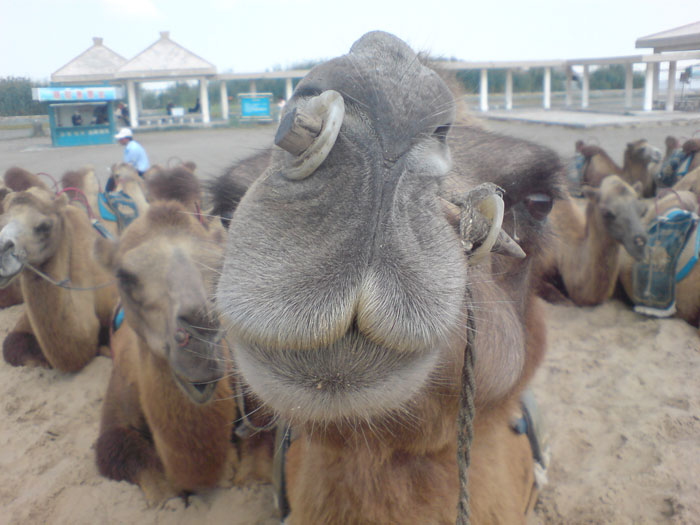
Domesticated Bactrian camels of the Gobi Desert used for camel-rides and guest entertainment at a local desert theme park
