= G7 Beijing–Ürümqi Expressway =

Expressway in Beijing, Hebei, Shanxi, Inner Mongolia, Gansu and Xinjiang of China

Beijing–Ürümqi Expressway
- 北京－乌鲁木齐高速公路
- Jingxin Expressway; Chinese: 京新高速公路
- The expressway is highlighted in red and purple.

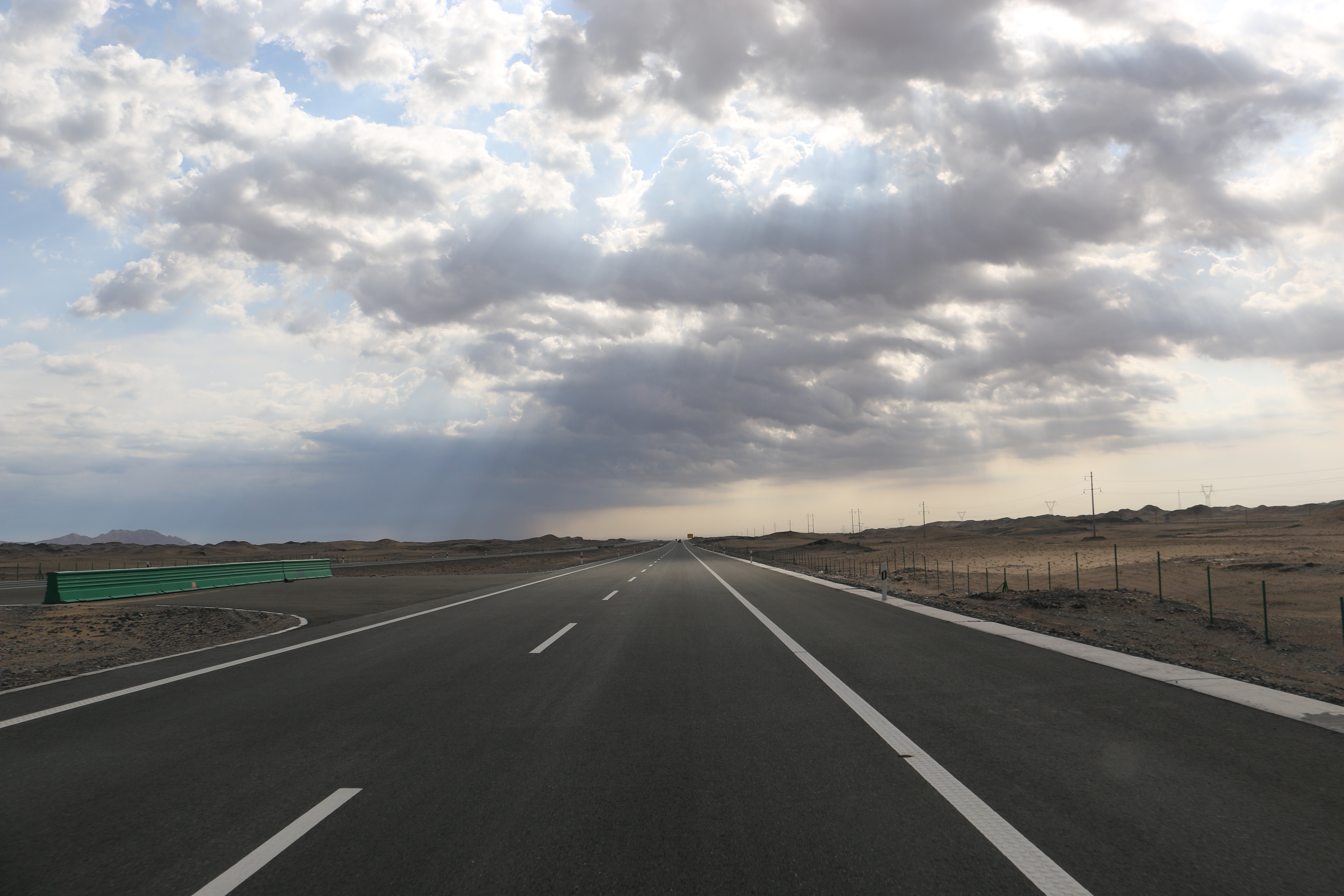
- G7 in Inner Mongolia

Route information
- Length: 2,540 km (1,580 mi) Completed length.

Major junctions
- East end: S50 in Haidian, BJ
- G4501 in Changping, BJ; G6 in Changping, BJ; G6 in Zhangjiakou, HE; G95 in Zhangjiakou, HE; G6 in Zhangjiakou, HE; G55 in Ulanqab, NM; G6 in Ulanqab, NM; G6 / G0601 (E / NE) in Hohhot, NM; G0601 (NW) in Hohhot, NM; G65 in Baotou, NM; G6 (W); G30 (E) in Hami, XJ; G3012 in Turpan, XJ; G30 / G3001 (W / ) in Ürümqi, XJ
- West end: Inner Ring Road in Ürümqi, XJ

Location
- Country: China

Highway system
- National Trunk Highway System; Primary; Auxiliary; National Highways; Transport in China
← G0616	→ G0711

The Beijing–Ürümqi Expressway (Chinese: 北京－乌鲁木齐高速公路), designated as G7 and commonly referred to as the Jingxin Expressway (Chinese: 京新高速公路) is an expressway that connects the cities of Beijing, China, and Ürümqi, Xinjiang. It opened in July 2017 measuring 2,540 km (1,580 mi) in length. It is noted for being the world's longest desert highway, passing through several deserts part of the Gobi Desert, such as the Ulan Buh Desert, the Tengger Desert and the Badain Jaran Desert.

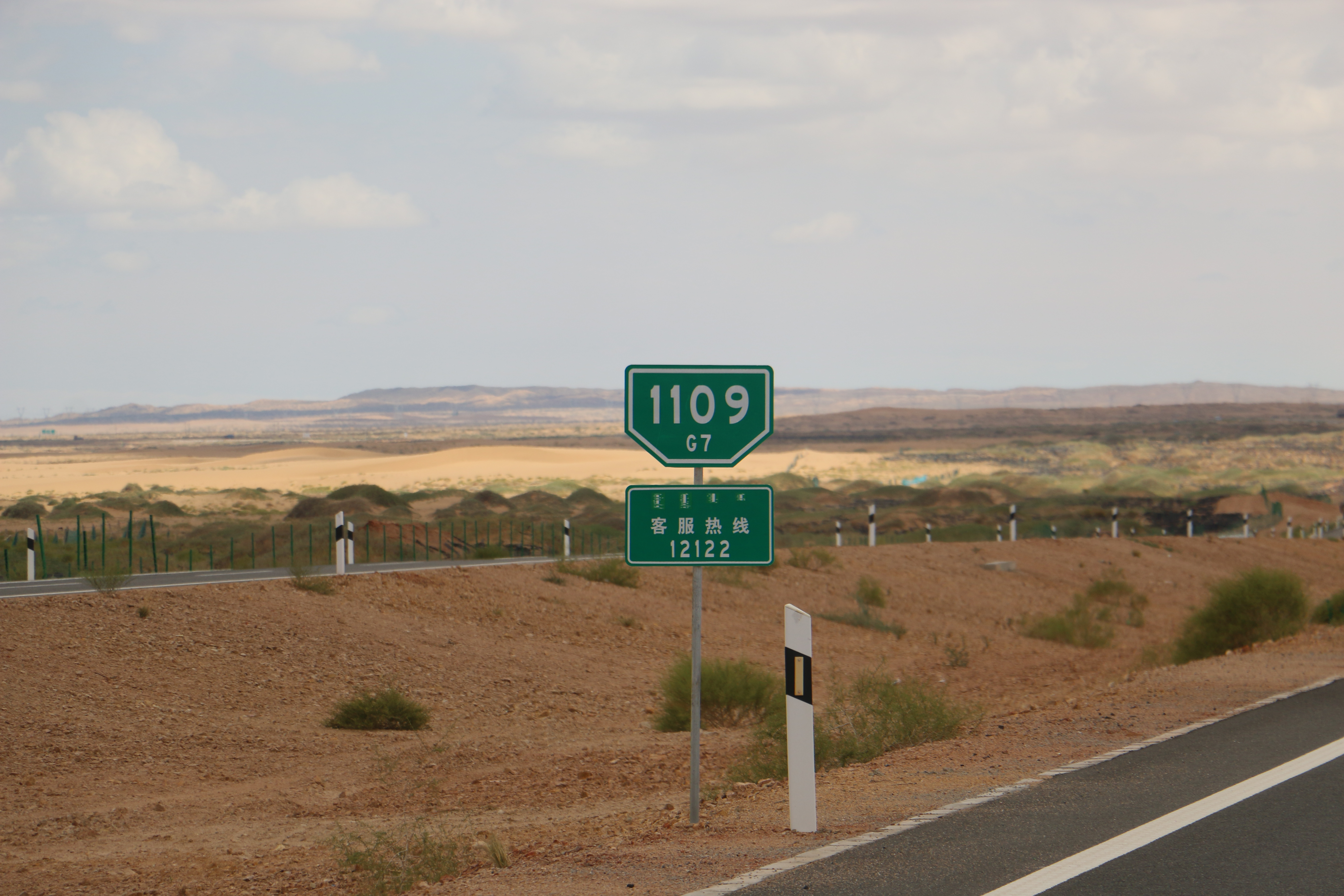
G7 1109km

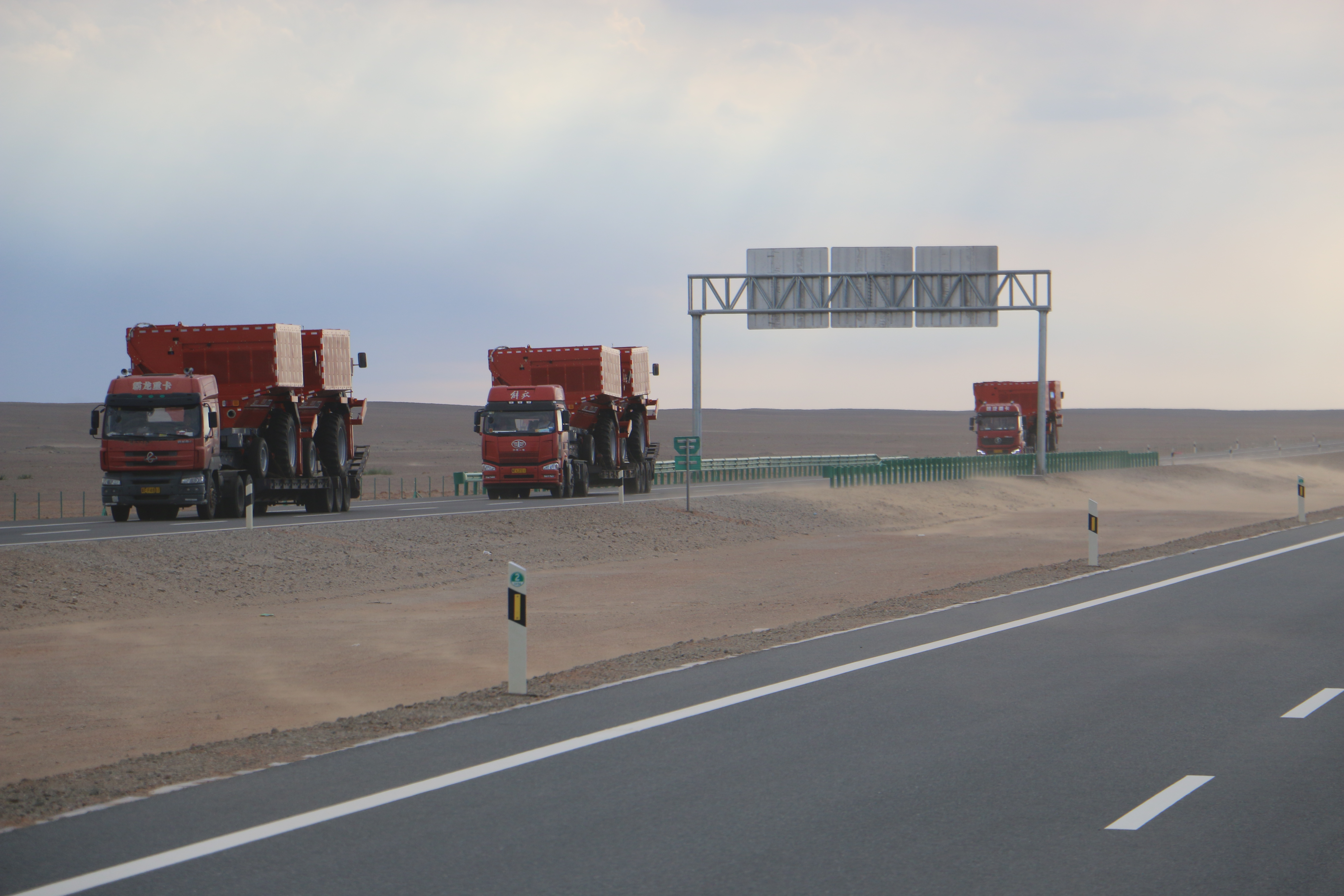
Trucks on G7

China Expwy G7 sign with name in Uyghur language

China Expwy G7 sign terminal

China Expwy G7 sign with no name

China Expwy G7 sign with name

== Description ==
The expressway was known as the Jingbao Expressway (Chinese: 京包高速公路; pinyin: Jīngbāo Gāosùgōnglù). It begins at Louzizhuang Village (娄子庄村委会 in Machikou, Changping, Beijing, Beijing. In 2008, villagers at Taipingzhuang Village (太平庄村 in Nankou heaped mounds of dirt and rocks to prevent construction, stating the compensation they received for the government's taking their land was insufficient.

It is the first full expressway to link central Beijing, alongside the Badaling Expressway, directly to the city of Baotou in Inner Mongolia. It passes through the major urban areas of Zhangjiakou, Datong, and Hohhot. It eases traffic on China National Highway 110, which was previously the only trunk road headed for Baotou from the national capital.

== Detailed itinerary ==
From Beijing
	Yuequan Road
1 A-B	N S50 5th Ring Road
2	Shangdi S Road; Aningzhuang W Road; Zhufang Road
6	Shangdi W Road; Houchangcun Road Xi'erqi Station
8	G7 Side Road
10	Beiqing Road
12	Yuhe S Road
Shahe Toll Station
15	Shayang Highway; Shahe-Yangfang
Beijing Metropolitan Area
18	X006 Road; Shahe
21 A-B	North G4501 6th Ring Road
24	X034 Road; Changping
28 A-B	G6 Jingla Expressway; G110 Road; Changping Ming Tombs Station Ming tombs
31	X029 Road; Towards Nankou-Jiantou Changping Xishankou Station
Taipingzhuang Toll Station
Service Area
	G110 Road
Only lane towards Beijing completed Lane from Beijing continues on G110 Road
Lianhuatan Toll Station
Continues as G110 Road; G110 Traffic towards beijing have option to go on G7
	G110 Road
Jingjiatai Service Area
	S323 Road; Yanqing-Yongning
68	G110 Road; Yanqing
83	G110 Road; Zhangshanying
Toll Station
Beijing City; Hebei Province
Beijing Toll Station
92	G110 Road; Beixinbao
Shacheng Service Area
(96)	G7 Jingla Expressway; G110 Road; Tumu-Huailai
	G110 Road; Huailai-Dongbali
Yanghe Service Area
	G95 Capital Ring Expressway
	S342 Road; Xiahuayuan
	X445 Road; Towards G110 Road; Xinzhuangzi-Xuanhua
	S32 Xuanda Expressway
	S10 Zhangshi Expressway
Hebei Province; Shanxi Province
	S45 Tianli Expressway
Shanxi Province; Inner Mongolia Autonomous Region
Toll Station
	X565 Road; Baijiaying
Service Area
	X574 Road; Towards Longshengzhuang-Xinghe
	S24 Xinba Expressway
	S54 Jining City Ring Expressway
	Chaha'er Ave; Towards Jining-Tuguiwula
	G55 Erguang Expressway
	G110 Road; Shibatai
	X553 Road; X560 Road; Baiyinxile
	X553 Road
Service Area
	S22 Hubai Expressway
	S105 Road; Qixiaying
Hohhot Metropolitan Area
Service Area
(1 A-B)	G6 Jingla Expressway; G0601 Hohhot Ring Expressway
Concurrent with G6 Jingla Expressway; Concurrent with G0601 Hohhot Ring Expressway
	S101 Road; Towards G110 Road; Hohhot-Centre
(480)	S104 Road; Hohhot-Centre; Towards Wuchuan
Hohhot Metropolitan Area
(489)	G110 Road; Hohhot-West; Taigemu
Concurrent with G0601 Hohhot Ring Expressway
(61)	G0601 Hohhot Ring Expressway
Service Area
(509)	G110 Road; Bikeqi
(521)	G110 Road; Chasuqi
Hasuhai Service Area
(543)	G110 Road; Taosihao
	G110 Road; Meidaizhao
(579)	G110 Road; Tumed Youqi
Baotou Metropolitan Area
	G65 Baomao Expressway
	G110 Road; X606 Road; Baotou-Centre
(629)	G210 Road; Baotou-Centre
(645)	G110 Road; Baotou-Centre
(655)	G110 Road; Baotou-Centre
(663)	G110 Road; Baotou-West
Baotou Metropolitan Area
Baiyanhua Service Area
	G110 Road; Baiyanhua
	G110 Road; Gongmiaozi
Wulashan (Mt Urad) Service Area
	G110 Road; Urad Qianqi
Xixiaozhao Service Area
	X708 Road; Xixiaozhao
(807)	S211 Road; Wuyuan
	G110 Road; Bayannur
Concurrent with G6 Jingla Expressway
	G6 Jingla Expressway
	S213 Road; Hanggin Hanggin - Urad Houqi
Service Area
	X715 Road; S312 Road; Dashuwan - Huhuwendu'er
	Hatengtaohai
	X757 Road; Aolunbuge
	X755 Road
	S312 Road; Towards S218 Road; Wuliji
	S312 Road; Suhongtu
	S312 Road
	S312 Road
	S312 Road; Ejin-East
	S315 Road; Ejin-South
	S312 Road; S214 Road; Saihantoulai
	Heiyangshan Mining Complex
Inner Mongolia Autonomous Region; Gansu Province
Liangpingchuan Service Area
	S216 Road; Mazongshan
Mazongshan Service Area
	X244 Road; Mingshui
Gansu Province; Xinjiang Uyghur Autonomous Region
	Expressway to Ürümqi (G335 Road) (To be renamed)
	Jing'erquan
Service Area
(2963)	G30 Lianhuo Expressway; G312 Road; Luotuo Quanzi
Concurrent with G30 Lianhuo Expressway; Concurrent with G312 Road
Luotuo Quanzi Service Area
Olatay (Wulatai) Service Area
	Olatay (Wulatai)
(2975)	X510 Road; Qizil Yultuz (Hongxing) 4 farms
	Bulung Toghraq (Daquanwan)
Concurrent with G312 Road
(2999)	G312 Road; Qumul (Hami) Airport; Qumul (Hami)
Qumul (Hami) Service Area
	S303 Road; Qumul (Hami)
(3021)	S203 Road; Qumul (Hami)
(3044)	G312 Road; Qumul (Hami) - Huoshiquan
Concurrent with G312 Road
(3053)	Astana (Erpu)
Astana (Erpu) Toll Station
Astana (Erpu) Service Area
(3062)	X094 Road; Dawalduruk (Dewaidurukesake) - Shishan (Xishan)
(3080)	X518 Road Liushuquan South Railway Station Liushuquan
(3087)	
Concurrent with G312 Road
	G312 Road; Sandaoling
	G312 Road; Sandaoling
Concurrent with G312 Road
Tiziquan Parking Area
(3117)	
Liaodun Parking Area
Yiwanquan Service Area
(3198)	S238 Road; Yatta Quduq (Qijuejing)
Sha'erhu Service Area
Pichan (Shanshan) - East Toll Station
Concurrent with G312 Road
(3279)	G312 Road; S214 Road
Nanhu Service Area
	X069 Road; Chiqtim (Qiketai)
(3310)	X064 Road; G312 Road; Pichan (Shanshan) - East
(3327)	Pichan (Shanshan)
	G312 Road; Lamjin (Lianmuqin)
Concurrent with G312 Road
Tuyugou Service Area
Concurrent with G312 Road
	G312 Road; Singgim (Shengjin)
	S202 Road; Turpan Jiaohe Airport Turpan North Railway Station Turpan
	G312 Road; S301 Road; Dakheyan (Daheyan)
Concurrent with G312 Road
	G3012 Tuhe Expressway; G314 Road
Concurrent with G312 Road
	G312 Road; G314 Road
Xiancaohu Service Area
Parcha Saghal (Pa'erqia Sagale) Toll Station
	G312 Road; G314 Road; Dawancheng (Dabancheng)
(3517)	G312 Road; Dawancheng (Dabancheng)
Tuzkul (Yanhu) Service Area
(3526)	G312 Road; G314 Road; Tuzkul (Yanhu) Industrial Zone
Tuzkul (Yanhu) Toll Station
(3552)	G312 Road Bayang River Ditch (Teraksay) Saywupa (Chaiwopu)
(3569)	G312 Road; G314 Road; Fertilizer Factory
	S103 Road
Ürümqi Metropolitan Area
Toll Station
	S116 Road; Shuixigou
Concurrent with G30 Lianhuo Expressway
	G30 Lianhuo Expressway; Ürümqi Ring Expressway; Khetan (Hetan) South Express road Ürümqi - Centre
Towards Beijing
