= Nanshao =

Nanshao may refer to:

- Nanshao Station (南邵), on line 8 of the Beijing Subway, China
- Nanshao, Beijing (南邵), in Changping district, Beijing, China
- Nanshao, Liaoning (南哨), a township in the Harqin Left Wing Mongol Autonomous County, Liaoning Province, China
