= Nanshao, Beijing =

Nanshao Town 南邵镇
- Town
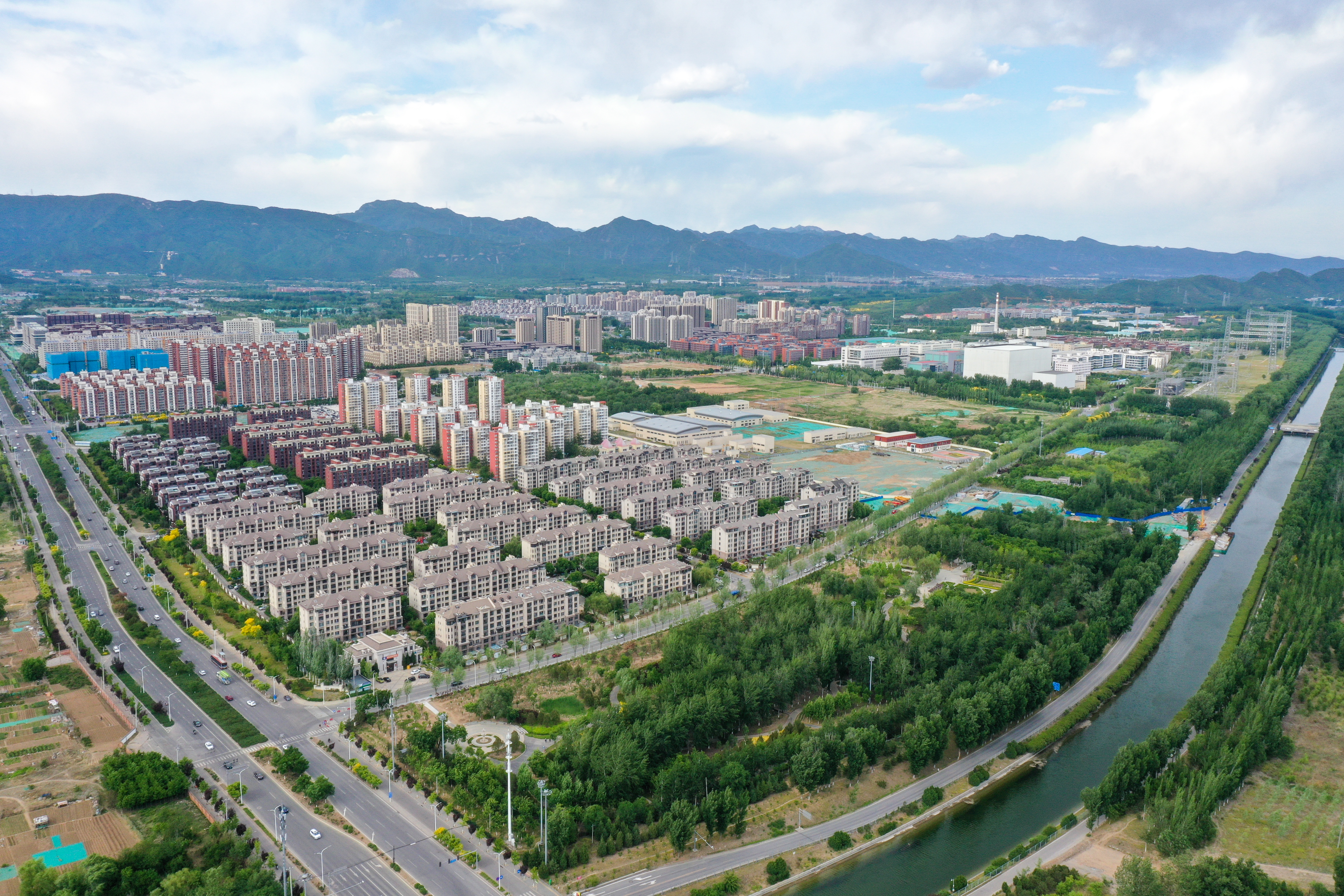
- Aerial view of Nanshao Town, 2022

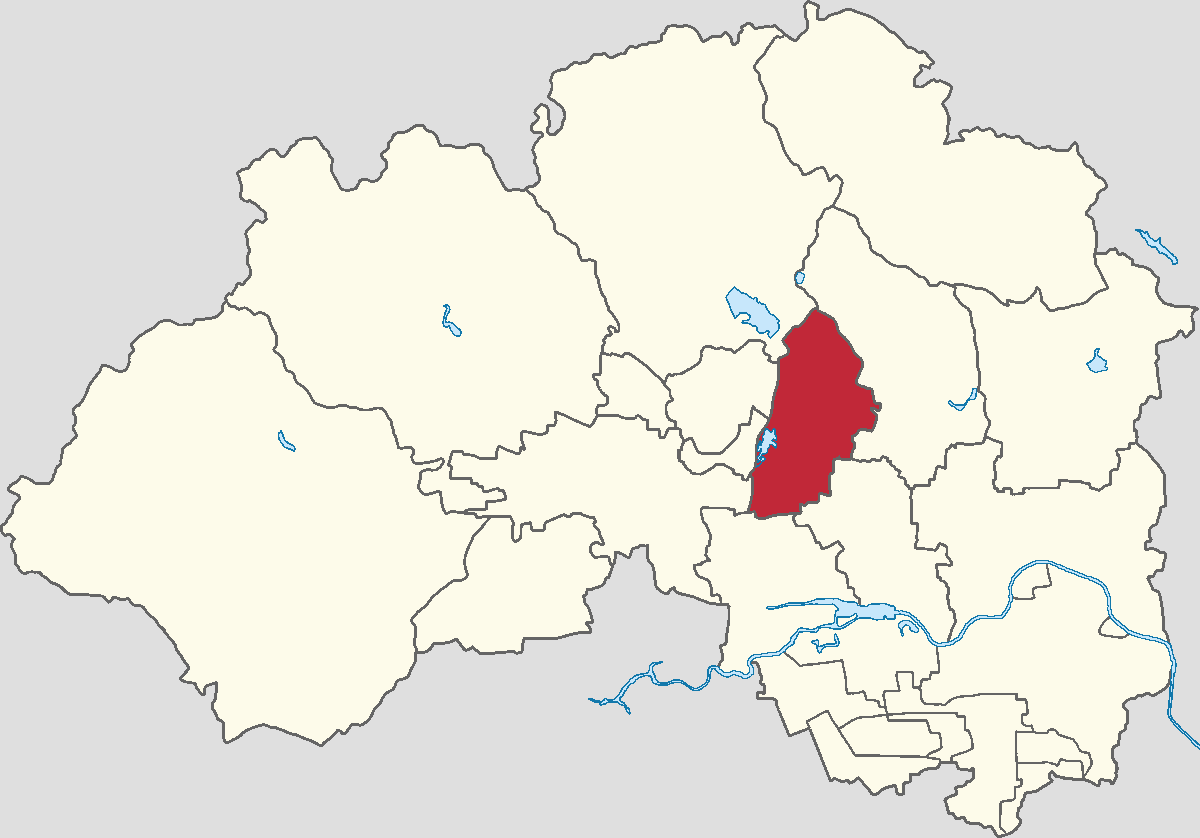
- Location of Nanshao Town in Changping District

- Location within Beijing Location within China
- Coordinates: 40°12′21″N 116°16′47″E
- Country: China
- Municipality: Beijing
- District: Changping
- Village-level Divisions: 10 communities 16 villages

Area
  - Total: 36.03 km^{2} (13.91 sq mi)
- Elevation: 61 m (200 ft)

Population (2020)
  - Total: 65,403
  - Density: 1,815/km^{2} (4,701/sq mi)
- Time zone: UTC+8 (China Standard)
- Postal code: 102206
- Area code: 010

Nanshao Town (simplified Chinese: 南邵镇; traditional Chinese: 南邵鎮; pinyin: Nánshào Zhèn) is a town located in the eastern side of Changping District, Beijing, China. It shares border with Shisanling Town to its north, Cuicun Town to its east, Baishan and Shahe Towns to its south, Machikou Town to its southwest, and Chengnan and Chengbei Subdistricts to its west. In 2020, the town had a total population of 65,403.

== History ==
History of Nanshao Town
Year	Status	Under
1949–1953	Nanshao Village	Changping County
1953–1956	1st District	Changping County
1956–1958	Nanshao Township	Changping County
1958–1959	Nanshao Working Station, part of Shisanling People's Commune	Changping County
1959–1960	Nanshao Management Area, part of Chengguan People's Commune	Changping County
1960–1961	Nanshao Production Team, part of Chengguan People's Commune	Changping County
1961–1982	Nanshao People's Commune	Changping County
1982–1997	Nanshao Township	Changping County
1997–1999	Nanshao Town	Changping County
1999–present	Nanshao Town	Changping District

== Administrative divisions ==
By the end of 2021, Nanshao Town consisted of 26 subdivisions, including 10 communities, and 16 villages:

Administrative division code	Subdivision names	Name transliteration	Type
110114111001	北郡嘉源社区	Beijunjiayuansheqv	Community
110114111002	长滩庭苑社区	Changtantingyuan	Community
110114111003	廊桥水岸社区	Langqiaoshui'an	Community
110114111004	国惠村社区	Guohuicunsheqv	Community
110114111005	路劲家园社区	Lujingjiayuansheqv	Community
110114111006	风景丽苑社区	Fengjingliyuansheqv	Community
110114111007	麓鸣花园社区	Luminghuayuansheqv	Community
110114111008	青秀尚城一区社区	Qingxiushangchengyiqusheqv	Community
110114111009	桥东社区	Qiaodongsheqv	Community
110114111010	青秀尚城二区社区	Qingxiushangchengerqusheqv	Community
110114111201	南邵村	Nanshaocun	Village
110114111202	姜屯村	Jiangtuncun	Village
110114111203	张各庄村	Zhanggezhuangcun	Village
110114111204	景文屯村	Jingwentuncun	Village
110114111205	纪窑村	Jiyaocun	Village
110114111206	金家坟村	Jinjiafencun	Village
110114111207	辛庄村	Xinzhuangcun	Village
110114111208	四合庄村	Sihezhuangcun	Village
110114111209	东营村	Dongyingcun	Village
110114111210	张营村	Zhangyingcun	Village
110114111211	何营村	Heyingcun	Village
110114111212	小北哨村	Xiaobeishaocun	Village
110114111213	北邵洼村	Beishaowacun	Village
110114111214	官高村	Guangaocun	Village
110114111215	三合庄村	Sanhezhuangcun	Village
110114111216	营坊村	Yingfangcun	Village

== Gallery ==
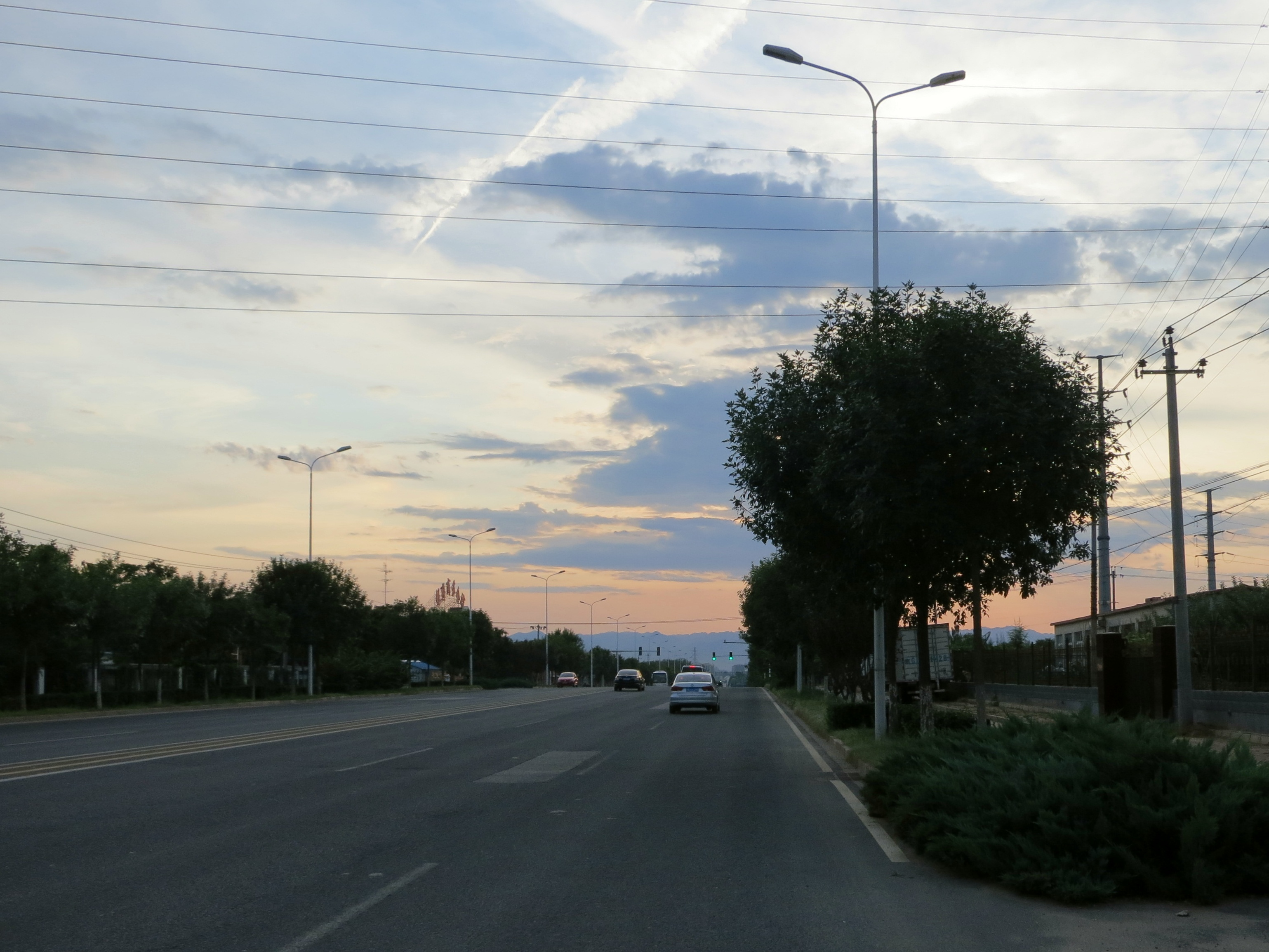
Changcui Road on the north of the town, 2015

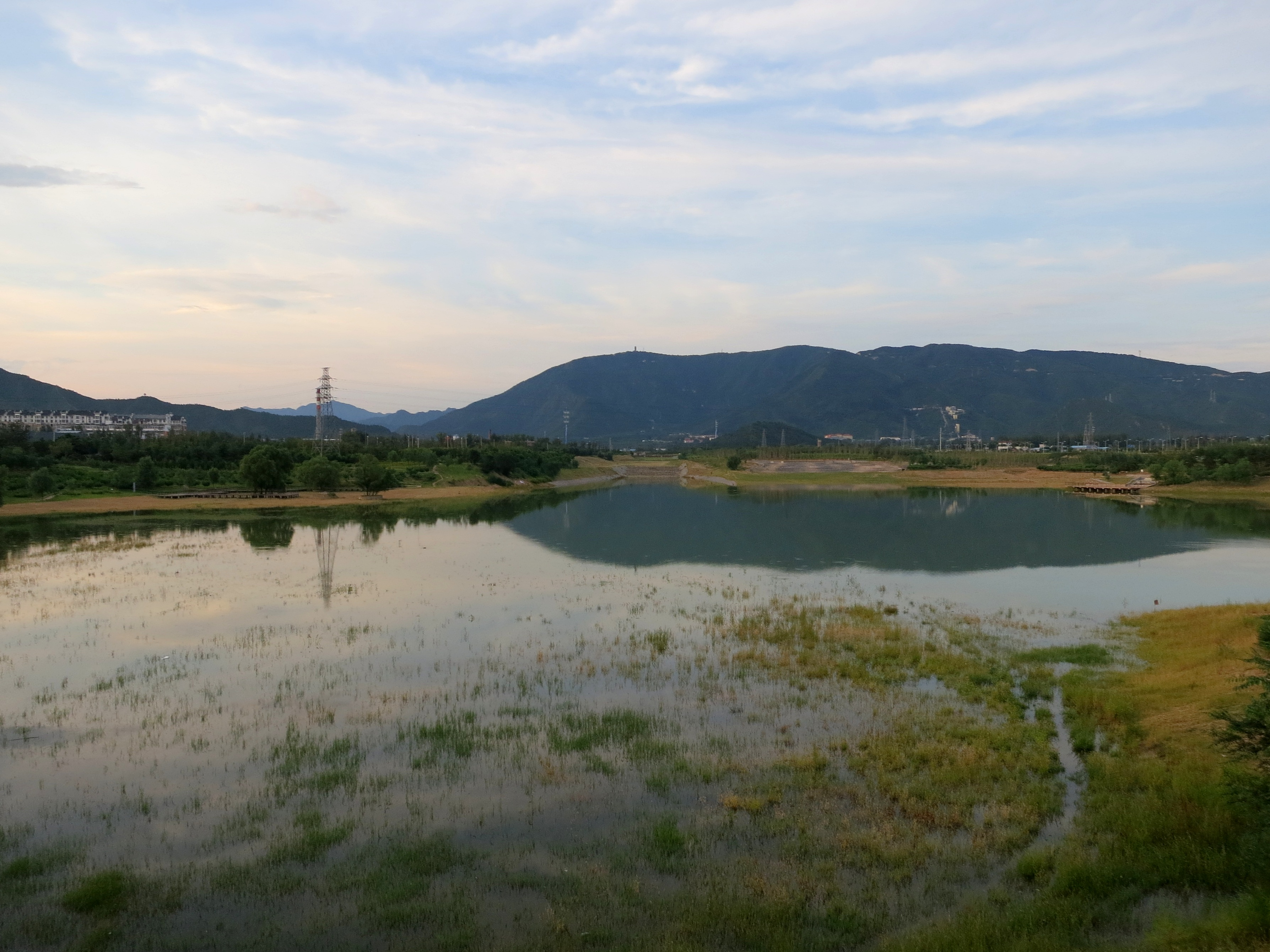
Changping New Town Riverside Forest Park, 2015

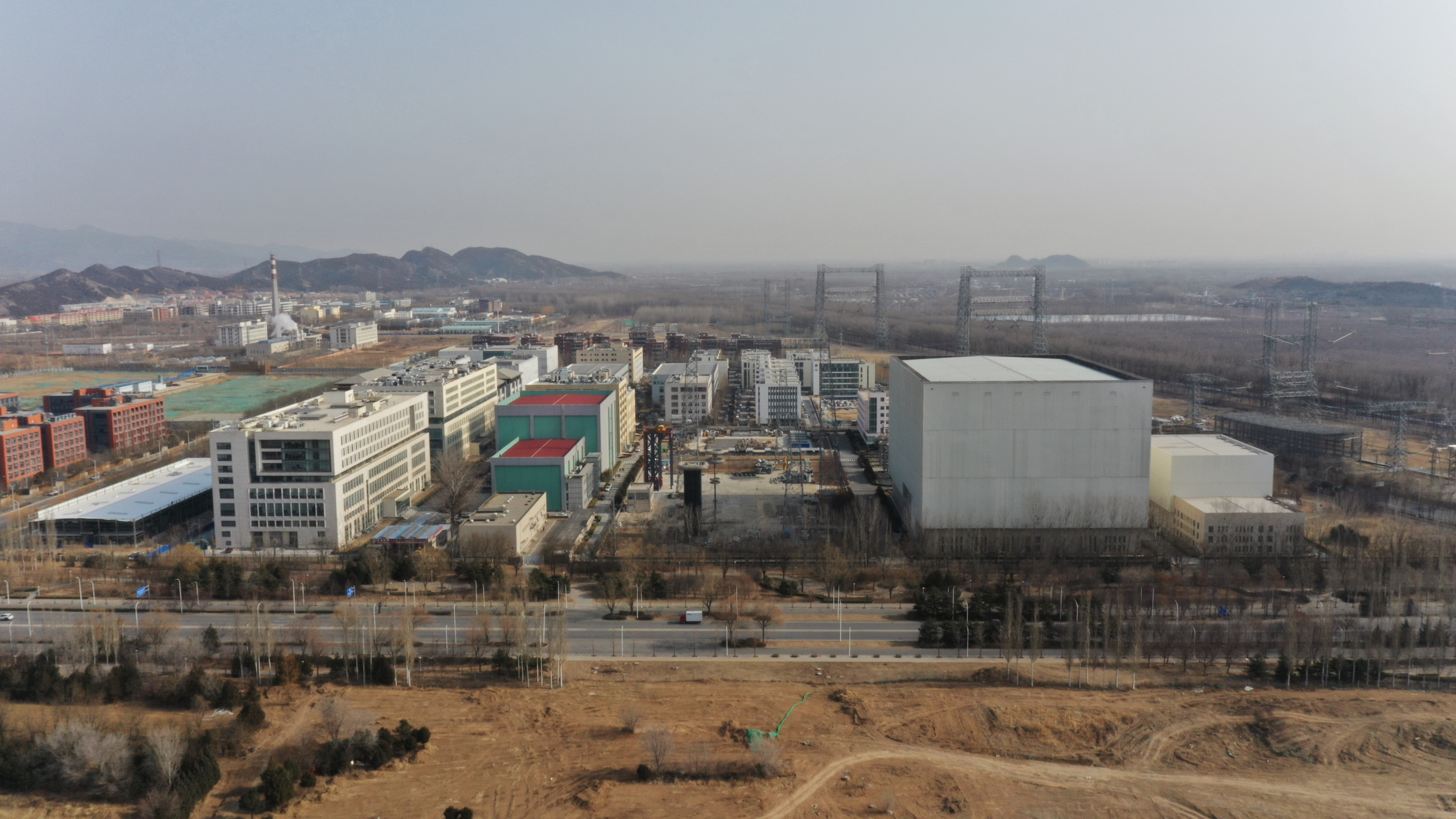
The Changping Base of China Electric Power Research Institute, 2021

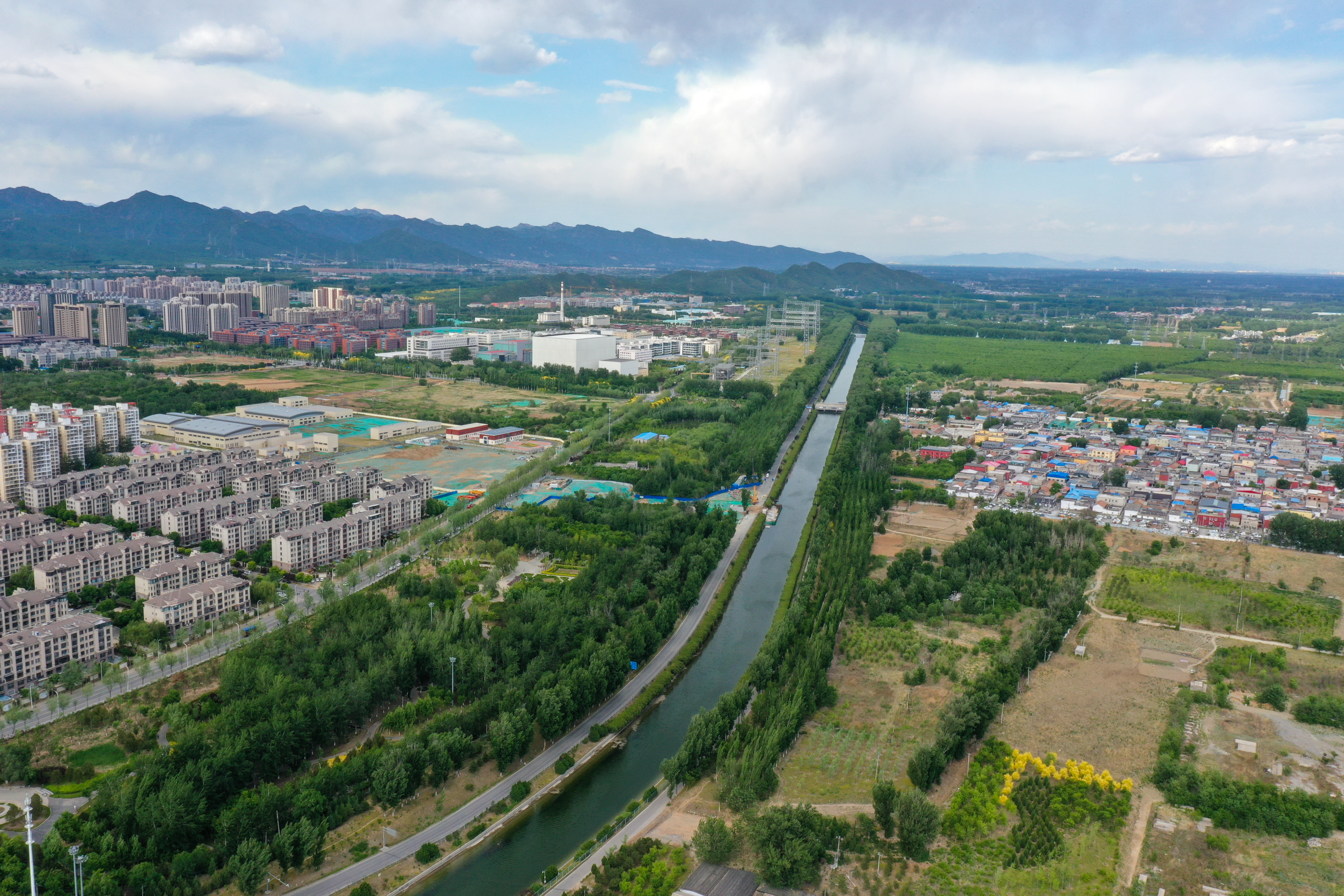
Beijing-Miyun Diversion Canal, 2022

== See also ==
- List of township-level divisions of Beijing
