= G5901 Hohhot Ring Expressway =

Expressway in Hohhot, China

Hohhot Ring Expressway
- 呼和浩特绕城高速公路

Route information
- Length: 101.7 km (63.2 mi)

Major junctions
- Orbital around Hohhot

Location
- Country: China

Highway system
- National Trunk Highway System; Primary; Auxiliary; National Highways; Transport in China
| ← G59 | → G5911 |

The Hohhot Ring Expressway (Chinese: 呼和浩特绕城高速), designated as G5901 is an expressway in Inner Mongolia, Northern China orbiting the city of Hohhot. This expressway is a branch of G6 Beijing–Lhasa Expressway.

== Detailed itinerary ==
Clockwise
Continues as G5901 Hohhot Ring Expressway
| 1 A-B | G6 Jingla Expressway; G7 Jingxin Expressway |
| 2 | G110 Road; Bayan |
| 9 | Wanbu Huayanjing Pagoda |
| | S29 Hushuo Expressway; X004 Road; Jinhe |
| 23 | S102 Road ''Jinhe |
Zhaojun Service Area
| 33 | G209 Road; Hohhot-Centre; Towards Sha'erqin-Horinger Zhaojun Tomb |
Hohhot Metropolitan Area
| 47 | S31 Hujun Expressway; S103 Road; Hohhot-Centre |
| 60 | G110 Road; Taigemu |
| 61 | G6 Jingla Expressway; G7 Jingxin Expressway |
Concurrent with G6 Jingla Expressway; Concurrent with G7 Jingxin Expressway
| (489) | G110 Road; Hohhot-West; Taigemu |
Hohhot Metropolitan Area
| (480) | S104 Road; Hohhot-Centre; Towards Wuchuan |
| | S101 Road; Towards G110 Road; Hohhot-Centre |
Concurrent with G6 Jingla Expressway; Concurrent with G7 Jingxin Expressway
| (1 A-B) | G6 Jingla Expressway; G7 Jingxin Expressway |
Continues as G5901 Hohhot Ring Expressway
Counterclockwise
