= Yangfang =

Yangfang Town 阳坊镇
- Town
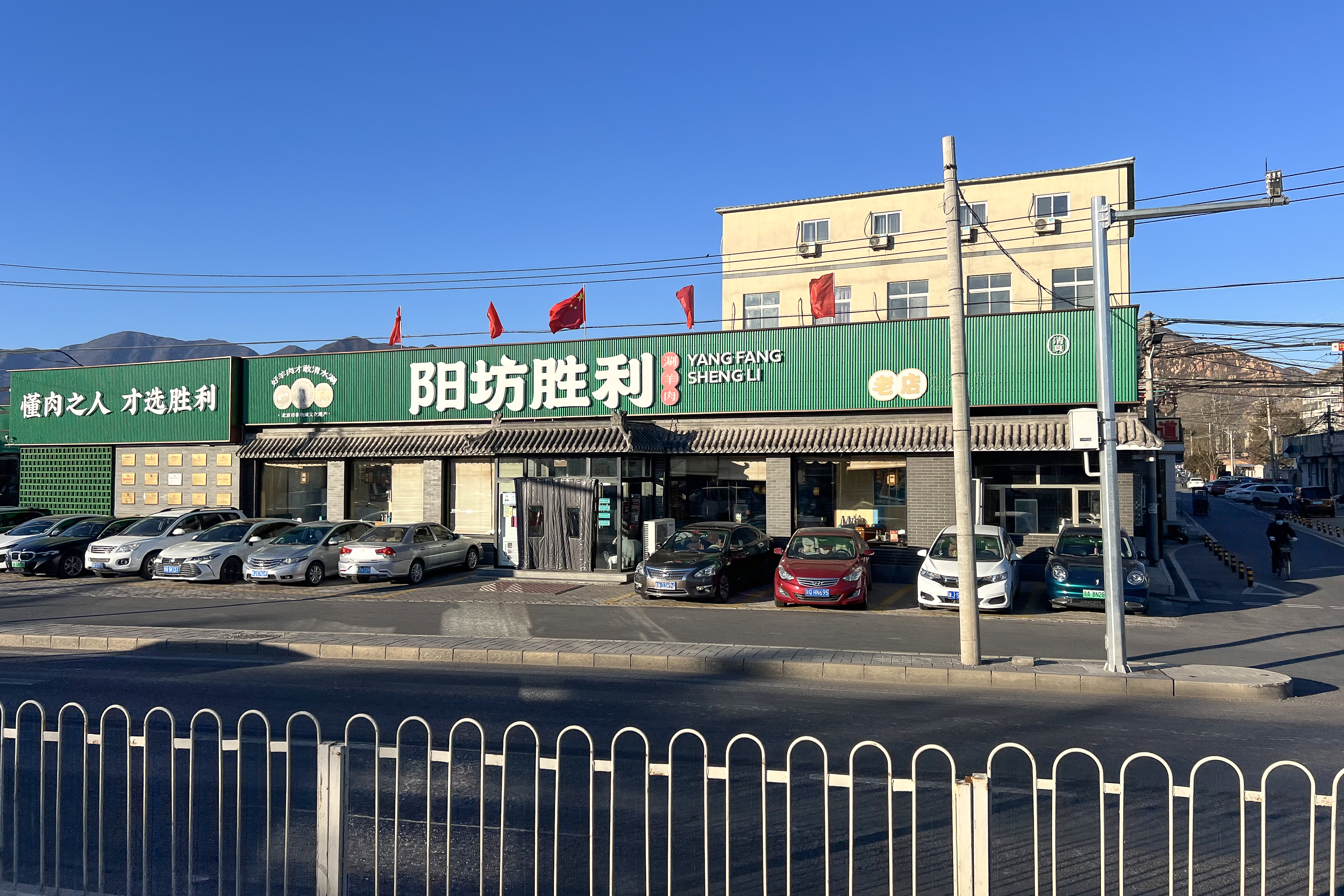
- The first Shengli Instant-boiled Mutton Restaurant in Yangfang opened in 1984, photographed in January 2025

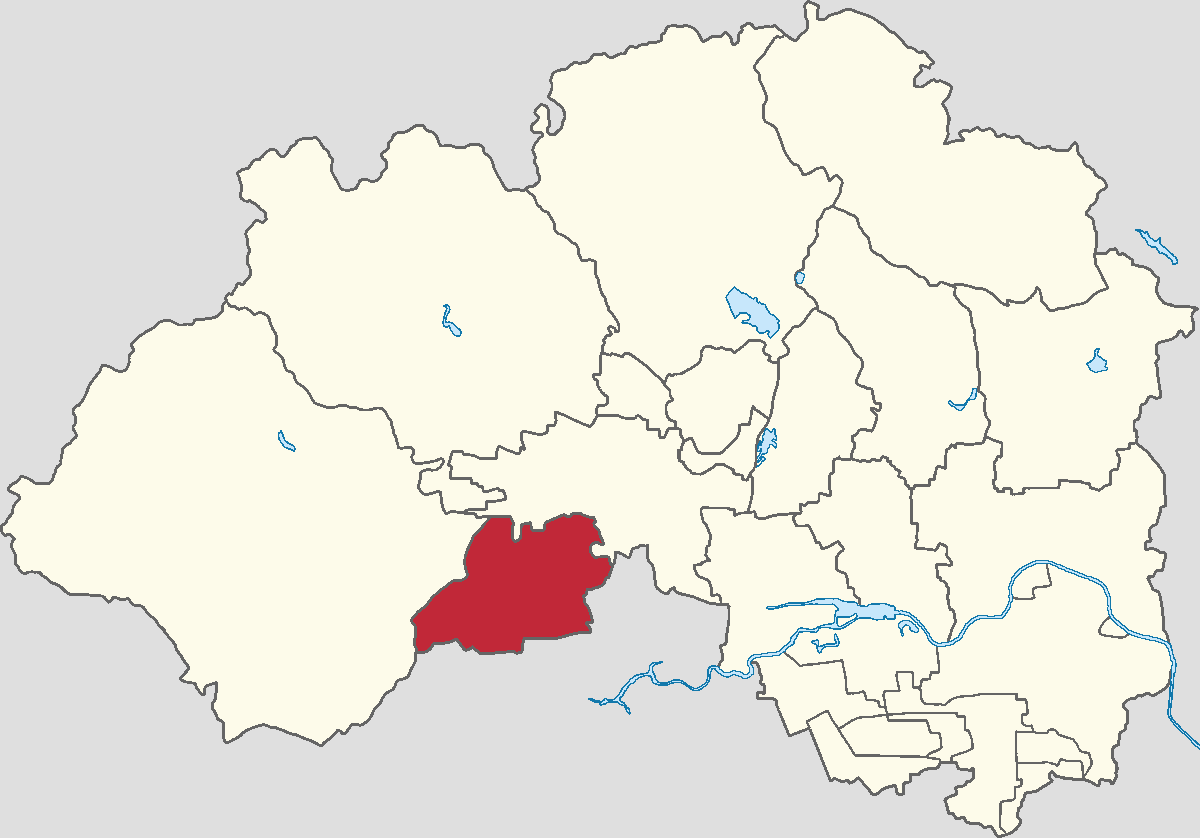
- Location in Changping District

- Location within Beijing Location within China
- Coordinates: 40°08′13″N 116°08′00″E
- Country: China
- Municipality: Beijing
- District: Changping
- Village-level Divisions: 1 community 10 villages

Area
  - Total: 40.59 km^{2} (15.67 sq mi)
- Elevation: 58 m (190 ft)

Population (2020)
  - Total: 26,470
  - Density: 652.1/km^{2} (1,689/sq mi)
- Time zone: UTC+8 (China Standard)
- Postal code: 102205
- Area code: 010

Yangfang Town (simplified Chinese: 阳坊镇; traditional Chinese: 陽坊鎮; pinyin: Yángfāng Zhèn) is a town situated on southwestern Changping District, Beijing, China. Bounded by part of Taihang Mountain Range to the west, Yangfang shares a border with Machikou Town in the north, Shangzhuang Town in the east, Sujiatuo Town in the south, and Liucun Town in the west. The population of Yangfang Town was 26,470 as of 2020.

The town originally took the name of Yangfang (Chinese: 羊坊; lit. 'Sheep Shop') for its past location as a stopping point for trading caravans and sheep herders. Later the name was corrupted to Yangfang (Chinese: 阳坊) under the Republic of China.

== History ==
Timeline of History of Yangfang
Year	Status	Under
1948–1949	12th District	Changshun County
1949–1952	7th District	Changping County
1952–1953	6th District	Changping County
1953–1956	Yangfang Town Xiguanshi Hui Autonomous Township Hou Baihujian Township Shijiaqiao Township	Changping County
1956–1958	Yangfang Township	Changping County
1958–1960	Yangfang Working Station, belonged to Nankou People's Commune	Changping County
1960–1961	Yangfang Management Area, belonged to Nankou People's Commune	Changping County
1961–1982	Yangfang people's Commune	Changping County
1982–1990	Yangfang Township	Changping County
1990–1999	Yangfang Town	Changping County
1999–present	Yangfang Town	Changping District

== Administrative divisions ==
At the time of writing, Yangfang Town consists of 11 subdivisions, with 1 community, and 10 villages:

Administrative division code	Subdivision names	Name transliteration	Type
110114104001	阳坊社区	Yangfangsheqv	Community
110114104201	阳坊村	Yangfangcun	Village
110114104202	前白虎涧村	Qianbaihujiancun	Village
110114104203	后白虎涧村	Houbaihujiancun	Village
110114104204	东贯市村	Dongguanshicun	Village
110114104205	西贯市村	Xiguanshicun	Village
110114104206	八口村	Bakoucun	Village
110114104207	辛庄村	Xinzhuangcun	Village
110114104208	史家桥村	Shijiaqiaocun	Village
110114104209	西马坊村	Ximafangcun	Village
110114104210	四家庄村	Sijiazhuangcun	Village

== See also ==
- List of township-level divisions of Beijing
