= Nankou, Beijing =

Town in Beijing, China

Nankou Town 南口镇
- Town
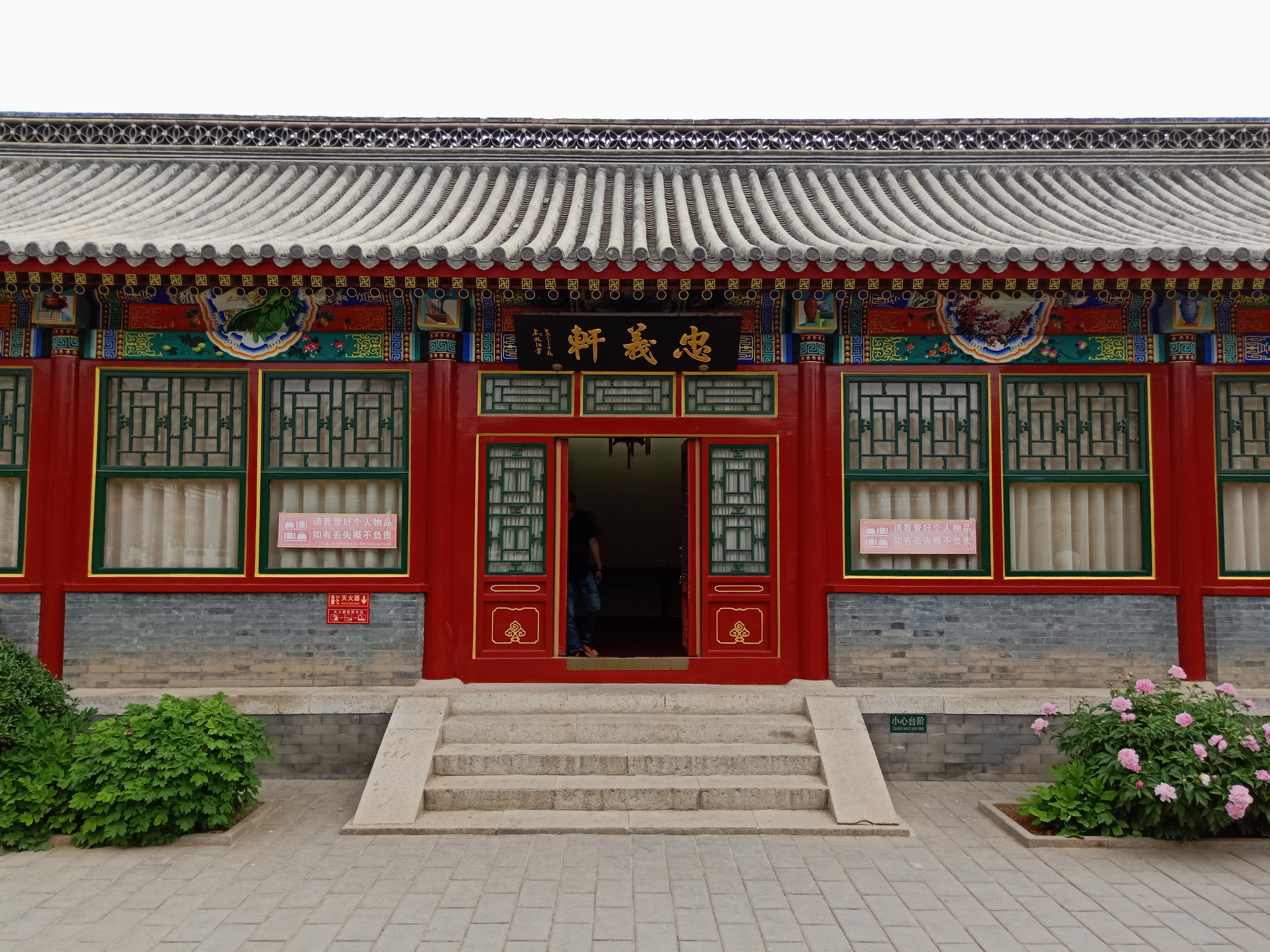
- Yilu Garden Scenic Area in Longhutai Village, Nankou

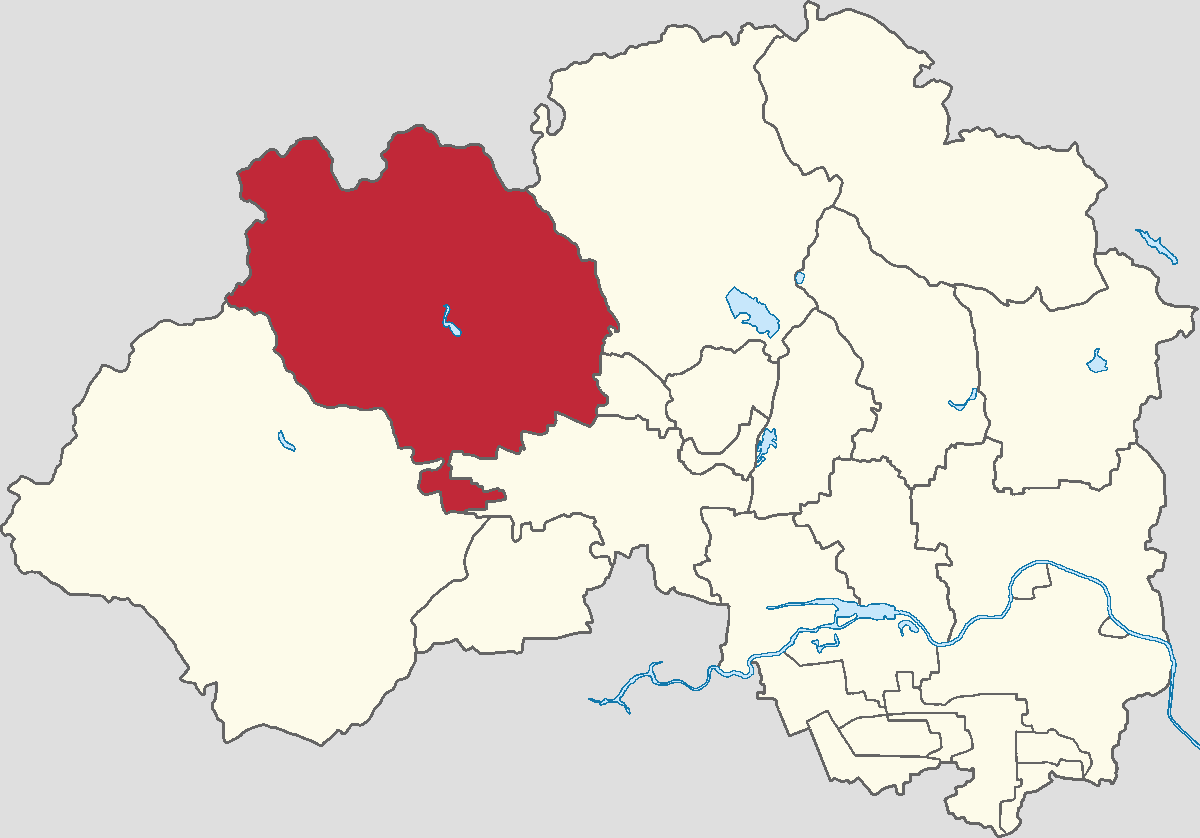
- Location of Nankou Town within Changping District

- Location within Beijing Location within China
- Coordinates: 40°14′43″N 116°07′43″E
- Country: China
- Municipality: Beijing
- District: Changping
- Village-level Divisions: 11 communities 28 villages

Area
  - Total: 197.6 km^{2} (76.3 sq mi)
- Elevation: 86 m (282 ft)

Population (2020)
  - Total: 82,146
  - Density: 415.7/km^{2} (1,077/sq mi)
- Time zone: UTC+8 (China Standard)
- Postal code: 102208
- Area code: 010

Nankou Town (Chinese: 南口镇; pinyin: Nánkǒu Zhèn) is a town situated on the northwestern corner of Changping District, Beijing, China. Bounded by part of Taihang Mountain Range in its north and west, Nankou borders Badaling and Jingzhuang Towns in its north, Chengnan Subdistrict and Shisanling Town in its east, Machikou and Liucun Towns in its south, and Ruiyunguan Township in its west. In 2020, it had 82,146 people under its administration.

The area got its name Nankou (Chinese: 南口; lit. 'Southern Gate'), from a fortified pass south of Juyong Pass.

== History ==
Timetable of Nankou Town
Time	Status	Belonged to
Ming and Qing dynasties	Nankou Village	Yanqing County
1912–1949	Nankou Town	Co-administered by Yanqing and Changping Counties
1949–1950	Nankou Town	Changping County
1950–1953	3rd District	Changping County
1953–1958	Nankou Town	Changping County
1958–1979	Nankou Commune	Changping County
1979–1983	Nankouzhen Commune	Changping County
1983–1987	Nankou Township	Changping County
1987–1990	Nankou Town	Changping County
1990–1997	Nankou Town Daonan Town	Changping County
1997–1999	Nankou Town (Integrated Taowa Township in 1997)	Changping County
1999–present	Nankou Area (Nankou Town) (Integrated Nankou Farm and part of Tulou Township in 1999)	Changping District

== Administrative divisions ==
As of 2021, Nankou Town had 39 subdivisions within its borders, composed of 11 communities, and 28 villages:

Administrative division code	Subdivision names	Name transliteration	Type
110114002001	十一条社区	Shiyitiaosheqv	Community
110114002004	兴隆街社区	Xinglongjiesheqv	Community
110114002006	隆盛街社区	Longshengjiesheqv	Community
110114002008	水厂路社区	Shuichanglusheqv	Community
110114002012	南口村社区	Nankoucunsheqv	Community
110114002013	新兴路社区	Xinxinglusheqv	Community
110114002014	玻璃公司社区	Boligongsisheqv	Community
110114002015	南厂东社区	Nanchangdongsheqv	Community
110114002016	南厂西社区	Nanchangxisjeqv	Community
110114002017	保温瓶公司社区	Baowenpinggongsisheqv	Community
110114002018	南农社区	Nannongsheqv	Community
110114002201	太平庄村	Taipingzhuangcun	Village
110114002202	虎峪村	Huyucun	Village
110114002203	陈庄村	Chenzhuangcun	Village
110114002204	红泥沟村	Hongnigoucun	Village
110114002205	雪山村	Xueshancun	Village
110114002206	龙虎台村	Longhutaicun	Village
110114002207	燕磨峪村	Yanmoyucun	Village
110114002208	七间房村	Qijianfangcun	Village
110114002209	辛力庄村	Xinlizhuangcun	Village
110114002210	南口村	Nankoucun	Village
110114002211	龙潭村	Longtancun	Village
110114002212	居庸关村	Juyuguancun	Village
110114002213	羊台子村	Yangtaizicun	Village
110114002214	马庄村	Mazhuangcun	Village
110114002215	南口镇村	Nankouzhencun	Village
110114002216	马坊村	Mafangcun	Village
110114002217	后桃洼村	Houtaowacun	Village
110114002218	前桃洼村	Qiantaowacun	Village
110114002219	长水峪村	Changshuiyucun	Village
110114002220	檀峪村	Tanyucun	Village
110114002221	王庄村	Wangzhuangcun	Village
110114002222	曹庄村	Caozhuangcun	Village
110114002223	花塔村	Huatacun	Village
110114002224	兴隆口村	Xinglongkoucun	Village
110114002225	新元村	Xinyuancun	Village
110114002226	东李庄村	Donglizhuangcun	Village
110114002227	西李庄村	Xilizhuangcun	Village
110114002228	响潭村	Xiangtancun	Village

== Gallery ==
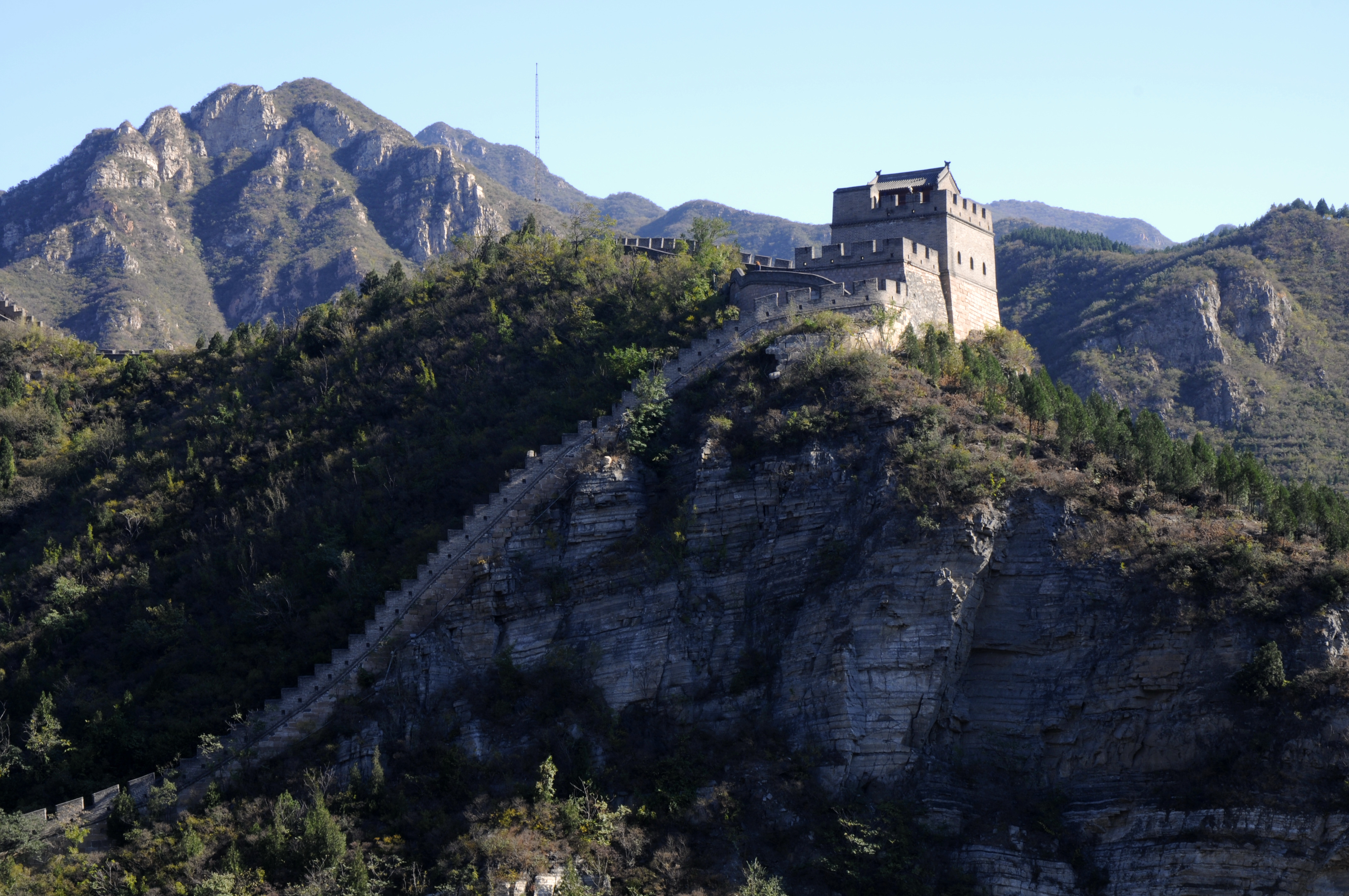
Juyong Pass and surrounding section of the Great Wall, 2012

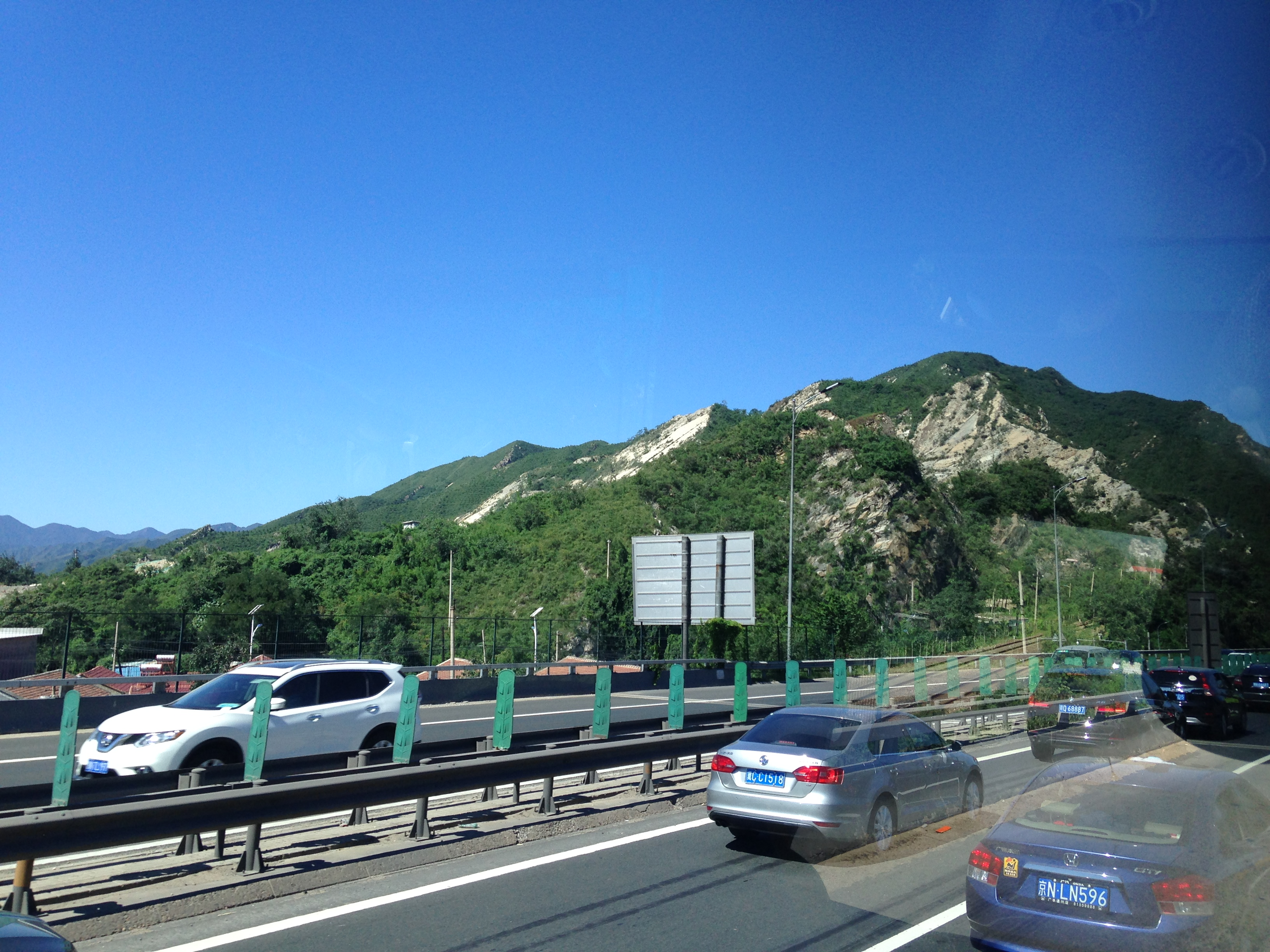
Part of Beijing-Lhasa Expressway near Nankou, 2016

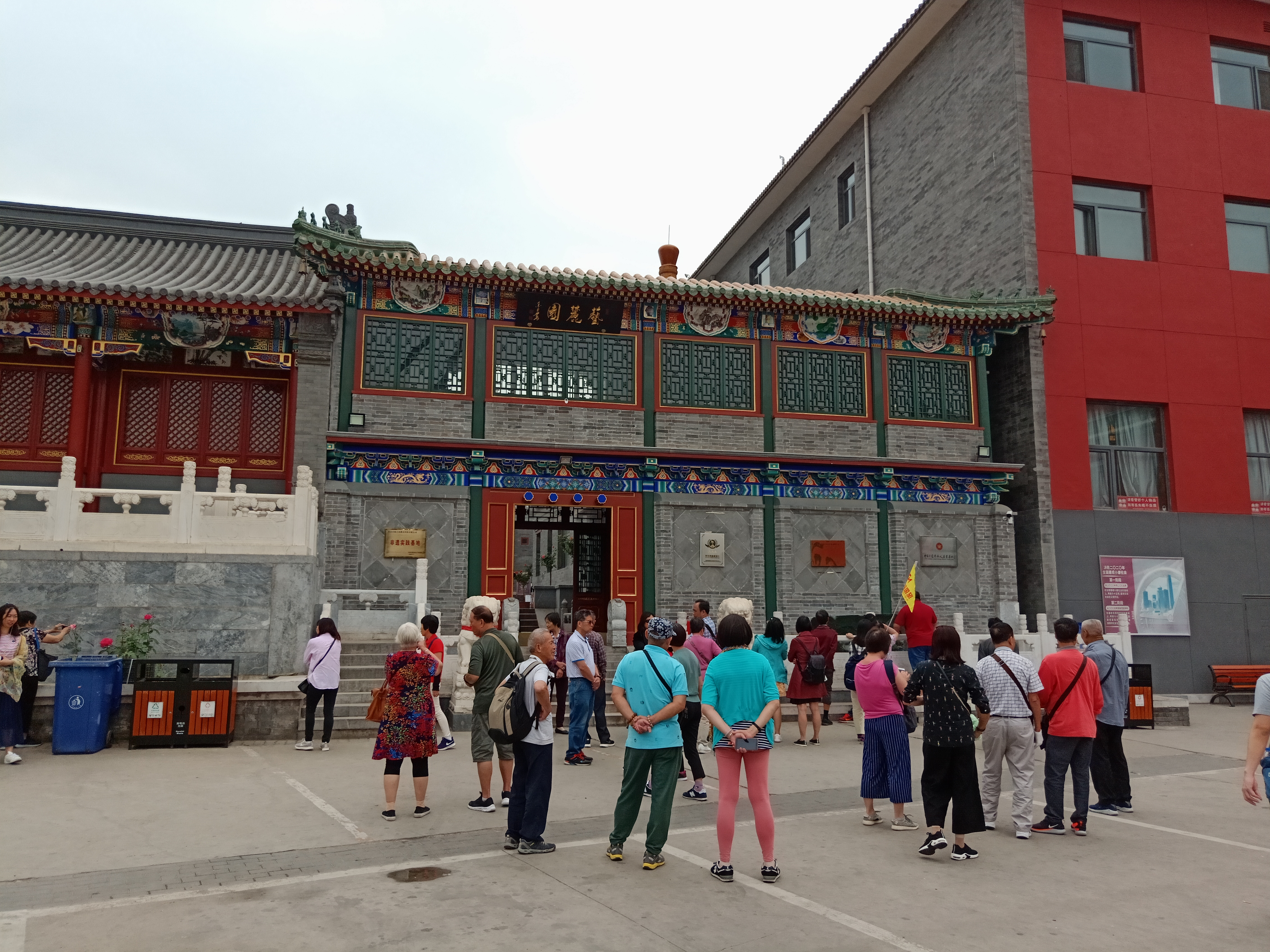
Entrance of Yilu Garden, 2018

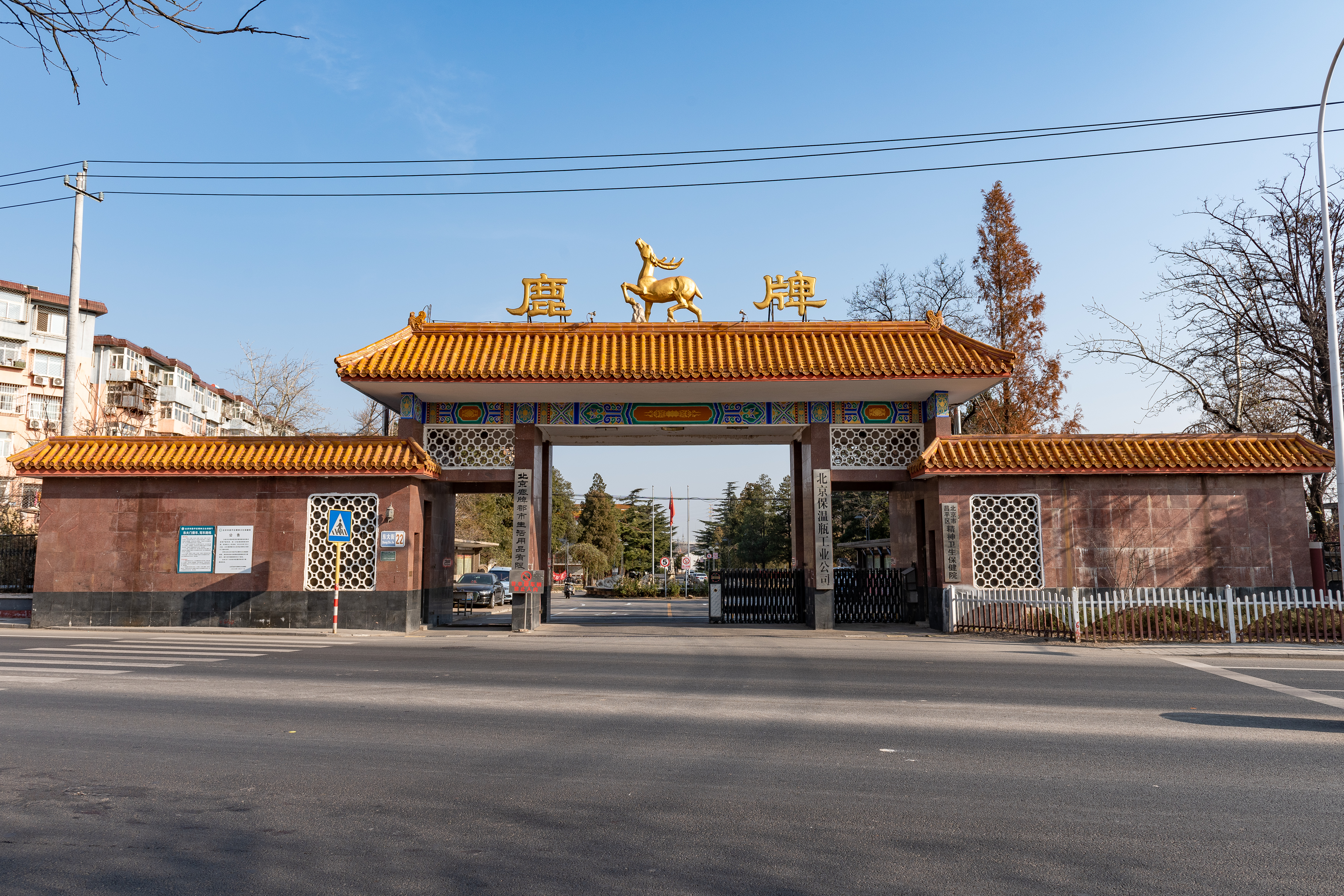
Beijing Vacuum Flask Industrial Company, 2020

== Transport ==
- Nankou railway station

== See also ==
- List of township-level divisions of Beijing
