= Beixinbao =

Beixinbao 北辛堡镇
- Town
- Bĕixīnbăo Zhèn
- Location in Hebei Location in China
- Coordinates: 40°24′42″N 115°44′43″E
- Country: People's Republic of China
- Province: Hebei
- Prefecture-level city: Zhangjiakou
- County: Huailai

Area
  - Total: 83.42 km^{2} (32.21 sq mi)

Population (2010)
  - Total: 17,347
  - Density: 207.9/km^{2} (538/sq mi)
- Time zone: UTC+8 (China Standard)

Beixinbao (Chinese: 北辛堡镇; pinyin: Bĕixīnbăo Zhèn) is a town located in Huailai County, Zhangjiakou, Hebei, China. According to the 2010 census, Beixinbao had a population of 17,347, including 8,874 males and 8,473 females. The population was distributed as follows: 2,539 people aged under 14, 13,146 people aged between 15 and 64, and 1,662 people aged over 65.

== See also ==
- List of township-level divisions of Hebei
