= Shahe, Beijing =

Shahe Town 沙河镇
- Town
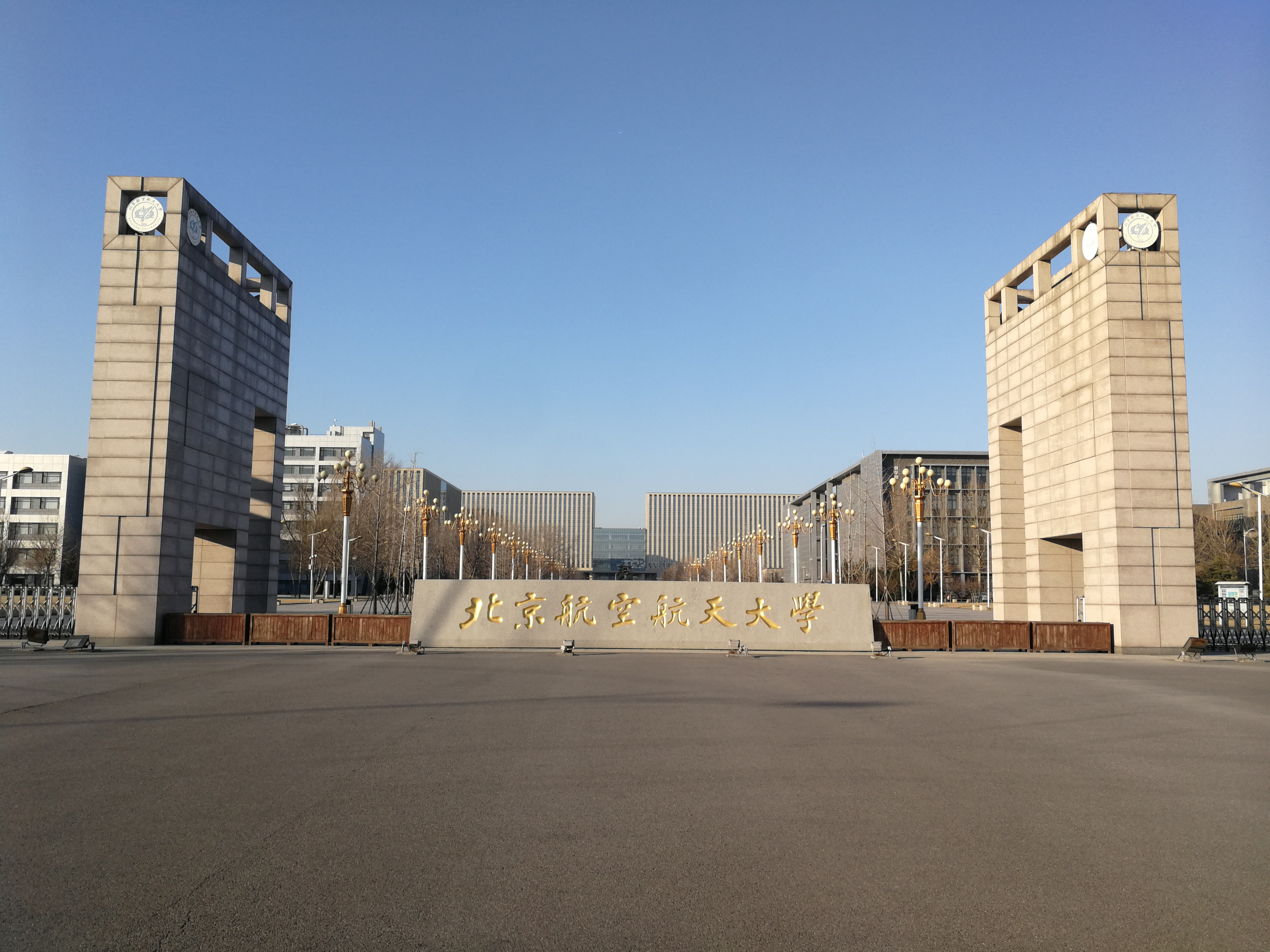
- Beijing University of Aeronautics and Astronautics Shahe Campus, 2018

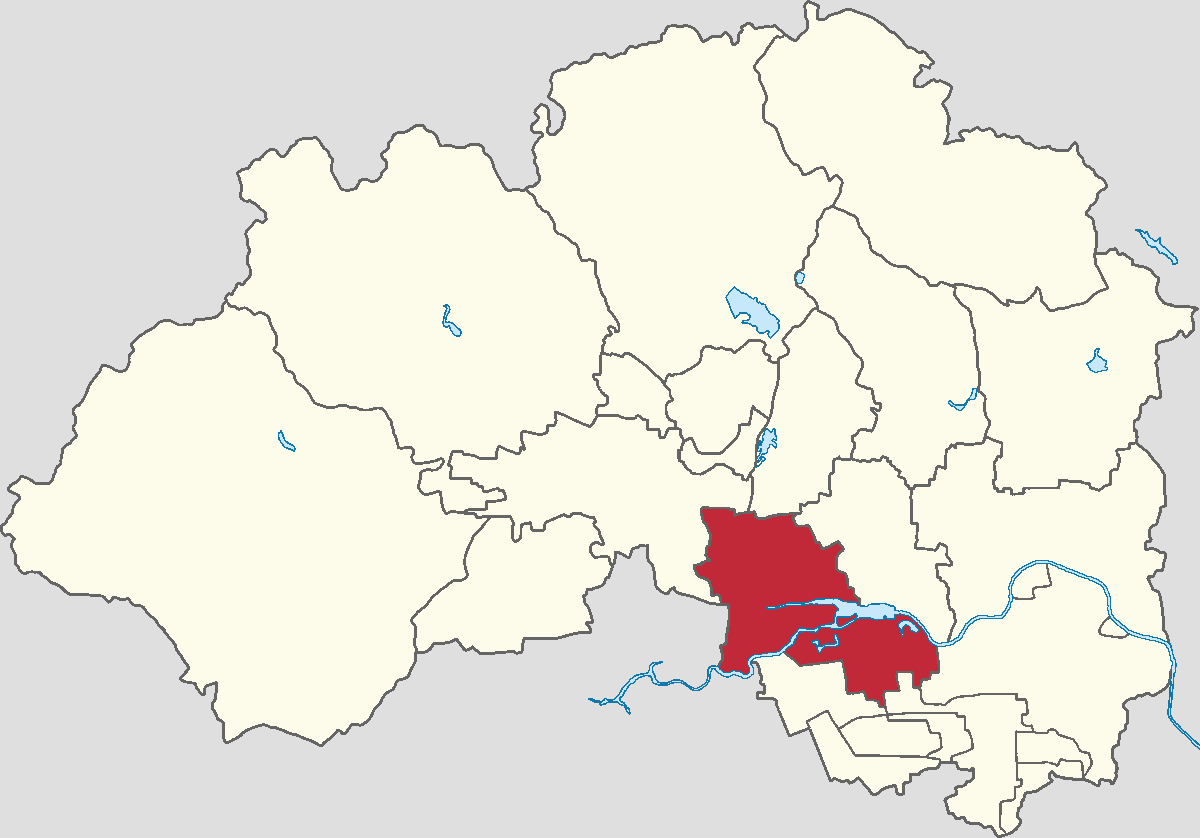
- Location of Shahe Town within Changping District

- Location within Beijing Location within China
- Coordinates: 40°09′27″N 116°14′48″E
- Country: China
- Municipality: Beijing
- District: Changping
- Village-level Divisions: 24 communities 22 villages

Area
  - Total: 53.28 km^{2} (20.57 sq mi)
- Elevation: 43 m (141 ft)

Population (2020)
  - Total: 294,408
  - Density: 5,526/km^{2} (14,310/sq mi)
- Time zone: UTC+8 (China Standard)
- Postal code: 102206
- Area code: 010

Shahe Town (Chinese: 沙河镇; pinyin: Shāhé Zhèn) is a Town in Changping District, Beijing, China. It shares border with Nanshao Town to the north, Baishan and Beiqijia Towns to the east, Shigezhuang Subdistrict and Dongxiaokou Town to the south, Xibeiwang and Shangzhuang Towns to the southwest, and Machikou Town to the west. In the year 2020, its population was 294,408.

The area was named after three rivers: Nansha, Beisha, and Dongsha. They flow together to form Wenyu River in the east of the area.

== History ==
Timeline of Shahe Town
Year	Status	Part of
1949–1953	2nd District	Changping County
1953–1956	Shahe Town	Changping County
1956–1958	Shahe Township	Changping County
1958–1959	Shahe Working Station, under Xiaotangshan People's Commune	Changping County
1959–1961	Shahezhen Management Area, under Shahe Sino-Vietnamese Friendship People's Commune	Changping County
1961–1981	Shahe People's Commune	Changping County
1981–1987	Shahe Township	Changping County
1987–1990	Shahe Town	Changping County
1990–1997	Shahe Town Gonghua Town	Changping County
1997–1999	Shahe Town (Incorporated Qiliqu Township in 1999)	Changping County
1999–2007	Shahe Town (Incorporated Qiliqu Township in 1999)	Changping District
2007–present	Shahe Area (Shahe Town)	Changping District

== Administrative divisions ==
In 2021, Shahe Town was formed by 46 subdivisions, with 24 communities and 22 villages:

Administrative division code	Subdivision names	Name transliteration	Type
110114004001	南一社区	Nanyisheqv	Community
110114004003	东一社区	Dongyisheqv	Community
110114004004	西二社区	Xiyisheqv	Community
110114004005	北二社区	Bei'ersheqv	Community
110114004006	站前路社区	Zhanqianlusheqv	Community
110114004007	沙阳路社区	Shayanglusheqv	Community
110114004008	保利罗兰香谷社区	Baoliluolanxianggusheqv	Community
110114004009	兆丰家园社区	Zhaofengjiayuansheqv	Community
110114004010	北街家园第一社区	Beijiejiayuandiyisheqv	Community
110114004011	北街家园第二社区	Beijiejiayuandi'ersheqv	Community
110114004012	北街家园第三社区	Beijiejiayuandisansheqv	Community
110114004013	碧水庄园社区	Bishuizhuangyuansheqv	Community
110114004014	于善街南社区	Yushanjienansheqv	Community
110114004015	冠芳园社区	Guanfangyuansheqv	Community
110114004016	五福家园社区	Wufujiayuansheqv	Community
110114004017	巩华新村社区	Gonghuaxincunsheqv	Community
110114004018	滟澜新宸社区	Yanlanxinchensheqv	Community
110114004019	恒大幸福家园第一社区	Hengdaxingfujiayuandiyisheqv	Community
110114004020	恒大幸福家园第二社区	Hengdaxingfujiayuandi'ersheqv	Community
110114004021	路松街社区	Lusongjiesheqv	Community
110114004022	紫荆香谷社区	Zijingxianggusheqv	Community
110114004023	祥业家园社区	Xiangyejiayuansheqv	Community
110114004024	北街家园第四社区	Beijiejiayuandisisheqv	Community
110114004025	北街家园第五社区	Beijiejiayuandiwusheqv	Community
110114004201	西沙屯村	Xishatuncun	Village
110114004202	老牛湾村	Laoniuwancun	Village
110114004203	南一村	Nanyicun	Village
110114004204	东一村	Dongyicun	Village
110114004205	西二村	Xi'ercun	Village
110114004206	北二村	Bei'ercun	Village
110114004207	辛力屯村	Xinlituncun	Village
110114004208	路庄村	Luzhuangcun	Village
110114004209	踩河村	Caihecun	Village
110114004210	丰善村	Fengshancun	Village
110114004211	于辛庄村	Yuxinzhuangcun	Village
110114004212	满井东队村	Manjingdongduicun	Village
110114004213	满井西队村	Manjingxiduicun	Village
110114004214	松兰堡村	Songlanbaocun	Village
110114004215	王庄村	Wangzhuangcun	Village
110114004216	小寨村	Xiaozhaicun	Village
110114004217	大洼村	Dawacun	Village
110114004218	七里渠南村	Qiliqunancun	Village
110114004219	七里渠北村	Qiliqubeicun	Village
110114004220	白各庄村	Baigezhuangcun	Village
110114004221	豆各庄村	Dougezhuangcun	Village
110114004222	小沙河村	Xiaoshahecun	Village

== Gallery ==
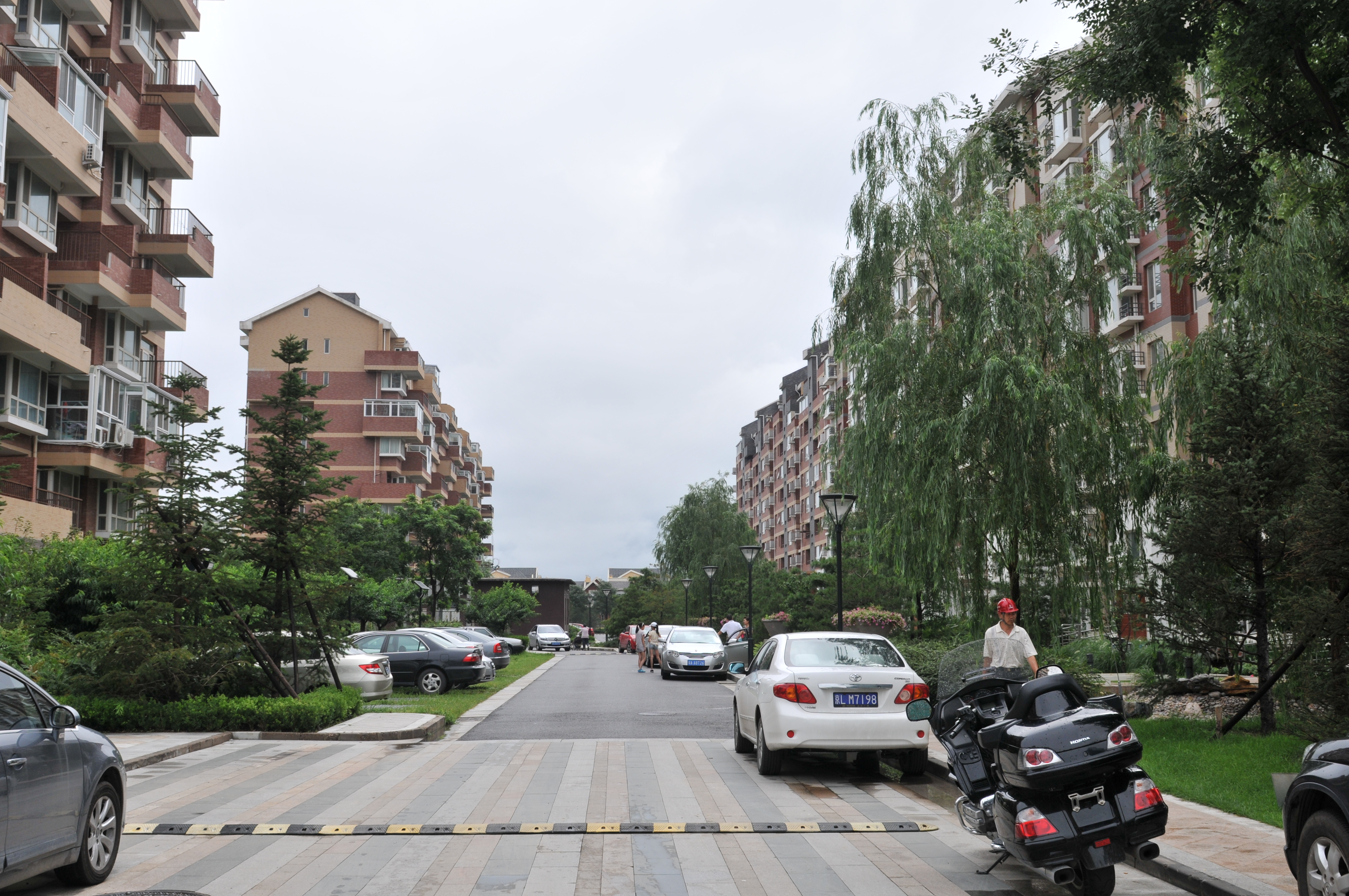
Residential neighborhood on the northwest of the area, 2011

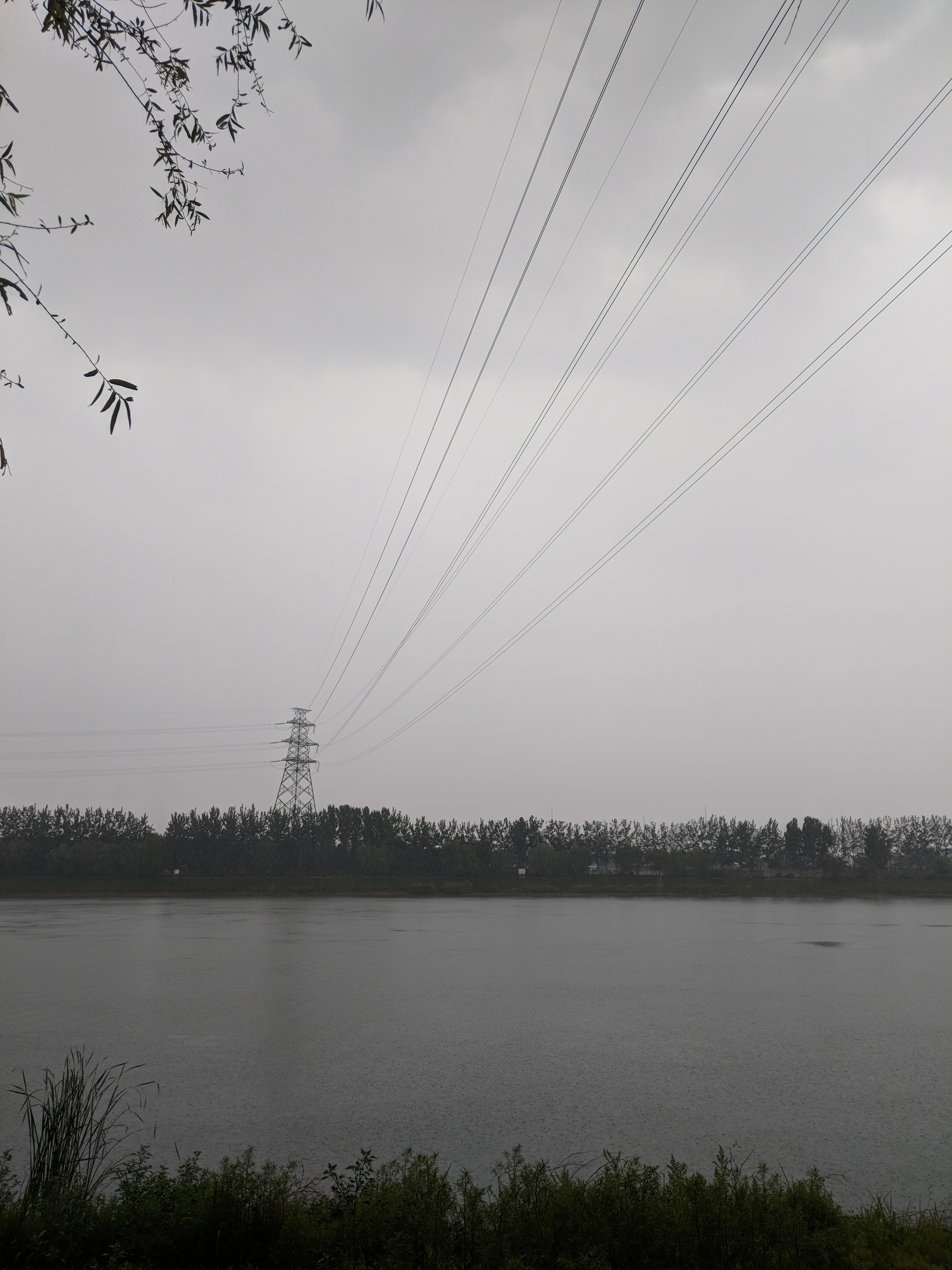
Shahe Reservoir, 2018

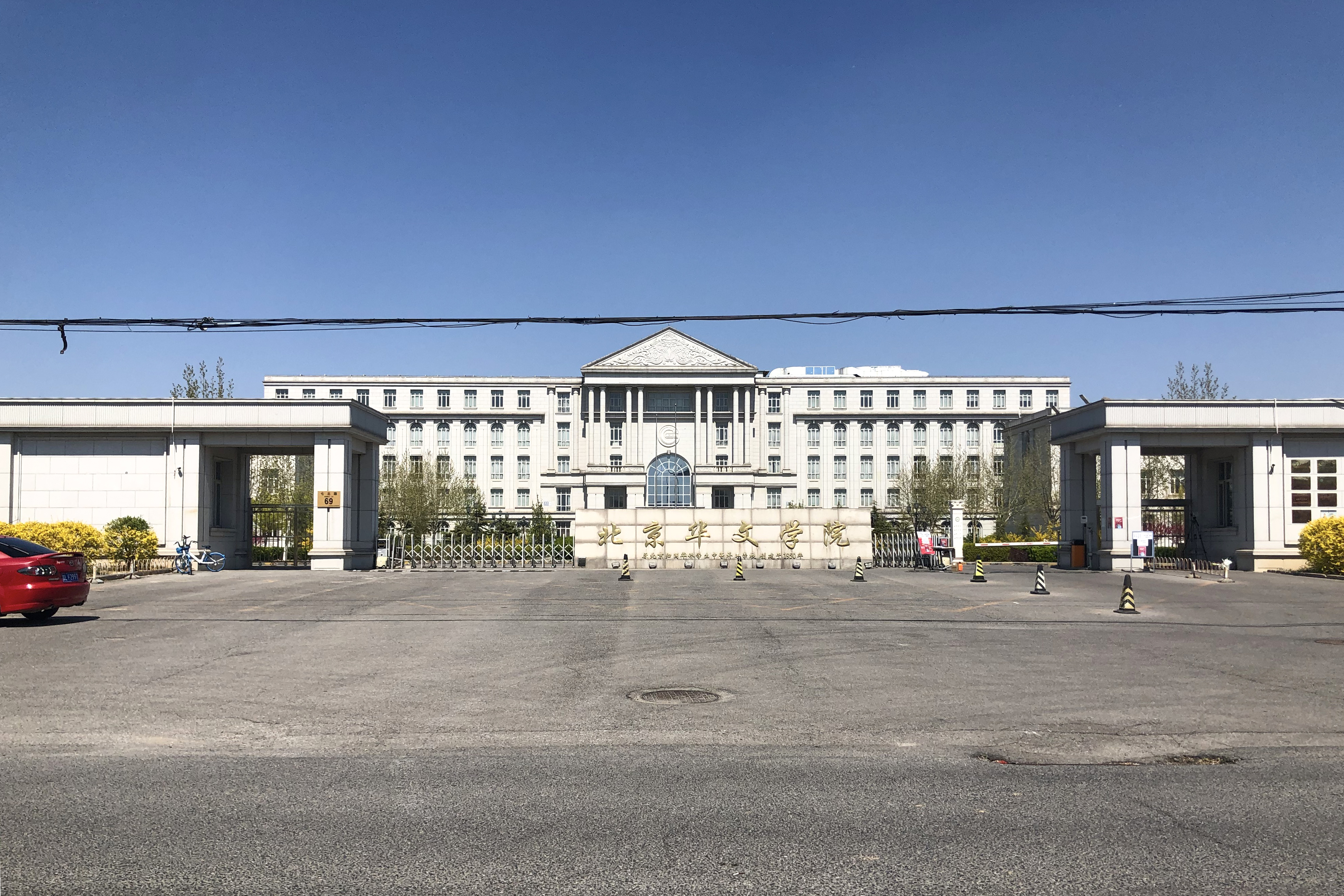
Beijing Chinese Language and Culture College, 2020

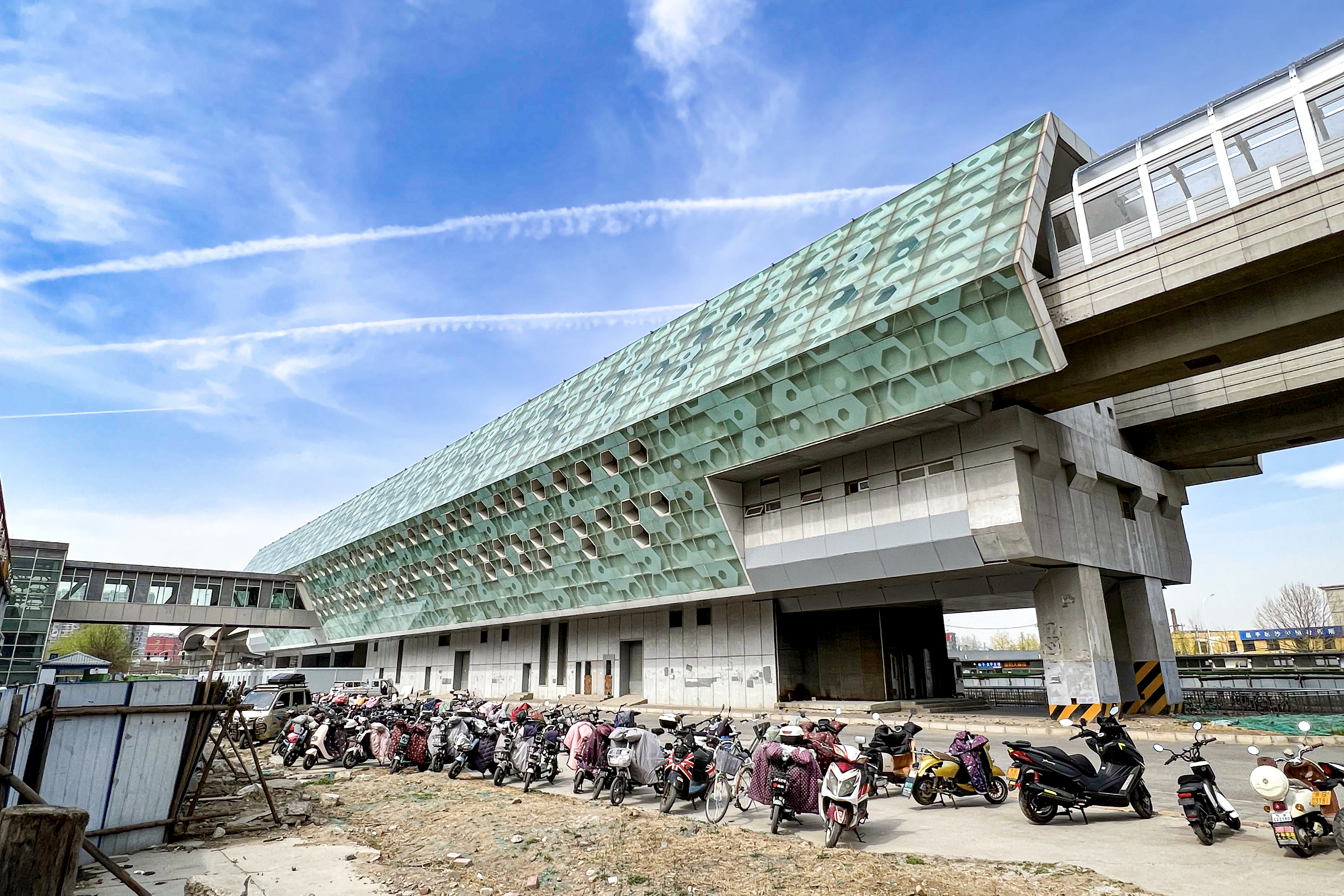
Shahe Station of Beijing Subway, 2022

== See also ==
- List of township-level divisions of Beijing
