= Shangzhuang, Beijing =

Shangzhuang Town 上庄镇
- Town
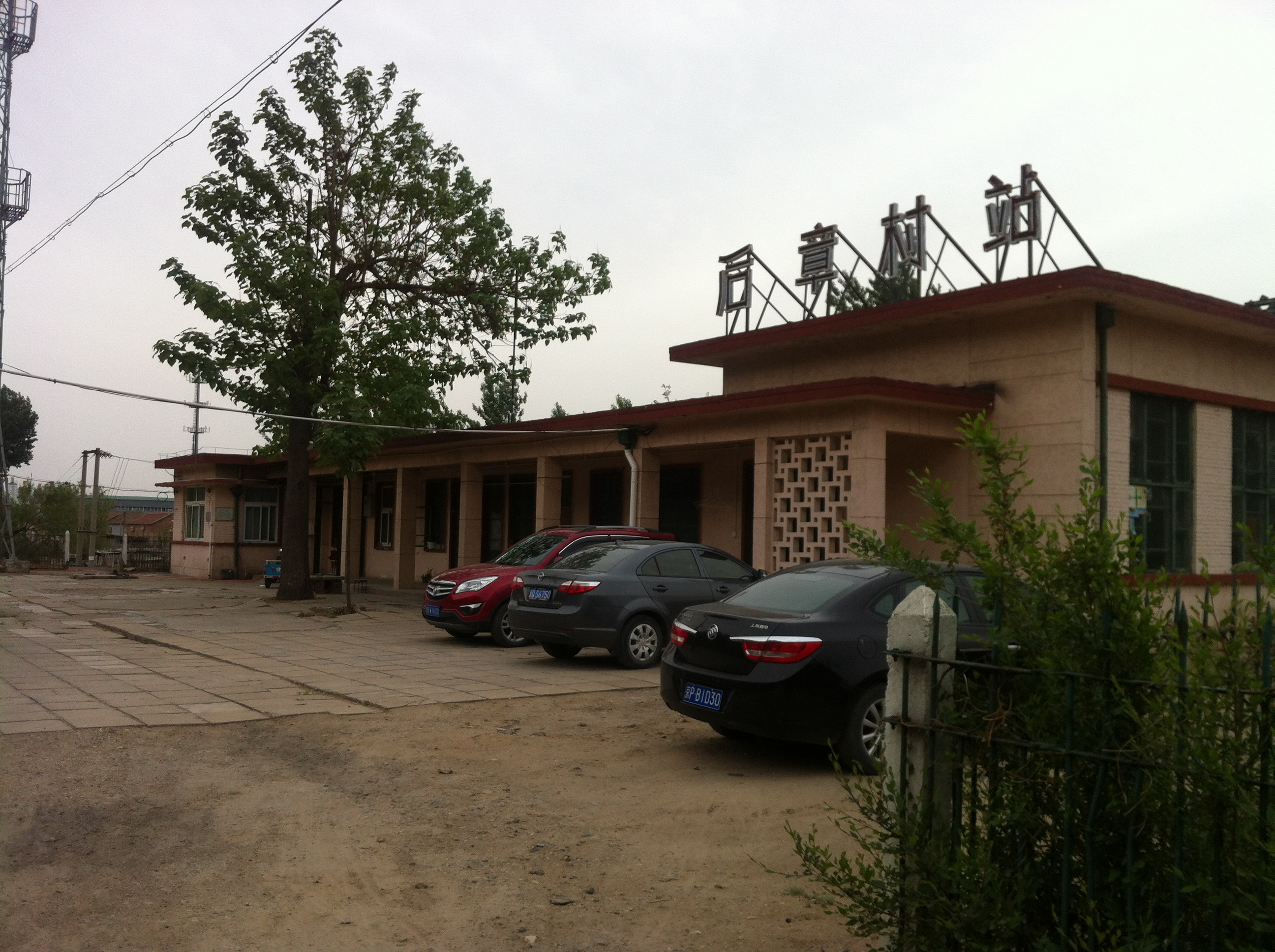
- Houzhangcun Station within the town, 2015

- Location within Beijing Location within China
- Coordinates: 40°05′40″N 116°12′32″E
- Country: China
- Municipality: Beijing
- District: Haidian
- Village-level Divisions: 6 communities 20 villages

Area
  - Total: 38.46 km^{2} (14.85 sq mi)

Population (2020)
  - Total: 71,554
  - Density: 1,860/km^{2} (4,819/sq mi)
- Time zone: UTC+8 (China Standard)
- Postal code: 100094
- Area code: 010

Shangzhuang Town (Chinese: 上庄镇; pinyin: Shàngzhuāng Zhèn) is a town on the northern end of Haidian District, Beijing, China. It borders Machikou Town in the north, Shahe Town in the east, Xibeiwang Town in the southeast, Sujiatuo and Yangfang Town in the west. The 2020 census determined this area's population to be 71,554.

The name Shangzhuang (Chinese: 上庄; lit. 'Upper Villa') came from a village where the government of the town is located in.

== History ==
Timeline of Shangzhuang Area
Year	Status
1956	Established as Baishuiwa Township
1958	Part of Changping District Pioneer People's Commune
1961	Formed its own commune
1984	Changed into a township
1998	Xijiao Farm and the township was separated
2003	Changed into a town
2011	Became an area while retaining the status of town

== Administrative Divisions ==
In 2021, Shangzhuang Area covered 32 subdivisions, including 6 communities and 26 villages:

Administrative division code	Subdivision names	Name transliteration	Type
110108030001	上庄家园	Shangzhuang Jiayuan	Community
110108030002	馨瑞家园	Xinrui Jiayuan	Community
110108030003	三嘉信苑	Sanjia Xinyuan	Community
110108030004	翠北嘉园	Cuibei Jiayuan	Community
110108030005	馨悦家园	Xinyue Jiayuan	Community
110108030006	馨怡嘉园	Xinyi Jiayuan	Community
110108030201	东马坊	Dongmafang	Village
110108030202	上庄	Shangzhuang	Village
110108030203	前章村	Qianzhangcun	Village
110108030204	白水洼	Baishuiwa	Village
110108030205	西马坊	Ximafang	Village
110108030206	常乐	Changle	Village
110108030207	东小营	Dongxiaoying	Village
110108030208	罗家坟	Luojiafen	Village
110108030209	皂甲屯	Zhaojiatun	Village
110108030210	李家坟	Lijiafen	Village
110108030211	南玉河	Nanyuhe	Village
110108030212	北玉河	Beiyuhe	Village
110108030213	永泰庄	Yongtaizhuang	Village
110108030214	梅所屯	Meisuotun	Village
110108030215	双塔	Shuangta	Village
110108030216	西闸	Xizha	Village
110108030217	河北村	Hebeicun	Village
110108030218	八家	Bajia	Village
110108030219	后章村	Houzhangcun	Village
110108030220	西辛力屯	Xixinlitun	Village

== See also ==
- List of township-level divisions of Beijing
