= Xiangying =

Xiangying Township 香营乡
- Township
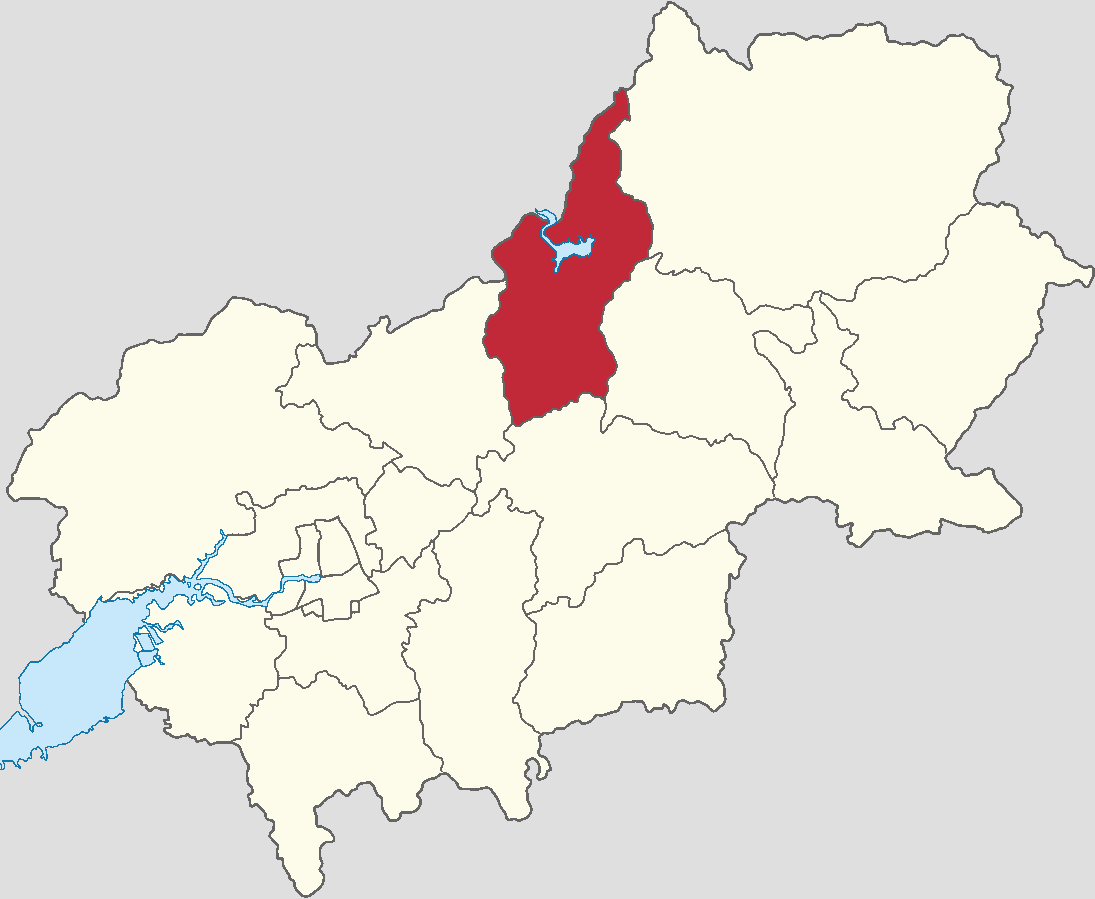
- Location in Yanqing District

- Location within Beijing Location within China
- Coordinates: 40°34′12″N 116°08′29″E
- Country: China
- Municipality: Beijing
- District: Yanqing
- Village-level Divisions: 1 community 20 villages

Area
  - Total: 120.2 km^{2} (46.4 sq mi)
- Elevation: 533 m (1,749 ft)

Population (2020)
  - Total: 6,019
  - Density: 50.07/km^{2} (129.7/sq mi)
- Time zone: UTC+8 (China Standard)
- Postal code: 102104
- Area code: 010

Xiangying Township (simplified Chinese: 香营乡; traditional Chinese: 香營鄉; pinyin: Xiāngyíng Xiāng) is a township on the north of Yanqing District, Beijing, China. It borders Houcheng Town to its north, Qianjiadian Town and Liubinbu Township to its east, Yongning and Shenjiaying Towns to its south, and Zhangshanying Town to its west. In 2020, its population was 6.019.

The township was named Xiangying (Chinese: 香营; lit. 'Fragrant Camp') after Xiangying Village that hosts the township's government.

== Geography ==
Xiangying Township is situated at the foothill of Mount Jinyang, which is a part of the larger Yan Mountain Range. Baihepu Reservoir is at the north of the region.

== History ==
Timeline of Xiangying's History
Year	Status	Part of
1958 - 1961	Xiangying Production Team, within Dongfeng People's Commune	Yanqing County, Beijing
1961 - 1983	Xiangying People's Commune	Yanqing County, Beijing
1983 - 2015	Xiangying Township (Baihepu Township joined in 1997)	Yanqing County, Beijing
2015–present	Xiangying Township (Baihepu Township joined in 1997)	Yanqing District, Beijing

== Administrative divisions ==
In the year 2021, Xiangying Township consisted of 21 subdivisions, where 1 of them was a community and the rest were villages. They are, by the order of their Administrative Division Codes:

Subdivision names	Name transliterations	Type
香营乡	Xiangyingxiang	Community
屈家窑	Jujiayao	Village
黑峪口	Heiyukou	Village
上垙	Shangguang	Village
下垙	Xiaguang	Village
山底下	Shandixia	Village
东白庙	Dongbaimiao	Village
孟官屯	Mengguantun	Village
小堡	Xiaopu	Village
香营	Xiangying	Village
新庄堡	Xinzhuangpu	Village
后所屯	Housuotun	Village
里仁堡	Lirenpu	Village
聂庄	Niehzuang	Village
庄科	Zhuangke	Village
高家窑	Gaojiayao	Village
小川	Xiaochuan	Village
八道河	Badaohe	Village
南窑	Nanyao	Village
三道沟	Sandaogou	Village
东边	Dongbian	Village

== See also ==
- List of township-level divisions of Beijing
