= Zhenzhuquan =

Zhenzhuquan Township 珍珠泉乡
- Township
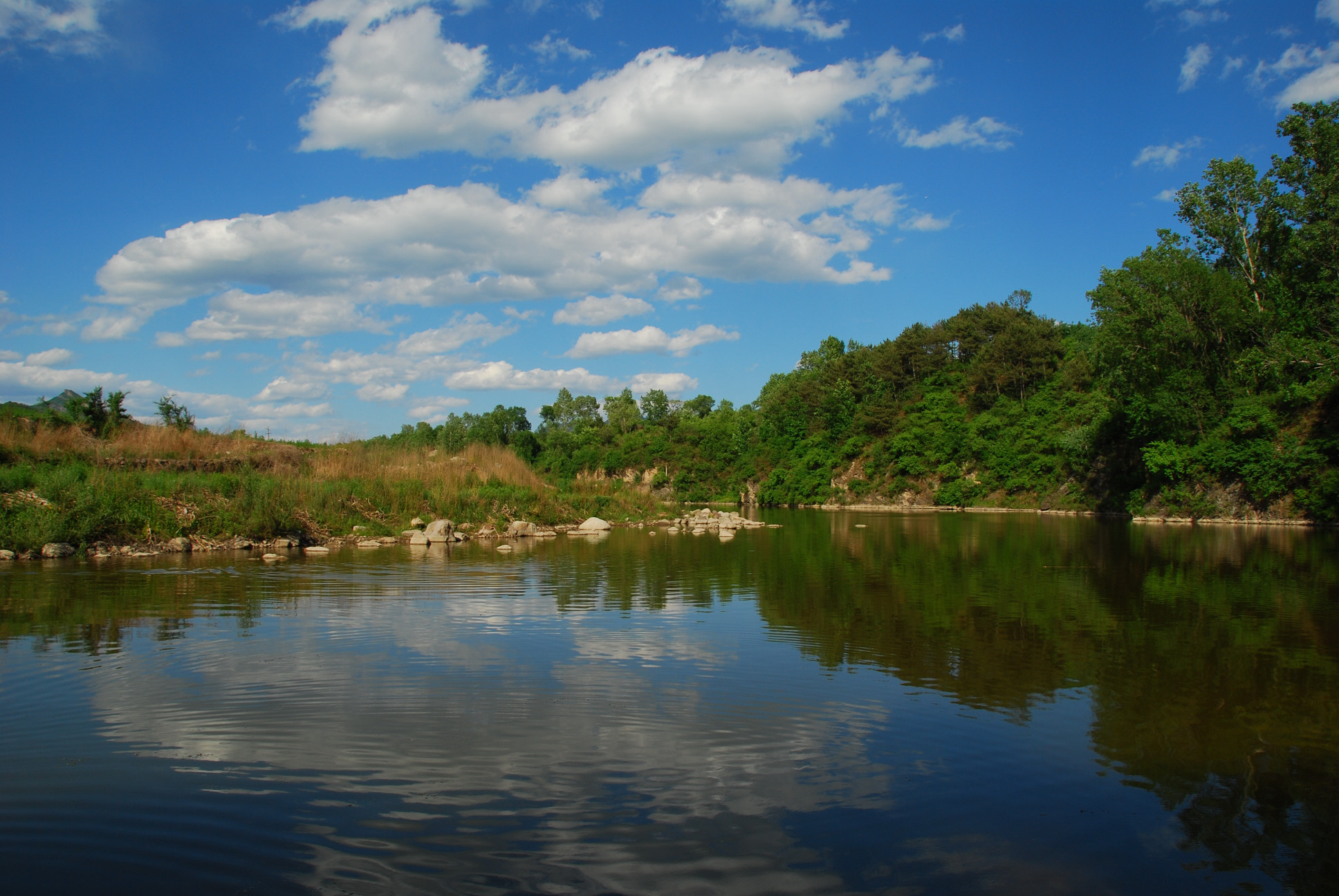
- Zhenzhu Spring, 2009

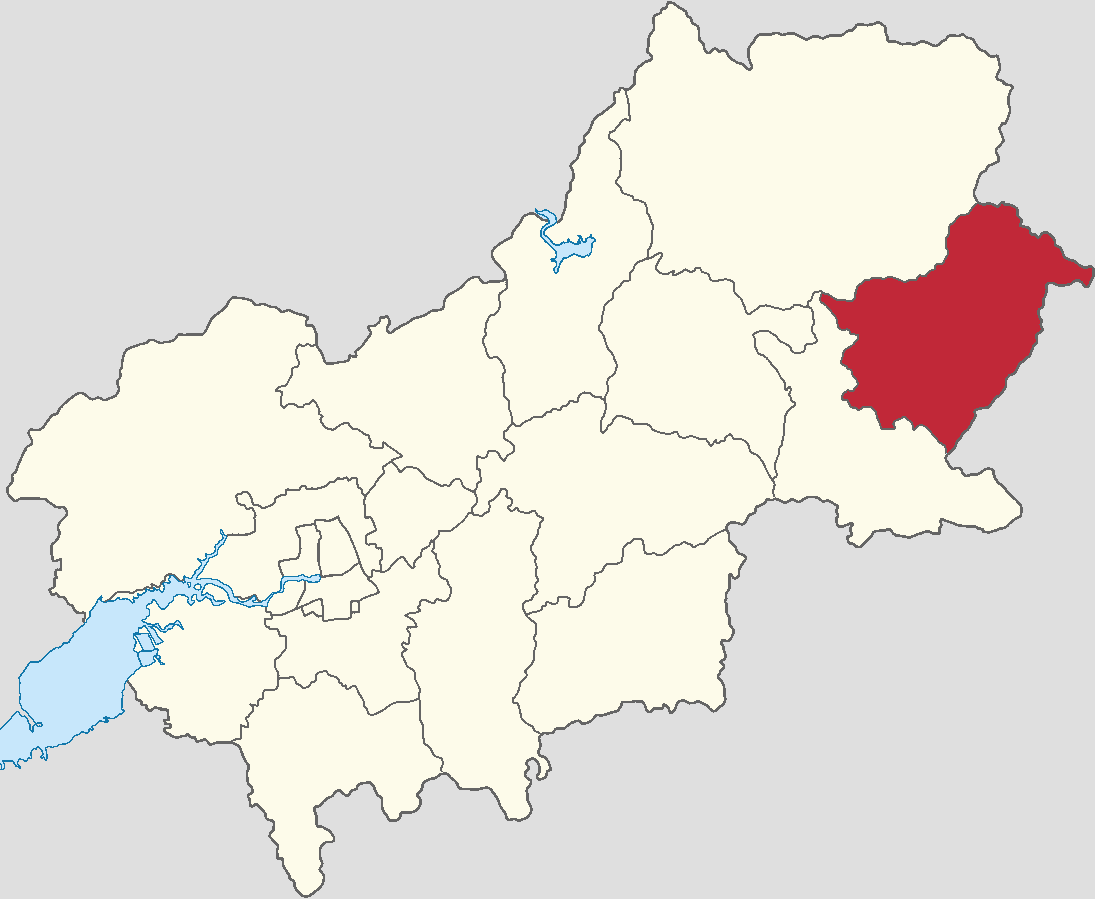
- Location in Yanqing District

- Location within Beijing Location within China
- Coordinates: 40°33′31″N 116°25′08″E
- Country: China
- Municipality: Beijing
- District: Yanqing
- Village-level Divisions: 1 community 15 villages

Area
  - Total: 142.6 km^{2} (55.1 sq mi)
- Elevation: 612 m (2,008 ft)

Population (2020)
  - Total: 2,469
  - Density: 17.31/km^{2} (44.84/sq mi)
- Time zone: UTC+8 (China Standard)
- Postal code: 102107
- Area code: 010

Zhenzhuquan Township (simplified Chinese: 珍珠泉乡; traditional Chinese: 珍珠泉鄉; pinyin: Zhēnzhūquán Xiāng) is a township in northeastern part of Yanqing District, Beijing, China. It borders Qianjiadian and Baoshan Towns in its north, Liulimiao Town in its east, and Sihai Town in its southeast. It was home to 2,469 residents in 2020.

The name Zhenzhuquan (Chinese: 珍珠泉; lit. 'Pearl Spring') comes from Zhenzhu Spring that is located within the town.

== Geography ==
Zhenzhuquan Township is located along the banks of Liuli River, and is surrounded by the Yan Mountain Range.

== History ==
Timetable of Zhenzhuquan Township
Year	Status	Within
1947 - 1953		Sihai County, Hebei
1953 - 1955	Zhenzhuquan Township Xiaochuan Township	Yanqing County, Hebei
1955 - 1958	Zhenzhuquan People's Commune Xiaochuan Township	Yanqing County, Hebei
1958 - 1961	Zhenzhuquan People's Commune Xiaozhong Production Team	Yanqing County, Beijing
1961 - 1966	Zhenzhuquan People's Commune Xiaozhong People's Commune	Yanqing County, Beijing
1966 - 1974	Zhenzhuquan People's Commune	Yanqing County, Beijing
1974 - 1983	Zhenzhuquan People's Commune Xiaozhong People's Commune	Yanqing County, Beijing
1983 - 1997	Zhenzhuquan Township Xiaochuan Township	Yanqing County, Beijing
1997 - 2015	Zhenzhuquan Township	Yanqing County, Beijing
2015–present	Zhenzhuquan Township	Yanqing District, Beijing

== Administrative divisions ==
By the end of 2021, Zhenzhuquan Township oversaw 16 subdivisions, with 1 of them being a community and the other 15 being villages. They are listed as follows:

Subdivision names	Name transliterations	Type
珍珠泉乡	Zhenzhuquanxiang	Community
珍珠泉	Zhenzhuquan	Village
称沟湾	Chenggouwan	Village
庙梁	Miaoliang	Village
下水沟	Xia Shuigou	Village
上水沟	Shang Shuigou	Village
下花楼	Xiahualou	Village
八亩地	Bamudi	Village
转山子	Zhuanshanzi	Village
水泉子	Shuiquanzi	Village
双金草	Shuangjincao	Village
小川	Xiaochuan	Village
小铺	Xiaopu	Village
仓米道	Cangmidao	Village
南天门	Nantianmen	Village
桃条沟	Taotiaogou	Village

== See also ==
- List of township-level divisions of Beijing
