= Rulin Subdistrict =

Rulin Subdistrict 儒林街道
- Subdistrict
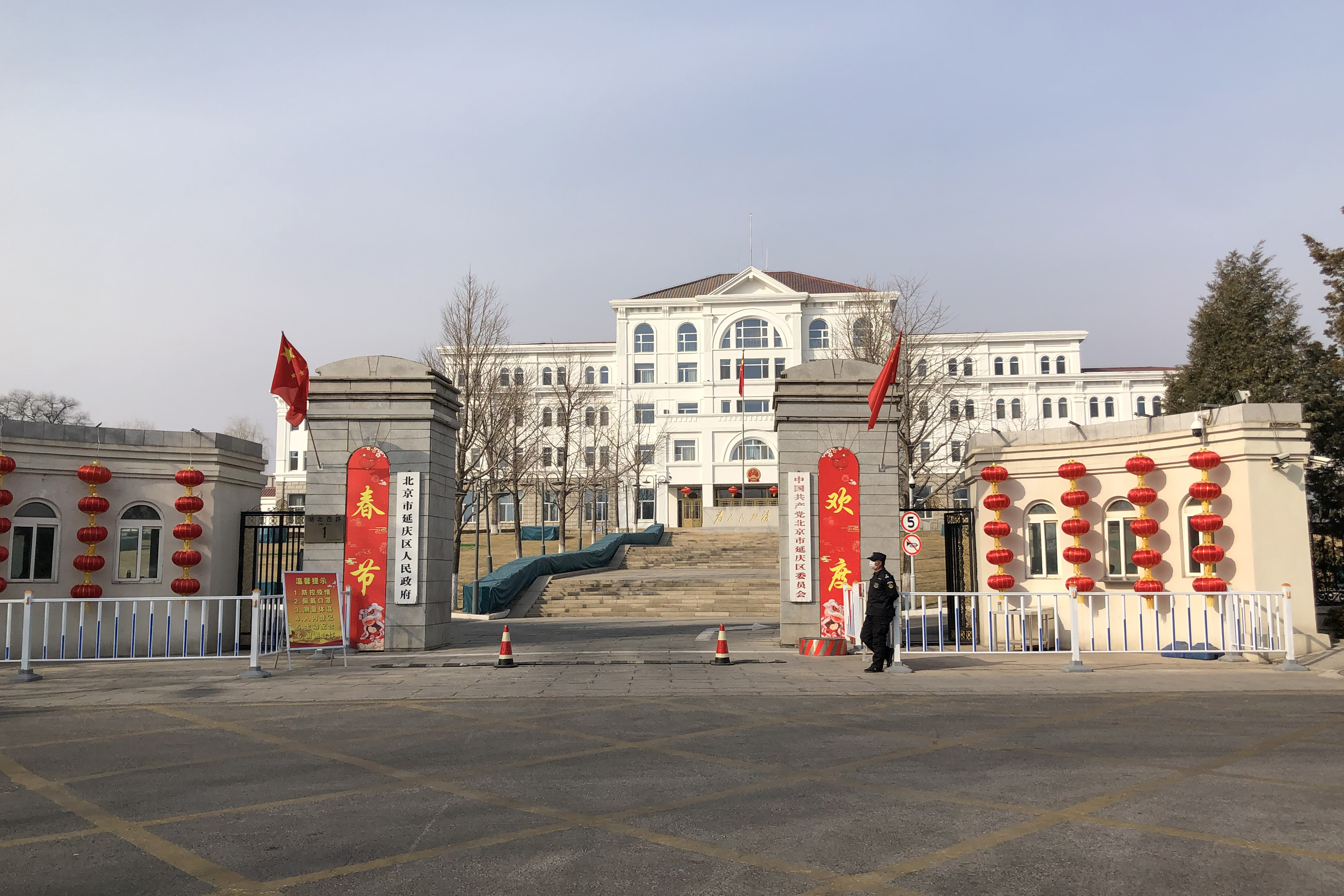
- Government of Yanqing District on the south of the subdistrict, 2021

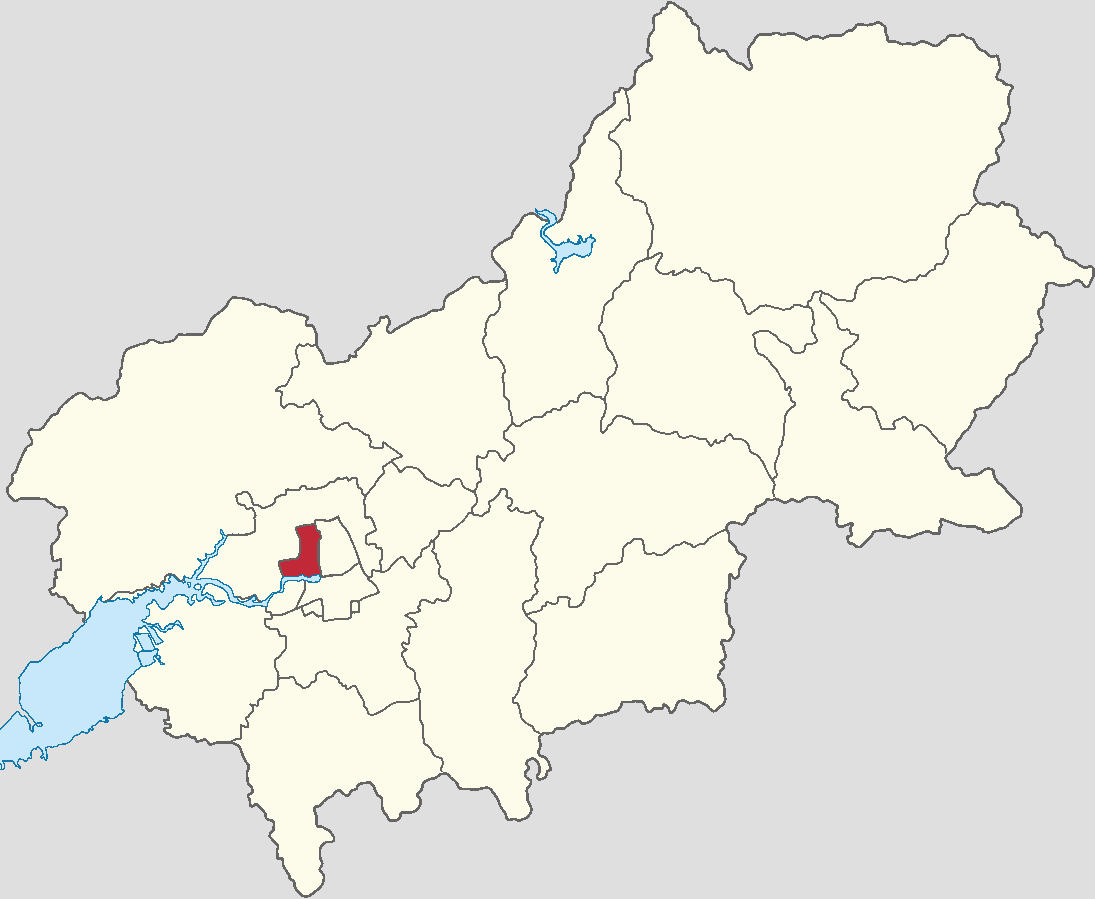
- Location of Rulin Subdistrict within Yanqing District

- Location within Beijing Location within China
- Coordinates: 40°27′30″N 115°58′23″E
- Country: China
- Municipality: Beijing
- District: Yanqing
- Village-level Divisions: 10 communities

Area
  - Total: 1.82 km^{2} (0.70 sq mi)
- Elevation: 485 m (1,591 ft)

Population (2020)
  - Total: 28,230
  - Density: 15,500/km^{2} (40,200/sq mi)
- Time zone: UTC+8 (China Standard)
- Postal code: 102100
- Area code: 010

Rulin Subdistrict (Chinese: 儒林街道; pinyin: Rúlín Jiēdào) is a subdistrict situated in western Yanqing District, Beijing, China. It shares border with Yanqing Town to its north and west, Xiangshuiyuan Subdistrict to its east, and Baiquan Subdistrict to its south. The result of the 2020 Chinese Census determined that Rulin's population was 28,230.

The subdistrict was formed in 2009, and its name Rulin (Chinese: 儒林; lit. 'Scholar Forest') comes from Rulinyuan Microdistrict within its borders.

== Geography ==
The subdistrict is situated at the north bank of Guishui River, with S323 Expressway passing through the southern region.

== Administrative divisions ==
As of the time in writing, 10 residential communities constituted Rulin subdistrict, all of which are listed in the table below:

Subdivision names	Name transliterations
康安	Kang'an
永安	Yong'an
温泉南区东里	Wenquan Nanqu Dongli
温泉南区西里	Wenquan Nanqu Xili
胜芳园	Shengfangyuan
儒林苑	Rulinyuan
温泉馨苑	Wenquan Xinyuan
悦安居	Yue'anju
格兰山水二期	Gelan Shanshui Erqu
格兰山水二期南区	Gelan Shanshui Erqu Nanqu

== See also ==
- List of township-level divisions of Beijing
