= Jingzhuang =

Jingzhuang Town 井庄镇
- Town
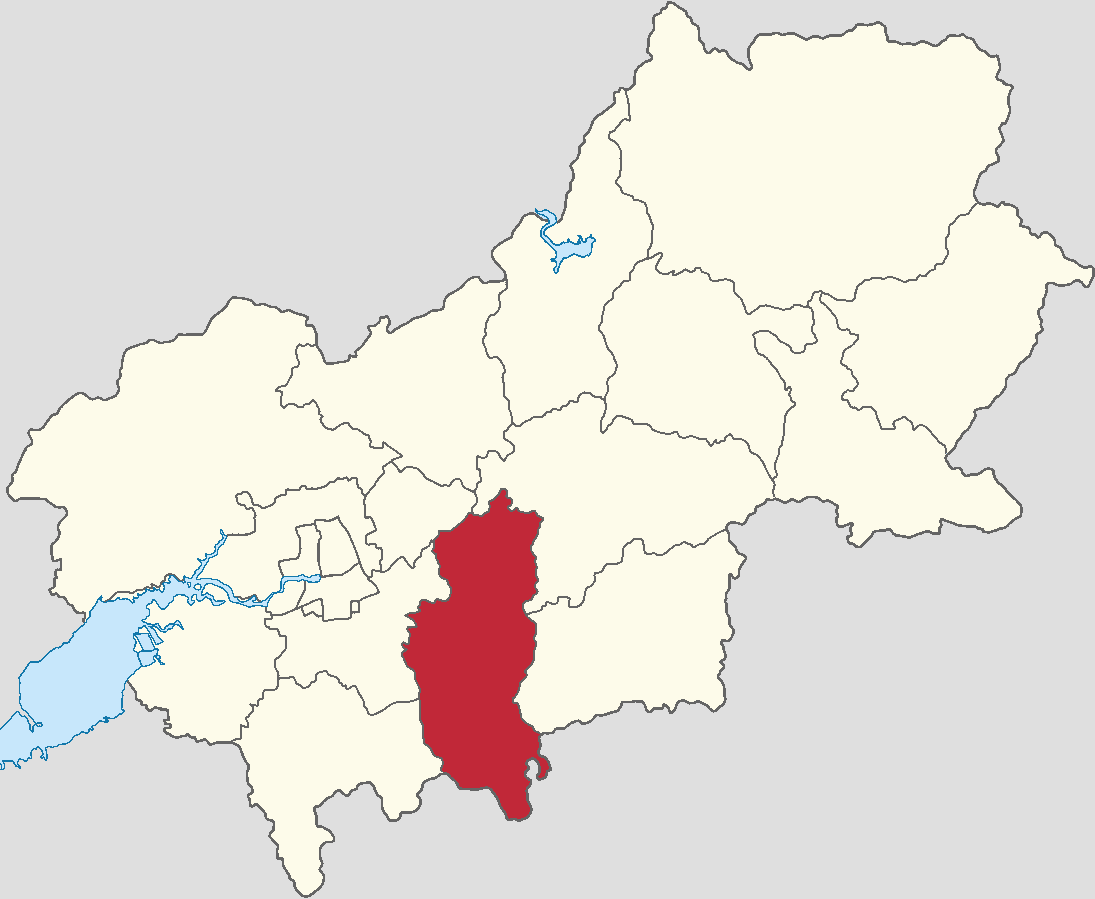
- Location within Yanqing District

- Location within Beijing Location within China
- Coordinates: 40°28′13″N 116°05′13″E
- Country: China
- Municipality: Beijing
- District: Yanqing
- Village-level Divisions: 1 community 31 villages

Area
  - Total: 126.4 km^{2} (48.8 sq mi)
- Elevation: 520 m (1,710 ft)

Population (2020)
  - Total: 9,500
  - Density: 75/km^{2} (190/sq mi)
- Time zone: UTC+8 (China Standard)
- Postal code: 102105
- Area code: 010

Jingzhuang Town (simplified Chinese: 井庄镇; traditional Chinese: 井莊鎮; pinyin: Jǐngzhuāng Zhèn) is a town in the Yanqing District of Beijing. It borders Shenjiaying Town in the north, Yongning Town and Dazhuangke Township in the east, Shisanling and Nankou Towns in the south, as well as Badaling and Dayushu Towns in the west. According to the 2020 census, population for this town was 9,500.

The town is named after Jingjiazhuang Village, the seat of the town's government.

== Geography ==
The town borders Guishui River in the north and parts of Yan Mountain Range in the other directions. Datong–Qinhuangdao railway and National Highway 110 both pass through the town.

== History ==
Timeline of Jingzhuang's History
Year	Status	Within
1940 - 1945		Changyan United County
1945 - 1948		Yanqing County, Chahar
1948 - 1949	2nd District	Yanqing County, Chahar
1949 - 1952	Dabailao District	Yanqing County, Chahar
1952 - 1956	Dabailao District	Yanqing County, Hebei
1956 - 1958	Jingjiazhuang Township	Yanqing County, Hebei
1958 - 1961	Jingjiazhuang Production Team, part of Dongfeng People's Commune	Yanqing County, Beijing
1961 - 1983	Jingjiazhuang People's Commune	Yanqing County, Beijing
1983 - 2000	Jingjiazhuang Township	Yanqing County, Beijing
2000 - 2015	Jingzhuang Town (Merged with Erdaohe Township in 2000)	Yanqing County, Beijing
2015–present	Jingzhuang Town (Merged with Erdaohe Township in 2000)	Yanqing District, Beijing

== Administrative divisions ==
As of 2021, Jingzhuang Town had direct jurisdiction over 32 subdivisions, of which 1 was a community and the others were villages. They are listed below:

Subdivision names	Name transliterations	Type
井庄镇	Jingzhuangzhen	Community
南老君堂	Nan Laojuntang	Village
艾官营	Aiguanying	Village
宝林寺	Baolinsi	Village
东小营	Dongxiaoying	Village
王木营	Wangmuying	Village
房老营	Fanglaoying	Village
井家庄	Jingjiazhuang	Village
小胡家营	Xiao Hujiaying	Village
东石河	Dongshihe	Village
三司	Sansi	Village
二司	Ersi	Village
柳沟	Liugou	Village
果树园	Guoshuyuan	Village
王仲营	Wangzhongying	Village
东红山	Donghongshan	Village
张伍堡	Zhangwupu	Village
西红山	Xihongshan	Village
八家	Bajia	Village
东沟	Donggou	Village
西二道河	Xi Erdaohe	Village
窑湾	Yaowan	Village
老银庄	Laoyinzhuang	Village
冯家庙	Fengjiamiao	Village
孟家窑	Mengjiayao	Village
曹碾	Caonian	Village
箭杆岭	Jianganling	Village
莲花滩	Lianhuatan	Village
门泉石	Menquanshi	Village
碓臼石	Duijiushi	Village
北地	Beidi	Village
西三岔	Xisancha	Village

== See also ==
- List of township-level divisions of Beijing
