= Baiquan Subdistrict =

Baiquan Subdistrict 百泉街道
- Subdistrict
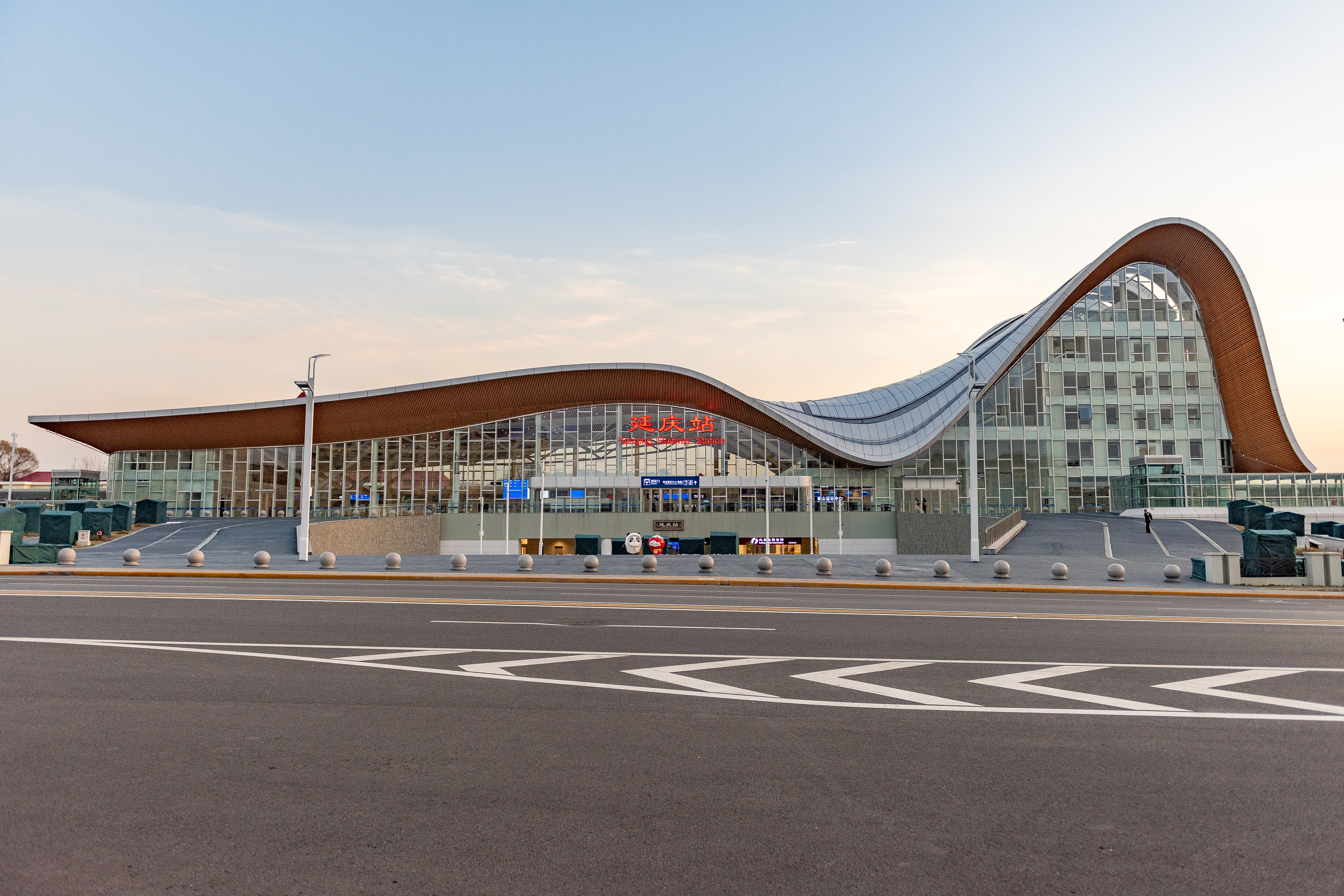
- Yanqing Railway Station, 2020

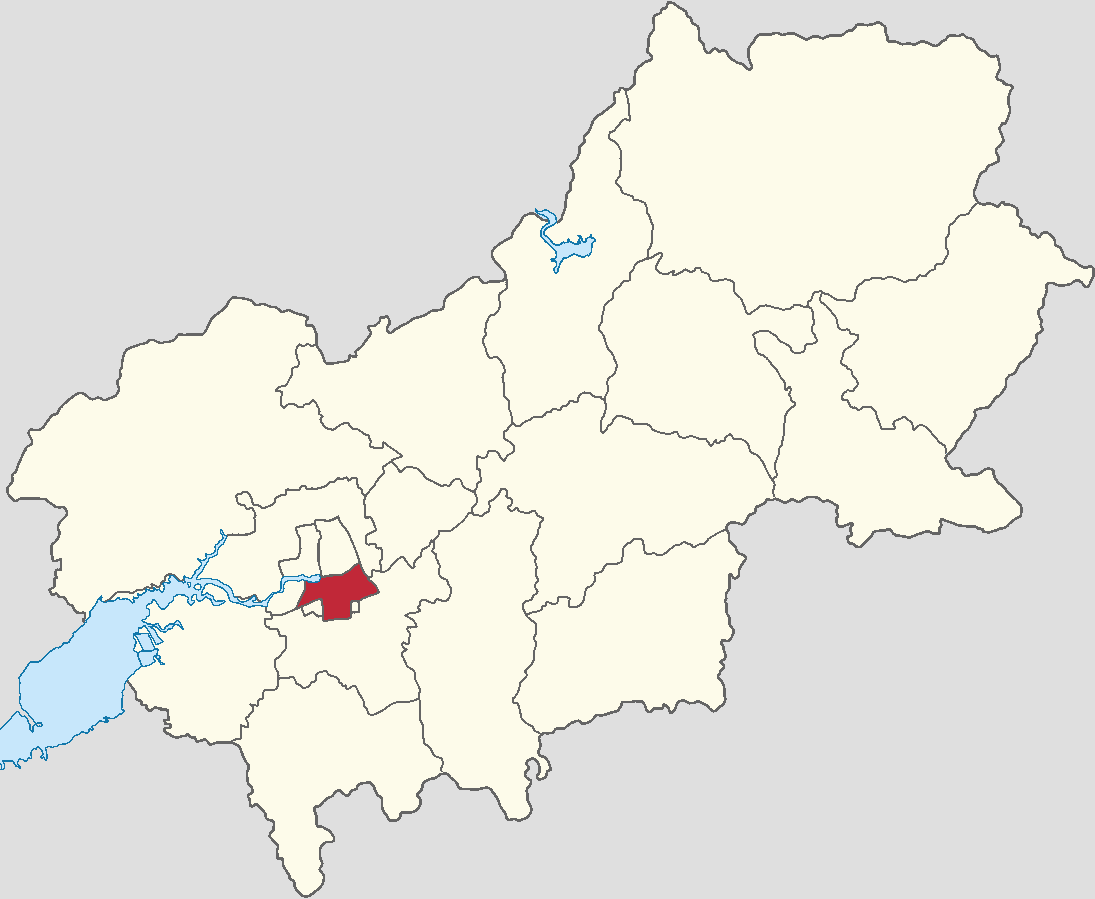
- Location of Baiquan Subdistrict within Yanqing District

- Location within Beijing Location within China
- Coordinates: 40°26′53″N 115°59′28″E
- Country: China
- Municipality: Beijing
- District: Yanqing
- Village-level Divisions: 9 communities

Area
  - Total: 3.28 km^{2} (1.27 sq mi)
- Elevation: 495 m (1,624 ft)

Population (2020)
  - Total: 36,013
  - Density: 11,000/km^{2} (28,400/sq mi)
- Time zone: UTC+8 (China Standard)
- Postal code: 102100
- Area code: 010

Baiquan Subdistrict (Chinese: 百泉街道; pinyin: Bǎiquán Jiēdào) is a subdistrict situated inside of Yanqing District, Beijing, China. It borders Rulin and Xiangshuiyuan Subdistricts to its north, Dayushu Town to its east and south, and exclaves of Yanqing Town to its east, west and south. In 2020, its total population was 36,013.

The subdistrict was established in 2009 from part of Yanqing Town. It was named after Baiquan (Chinese: 百泉; lit. 'Hundred Springs') Street within it.

== Geography ==
The subdistrict is bounded by Guishui River to its north. Yankang Road, which is part of the larger G234 Xingyang Road, passes through this region.

== Administrative divisions ==
Below is a list of the 9 communities that Baiquan Subdistrict was consisted of in 2021:

Subdivision names	Name transliterations
湖南	Hunan
燕水佳园	Yanshui Jiayuan
颖泽洲	Yingzezhou
振兴北	Zhenxing Bei
振兴南	Zhenxing Nan
莲花苑	Lianhuayuan
国润家园	Guorun Jiayuan
舜泽园	Shunzeyuan
上都首府家园	Shangdu Shoufu Jiayuan

== See also ==
- List of township-level divisions of Beijing
