= Xiangshuiyuan Subdistrict =

Xiangshuiyuan Subdistrict 香水园街道
- Subdistrict
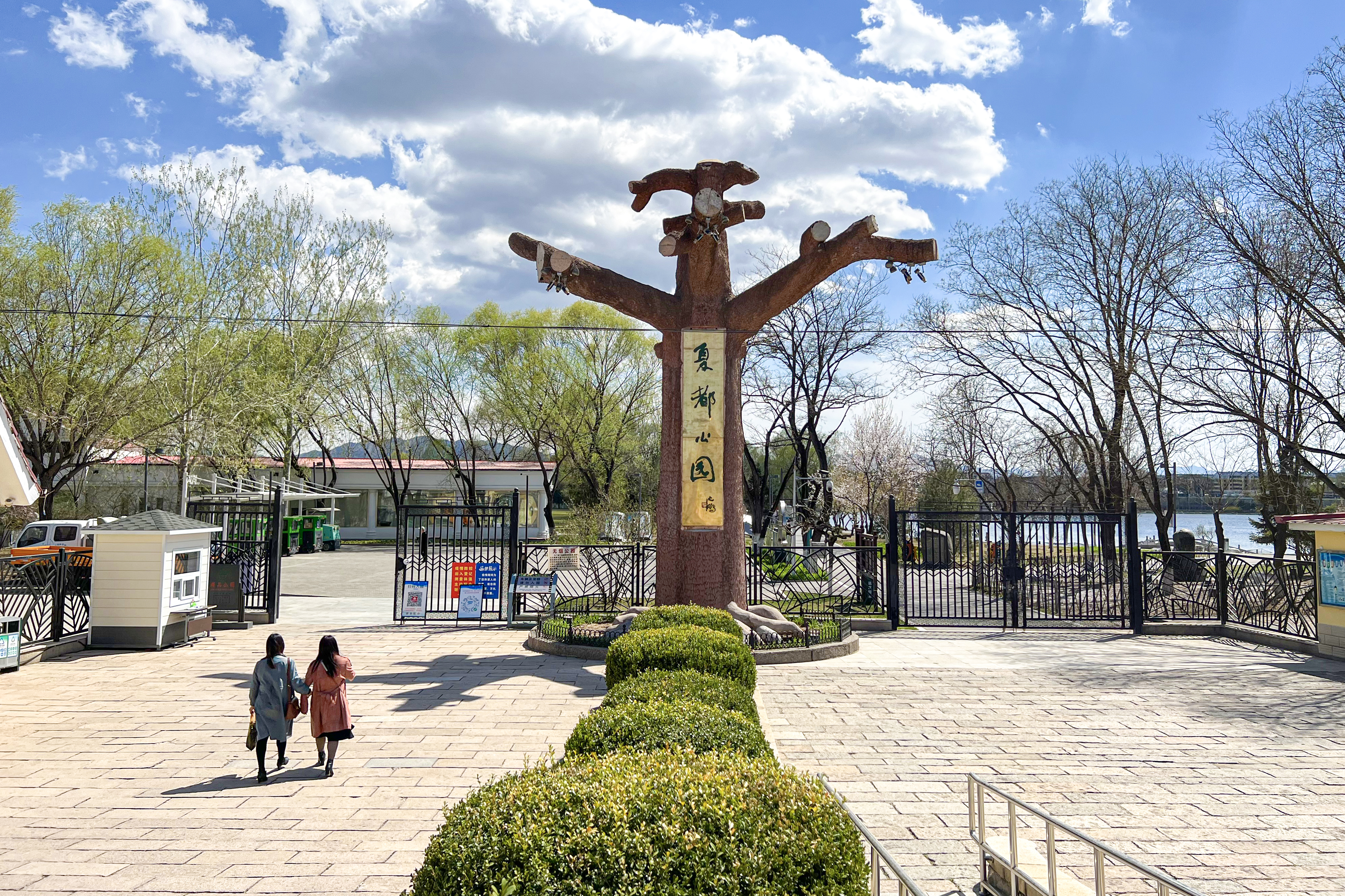
- Xidu Park north of Guishui River, 2022

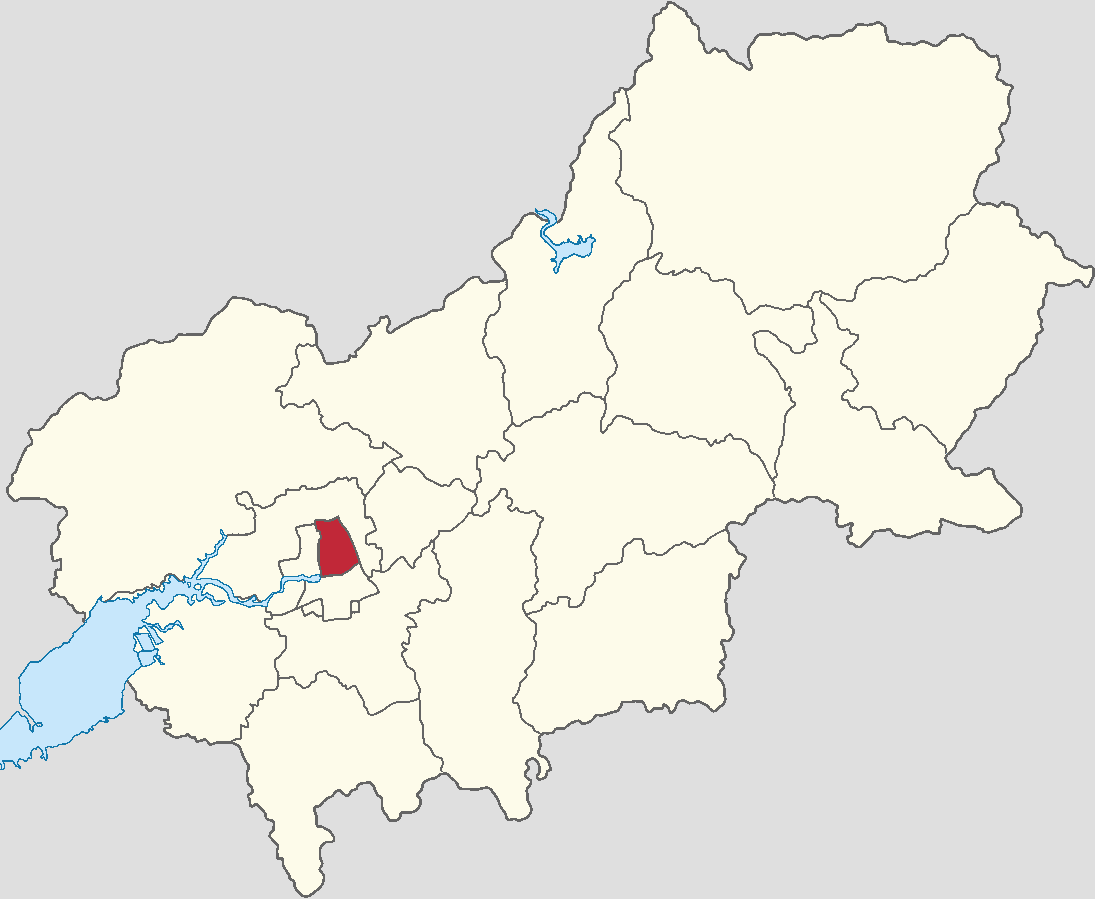
- Location of Xiangshuiyuan Subdistrict within Yanqing District

- Location within Beijing Location within China
- Coordinates: 40°34′12″N 116°08′29″E
- Country: China
- Municipality: Beijing
- District: Yanqing
- Village-level Divisions: 16 communities

Area
  - Total: 3.19 km^{2} (1.23 sq mi)
- Elevation: 482 m (1,581 ft)

Population (2020)
  - Total: 48,251
  - Density: 15,100/km^{2} (39,200/sq mi)
- Time zone: UTC+8 (China Standard)
- Postal code: 102100
- Area code: 010

Xiangshuiyuan Subdistrict (simplified Chinese: 香水园街道; traditional Chinese: 香水園街道; pinyin: Xiāngshuǐyuán Jiēdào) is a subdistrict at the western part of Yanqing District, Beijing, China. It shares border with Yanqing Town to its north and east, Baiquan Subdistrict to its south, and Rulin Subdistrict to its west. In 2020, the subdistrict had 48,251.

The subdistrict was created from part of Yanqing Town in 2009. Its name literally means "Perfume Garden".

== Geography ==
Xiangshuiyuan Subdistrict is on the northern bank of Guishui River.

== Administrative divisions ==
Below is a list of the 16 communities that made up Xiangshuiyuan Subdistrict at the end of 2021:

Subdivision names	Name transliterations
东外	Dongwai
川北东	Chuanbei Dong
川北西	Chuanbei Xi
高塔	Gaota
恒安	Heng'an
石河营东	Shiheying Dong
石河营西	Shiheying Xi
双路	Shuanglu
泰安	Tai'an
新兴东	Xinxing Dong
新兴西	Xinxing Xi
兴运嘉园	Xingyun Jiayuan
和润	Herun
庆园	Qingyuan
集贤	Jixian
庆隆	Qinglong

== Gallery ==
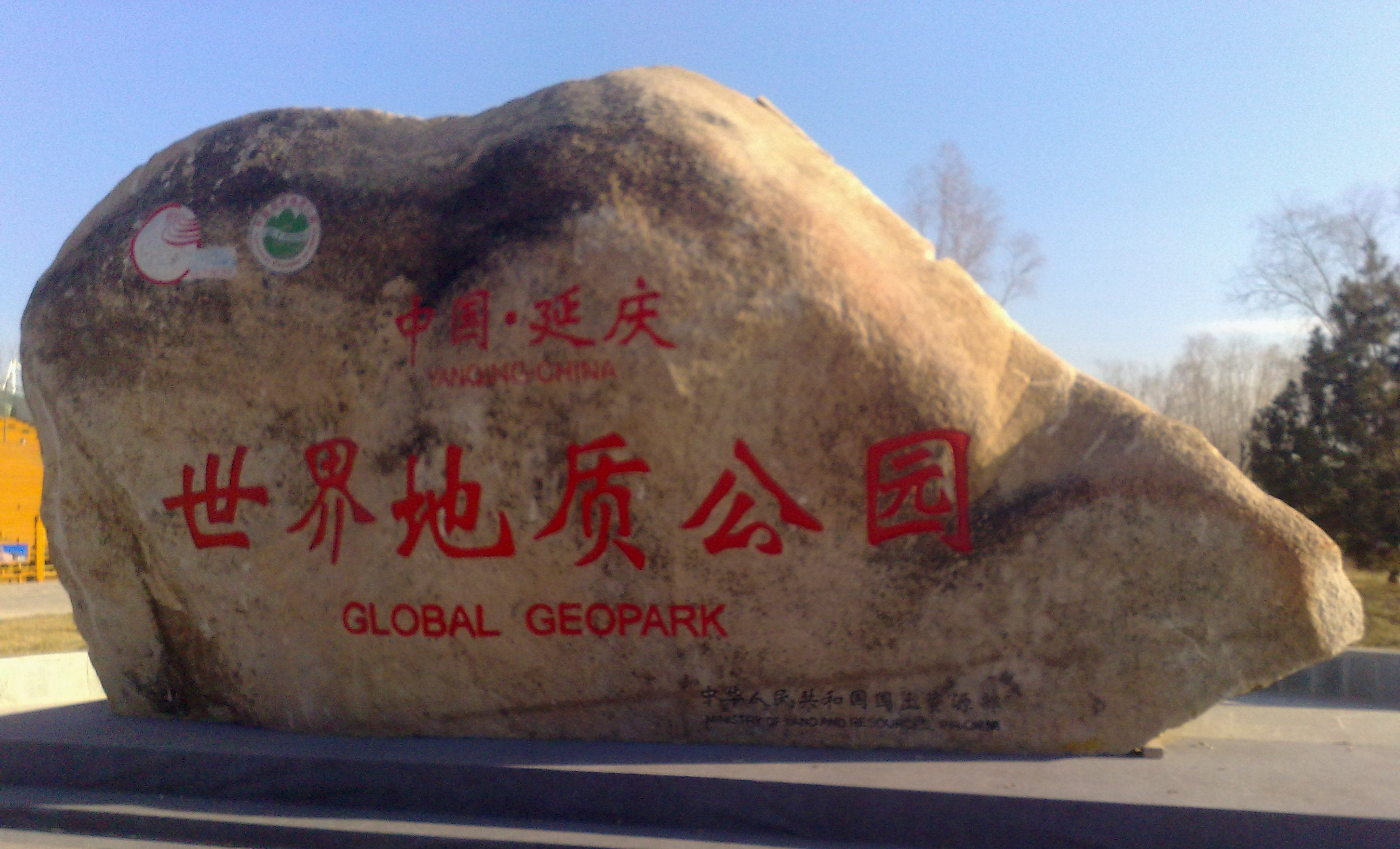
Beijing Yanqing World Geology Park in the south, 2014

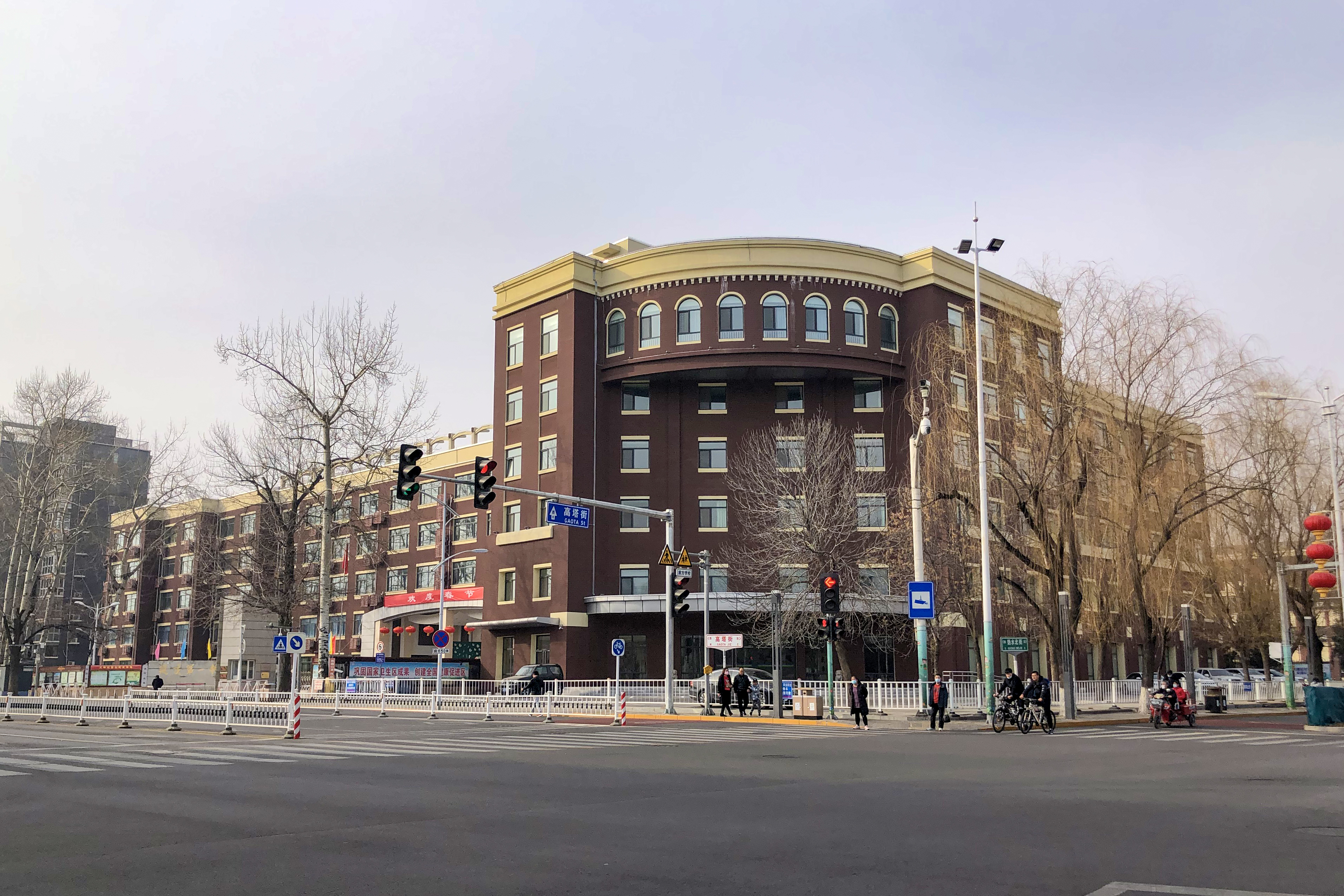
Yanqing No.1 Middle School, 2021

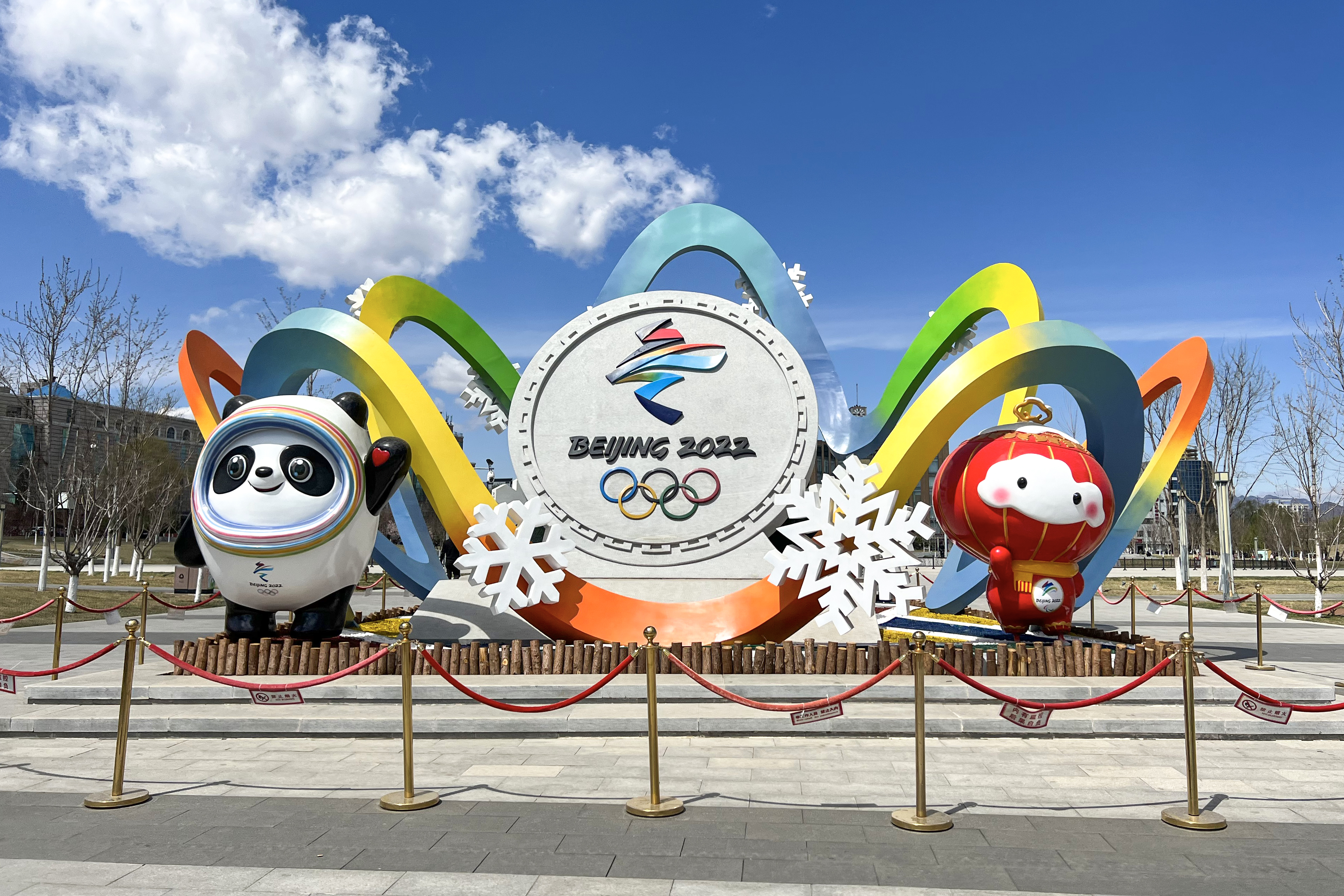
Winter Olympic decoration at Guichuan Square, 2022

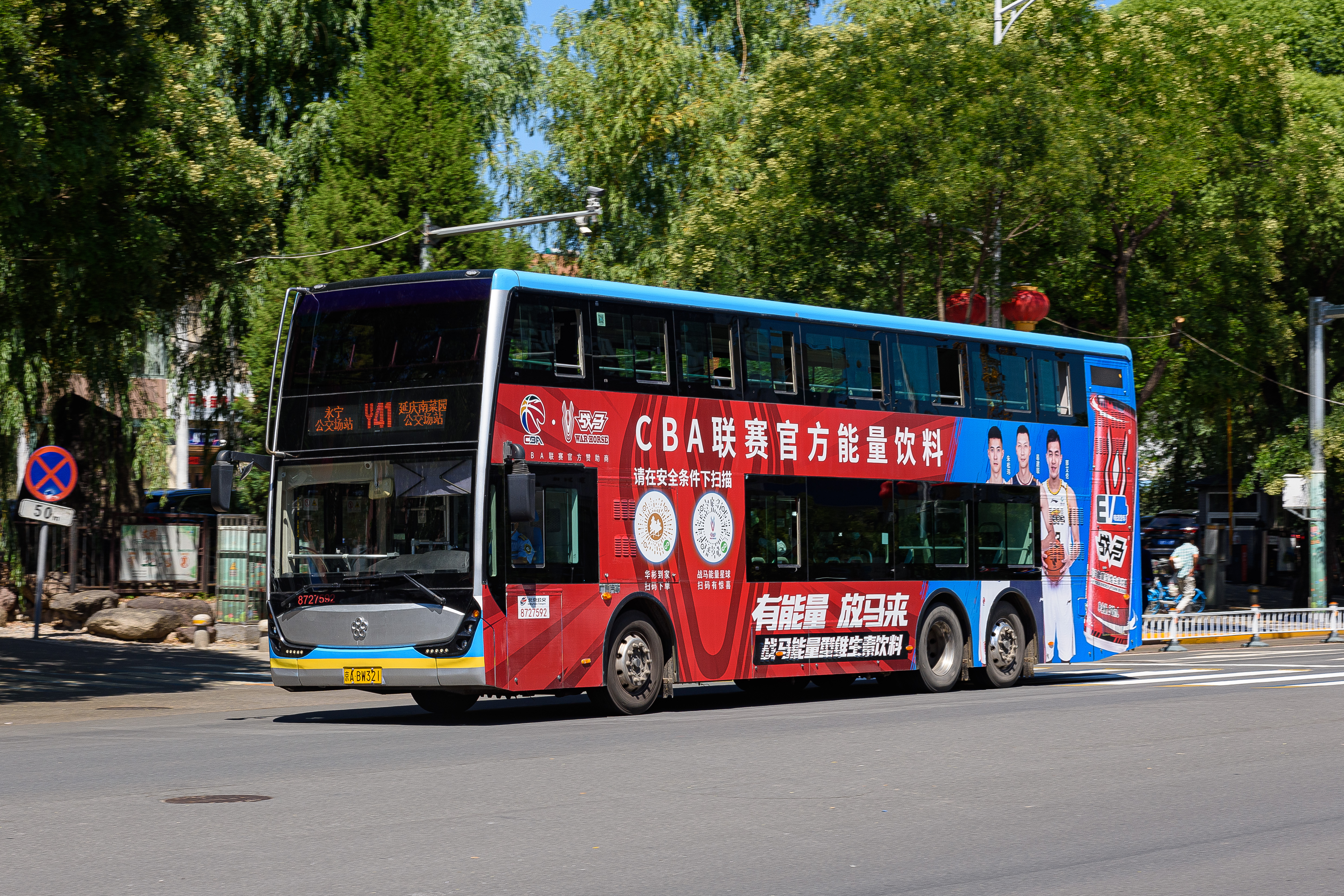
Bus on the Dong Outer Street, 2022

== See also ==
- List of township-level divisions of Beijing
