= Yanqing, Beijing =

Yanqing 延庆区
- District
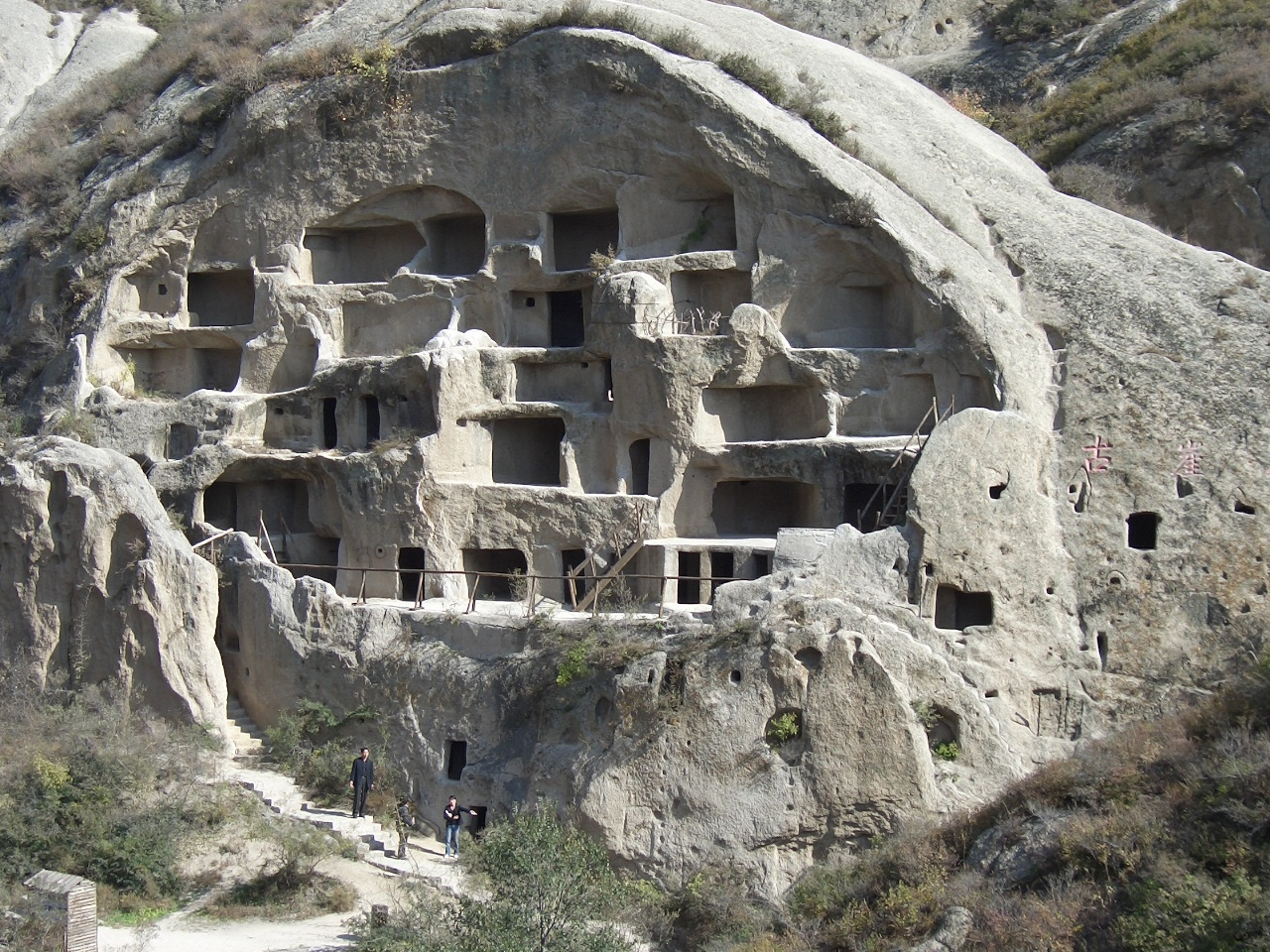
- Ancient cave dwellings of the Guyaju Ruins are located in Yanqing.

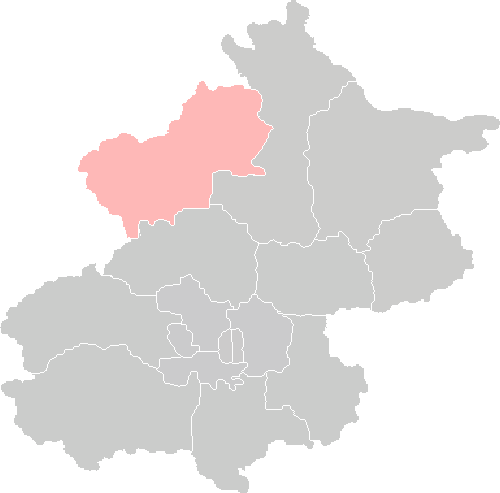
- Location of Yanqing in Beijing
- Country: People's Republic of China
- Municipality: Beijing
- Township-level divisions: 3 subdistricts 11 towns 4 townships
- Seat: Rulin Subdistrict

Area
  - Total: 1,994.88 km^{2} (770.23 sq mi)

Population (2020 census)
  - Total: 345,671
  - Density: 173.279/km^{2} (448.791/sq mi)
- Time zone: UTC+8 (China Standard)
- Postal code: 102100
- Area code: 0010
- Website: http://www.bjyq.gov.cn/

Yanqing
- Traditional Chinese: 延慶
- Simplified Chinese: 延庆
- Postal: Yenking
Transcriptions
Standard Mandarin
- Hanyu Pinyin: Yánqìng
- Wade–Giles: Yen^{2}-ch'ing^{4}

Yanqing District (Chinese: 延庆区; pinyin: Yánqìng Qū), formerly known as Yanqing County before 2015, is a district of the municipality of Beijing located northwest of the city proper of Beijing, 74km away from the city center. The district consists of 3 subdistricts, 11 towns and 4 townships, and borders the Beijing districts of Huairou to the east and Changping to the south as well as the Hebei counties of Huailai to the west and Chicheng to the north. The district hosted the Expo 2019, and hosted alpine skiing, bobsled, luge and skeleton during the 2022 Winter Olympics.

== History ==
In the Tang dynasty, Guichuan County, named after the Gui River, was established and belonged to the Gui Prefecture in Hebei, with a defensive military city. Eventually in 1952, it was reassigned to the Zhangjiakou Special Zone [zh] in Hebei Province, and in 1958, it was transferred to Beijing. In November 2015, the State Council of the People's Republic of China approved the adjustment of the administrative divisions of Beijing, and Yanqing County was abolished and established as a district. Yanqing District became sister cities with Dongdaemun District, Seoul, when they established friendly relations in 1997 and signed a cultural and sports exchange agreement and an economic exchange agreement in 2011.

== Climate ==
Yanqing District has a monsoon-influenced humid continental climate (Köppen Dwa/Dwb), a transitional zone between temperate and mid-temperate, semi-arid and semi-humid zones. The higher parts have a unique climate, with cold winters and mild summers, with Yanqing being known as Beijing's "summer capital". The climate is cold in winter and warm in summer, with an average annual temperature of 9.6 °C (49.3 °F). It has an area of 105 square kilometers in the tropical zone, with abundant shallow geothermal resources. With 2,623.4 hours of sunshine per year, it possesses the most abundant solar energy resources in Beijing. Also, Yanqing's wind resources account for 70% of those in Beijing Municipality.

The Yanqing Badaling Great Wall Basin is surrounded by mountains on three sides in the north, south, east, and Guanting Reservoir to the west, namely the Yanhuai Basin. Yanqing is located in the east of the basin, with an average elevation of about 500 metres or 1,600 feet. Haituo Mountain, with an elevation of 2,241 metres or 7,352 feet, is the highest peak in the district and the second highest in Beijing Municipality.

Yanqing is surrounded by mountains to the north, east and south, and water to the west, with an average altitude of 500 metres or 1,600 feet above sea level, and is predominantly mountainous, with mountains accounting for 70% of the county's area. The forest greening rate of the entire region has reached 74%. In addition, Yanqing is rich in geothermal, solar, wind and other new and renewable energy sources, accounting for 25% of energy consumption, and is one of the first national green energy demonstration counties and a new and renewable energy demonstration area in Beijing.

The highest temperature recorded was 39 °C or 102.2 °F on June 10, 1961. Prior to 2016 the lowest temperature recorded was −27.3 °C or −17.1 °F on January 23, 1973, however, on January 23, 2016, the lowest temperature recorded was −29.8 °C or −21.6 °F, the lowest temperature recorded in Beijing in 30 years. The year with the highest precipitation from June to August was 1964 with 747.1 millimetres or 29.41 inches, and the year with the lowest was 1965 with 274 millimetres or 10.79 inches. The average annual sunshine in one district of Yanqing County is 2623.4 hours, with an annual sunshine percentage of 60%, the highest sunshine hours and solar radiation in Beijing.

In 2022, the annual average concentration value of PM2.5 in Yanqing District was 27 micrograms per cubic meter, 7 micrograms per cubic meter lower than the urban area of Beijing (34 micrograms per cubic meter), ranking first in air quality over other districts in Beijing.

Climate data for Yanqing District, elevation 488 m (1,601 ft), (1991–2020 normals, extremes 1961–present)
Month	Jan	Feb	Mar	Apr	May	Jun	Jul	Aug	Sep	Oct	Nov	Dec	Year
Record high °C (°F)	11.1 (52.0)	20.2 (68.4)	28.3 (82.9)	35.7 (96.3)	38.8 (101.8)	39.2 (102.6)	39.0 (102.2)	37.1 (98.8)	34.3 (93.7)	29.0 (84.2)	23.9 (75.0)	16.4 (61.5)	39.2 (102.6)
Mean daily maximum °C (°F)	−0.9 (30.4)	3.7 (38.7)	10.7 (51.3)	18.9 (66.0)	25.1 (77.2)	28.4 (83.1)	29.5 (85.1)	28.5 (83.3)	24.1 (75.4)	17.1 (62.8)	7.6 (45.7)	0.4 (32.7)	16.1 (61.0)
Daily mean °C (°F)	−7.4 (18.7)	−3.4 (25.9)	3.7 (38.7)	12.0 (53.6)	18.3 (64.9)	22.1 (71.8)	24.1 (75.4)	22.8 (73.0)	17.4 (63.3)	10.1 (50.2)	1.4 (34.5)	−5.5 (22.1)	9.6 (49.3)
Mean daily minimum °C (°F)	−12.9 (8.8)	−9.1 (15.6)	−2.4 (27.7)	5.2 (41.4)	11.6 (52.9)	16.4 (61.5)	19.6 (67.3)	18.1 (64.6)	12.0 (53.6)	4.5 (40.1)	−3.5 (25.7)	−10.3 (13.5)	4.1 (39.4)
Record low °C (°F)	−27.3 (−17.1)	−26.5 (−15.7)	−22.7 (−8.9)	−7.8 (18.0)	−0.3 (31.5)	5.6 (42.1)	10.8 (51.4)	10.6 (51.1)	−1.6 (29.1)	−8.1 (17.4)	−19.8 (−3.6)	−24.0 (−11.2)	−27.3 (−17.1)
Average precipitation mm (inches)	2.0 (0.08)	3.5 (0.14)	9.0 (0.35)	18.5 (0.73)	43.2 (1.70)	74.8 (2.94)	121.6 (4.79)	79.2 (3.12)	59.9 (2.36)	23.8 (0.94)	11.4 (0.45)	2.3 (0.09)	449.2 (17.69)
Average precipitation days (≥ 0.1 mm)	1.5	2.1	3.3	4.7	7.3	11.6	12.8	10.5	8.0	5.3	2.9	1.5	71.5
Average snowy days	3.1	3.0	3.0	0.7	0	0	0	0	0	0.2	2.7	2.8	15.5
Average relative humidity (%)	47	43	41	42	48	62	74	75	70	61	54	48	55
Mean monthly sunshine hours	205.5	204.0	239.5	248.0	270.2	231.2	202.6	213.4	213.3	212.4	189.7	193.6	2,623.4
Percentage possible sunshine	68	67	64	62	60	52	45	51	58	62	64	67	60
Source: China Meteorological Administration

Climate data for Foyeding, Yanqing District, elevation 1,225 m (4,019 ft), (1991–2020 normals)
Month	Jan	Feb	Mar	Apr	May	Jun	Jul	Aug	Sep	Oct	Nov	Dec	Year
Mean daily maximum °C (°F)	−5.6 (21.9)	−1.7 (28.9)	5.3 (41.5)	13.5 (56.3)	19.6 (67.3)	23.0 (73.4)	24.0 (75.2)	23.0 (73.4)	18.6 (65.5)	11.9 (53.4)	2.8 (37.0)	−4.1 (24.6)	10.9 (51.5)
Daily mean °C (°F)	−10.2 (13.6)	−6.9 (19.6)	−0.5 (31.1)	7.3 (45.1)	13.7 (56.7)	17.6 (63.7)	19.6 (67.3)	18.6 (65.5)	13.9 (57.0)	6.9 (44.4)	−1.7 (28.9)	−8.5 (16.7)	5.8 (42.5)
Mean daily minimum °C (°F)	−13.5 (7.7)	−10.5 (13.1)	−4.6 (23.7)	2.9 (37.2)	9.2 (48.6)	13.6 (56.5)	16.4 (61.5)	15.4 (59.7)	10.5 (50.9)	3.4 (38.1)	−5.0 (23.0)	−11.7 (10.9)	2.2 (35.9)
Average precipitation mm (inches)	2.7 (0.11)	6.2 (0.24)	12.6 (0.50)	19.8 (0.78)	49.2 (1.94)	87.6 (3.45)	150.4 (5.92)	105.1 (4.14)	67.7 (2.67)	29.4 (1.16)	13.9 (0.55)	3.3 (0.13)	547.9 (21.59)
Average precipitation days (≥ 0.1 mm)	2.2	2.7	4.1	5.9	8.3	13.9	15.0	12.3	9.5	5.5	3.3	2.0	84.7
Average snowy days	3.0	3.8	4.4	2.7	0.1	0	0	0	0	1	3.6	2.6	21.2
Average relative humidity (%)	46	44	43	44	50	66	80	79	68	56	51	47	56
Mean monthly sunshine hours	216.4	211.8	259.5	262.2	279.7	234.9	189.4	207.5	218.1	227.0	200.7	205.4	2,712.6
Percentage possible sunshine	72	70	70	65	62	52	42	49	59	67	68	72	62
Source: China Meteorological Administration

== Administrative divisions ==
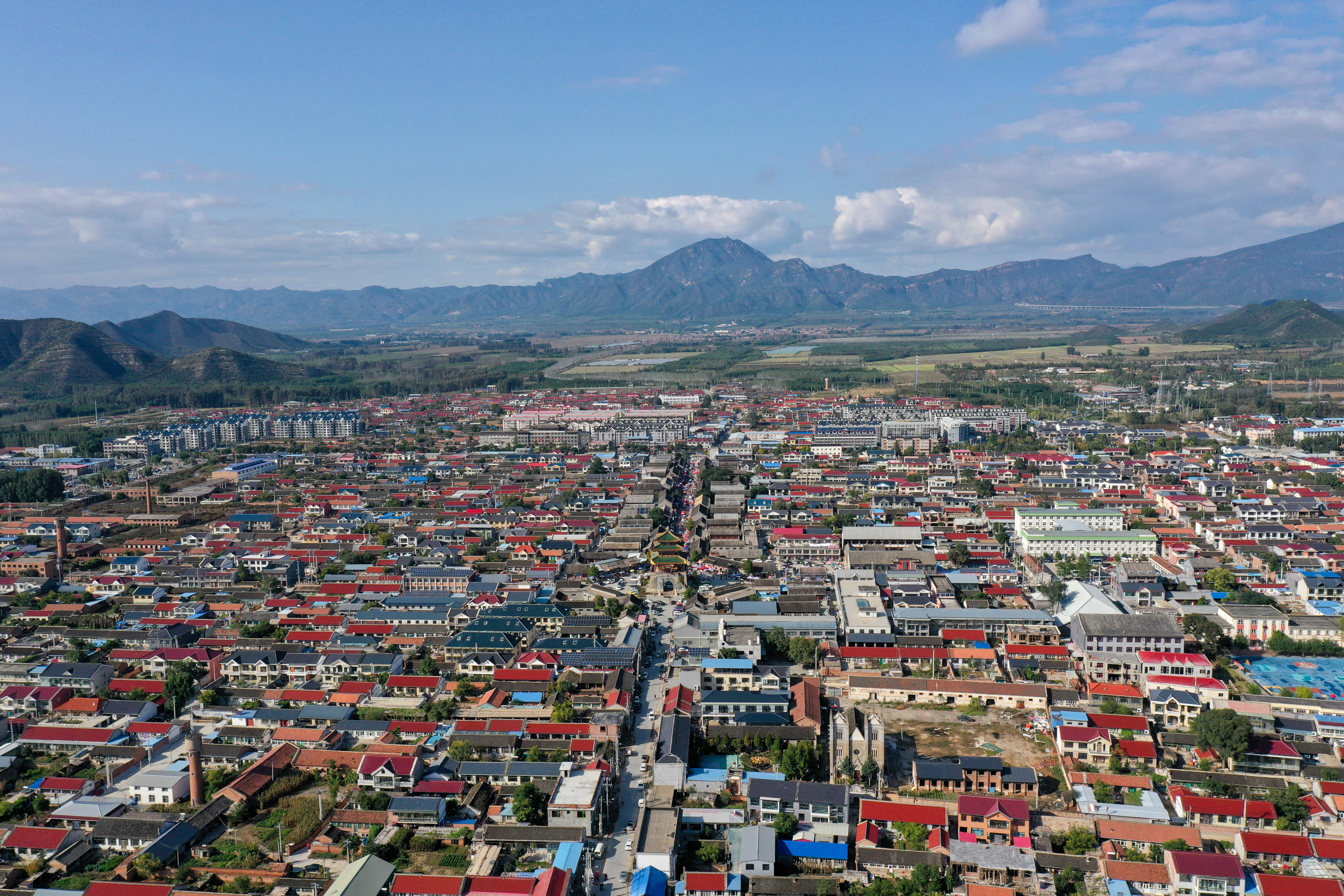
Yongning, in the northeastern part of Yanqing District

There are 3 subdistricts, 11 towns, and 4 townships in the district.

=== Urban area of Yanqing District ===
The Yanqing District government is located at Rulin Subdistrict. The urban area of Yanqing District is composed of Baiquan Subdistrict, Rulin Subdistrict, Xiangshuiyuan Subdistrict and Yanqing Town, with a population that exceeds 100,000. The urban area has a central business district and exhibition center.

=== List of subdivisions of Yanqing District ===
Name	Chinese (S)	Hanyu Pinyin	Population (2010)	Area (km^{2})
Rulin Subdistrict (district government seat)	儒林街道	Rúlín Jiēdào	125,659	14.26
Baiquan Subdistrict	百泉街道	Bǎiquán Jiēdào	125,659	6.20
Xiangshuiyuan Subdistrict	香水园街道	Xiāngshuǐyuán Jiēdào	125,659	7.45
Yanqing town	延庆镇	Yánqìng Zhèn	125,659	47.00
Kangzhuang town	康庄镇	Kāngzhuāng Zhèn	33,487	75.00
Badaling town	八达岭镇	Bādálǐng Zhèn	8,094	96.00
Yongning town	永宁镇	Yǒngníng Zhèn	24,075	158.70
Jiuxian town	旧县镇	Jiùxiàn Zhèn	19,932	109.70
Zhangshanying town	张山营镇	Zhāngshānyíng Zhèn	23,769	248.00
Sihai town	四海镇	Sìhǎi Zhèn	6,001	115.70
Qianjiadian town	千家店镇	Qiānjiādiàn Zhèn	9,463	371.00
Shenjiaying town	沈家营镇	Shěnjiāyíng Zhèn	12,021	37.30
Dayushu town	大榆树镇	Dàyúshù Zhèn	21,630	64.00
Jingzhuang town	井庄镇	Jǐngzhuāng Zhèn	10,646	125.70
Dazhuangke Township	大庄科乡	Dàzhuāngkē Xiāng	5,276	126.57
Liubinbu Township	刘斌堡乡	Liúbīnbǎo Xiāng	6,088	116.20
Xiangying Township	香营乡	Xiāngyíng Xiāng	7,782	96.00
Zhenzhuquan Township	珍珠泉乡	Zhēnzhūquán Xiāng	3,503	114.00

== Population ==
At the end of 2019, there were 145,474 households in Yanqing District. Among them, 70,386 agricultural households. The registered population is 289,093 people. Among them, 14,045 are female permanent residents. The resident population is 35.7, of which 4.5 are permanent migrants, accounting for 12.6% of the resident population. Among the permanent population, the urban population is 21.3, accounting for 59.7% of the permanent population. The permanent population was born at 8.22‰, and the birth rate was 5.84‰. The natural growth rate of the permanent population was 2.38‰.

== Culture and tourism ==
The district is rich in historical sites and outdoor attractions.

The most visited attraction of Yanqing is Badaling, a restored section of the Great Wall, that is highly popular with tourists. Badaling Remnant (Shixiaguan) and Shuiguan sections of the Great Wall in Yanqing are to the west and east respectively of the highly popular Badaling and receive spillover visitors especially during peak periods.

One of the most popular day-trips for residents of Beijing is the Longqing Gorge located in the village of Gucheng in the district. The scenic area features a canyon filled at the bottom with a reservoir from a nearby man made dam, providing short boat cruises along the dramatic landscape of narrow peaks.

The remnants of a 1,000-year-old cliff dwelling community date back to the Tang dynasty are found at Guyaju Ruins near the village of Dongmenying. Archaeologists are uncertain about the origins of Guyaju. One theory holds that the Kumo Xi, a steppe tribe, carved from the rocks the halls and hundreds of dwellings that form a fortress community in the caves.

Another historical attraction is the town of Yongning. The town square tower was restored in the 2000s and there is a Gothic Revival Catholic church from the 19th century.

Commune by the Great Wall is in the district.

The district's language is roughly divided into six regions, but the boundaries of these six dialect regions are fuzzy and uncertain.

== Scenic spots and historical sites ==
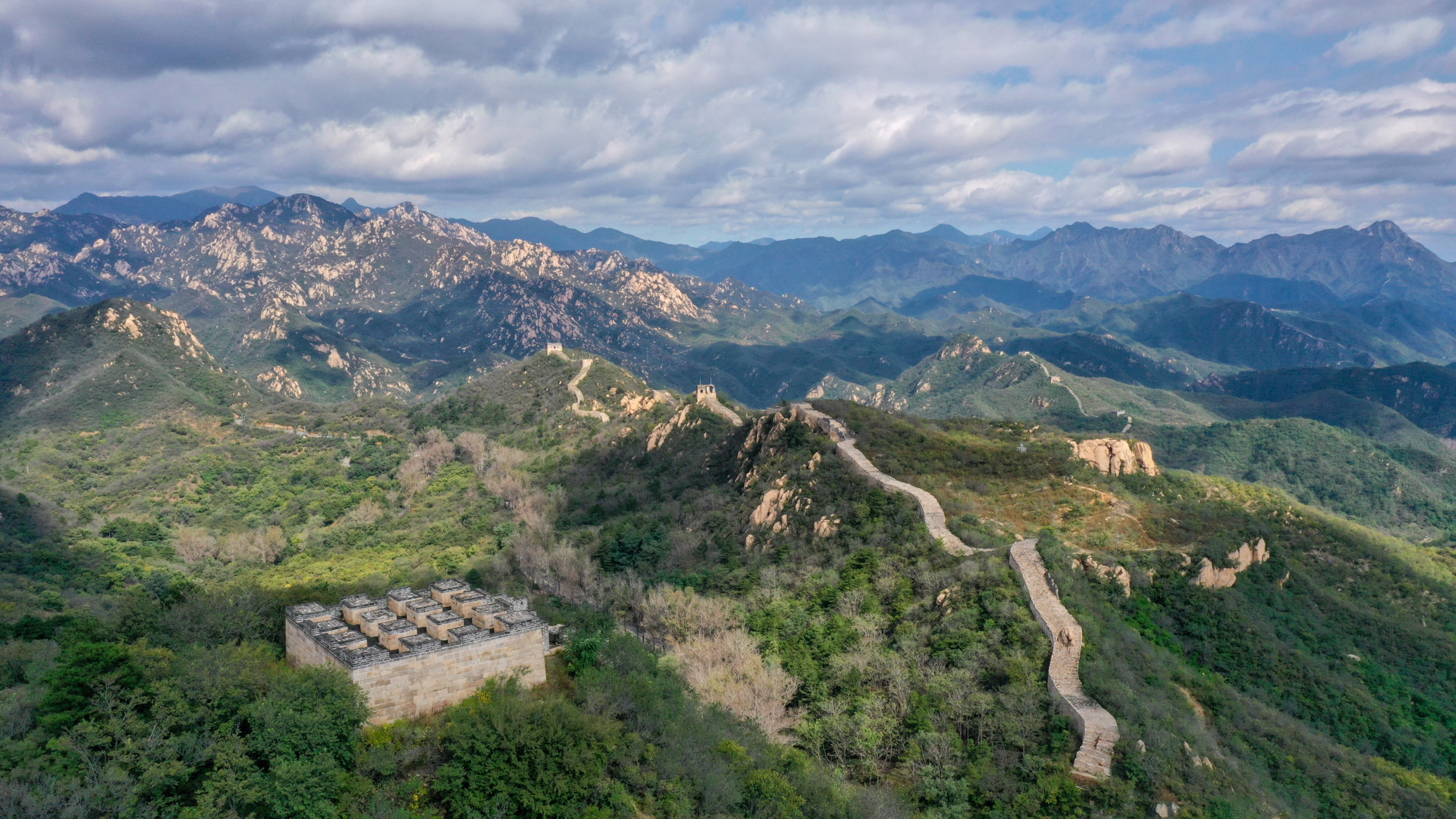
The Great Wall in Dazhuangke Township

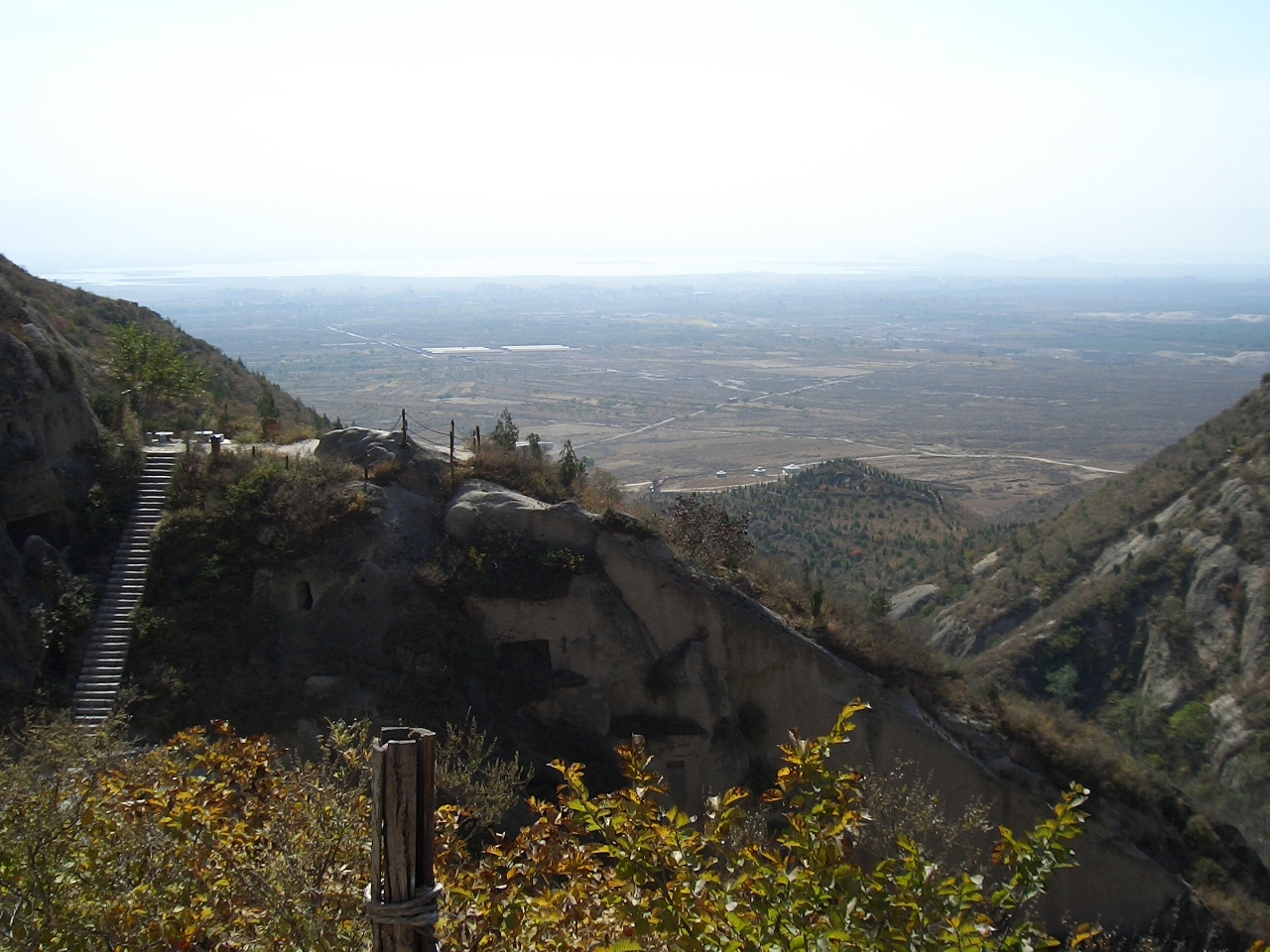
The Yanqing World Geopark, which was included in the UNESCO list of World Geoparks in 2013

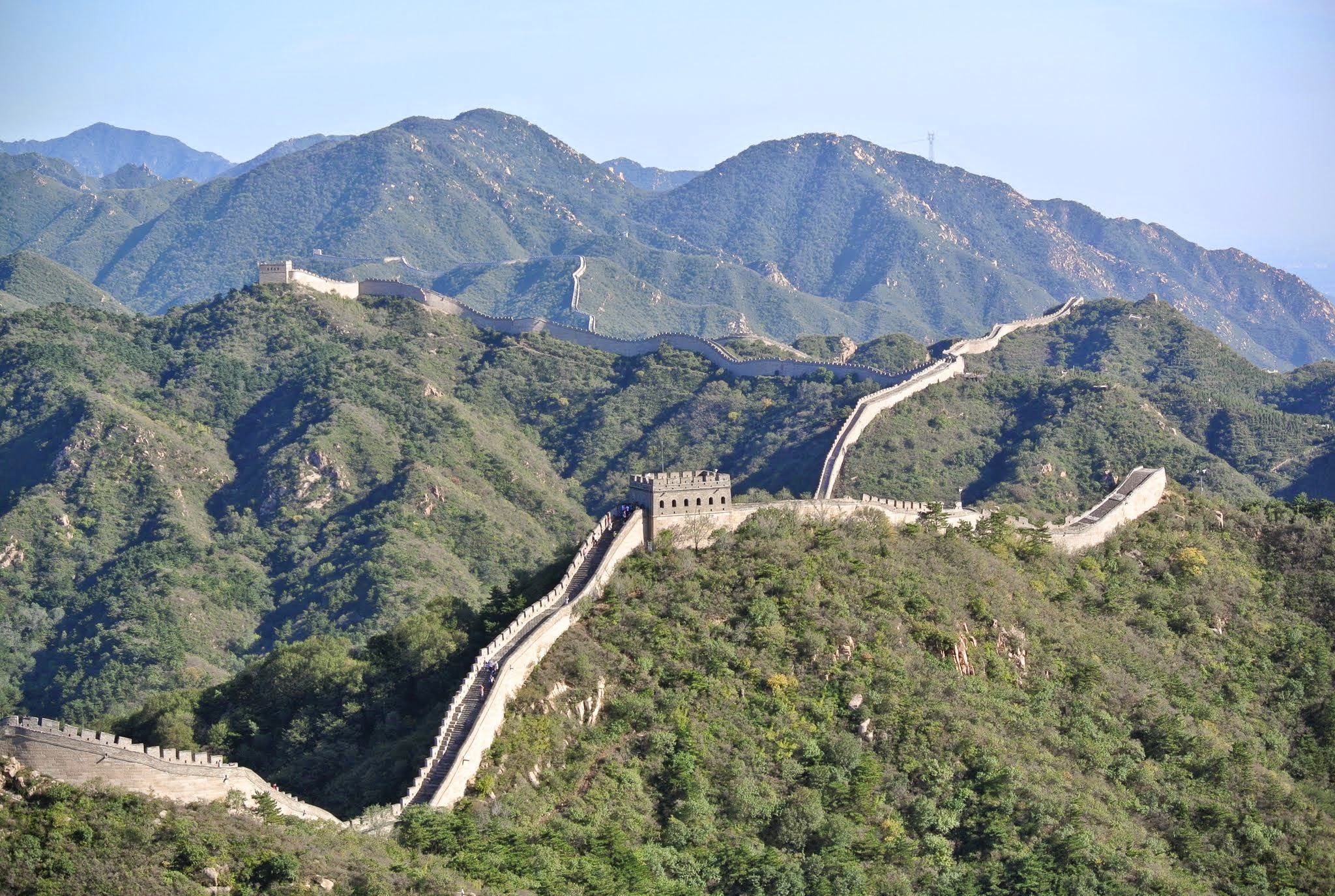
Badaling Great Wall

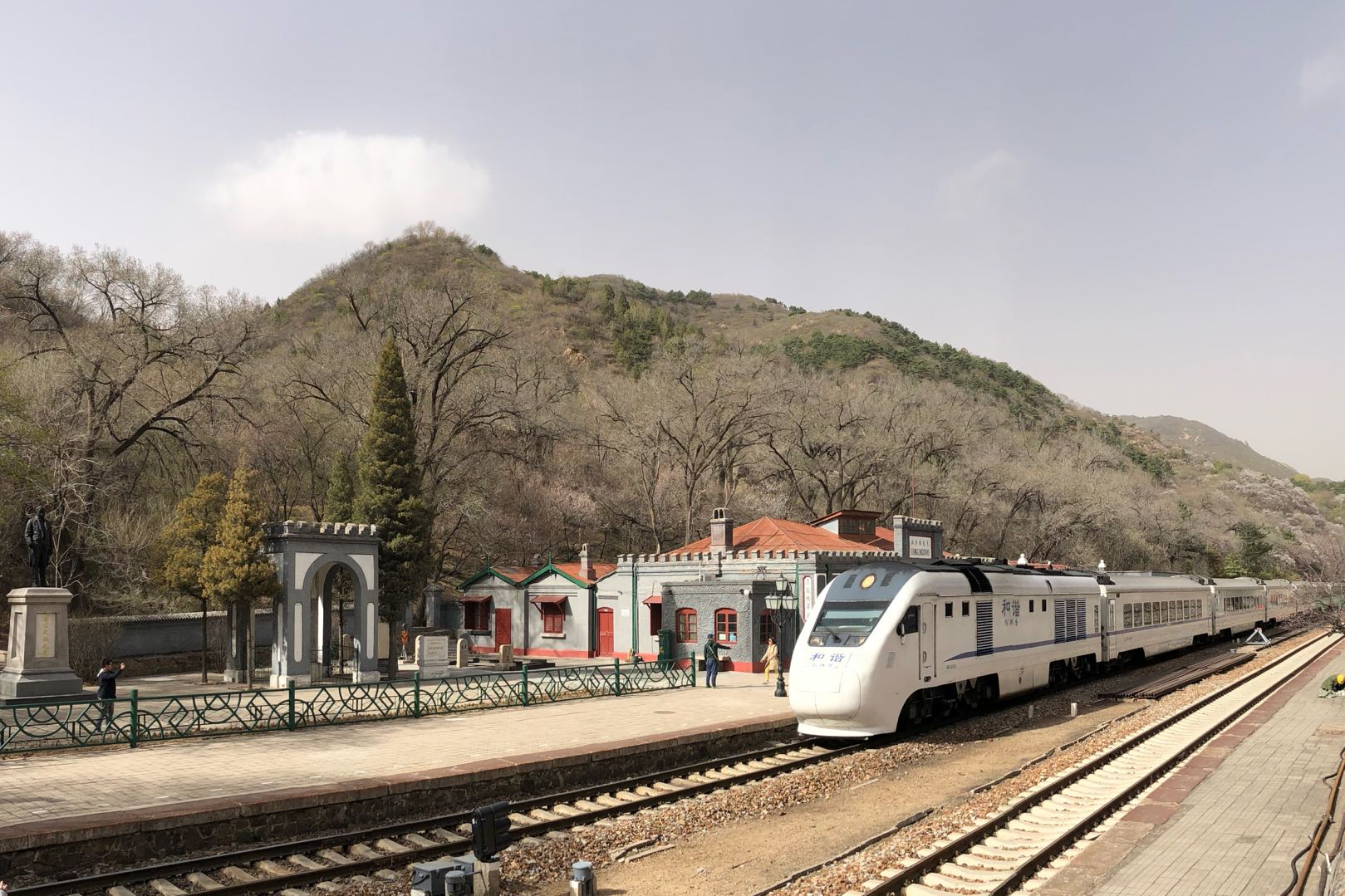
Qinglongqiao railway station

=== Beijing Wild Duck Lake Wetland ===
The Wild Duck Lake Wetland is located in northwest of Yanqing District. It is a national 4A scenic spot and an artificial wetland composed of the Yanqing area of Guanting Reservoir. It is one of the most important bird habitats in Beijing and even North China. In July 1997, the Beijing Wild Duck Lake Wetland was established, and it was a municipal-level nature reserve in December 2000. The total area of the reserve is 6,873 hectares, of which the wetland area is 3939 hectares.

=== Badaling Great Wall ===
The Badaling Great Wall is one of the most famous scenes in Yanqing, which is located at the north entrance of Guan'gou Ancient Road, Jundushan, Yanqing District, Beijing. It is an essential part of the Great Wall of China, a great project in ancient China, and a strait mouth of the Great Wall of the Ming dynasty. The Badaling Great Wall is an essential outpost of Juyong Pass.

=== Longqing Gorge ===
The Longqing Gorge is located in the northwest of Gucheng Village, 85 kilometers away from Beijing City. It is a national 4A scenic spot and one of the sixteen scenic spots in Beijing. The water originates from the eastern foot of Haituo and flows into Gucheng Reservoir through Yudu Mountain. Since Yanqing has a cold winter and a long icing period. Longqing Gorge has used this unique natural condition to hold the Ice Lantern Art Festival since 1987. The Longqing Gorge Ice Lantern Art Exhibition has become a traditional project of winter tourism in the capital.

=== Vanke Shijinglong Ski Resort ===
Named after Vanke, this ski resort was completed in 1999. It is a national 3A scenic spot located in Yanqing, Beijing, 80 kilometers away from downtown Beijing. It is the first ski resort in the surrounding area of Beijing, with the large scale, complete equipment and facilities, and the pioneer in China to adopt artificial snowmaking. It also has a rare southern slope in Beijing, where visitors can ski in the warm sunshine in winter. The snowfield covers an area of 600 acres, and there are six ski trails in the snowfield.

=== Great Wall of China Museum ===
The Great Wal of China Museum, located on the western side of Badaling, is a thematic museum that comprehensively reflects the history and culture of the Badaling Great Wall, and was completed and opened to the public on September 6, 1994. The appearance of the Great Wall Museum of China is a fire beacon building, with a construction area of more than 4,000 square meters and a usable area of 3,200 square meters.

=== Zhan Tianyou Memorial Hall ===
Zhan Tianyou Memorial Hall is located in Badaling Special Zone, Yanqing District, Beijing, China, built to commemorate Chinese railroad engineer Zhan Tianyou, and is subordinate to China Railway Museum, a national third-class museum. In 1992, the museum was awarded as Beijing Patriotic Education Base, and in 1995, the museum was awarded as Railway Patriotic Education Base, and in 1997, the exhibition was renovated, and in 2008, the museum was awarded as Beijing Science Education Base, and the infrastructure and exhibition were completely renovated. The museum was rated as a national third-class museum and an out-of-school activity base for young students in Beijing. in 2010, the museum was rated as a national science popularization education base.

=== Beijing Badaling Wildlife World ===
Beijing Badaling Wildlife World is the largest mountain wildlife park in China, located at the foot of the Badaling Great Wall and close to the Badaling Expressway. The park has five functional areas: wildlife tour area, ecological reserve, mountain forest sightseeing area, ancient culture area, and recreation area. The park covers an area of nearly 6,000 acres, with more than 100 kinds of nearly 10,000 head (only) wild animals.

== Transportation ==
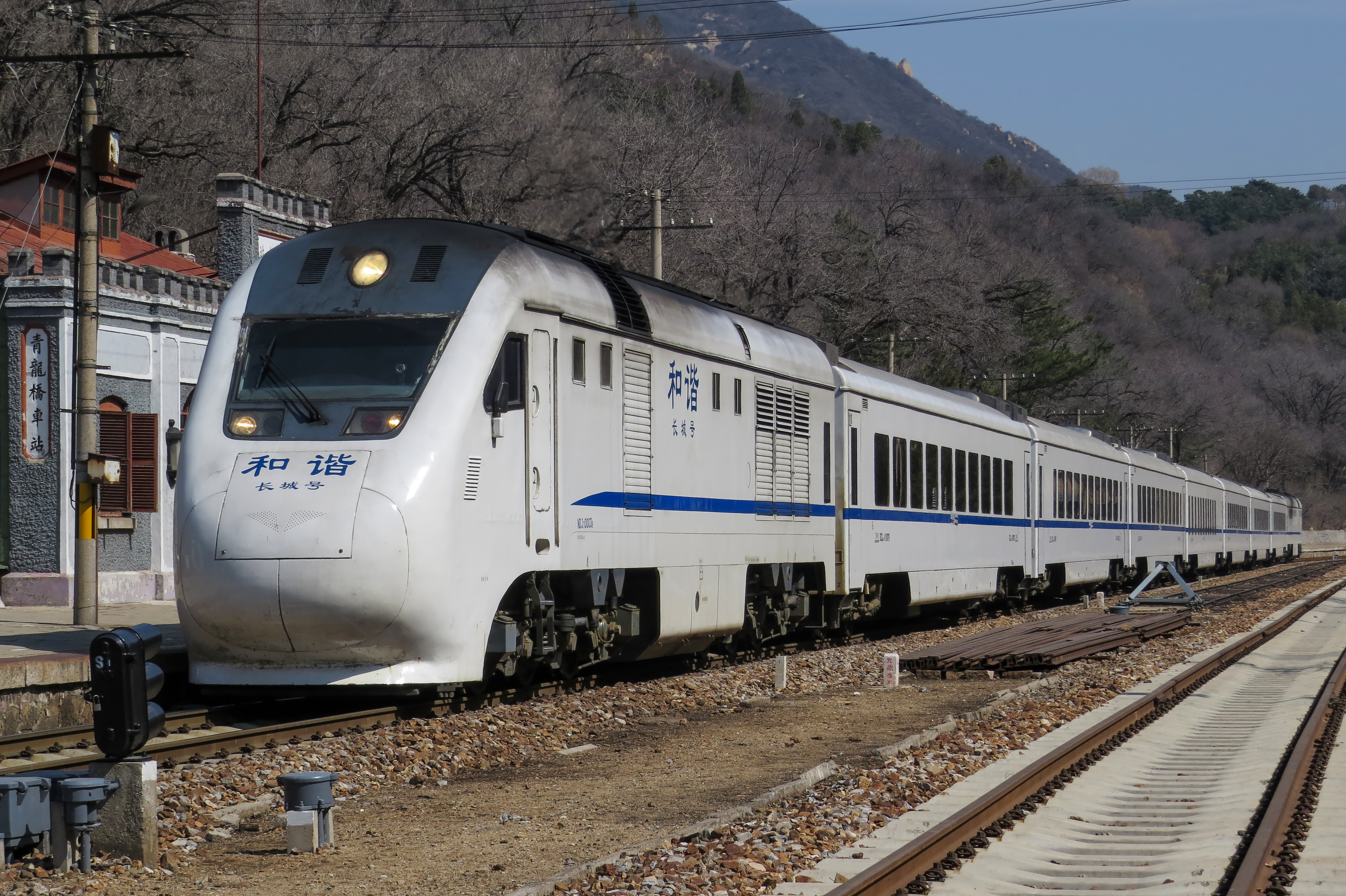
The Line S2 at Qinglongqiao station

Yanqing District is an important transportation hub in the north of Beijing, with urban and rural roads extending in all directions. At the end of 2018, the highway mileage of the whole region reached 1833.4 kilometers, 0.9 kilometers less than the end of the previous year.

The Jingbao Railway, Daqin Railway, Beijing-Tibet (Badaling) Expressway, Jingxin Expressway, China National Highway 110, S216, S323, etc., pass through the district. Construction of the Xingyan Expressway is about to start, and by then, it will take 30 minutes to reach downtown Beijing.

=== Suburban railway ===
The Beijing-Baotou railway and the Line S2 of the suburban railway are convenient for passenger and cargo transportation. The Beijing-Zhangjiakou intercity railway opened its Yanqing branch on December 1, 2020, and it takes 26 minutes to commute to downtown Beijing. Yanqing is served by one commuter railway line operated by Beijing Suburban Railway (BCR). Line S2 (both the main and branch lines) starts from Huangtudian railway station in Changping District and stops at the following stations in Yanqing:

- Line S2 (Main) - Badaling, Yanqing
- Line S2 (Branch) - Badaling, Kangzhuang

== Local food ==
Tofu Banquet

Tofu Banquet is a ceremonial meal in traditional Chinese weddings and celebrations. This food is made by adding cabbage, tofu, preserved pork, vermicelli, etc., into a brazier. The brazier was a heating appliance in the rural areas of northern China in the old days.

=== Yielding fruit ===
Fruits commonly grown in the area include apples, plums, and grapes.
