= Shenjiaying =

Shenjiaying Town 沈家营镇
- Town
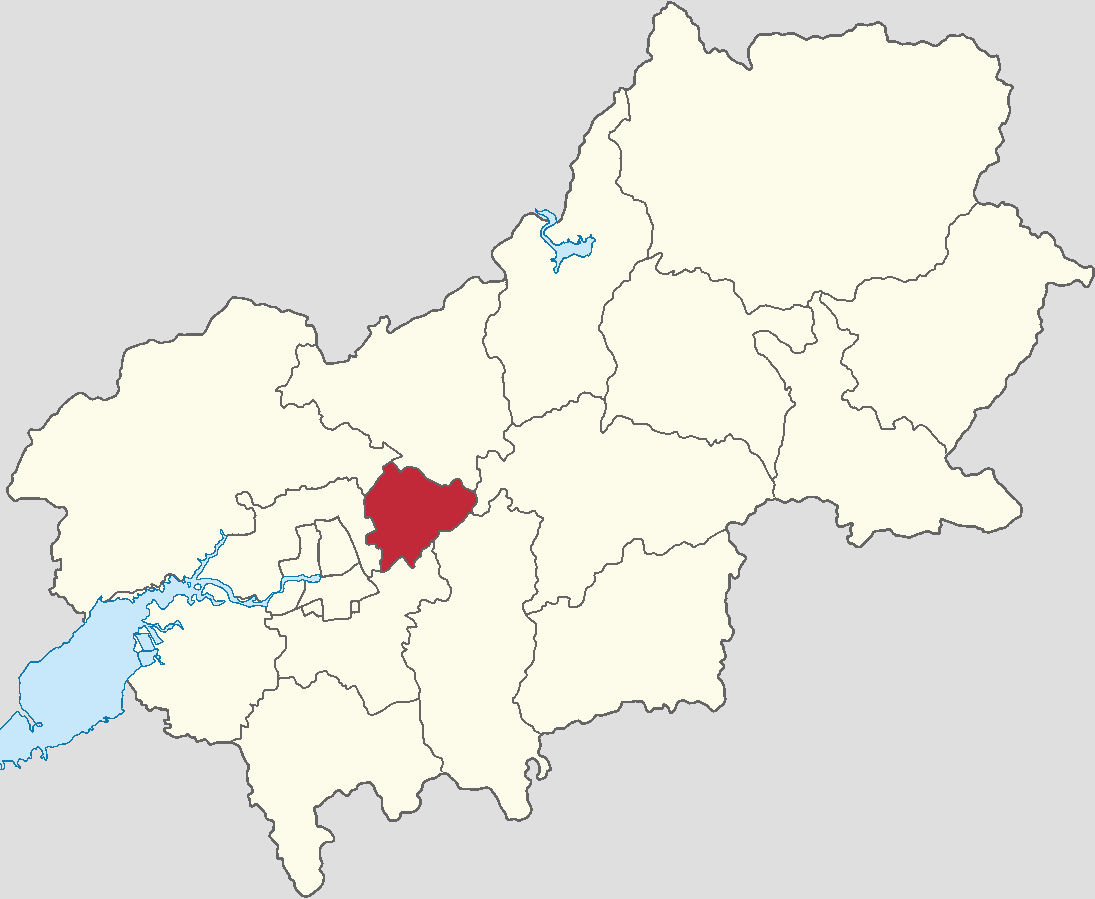
- Location of Yanqing Town within Yanqing District

- Location within Beijing Location within China
- Coordinates: 40°28′49″N 116°02′21″E
- Country: China
- Municipality: Beijing
- District: Yanqing
- Village-level Divisions: 3 communities 22 villages

Area
  - Total: 30.39 km^{2} (11.73 sq mi)
- Elevation: 500 m (1,600 ft)

Population (2020)
  - Total: 16,661
  - Density: 548.2/km^{2} (1,420/sq mi)
- Time zone: UTC+8 (China Standard)
- Postal code: 102104
- Area code: 010

Shenjiaying Town (simplified Chinese: 沈家营镇; traditional Chinese: 沈家營鎮; pinyin: Shěnjiāyíng Zhèn) is a town in the Yanqing District of Beijing. It shares border with Zhangshanying and Jiuxian Towns in the north, Yongning Town in the east, Jingzhuang and Dayushu Towns in the south, and Yanqing Town in the west. In 2020, it was home to 16,661.

This town's name refers to Shenjiaying Village, where the town's government is located.

== Geography ==
Shenjiaying Town is on Guishui River's alluvial plain, within the Yanhuai Basin. Both Beijing-Yinchuan Highway and Datong–Qinhuangdao railway go through the town.

== History ==
Timetable of Shenjiaying Town
Year	Status	Part of
1949 - 1952	2nd District	Yanqing County, Chahar
1952 - 1953	2nd District	Yanqing County, Hebei
1953 - 1956	Wangquanying Township Suzhuang Township	Yanqing County, Hebei
1956 - 1958	Part of Yanqing Town	Yanqing County, Hebei
1958 - 1961	Shenjiaying Production Team, within Dengta People's Commune	Yanqing County, Beijing
1961 - 1983	Shenjiaying People's Commune	Yanqing County, Beijing
1983 - 2000	Shenjiaying Township	Yanqing County, Beijing
2000 - 2015	Shenjiaying Town	Yanqing County, Beijing
2015–present	Shenjiaying Town	Yanqing District, Beijing

== Administrative divisions ==
As of 2021, Shenjiaying Town had direct jurisdiction over 25 subdivisions, consisted of 3 communities and 22 villages. They are listed as follows:

Subdivision names	Name transliterations	Type
沈家营镇	Shenjiayingzhen	Community
天成家园北	Tiancheng Jiayuan Bei	Community
天成家园南	Tiancheng Jiayuan Nan	Community
沈家营	Shenjiaying	Village
东王化营	Dong Wanghuaying	Village
冯庄	Fengzhuang	Village
新合营	Xinheying	Village
曹官营	Caoguanying	Village
临河	Linhe	Village
香村营	Xiangcunying	Village
北老君堂	Bei Laojuntang	Village
兴安堡	Xing'anpu	Village
魏家营	Weijiaying	Village
连家营	Lianjiaying	Village
前吕庄	Qian Lüzhuang	Village
后吕庄	Hou Lüzhuang	Village
马匹营	Mapiying	Village
孙庄	Sunzhuang	Village
下郝庄	Xiahaozhuang	Village
北梁	Beiliang	Village
八里店	Balidian	Village
西王化营	Xi Wanghuaying	Village
河东	Hedong	Village
下花园	Xia Huayuan	Village
上花园	Shang Huayuan	Village

== See also ==
- List of township-level divisions of Beijing
