= Sihai, Beijing =

Sihai Town 四海镇
- Town
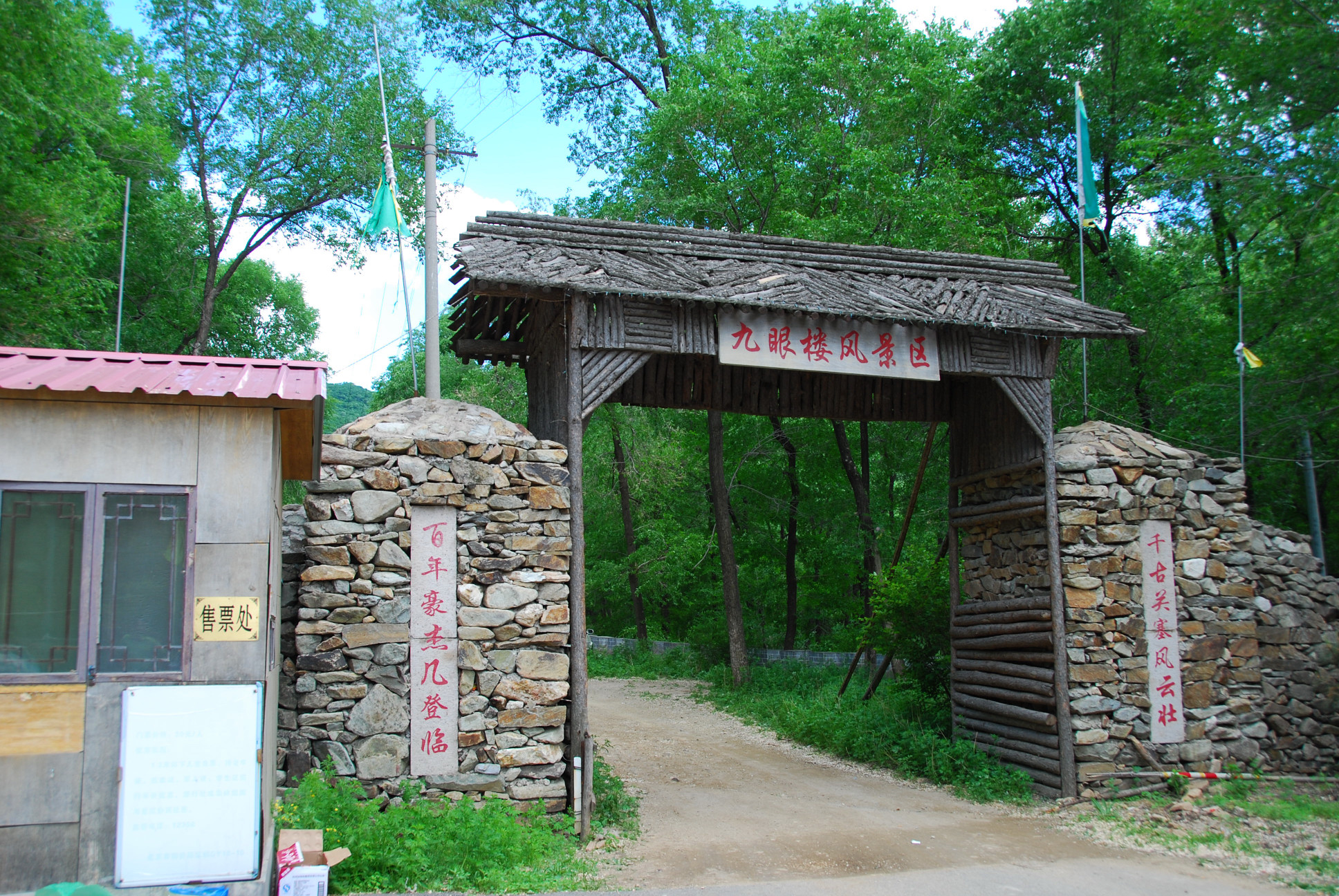
- Jiuyanlou near Shiyao Village, 2009

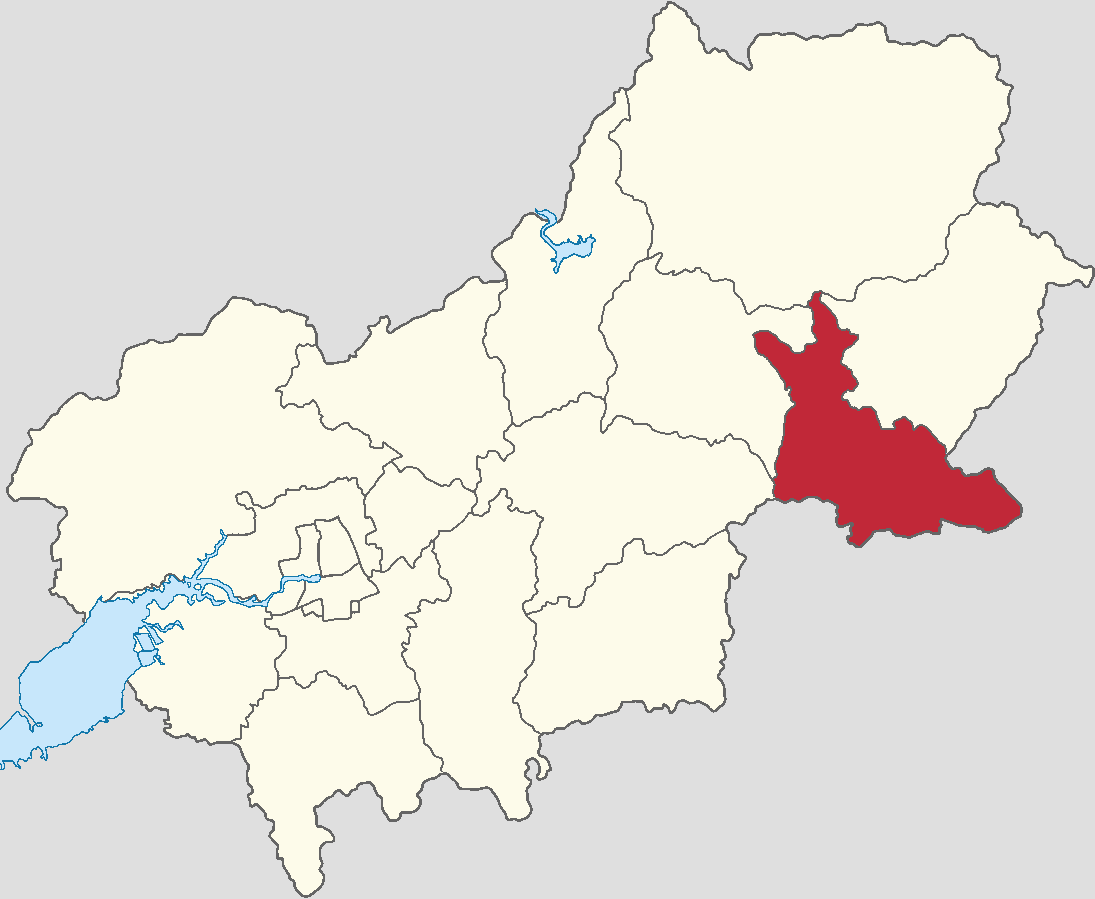
- Location in Yanqing District

- Location within Beijing Location within China
- Coordinates: 40°31′48″N 116°24′25″E
- Country: China
- Municipality: Beijing
- District: Yanqing
- Village-level Divisions: 1 community 18 villages

Area
  - Total: 115.8 km^{2} (44.7 sq mi)
- Elevation: 656 m (2,152 ft)

Population (2020)
  - Total: 4,343
  - Density: 37.50/km^{2} (97.14/sq mi)
- Time zone: UTC+8 (China Standard)
- Postal code: 102107
- Area code: 010

Sihai Town (simplified Chinese: 四海镇; traditional Chinese: 四海鎮; pinyin: Sìhǎi Zhèn) is a town in the Yanqing District of Beijing. It borders Qianjiadian Town and Zhenzhuquan Township in the north, Liulimiao and Yanqi Towns in the east, Bohai and Jiuduhe Towns in the south, as well as Yongning Town and Liubinbao Townships in the west. Its population was 4,434 as of 2020.

This region hosted a major smelter during the Yuan dynasty. With more workers immigrated here from all over China, the region was named Sihai (Chinese: 四海; lit. 'Four Seas') in the sense of "People come here from all four seas/all over the world."

== Geography ==
Sihai Town sits in a basin within Yan Mountain Range, with the Caishi River flowing through it.

== History ==
Timetable of Sihai Town
Time	Status	Under
Ming dynasty	Sihai Fort	
Qing dynasty		Sihai County, Zhili
1912 - 1951		Sihai County, Hebei
1951 - 1952		Yanqing County, Chahar
1952 - 1956		Yanqing County, Hebei
1956 - 1958	Sihai Township	Yanqing County, Hebei
1958 - 1983	Sihai People's Commune	Yanqing County, Beijing
1983 - 1995	Sihai Township	Yanqing County, Beijing
1995 - 2015	Sihai Town (Incorporated Heihanling Township in 1997)	Yanqing County, Beijing
2015–present	Sihai Town (Incorporated Heihanling Township in 1997)	Yanqing District, Beijing

== Administrative divisions ==
As of the year 2021, 19 subdivisions, more specifically 1 community and 18 villages, constituted Sihai Town, They can be seen in the following table:

Subdivision names	Name transliterations	Type
四海镇	Sihaizhen	Community
西沟里	Xigou Li	Village
西沟外	Xigou Wai	Village
四海	Sihai	Village
椴木沟	Duanmugou	Village
菜食河	Caishihe	Village
海字口	Haizikou	Village
岔石口	Chashikou	Village
永安堡	Yong'anpu	Village
郭家湾	Guojiawan	Village
石窑	Shiyao	Village
大胜岭	Dashengling	Village
南湾	Nanwan	Village
黑汉岭	Heihanling	Village
大吉祥	Dajixiang	Village
上花楼	Shanghualou	Village
王顺沟	Wangshungou	Village
前山	Qianshan	Village
楼梁	Louliang	Village

== See also ==
- List of township-level divisions of Beijing
