= Qianjiadian =

Qianjiadian Town 千家店镇
- Town
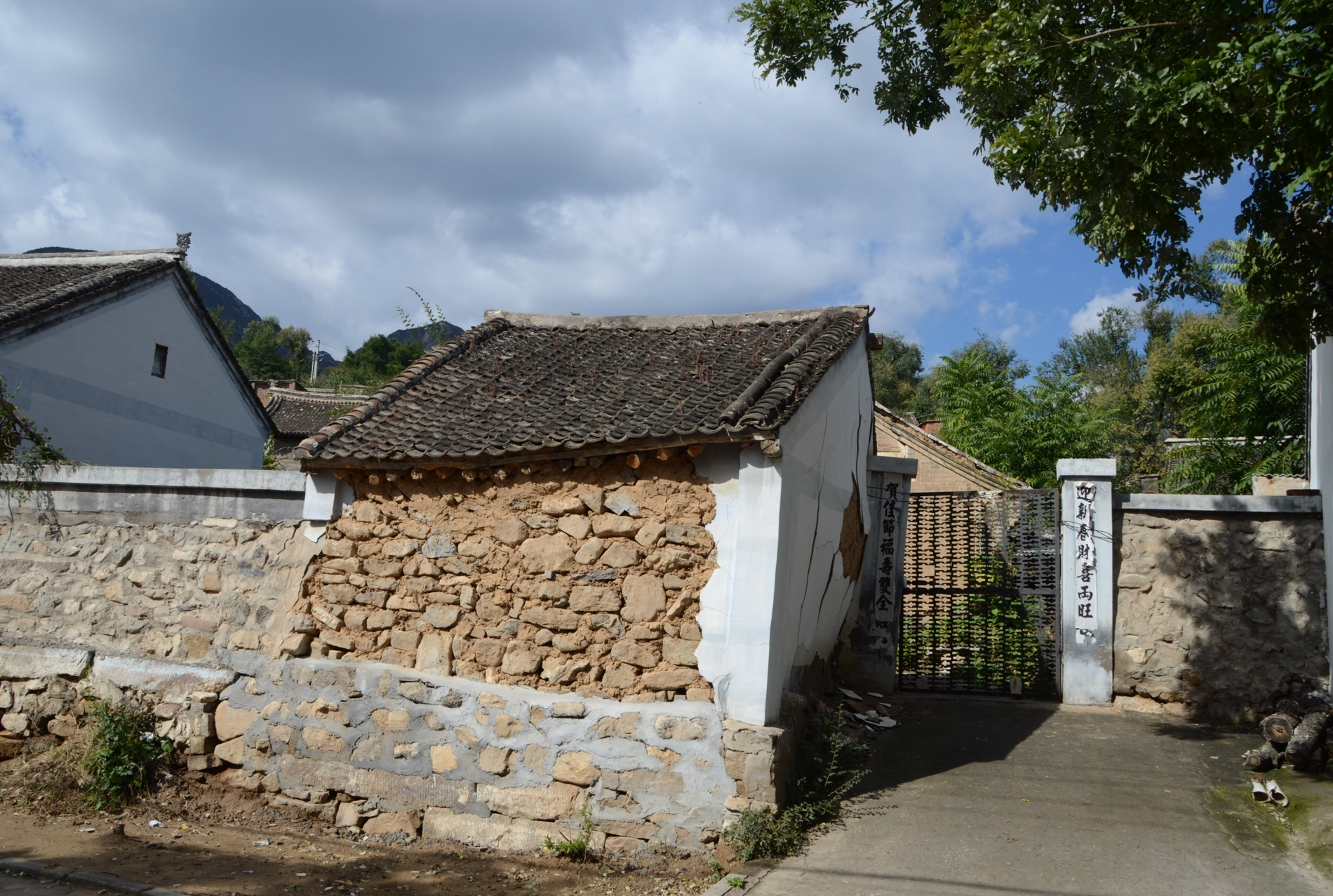
- Huapen Village within the town, 2014

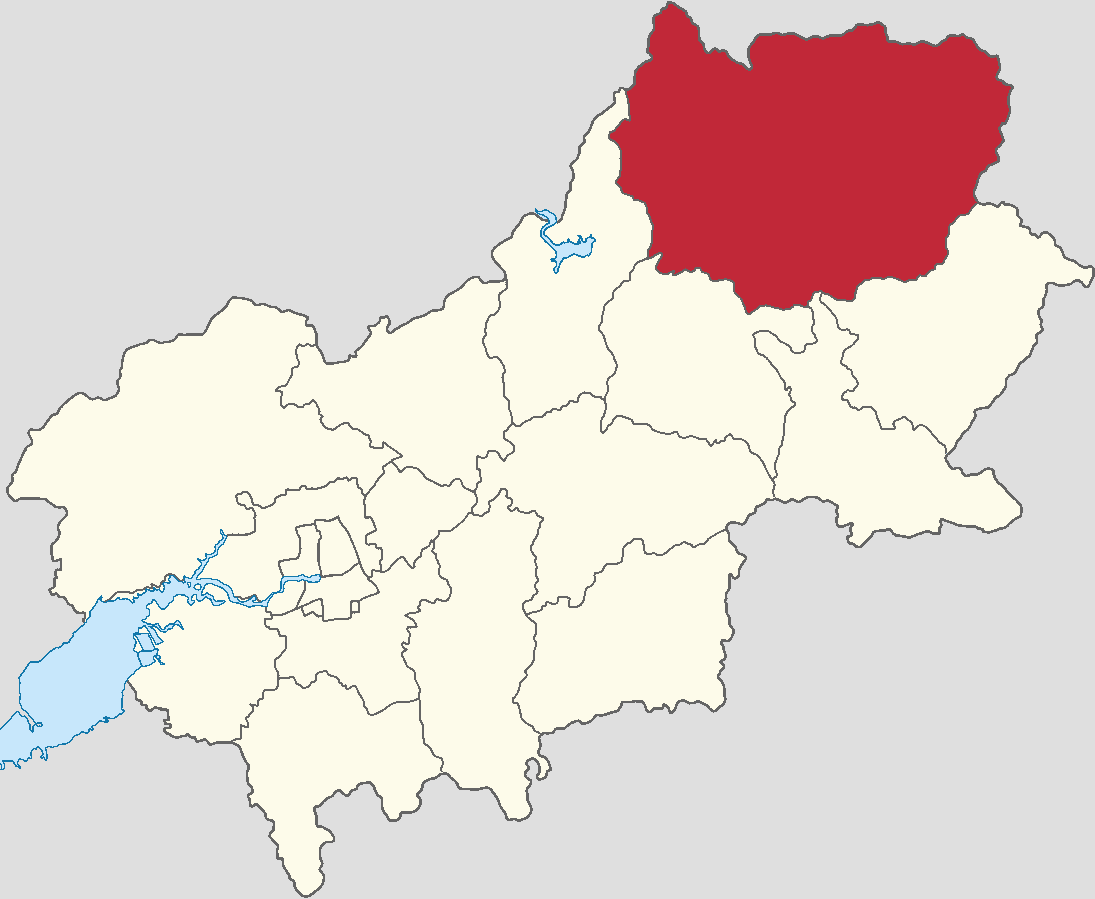
- Location within Yanqing District

- Location within Beijing Location within China
- Coordinates: 40°41′32″N 116°20′25″E
- Country: China
- Municipality: Beijing
- District: Yanqing
- Village-level Divisions: 1 community 19 villages

Area
  - Total: 367.8 km^{2} (142.0 sq mi)
- Elevation: 449 m (1,473 ft)

Population (2020)
  - Total: 6,273
  - Density: 17.06/km^{2} (44.17/sq mi)
- Time zone: UTC+8 (China Standard)
- Postal code: 102108
- Area code: 010

Qianjiadian Town (simplified Chinese: 千家店镇; traditional Chinese: 千家店鎮; pinyin: Qiānjiādiàn Zhèn) is a town in the Yanqing District of Beijing. It shares border with Dongmao Town to the north, Baoshan Town and Zhenzhuquan Township to the east, Sihai Town and Liubinbao Township to the south, and Xiangying Township to the west. Its population was 6,273 as of 2020.

== Geography ==
Qianjiadian Town is located within a basin of the Yan Mountain Range, with Hei River flowing through its north and Bai River flowing through its south. It is connected to Luanchi and Liusha Roads.

== History ==
History of Qianjiadian Town
Time	Status	Within
Qing dynasty		Yanqing Department
1914 - 1940		Guyuan County
1940 - 1947		Fengluanmi United County
1947 - 1951		Sihai County
1951 - 1956		Chicheng County, Hebei
1956 - 1958	Hongshiwan Township	Yanqing County, Hebei
1958 - 1983	Qianjiadian People's Commune	Yanqing County, Beijing
1983 - 1995	Qianjiadian Township	Yanqing County, Beijing
1995 - 2015	Qianjiadian Town (Huapen, Shaliangzi and Hongqidian Villages joined in 1997)	Yanqing County, Beijing
2015–present	Qianjiadian Town (Huapen, Shaliangzi and Hongqidian Villages joined in 1997)	Yanqing District, Beijing

== Administrative divisions ==
In 2021, Qianajiadian Town covered 20 subdivisions, with the following 1 community and 19 villages:

Subdivision names	Name transliterations	Type
千家店镇	Qianjiadianzhen	Community
河口	Hekou	Village
石槽	Shicao	Village
红石湾	Hongshiwan	Village
千家店	Qianjiadian	Village
河南	Henan	Village
下德龙湾	Xiadelongwan	Village
水头	Shuitou	Village
大石窑	Dashiyao	Village
红旗甸	Hongqidian	Village
六道河	Liudaohe	Village
大栜树	Daseshu	Village
沙梁子	Shaliangzi	Village
四潭沟	Sitangou	Village
下湾	Xiawan	Village
菜木沟	Caimugou	Village
牤牛沟	Mangniugou	Village
水泉沟	Shuiquangou	Village
花盆	Huapen	Village
平台子	Pingtaizi	Village

== Gallery ==
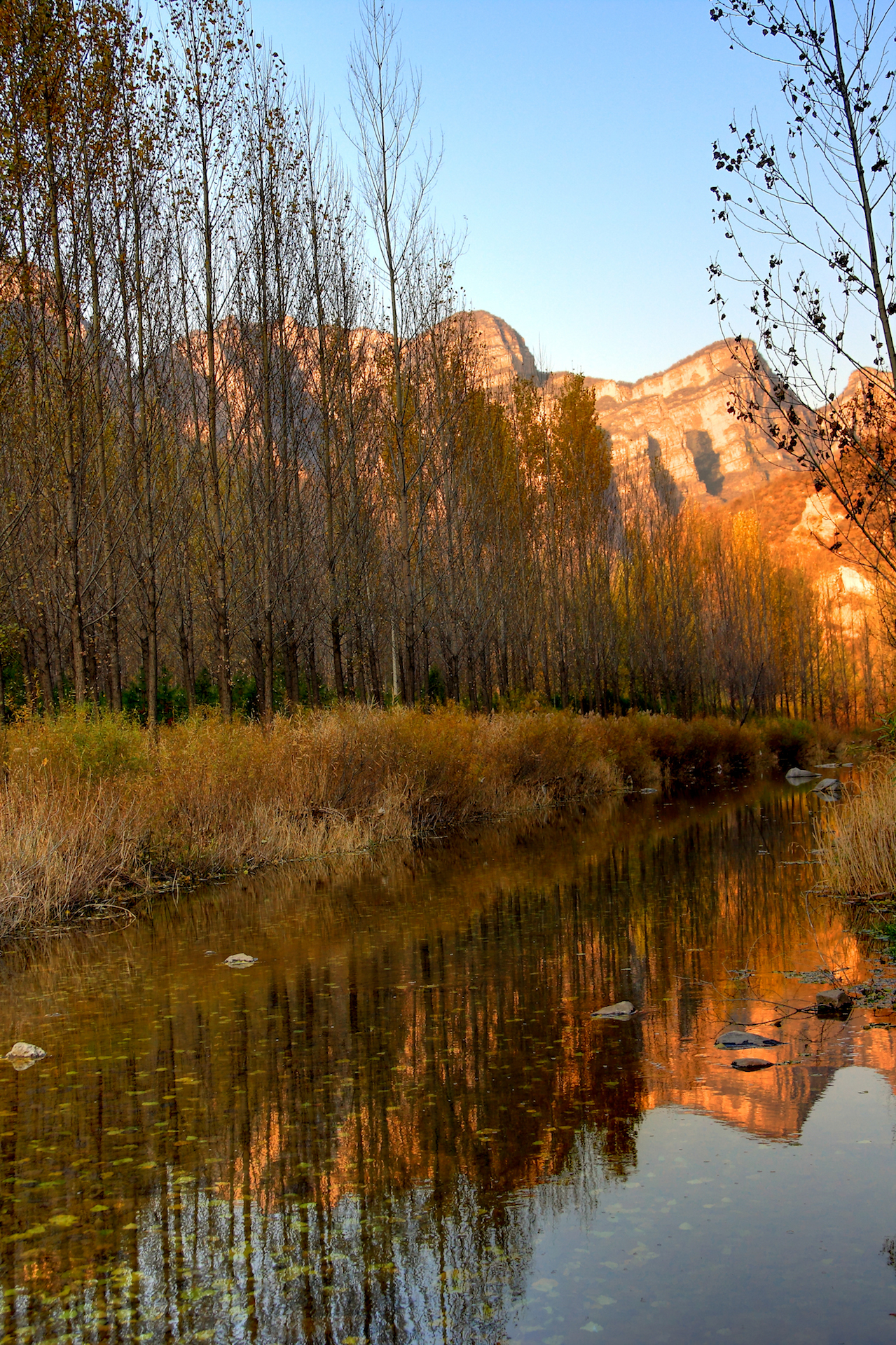
Bai River near Liudaohe Village, 2013

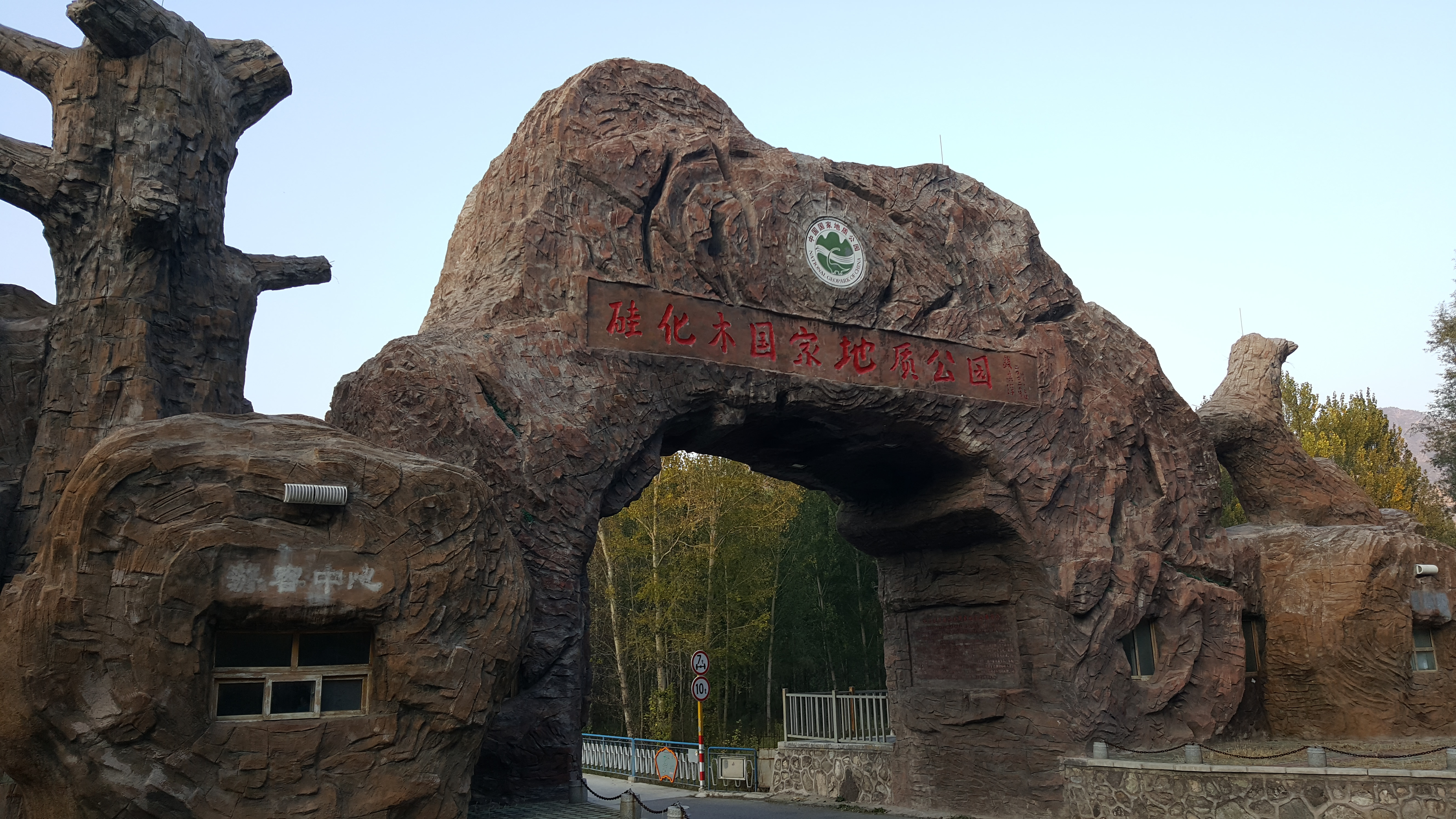
Yanqing Petrified Wood Geology Park, 2017

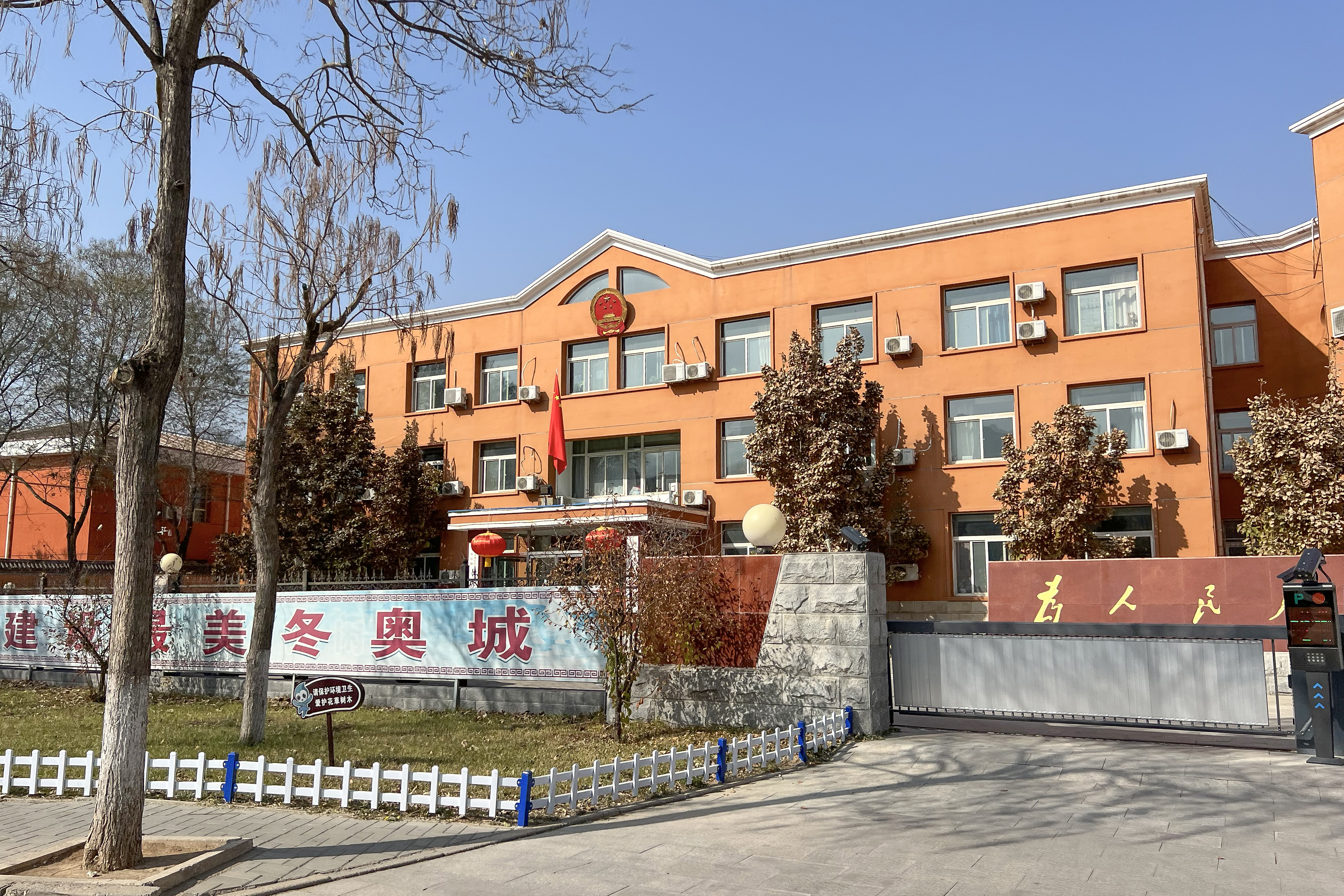
Government of Qianjiadian Town, 2022

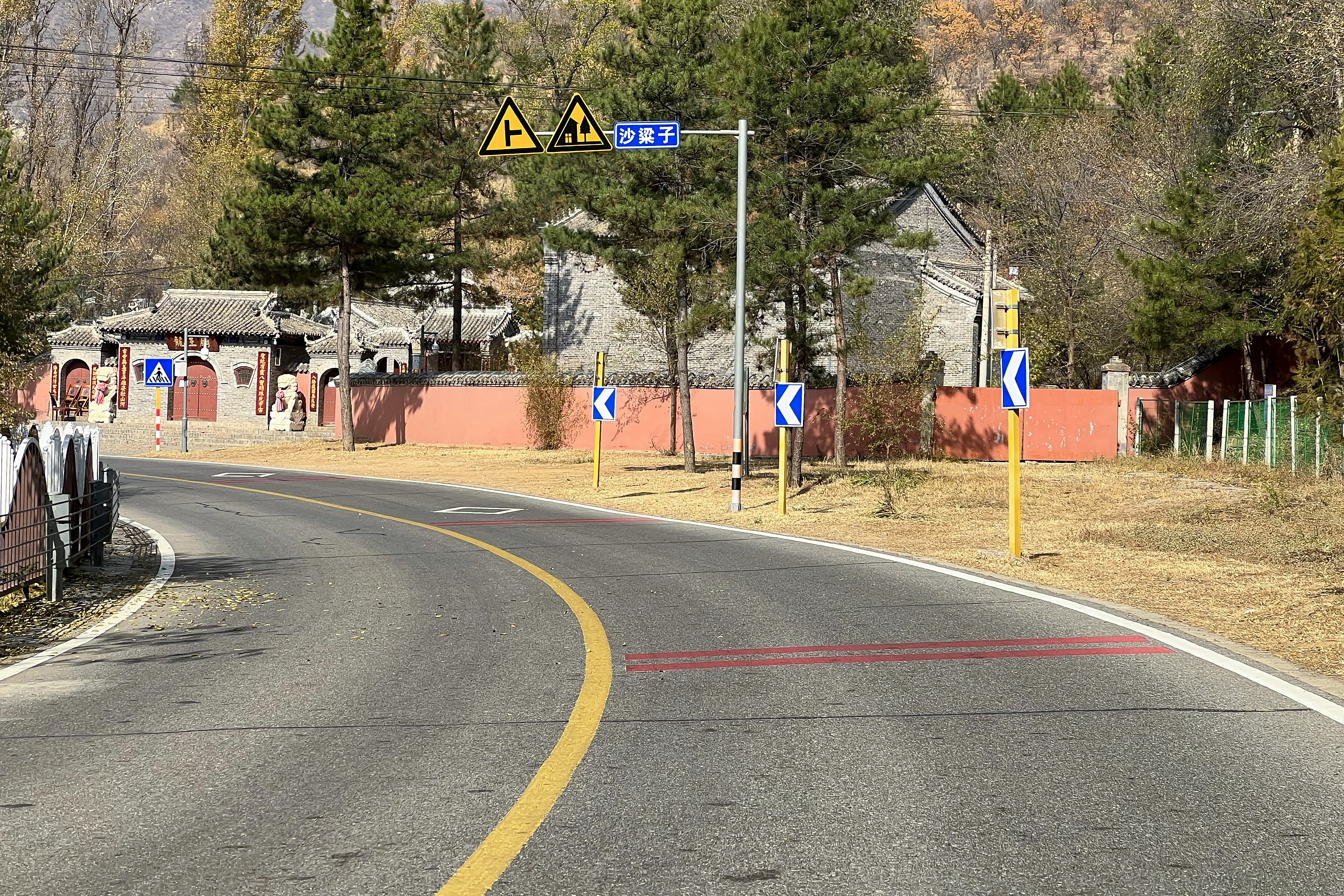
Qianxiao Highway south of Shaliangzi, 2022

== See also ==
- List of township-level divisions of Beijing
