= List of tunnels in China =

This list of tunnels in China includes any road, rail or waterway tunnel in China.

== Beijing ==
- Xiaoyue Tunnel

== Chongqing ==
- Baiyun Tunnel (cross-mountain) (road)

== Gansu ==
- Wushaoling Tunnel

== Hainan ==
- Qiaozhong Road Tunnel
- Wenming East Road Tunnel, crossing under the Nandu River, this is Hainan's first river-crossing tunnel.

== Hong Kong ==
- Aberdeen Tunnel (cross-mountain) (road)
- Airport Express / Tung Chung line (underwater) (metro)
- Beacon Hill Tunnel (cross-mountain) (rail/metro)
- Cheung Tsing Tunnel (cross-mountain) (road)
- Cross-Harbour Tunnel (underwater) (road)
- Eagle's Nest Tunnel (cross-mountain) (road)
- Eastern Harbour Crossing / Tseung Kwan O line (underwater) (road and metro)
- Kai Tak Tunnel (beneath site of former Hong Kong International Airport) (road)
- Lion Rock Tunnel (cross-mountain) (road and water pipe)
- Sha Tin Heights Tunnel (cross-mountain) (road)
- Shing Mun Tunnels (cross-mountain) (road)
- Tai Lam Tunnel (cross-mountain) (road)
- Tate's Cairn Tunnel (cross-mountain) (road)
- Tsuen Wan line (underwater) (metro)
- Western Harbour Crossing (underwater) (road)

== Shaanxi ==
- Zhongnanshan Tunnel

== Shandong ==
- Qing-Huang Tunnel

== Shanghai ==
- A20 (Outer Ring Road) Tunnel
- Bund Passage
- Bund Sightseeing Tunnel
- Dalian Road Tunnel
- Dapu Road Tunnel
- Fuxing East Road Tunnel
- Shanghai Metro Tunnels, including 6 crossings of the Huangpu River as of 2010
- Shanghai Yangtze River Tunnel and Bridge
- Xiangyan Road Tunnel
- Yan'an East Road Tunnel
- Yangpu Road Tunnel

== Sichuan ==
- Mount Erlang Tunnel

== Tibet ==
- Fenghuoshan tunnel
- Yangbajing tunnel

== See also ==
- List of long railway tunnels in China
- List of tunnels by location
- Yangtze River bridges and tunnels
