= Beijing–Datong Expressway =

Expressway in mainland China

京大高速公路

Route information
- Length: 334 km (208 mi)
- Existed: 2002–present

Major junctions
- From: Beijing
- To: Datong

Location
- Country: China

Highway system
- Transport in China

The Jingda Expressway (Chinese: 京大高速公路; pinyin: Jīngdà Gāosùgōnglù) is an expressway in the People's Republic of China, starting from Beijing and ending in Datong, in Shanxi province. It was the first highway constructed and managed completely based on a market-oriented operation, being completed in full on 16 November 2002.

The Jingda Expressway is formed mainly by the main trunk route from Beijing to Datong in three stages. Leaving Beijing, the Jingda Expressway becomes the Badaling Expressway. After Kangzhuang in Yanqing County, it becomes the Jingzhang Expressway. Finally, it becomes the Xuanda Expressway.

As of September 2004, traffic has been clogging up more and more in the area. Due to the massive transportation of coal, what was a very smooth route in the summer is now clogged up with immense traffic jams.

== Specific Information ==
- For the beginning section in Beijing through to Kangzhuang, see Badaling Expressway.
- For the section from Kangzhuang, Beijing through to Xuanhua, Hebei, see Jingzhang Expressway.
- For the section from Xuanhua through to Datong, Shanxi, see Xuanda Expressway.

== See also ==
- China National Highways
- Expressways of Beijing
- Expressways of China
