= Yanqing (town) =

Yanqing Town 延庆镇
- Town
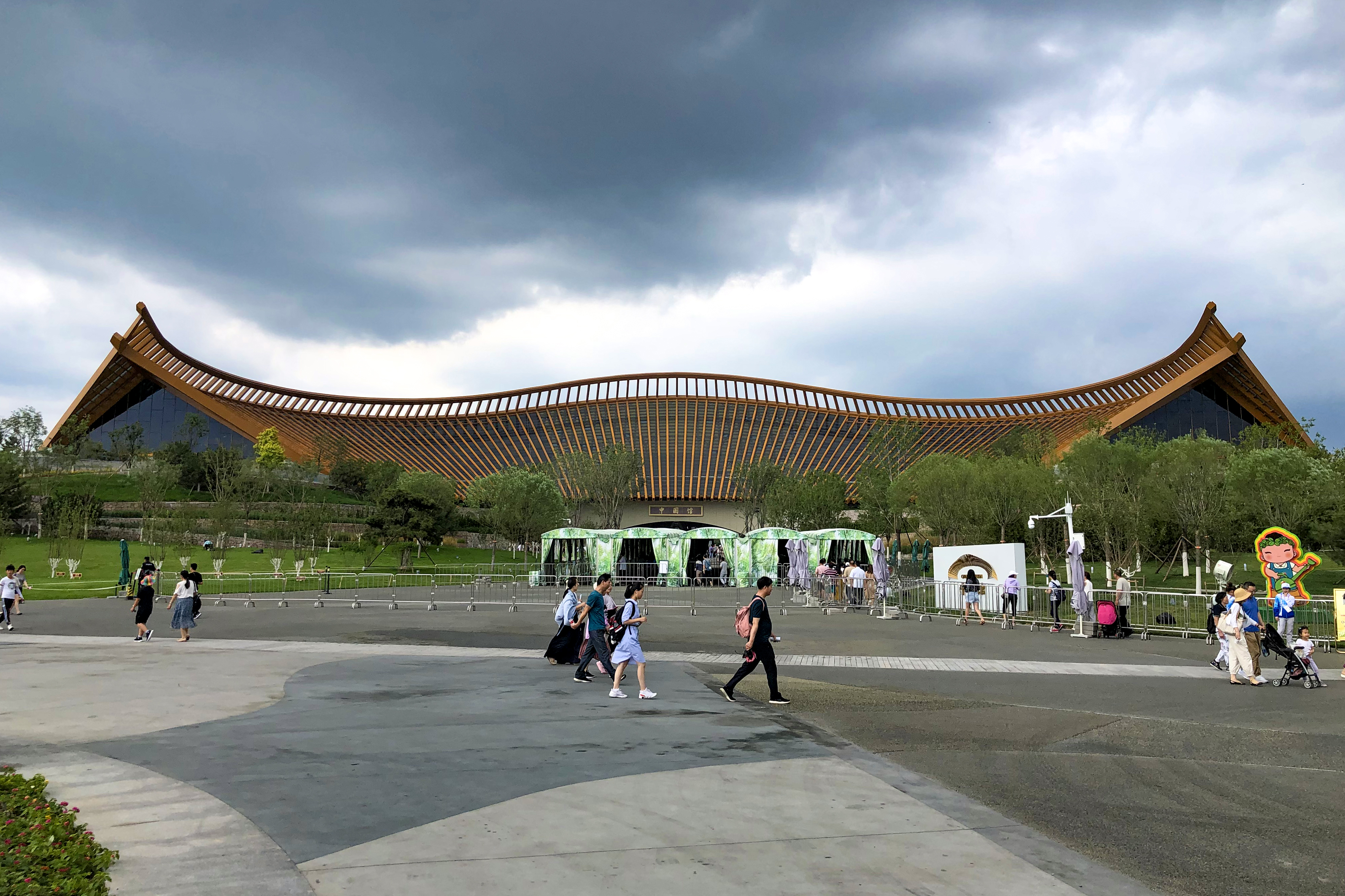
- China Pavilion of the Expo 2019

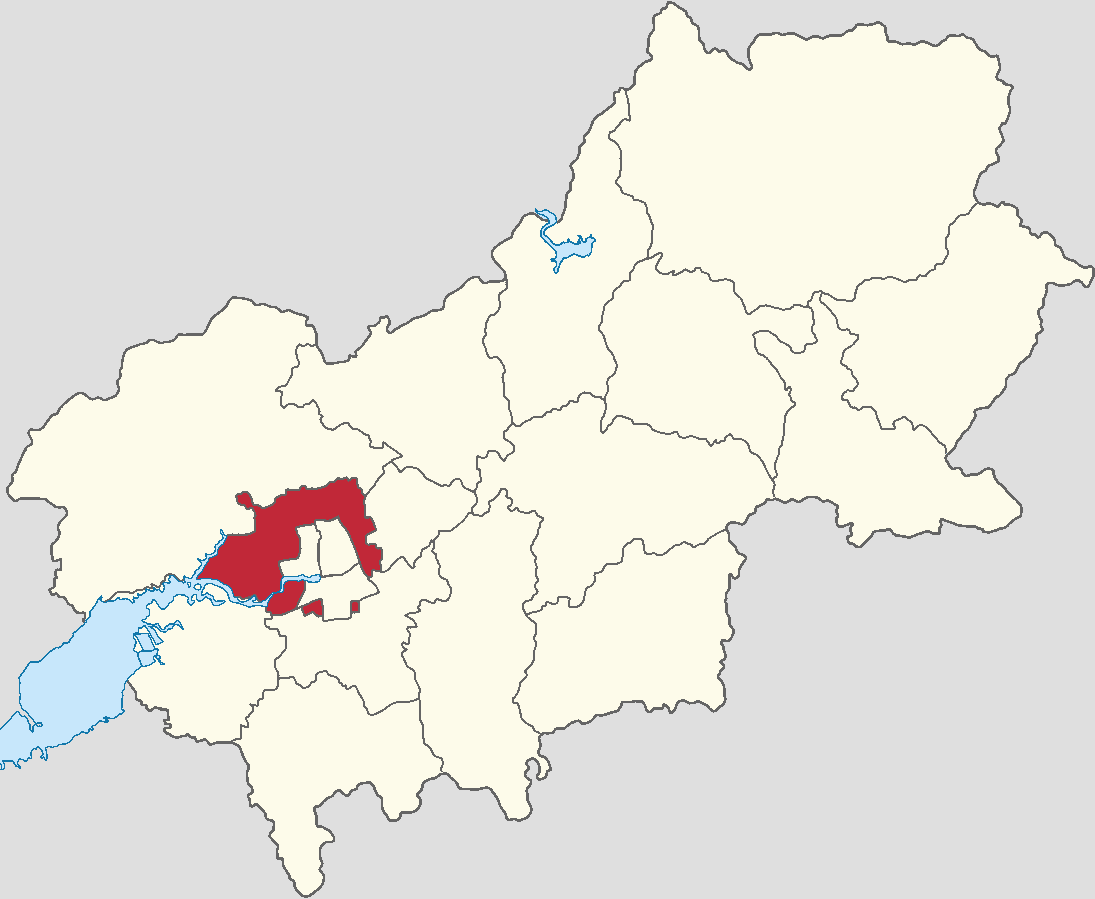
- Location of Yanqing Town in Yanqing District

- Location within Beijing Location within China
- Coordinates: 40°27′35″N 115°58′17″E
- Country: China
- Municipality: Beijing
- District: Yanqing
- Village-level Divisions: 45 villages

Area
  - Total: 61.79 km^{2} (23.86 sq mi)
- Elevation: 496 m (1,627 ft)

Population (2020)
  - Total: 54,790
  - Density: 886.7/km^{2} (2,297/sq mi)
- Time zone: UTC+8 (China Standard)
- Postal code: 102100
- Area code: 010

Yanqing Town (simplified Chinese: 延庆镇; traditional Chinese: 延慶鎮; pinyin: Yánqìng Zhèn) is a town situated on the west side of Yanqing District, Beijing, China. It borders Zhangshanying Town in its north, Shenjiaying Town in its east, as well as Dayushu and Kangzhuang Towns in its south. Additionally, it contains Rulin, Xiangshuiyuan and Baiquan Subdistricts within it, and has two exclaves south of Baiquan. In 2020, Its population was determined to be 54,790.

The town's name had been Longqing (Chinese: 隆庆; lit. 'Magnificent Celebration') during the early Ming dynasty. In 1567, to avoid the name taboo of Longqing Emperor, the region was renamed Yanqing (Chinese: 延庆; lit. 'Extended Celebration').

== Geography ==
Yanqing Town is situated at the both shores of Guishui River. China National Highway 110 and Datong–Qinhuangdao railway both traverse through the town.

== History ==
Timeline of Yanqing Town
Year	Status	Belong to
1949 - 1952	Yanqing Town	Yanqing County, Chahar
1952 - 1953	Yanqing Town	Yanqning County, Zhangjiakou, Hebei
1953 - 1958	1st District	Yanqning County, Zhangjiakou, Hebei
1958 - 1978	Chengguan Production Team, under Dengta People's Commune	Yanqing County, Beijing
1978 - 1990	Yanqing People's Commune	Yanqing County, Beijing
1990 - 2015	Yanqing Town (3 region were carved out and made into subdistricts in 2009)	Yanqing County, Beijing
2015–present	Yanqing Town (3 region were carved out and made into subdistricts in 2009)	Yanqing District, Beijing

== Administrative divisions ==
At the end of 2021, Yanqing Town was made up of the following 45 villages:

Subdivision names	Name transliterations
解放街	Jiefangjie
自由街	Ziyoujie
民主街	Minzhujie
胜利街	Shenglijie
东关	Dongguan
西关	Xiguan
北关	Beiguan
蒋家堡	Jiangjiapu
双营	Shuangying
广积屯	Guangjitun
王泉营	Wangquanying
司家营	Sijiaying
百眼泉	Baiyanquan
民主村	Minzhucun
南辛堡	Nanxinpu
李四官庄	Lisiguanzhuang
谷家营	Gujiaying
小营	Xiaoying
石河营	Shiheying
莲花池	Lianhuachi
上水磨	Shang Shuimo
下水磨	Xia Shuimo
王庄	Wangzhuang
三里河	Sanlihe
赵庄	Zhaozhuang
八里庄	Balizhuang
孟庄	Mengzhuang
老仁庄	Laorenzhuang
祁家堡	Qijiapu
米家堡	Mijiapu
唐家堡	Tangjiapu
卓家营	Zhuojiaying
陶庄	Taozhuang
鲁庄	Luzhuang
郎庄	Langzhuang
张庄	Zhangzhuang
西辛庄	Xixinhe
小河屯	Xiaohetun
付于屯	Fuyutun
东五里营	Dong Wuliying
新白庙	Xinbaimiao
东屯	Dongtun
中屯	Zhongtun
西屯	Xitun
西白庙	Xibaimiao

== See also ==
- List of township-level divisions of Beijing
