= S32 Xuanhua–Datong Expressway =

Expressway in mainland China

Xuanhua–Datong Expressway
- 宣化－大同高速公路
- Xuanda Expressway 宣大高速

Route information
- Length: 126 km (78 mi)

Major junctions
- East end: G6 Jingla Expressway in Xuanhua
- West end: S30 Sunyou Expressway in Yangyuan

Location
- Country: China
- Province: Hebei
- Counties: Xuanhua, Yangyuan

Highway system
- Transport in China

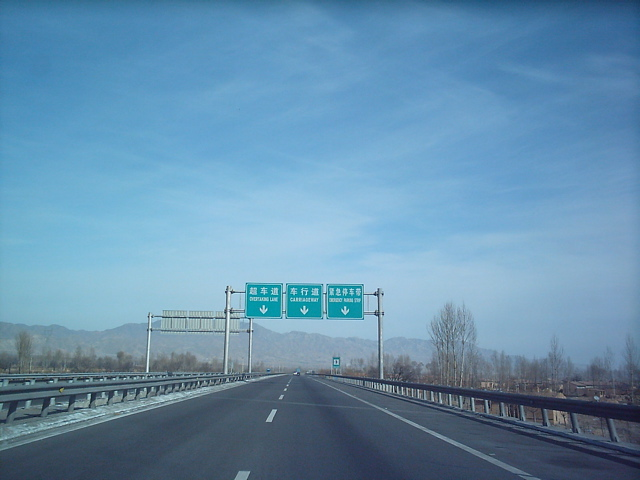
Xuanda Expressway

The Xuanda Expressway (宣大高速公路, Hanyu Pinyin: Xuāndà Gāosù Gōnglù; Approximate Pronunciation: "Shuen-Da Expressway"), is an expressway in China which links Xuanhua in Hebei province with Datong in Shanxi province.

The Xuanda Expressway gets its name by the combination of two one-character Chinese abbreviations of both Xuanhua and Datong (Xuanhua—Xuan, Datong—Da).

== Route ==
Basic route: Junction with G7 Jingla Expressway at Xuanhua - Yangyuan at Shanxi border where it becomes S30 Sunyou Expressway

Status: The entire expressway is complete and open to traffic.

The eastern end of the expressway links with the Jingzhang Expressway to Beijing and Zhangjiakou near Xuanhua, while the western end continues as the Sunyou Expressway, which keeps going to Datong.

The expressway's route runs slightly southwest, passing through Yangyuan in Hebei before entering Shanxi, continuing west, and reaching Datong.

=== Speed limit ===
Variable speed limits are generally 90–110 kilometres per hour (56–68 mph). Speed checks are rare.

=== Tolls ===
Entire stretch charges tolls. Toll system not networked. Central toll gate at jurisdictional change (Hebei/Shanxi province).

=== Lanes ===
4 lanes (2 up, 2 down) throughout.

=== Surface Conditions ===
Relatively good.

=== Traffic ===
Sparse to uncongested.

== History ==
Little is known about the history of the Xuanda Expressway. However, it was opened in December 2002, as part of China's 9th Five-Year Plan's major construction works. The expressway is often used for coal transport.

Its total length is around 126 kilometres. It forms part of the Jingda Expressway, which is a unified term for the Xuanda Expressway and the Jingzhang Expressway.

== Service areas ==
Xuanhua, Huashaoying, Yangyuan

== Detailed itinerary ==
From East to West
From West to East
