= Beijing–Zhangjiakou Expressway =

Expressway in Beijing and Hebei, China

- Jīngzhāng Gāosù Gōnglù 京张高速公路
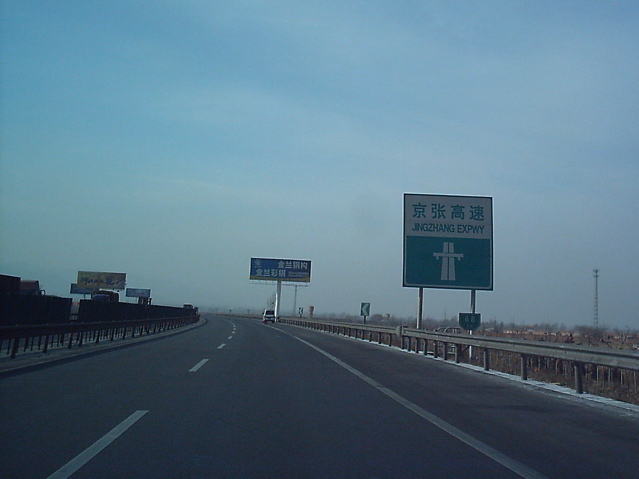

Route information
- Length: 79.2 km (49.2 mi)
- Component highways: G6

Major junctions
- From: Yanqing, Beijing
- To: Zhangjiakou

Location
- Country: China
- Major cities: Beijing, Hebei

Highway system
- Transport in China

The Jingzhang Expressway (Chinese: 京张高速公路; pinyin: Jīngzhāng Gāosù Gōnglù) is a 79.2 kilometres (49.2 mi) expressway in China connecting Beijing and Zhangjiakou. Construction began in 1998 and finished November 16, 2002. The expressway's name comes from the combination of one-character Chinese abbreviations for Beijing and Zhangjiakou (Beijing—Jing, Zhangjiakou—Zhang).

It is a part of the Jingda Expressway from central Beijing to Datong, in Shanxi province, which was built to reduce traffic on the increasingly congested China National Highway 110, which runs from Beijing to Qingtongxia.

The Jingzhang Expressway has shortened the driving time between Beijing and Zhangjiakou from over three hours to two hours. Its construction is a part of broader goals to improve the road network structure in Hebei Province, stimulate the economy along the route, and promote the economic development of the Zhangjiakou area.

== Route description ==
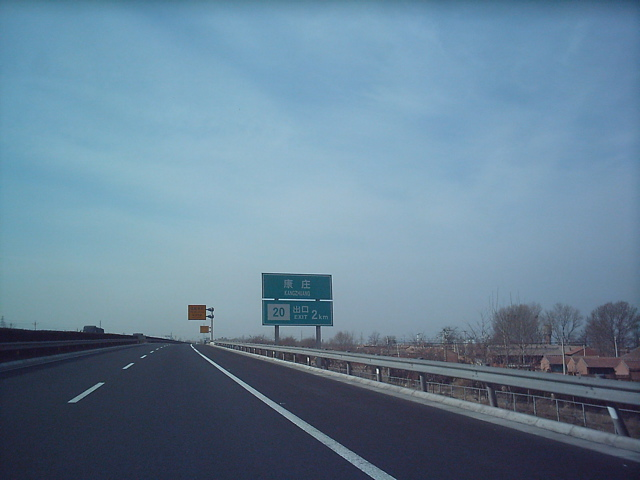
Beijing section of the Jingzhang Expressway in January 2005

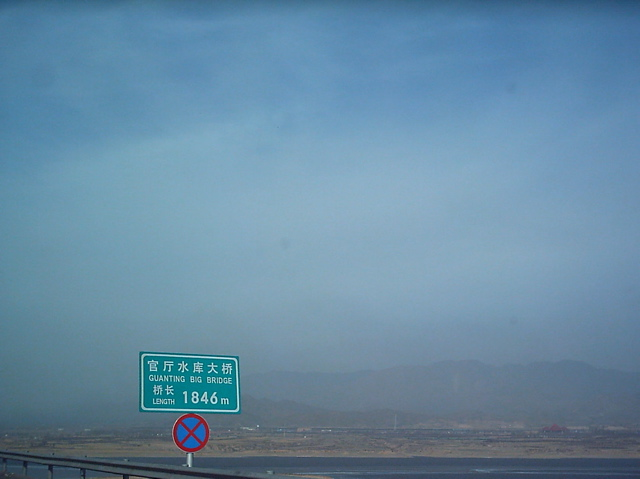
Guanting Reservoir Bridge in January 2005

The Jingzhang Expressway is part of the Jingda Expressway and a part of the China National highway system, a network of trunk ways across mainland China. It stretches from the Beijing City Limits Toll Gate to Zhangjiakou, crossing through locations such as the Guanting Reservoir. While the expressway starts in Beijing, the majority of it runs within Hebei province.

The basic route begins at Badaling Expressway; goes through Donghuayuan, Huailai, and Xiahuayuan; and terminates at Zhangjiakou.

== History ==
The expressway was created in segments, starting in Hebei. The challenge was how to cross the Guanting Reservoir. Initial plans avoided bridges and instead routed traffic around the reservoir. In the end, a bridge across the Guanting Reservoir was built, shortening the expressway's total distance.

The Jingzhang Expressway's final segment—linking it to the Badaling Expressway—was completed in November 2002. As of that moment, traffic could flow directly from Beijing through to Zhangjiakou in the form of a direct expressway. Previously, traffic entered the expressway bound for Zhangjiakou only at the Tumu toll gate (later disused), 97 kilometers (60 mi) from Beijing.

=== August 2010 traffic jam ===
Even though this initial traffic jam was solved, poor road conditions persisted for years. And in August 2010, one of the longest traffic jams ever recorded lasted more than ten days. Lorries carrying supplies to help road construction and ease congestion around the city were one of the main causes for the traffic jam. Roughly 100,000 travelers ended up in the traffic jam. Throughout the whole traffic jam vendors sold drivers and passengers food and water as they waited for the whole ordeal to end.

Potential trouble spots included:

- Guanting service area
- Toll gates (on the expressway, not at the individual exits)
- Major checkpoint at Kangzhuang, Beijing

At the toll station in Daijiaying, and at every exit in the Beijing direction, road signs urged drivers to use China National Highway 110 instead of the Jingzhang Expressway. The traffic jam meant that usual two-hour trip from Zhangjiakou to Beijing took nearly two days instead.

These traffic jams continued on and off well into 2005. As a result, a second expressway linking Beijing to Zhangjiakou is in the plans.

The main reason for the jams was bureaucracy. At every change of jurisdiction, there was a toll gate where lorries not only paid their tolls but also underwent weight examinations. The issue was every province had different standards and did not recognise the certificates issued from toll gates in other provinces claiming that the lorries were not overloaded, forcing trucks to redo the test in every province. Beijing enforced a very low tolerance and forced even passenger cars to undergo the weight examination.

If a lorry was overweight, it had to unload and pass through the test again. Few people cooperated, instead willing to sit it out by parking their lorries on the hard shoulder of the expressway. The average time it took for a lorry to get through the test varied from five to 50 minutes, depending on the results.

== Road conditions ==
=== Speed limit ===
Most of the expressway has a speed limit of 110 km/h. Hillier terrain and the Guanting Bridge have a lower speed limit of 80 km/h. Speed checks are rare.

=== Tolls ===
The entire stretch charges tolls. The toll system is not networked.

=== Lanes ===
The expressway has four lanes (two up, two down) throughout.

=== Surface conditions ===
Surface conditions are moderately good.

=== Traffic ===
Traffic conditions to Zhangjiakou from Beijing are better than those in the opposite direction.

== Major exits ==
Major exits from the expressway are at Donghuayuan, Huailai, Jimingyi, Xiahuayuan, and Zhangjiakou.

== Service areas ==
The Guanting Service Area is next to the Guanting Bridge.

== Connections ==
The expressway becomes Badaling Expressway 60 km from Beijing.

After exit no. 5, the Jingzhang Expressway spins off to the right; continuing straight ahead leads to Datong in Shanxi province via the Xuanda Expressway instead.

== List of exits ==
Key: ↗ = exit, ⇆ = main interchange; ¥ = central toll gate; S = service area

Exits heading west and northwest from Beijing (City Limits Toll Gate) are:

Continues from Badaling Expressway

- ¥ Beijing City Limits Toll Gate
- ↗ 1: Donghuayuan (Exit No. 1)
- Guanting Reservoir Bridge
- S Guanting Service Area
- ↗ 2: Chicheng, Huailai (Shacheng)
- ↗ 3: Jimingyi
- ↗ 4: Xiahuayuan
- ¥ Daijiaying
- ⇆ 5: (Interchange with Xuanda Expressway) Zhangjiakou, Banpojie
- ↗ Zhangjiakou
