= 5th Ring Road =

Ring road in Beijing, China

5th Ring Road
- 五环路
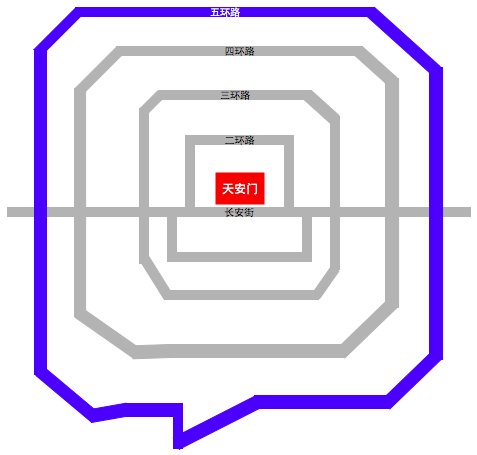

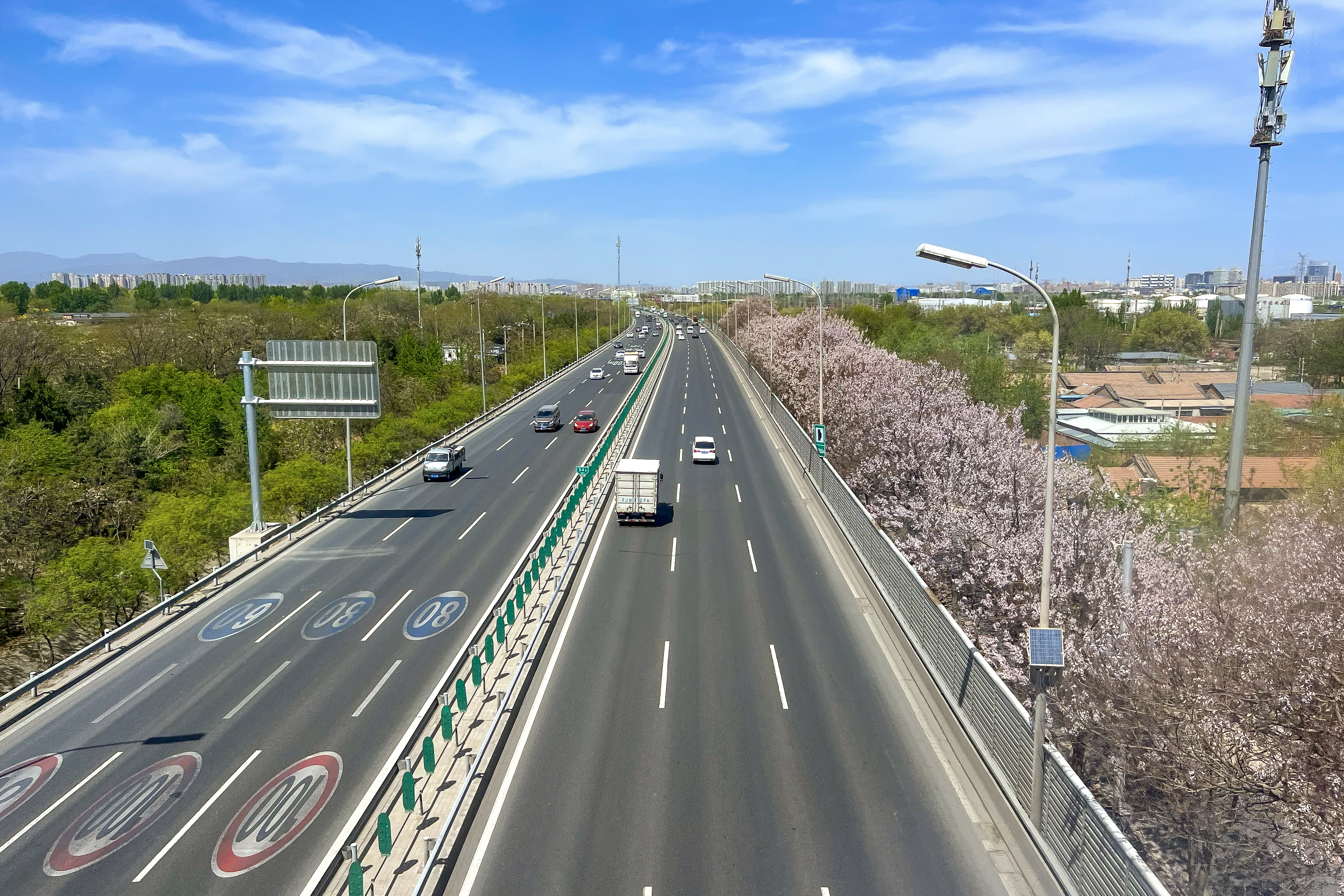
- The southwestern portion of 5th Ring Road in April 2024

Route information
- Length: 98 km (61 mi)
- Existed: 2001–present

Location
- Country: China
- Province: Beijing

Highway system
- Transport in China; Expressways of Beijing
← Beijing S46	→ Beijing S51

Beijing's 5th Ring Road (simplified Chinese: 五环路; traditional Chinese: 五環路; pinyin: Wǔ Huán Lù) is a ring road encircling the city about 10 kilometres (6.2 mi) away from the city centre. It takes the form of an expressway and is 98 kilometres (61 mi) in length. Being a ring road, it has no natural start or end point, although the "0 km" mark is near the northeastern stretch at Laiguangying, at the intersection with the Jingcheng Expressway. The expressway ring road is a provincial-level road in Beijing municipality.

All of Beijing's expressways, except for the Tongyan Expressway, are interlinked with the 5th Ring Road.

Portions of the expressway have a maximum speed limit of 90 km/h, with the remainder imposing a speed limit of 100 km/h. There is a universal minimum speed limit of 50 km/h.

The 5th Ring Road has three lanes in each direction, for a total of six lanes.

== History ==
The route was originally called the "1st Expressway Ring Road", as it would take the form of an expressway, and therefore become the city's first expressway ring road. However, given the fact that the 2nd Ring Road, 3rd Ring Road and 4th Ring Road were in existence, re-ordering it as a ring road with a number value of 1, especially as it was outside the 4th Ring Road, looked odd. Therefore, it was renamed the 5th Ring Road, after some debate.

Work began soon after and the first portion of the ring road opened in 2001, linking the Badaling Expressway with the Airport Expressway. Further stretches of the road were soon opened. By mid-2003, half of the ring road was open, from the western end connecting the West Chang'an Avenue to the interchange in the southeast with the Jingjintang Expressway.

The ring road was completed in its entirety on November 1, 2003, with the intersections with the Jingshi Expressway and the Jingkai Expressway. Also completed on that same day was the Xiaoyue Tunnel—noticeable for being the only tunnel on any of the Ring Roads of Beijing.

The 5th Ring Road is home to the Shifeng Bridge. This bridge was built and actually had to be rotated after it was built to link the two ends of the southwestern 5th Ring Road together. Underneath the bridge ran several important rail lines that could not be interrupted while the bridge was being built, which made it impossible for the Shifeng Bridge to be built like a normal bridge. It was instead constructed in parts extending the expressway as it went along. The completion of this colossal work accelerated the completion of the entire ring road.

At night, the Shifeng Bridge looks spectacular. It apparently is a trademark bridge of the expressway ring road.

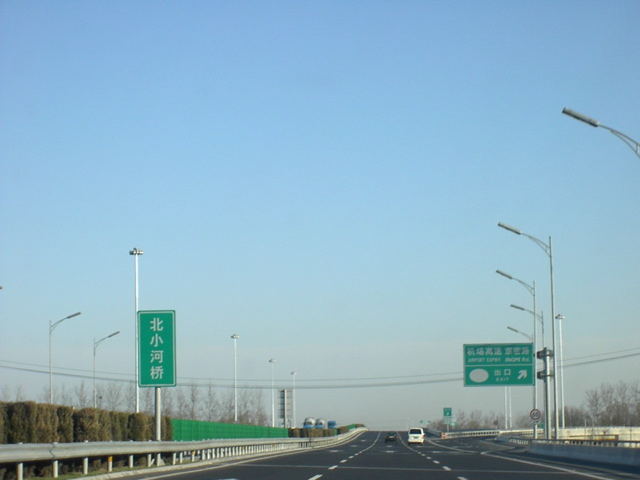
Beijing's 5th Ring Road (taken in March 2003)

=== Recent history ===
By mid-December 2004, a second exit lane was fitted for the Wangjing Science and Technology Park exit (clockwise direction). Previously, traffic used to clog up the entire ring road (at around 6 p.m. – 7 p.m. local time every workday) near that exit, as it is very close to Wangjing. Also, a second exit liaising directly with Wangjing is under construction; it is very close to the Wangjing filling station on the ring road (clockwise direction again).

== Tolls ==
When the 5th Ring Road was completed (and even while segments were already open to the traffic), the expressway became a toll ring road. The charge was 0.5 CNY per kilometre as a minimum for small vehicles (which would equate to just around 6 cents U.S.).

The charge, although small, was exorbitant for many drivers, who shied away from the expressway. Further protests derived from the apparent fact that drivers were being charged the full CNY 5 for just one kilometre of the road, from Yizhuang to the Jingjintang Expressway. Additionally, users of the Badaling Expressway and the Jingkai Expressway, which have toll gates within the 5th Ring Road, moaned about being charged twice – once for the 5th Ring Road, and once again for the expressway connecting the ring road.

Beijingers soon learned to avoid this pricey path at all costs, preferring to sit out hours in jams on the 4th Ring Road and roads more central to Beijing. Thus, the 5th Ring Road became a virtually "wasted" ring expressway. As a result, this expressway was the subject of a heated debate in 2003. It became apparent that the 5th Ring Road was made just for those who could afford both the petrol and the tolls. Meanwhile, it became a kind of an unofficial test track for new drivers, who racked up spectacular (and, strictly speaking, illegal) speeds on the nearly empty expressway.

With Shoufa, the company running the expressway, unwilling to budge, standing firm to its view that the prices were authorised by the local Price Bureau, and with enough disgruntled Beijingers posting on message boards demanding the removal of the tolls, the authorities stepped in at the end of December 2003 and decreed that the road be made free on the first day of 2004. (At the same time, all charges for expressway exits within the confines of the 5th Ring Road were also done away with.) When the tolls were removed, usage of the 5th Ring Road gradually increased. The ring road previously managed with only 10% of its total designed capacity.

The expressway ring road, even without the charges, remains uncrowded today, except for any occurrence of a serious accident.

The sole remaining toll is located at Shangqing Bridge.

== Traffic jams ==
The section from Wufang Bridge to Shangqing Bridge in both directions has a moderate to high risk of traffic jams due to its proximity to important residential districts and tourist destinations, such as Wangjing, Beiyuan, and Yayuncun. This section has, unusually, a much higher risk for congestion than the 4th Ring Road (both directions) during rush hour, despite the section past the Wuyuan Bridge (inner ring direction) having a speed limit of 100 km/h and the expressway being more distant from the city centre.

== Bridges on the 5th Ring Road ==
Note: ↑ denotes an overpass, ↓ an underpass, and ⇆ an interchange bridge with exit.

=== Northern 5th Ring Road ===
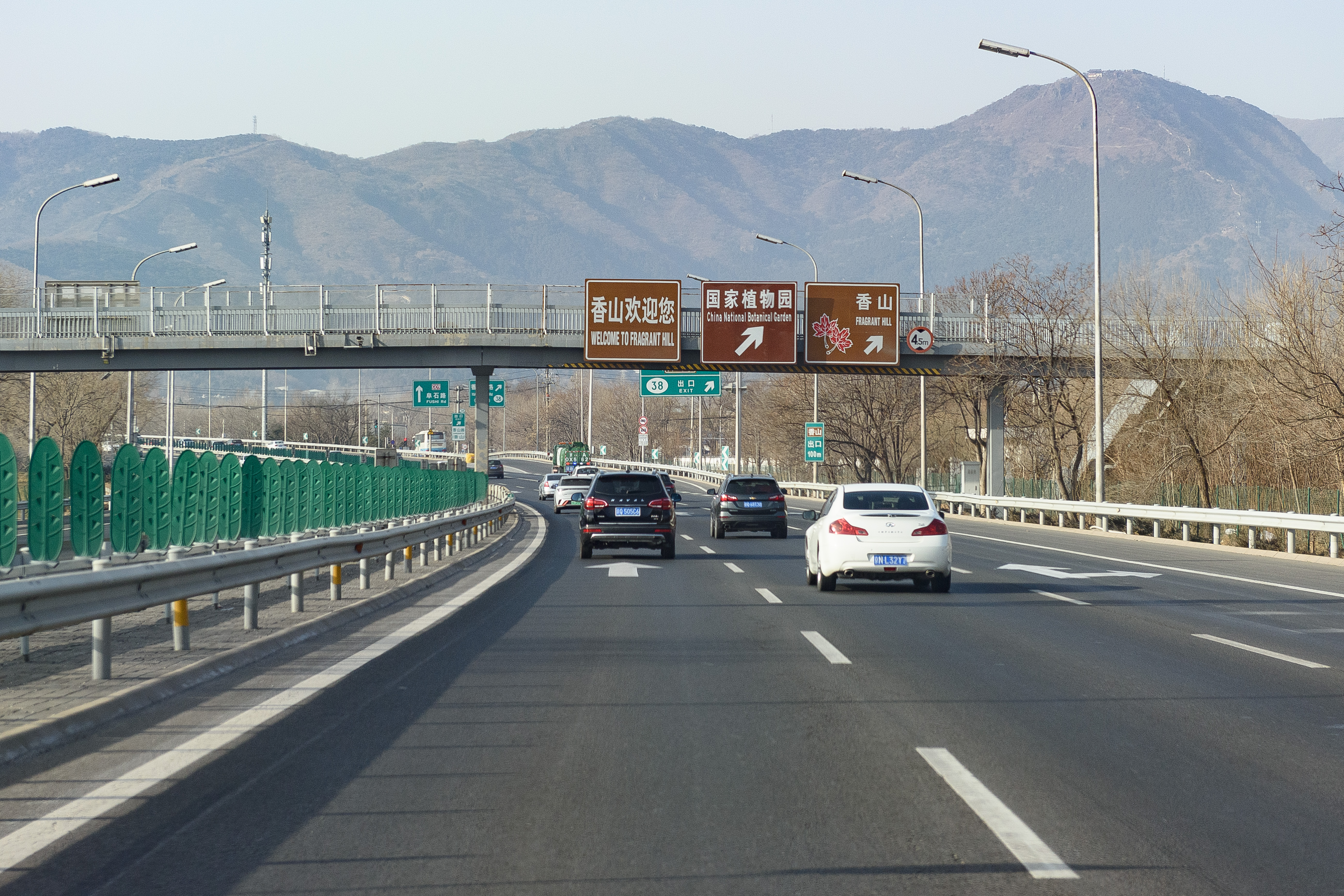
North 5th Ring Road West near Fragrant Hills (January 2023 image)

- ↑ Gongdesi Bridge
- ↑ Hongshan Bridge
- ⇆ Xiaojiayuan Bridge
- ⇆ Xianghongqi Bridge
- ↓ Jianting Bridge
- ↓ Shangqing West Bridge
- ⇆ Shangqing Bridge
- ↑ Lincui Bridge
- ↓ Tianchen Bridge
- ⇆ Yangshan Bridge
- ↓ Beiyuan Bridge
- ↓ Gujiazhuang Bridge
- ⇆ Laiguangying Bridge
- ⇆ Guangshun Bridge
- ↓ Guangze Bridge
- ↑ Wuyuan North Bridge / Beixiaohe Bridge

=== Eastern 5th Ring Road ===
- ⇆ Wuyuan Bridge
- ↓ Huantie North Bridge
- ↑ Huantie Bridge
- ⇆ Qikeshu Bridge
- ⇆ Pingfang Bridge
- ↓ Baijialou Bridge
- ↑ Dahuangzhuang Bridge
- ⇆ Yuantong Bridge
- ⇆ Wufang Bridge
- ⇆ Huagong Bridge
- ↑ Xizhihe Bridge
- ⇆ Dayangfang North Bridge
- ⇆ Dayangfang Bridge

=== Southern 5th Ring Road ===
- ⇆ Ronghua Bridge
- ⇆ Yizhuang Bridge
- ↑ Jiuzong Bridge
- ↑ Demao Bridge
- ↑ Yinluchi Bridge
- ↓ Tuanhe Bridge
- ↑ Jingxian Bridge
- ↑ Jinxi Bridge
- ↑ Tonghua Bridge
- ⇆ Xihongmen South Bridge
- ⇆ Xinhua Bridge
- ↓ Liying Bridge
- ⇆ Langfa East Bridge
- ↑ Langfa West Bridge

=== Western 5th Ring Road ===
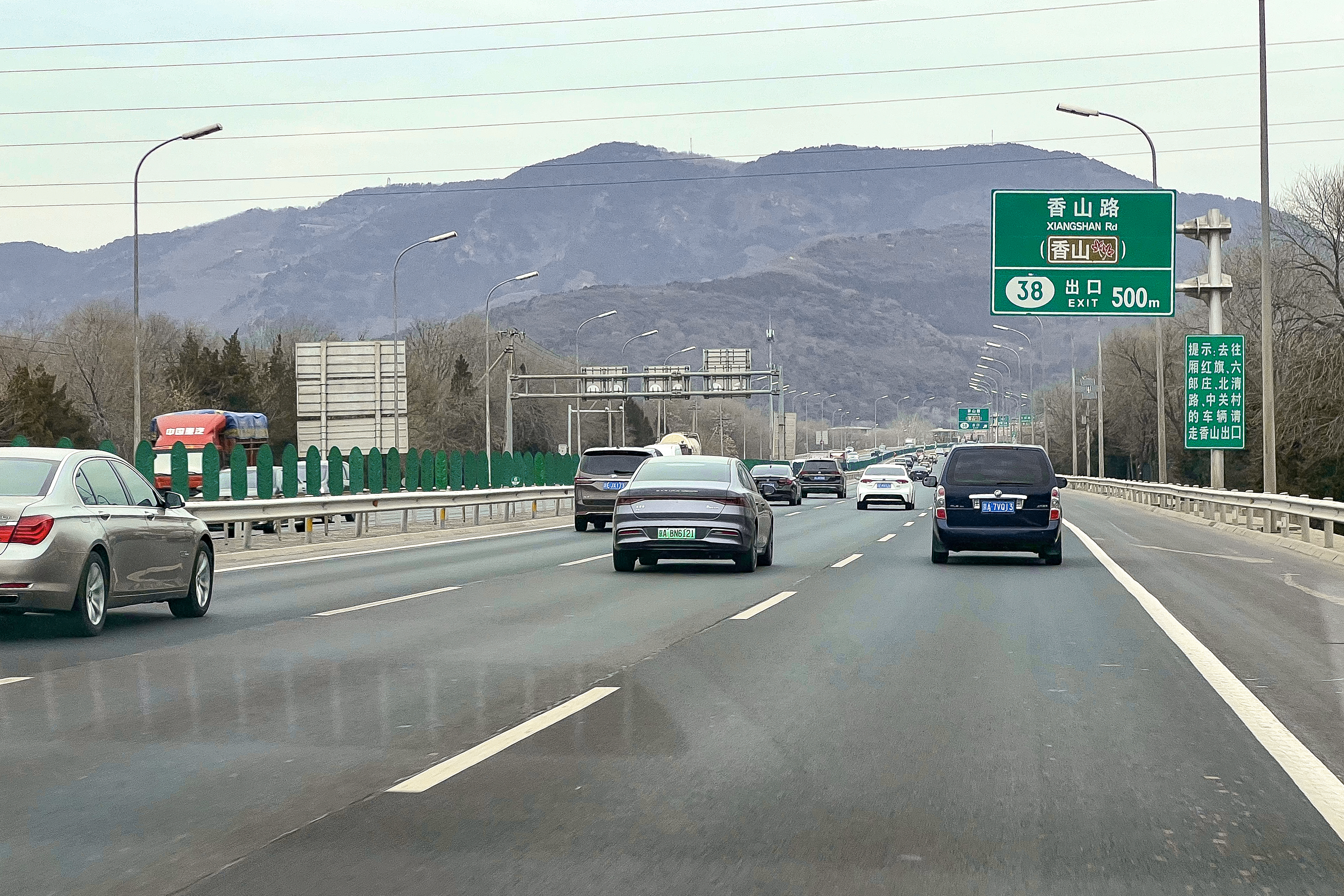
The western Fifth Ring Road in 2023

- ⇆ Wanping Bridge
- ↑ Shifeng Bridge
- ↓ Yamenkou Bridge
- ↑ Lugu Bridge
- ⇆ Bajiao Bridge
- ⇆ Jinyuan Bridge
- ↓ Gengcun Bridge
- ↓ Xihuangcun Bridge
- ⇆ Xingshikou Bridge
- ⇆ Minxi Bridge
- ⇆ Xiangquan Bridge

== List of exits ==
Symbols: ↗ = exit (✕ = closed), ⇆ = main interchange; S = service area.

=== Eastern 5th Ring Road ===
- ↗ 3: Dongba, Qikeshu
- ↗ 4: Yaojiayuan Road
- ⇆ 5: (Interchange with Jingtong Expressway) Jingtong Expressway
- S Guanyingtang West
- ⇆ 6: (Interchange with Jingshen Expressway) Jingshen Expressway
- ↗ 7: Taihu
- S Xiaoyangfang
- ⇆ 10: (Interchange with Jingjintang Expressway) Jingjintang Expressway

=== Anticlockwise direction ===
- ⇆ 10: (Interchange with Jingjintang Expressway) Jingjintang Expressway
- ↗ 9: Yizhuang
- S Xiaoyangfang
- ↗ 8: Ciqu, Shibalidian
- S Guanyingtang West
- ⇆ 6: (Interchange with Jingshen Expressway) Jingshen Expressway
- ⇆ 5: (Interchange with Jingtong Expressway) Jingtong Expressway
- ↗ 4: Yaojiayuan Road
- ↗ 3: Dongba, Qikeshu

== Cultural references ==
There is a song circulating on the Chinese internet since the 2010s called the Song of the 5th Ring. The most famous cover of this song was performed by MC HotDog and Yue Yunpeng, used as an interlude of the movie Jian Bing Man.
