= Badaling Expressway =

Expressway in Beijing, China

Badaling Expressway
- 八达岭高速公路
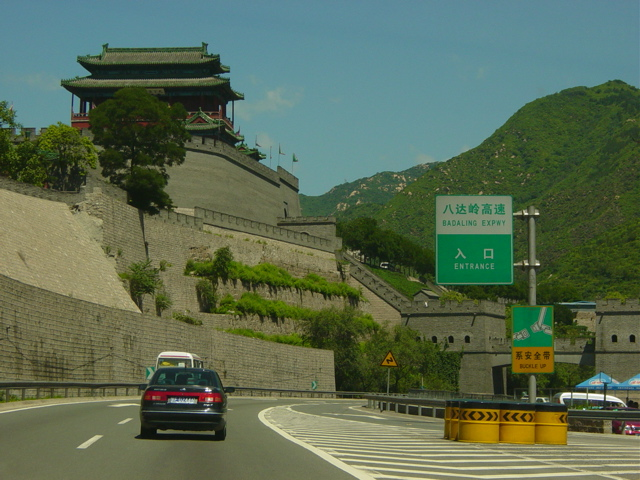
- The Badaling Expressway at Juyongguan

Route information
- Length: 61.9 km (38.5 mi)
- Existed: 1998–present
- History: Prior to 2005: Designated G025, part of the Danyang–Lhasa Expressway; 2005 – present: Designated G6, part of the Beijing–Lhasa Expressway
- Component highways: G6 (Madian–Yanqing)

Major junctions
- South end: Outer Deshengmen Street and 3rd Ring Road at Madian, Beijing
- North end: Beijing S217 / Beijing S303 in Kangzhuang, Beijing

Location
- Country: China
- Province: Beijing

Highway system
- National Trunk Highway System; Primary; Auxiliary

The Badaling Expressway (Simplified Chinese: 八达岭高速公路, Traditional Chinese: 八達嶺高速公路, Hanyu Pinyin: Bādálíng Gāosù Gōnglù) is an expressway in China linking urban Beijing to the Badaling stretch of the Great Wall of China. It continues toward Yanqing and leaves Beijing, becoming the Jingzhang Expressway.

Starting north of Madian Overpass on the Northern 3rd Ring Road, it runs for 61.9 kilometres towards Yanqing District.

The Badaling Expressway gets its name from the Badaling stretch of the Great Wall.

== History ==
The expressway was constructed in January 1996 in three stages, culminating in the completion of the 61.9 kilometre long road in October 1998.

The previous expressway did not link with the Jingzhang Expressway. After the linking was complete, the stretch to Yanqing and Kangzhuang was opened, and the toll gate at Juyongguan was put out of service soon after.

== Road conditions ==
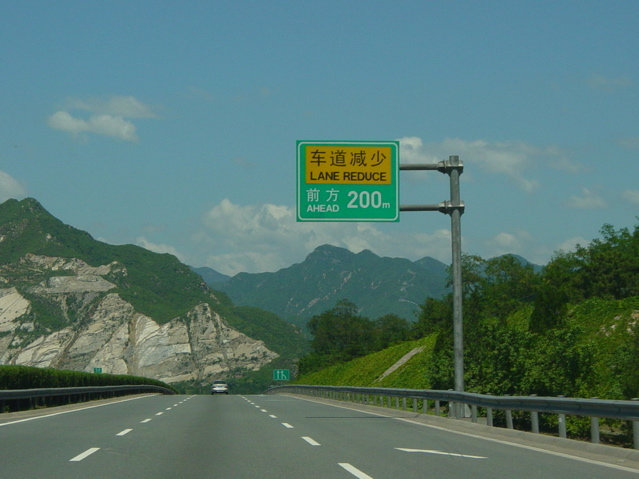
The Badaling Expressway gets into "climbing gear" as it approaches the hilly terrain near Badaling

=== Tolls ===
Tolls are CN¥0.5/km as of 5th Ring Road intersection for sections south of the toll gate. (The 5th Ring Road intersection is free only for vehicles heading north toward Badaling.)
The entire stretch north of the 5th Ring Road to Kangzhuang costs CN¥35 (for small passenger cars).

=== Lanes ===
The expressway is 6 lanes (3 up, 3 down) from Madian - Nankou; and 4 lanes (2 up, 2 down) thereafter.

=== Traffic ===
Traffic is mainly concentrated in the Madian - Huilongguan section, and the Shangqing Bridge is a traffic bottleneck.

== Major exits ==
Beijing Section: N. 3rd Ring Road, N. 4th Ring Road, N. 5th Ring Road, Huilongguan, N. 6th Ring Road, Changping, Nankou, Badaling, Yanqing.

== Connections ==
Ring Roads of Beijing: Connects with the N. 3rd Ring Road at Madian, the N. 4th Ring Road at Jianxiang Bridge, the N. 5th Ring Road at Qinghe, and the N. 6th Ring Road at Baige.

Jingzhang Expressway: Becomes the Jingzhang Expressway west of the City Boundary toll gate.

== The Expressway and the Great Wall ==
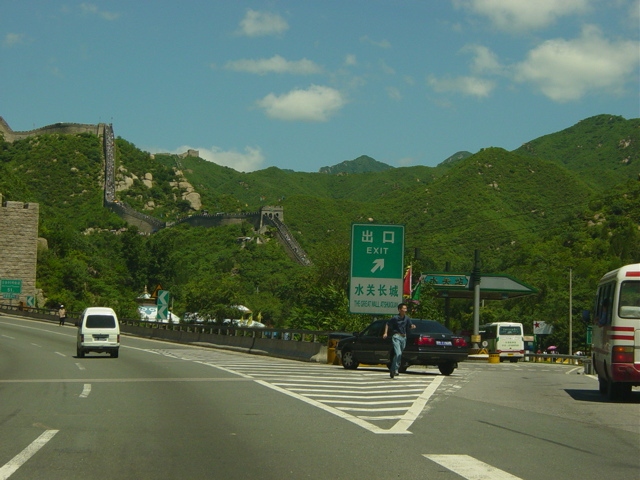
The Badaling Expressway and the Great Wall at Shuiguan

The expressway passes by the Great Wall of China in the Badaling region. As a result, it offers three exits which are linked immediately (or in the vicinity of) with the Great Wall. (Note: All of these exits are in the split section of the expressway heading out of Beijing.)

Juyongguan Exit - Exit No. 15: The Great Wall at Juyongguan Pass is linked immediately with the expressway. Juyongguan Pass is a fort which is nearest Beijing the most. A stretch of Great Wall is also next to the Pass.

Shuiguan Exit - Exit No. 16: From the top there is a stretch of the Wall which has yet to be repaired (also known as "the wild Great Wall").

Badaling Exit - Exit No. 18: The most famous and most frequented of all three exits is the one at Badaling.

== The "Valley of Death" ==
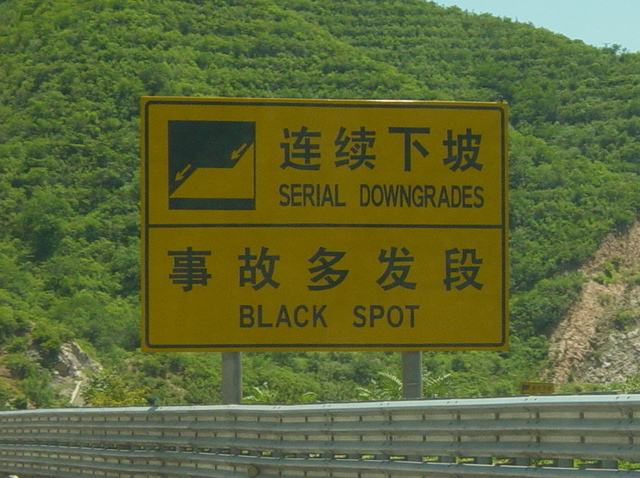
"Black spot" here refers to the increased number of accidents

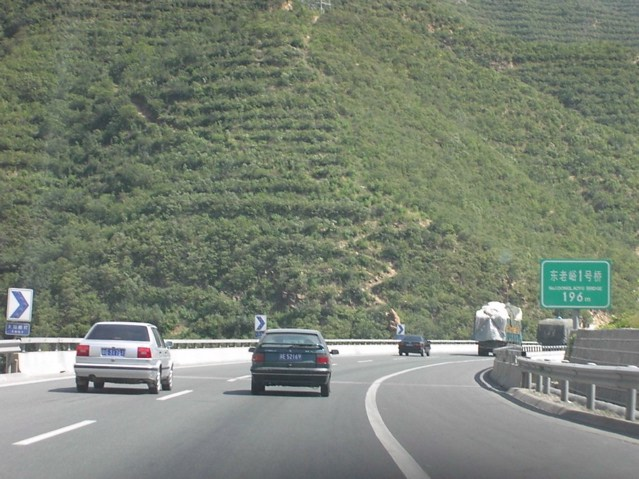
The Badaling Expressway entering Beijing, in the "Valley of Death"

=== Valley of Death ===
Kilometre sections 50-55 of the expressway into Beijing has what the road sign labels as "serial downgrades". It actually means that there are continuous curves heading downward. Fatal accidents occur frequently here.

=== Response ===
Beijing police authorities enacted a low speed limit of 60 km/h for light-duty vehicles and 40 km/h for lorries. Lorries with questionable brakes and overloaded lorries are forced into a service area. Massive, nearly ubiquitous signposts were put in place, urging people to slow down, and numerous cameras are on permanent lookout for people who drive too quickly. A valley-wide loudspeaker system broadcasts speeders' vehicle licence numbers, and an electronic display records the licence plate of the speeding vehicle. Those who are caught face heavy fines and licence suspension. According to the Road Traffic Safety Law of the People's Republic of China, exceeding 50% of the regulated limit results in loss of driving licence (plus a 2-year waiting period for reapplications) and a fine of CN¥2,000 (approximately US$260).

Five speed cameras and a GPRS wireless network for violator data transfer make this system highly effective. There is little tolerance outside of the posted speed limits.

=== Safety and results ===
Car safety is also a major feature on this part of the expressway. There are many emergency brake-fail areas, where cars that suffer brake failure can slow down by rolling into an upward hill full of pebbles. There are also "Vehicle Self-Check Lines", emergency bays where faulty cars can be parked and the car itself checked for any mechanical problems.

No fatal accidents have occurred in the 200 days after the implementation of the new system.

== List of exits ==
=== Beijing section ===
Listed are exits heading north and northwest as of Madian (N. 3rd Ring Road).
Symbols: ↗ = exit (↘ = exit only, → = only when heading for Kangzhuang, ← = only when heading for Madian), ⇆ = main interchange; ¥ = central toll gate, S = service area

- ⇆ 1: (Interchange with 3rd Ring Road) N. 3rd Ring Road
- ⇆ 2: (Interchange with 4th Ring Road) Beisihuan
- ↗ Anxiang North Road
- ↗ 5: (→, ↘) Qinghe and "999" Station
- ¥ Qinghe Central
- ⇆ 4: (Interchange with 5th Ring Road) N. 5th Ring Road -- exit numbering fell into disarray here
- ↗ 7: Xisanqi
- S Service Area, Filling Station
- ↗ 8: (→) Huillongguan
- ↗ 9: Bei'anhe
- ↗ 10: (→) Shahe, Yangfang
- ↗ 11: Xiaotangshan, Baige Road
- ⇆ 12: (Interchange with 6th Ring Road) Mentougou, Shunyi (N. 6th Ring Road) -- note: Road connection to Mentougou ✕
- S Service Area
- ↗ 13A: (→) Science Park
- ↗ 13B: (→) Changping, Ming Tombs
- ↗ 13C: (→) Changping Xiguan
- ↗ 13: (←) Changping, Huairou, Ming Tombs
- ↗ 14: Nankou, Chenzhuang
- ↗ 15: (→) The Great Wall at Juyongguan
- ↗ 16: (→, ↘) The Great Wall at Shuiguan
- ↗ 18: (→, ↘) The Great Wall at Badaling
- ↗ 19: Yanqing
- ↗ 20: Kangzhuang (→) / Kangzhuang, Badaling (←)
- ¥ City Boundary

Continues as Jingzhang Expressway

== See also ==
- China National Highways
- Expressways of Beijing
- Expressways of China
