= Qiaozhong Road Tunnel =

Road tunnel in Haikou, China

Coordinates: 20.020738°N 110.316284°E

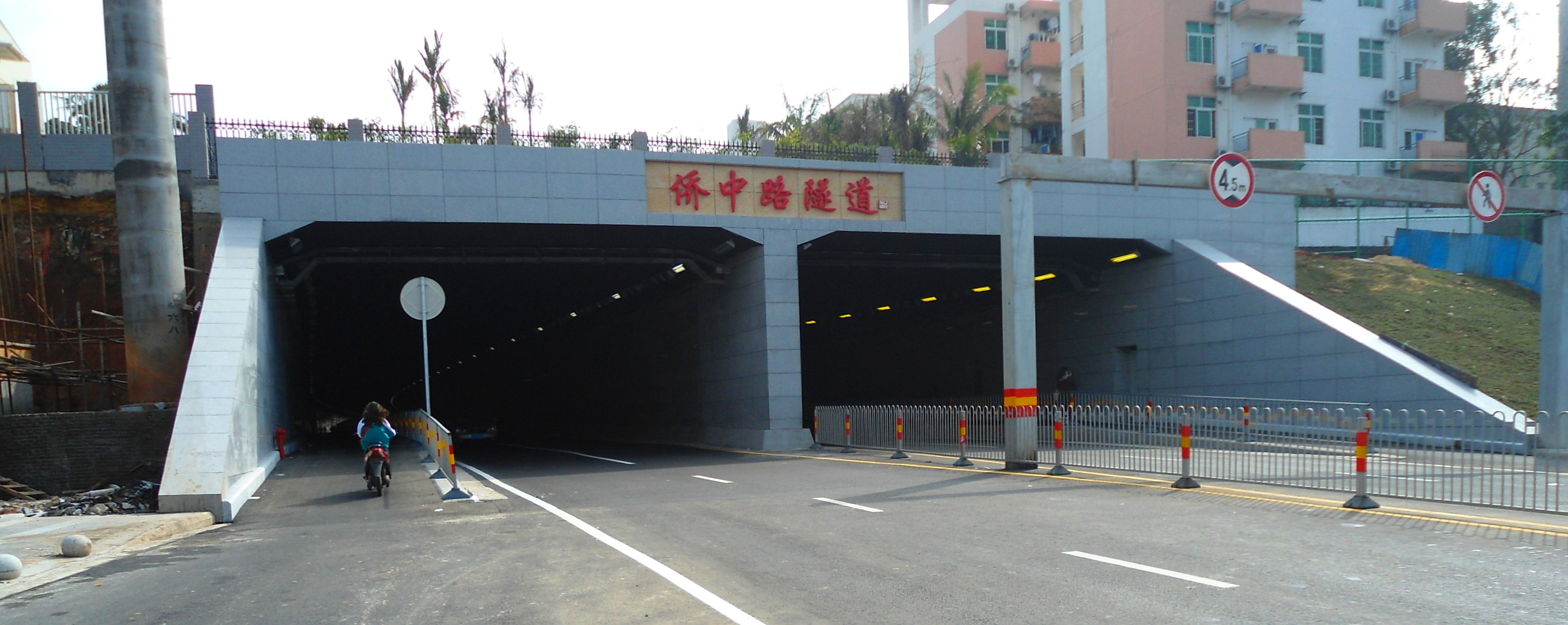
- North entrance
- Interactive map of Qiaozhong Road Tunnel

Overview
- Location: Haikou, Hainan Province, China

The Qiaozhong Road Tunnel (Chinese: 海口侨中路隧道) is a tunnel in Haikou, Hainan Province, China. It connects Qiaozhong Road with Yusha Road, and is the only tunnel in the city.

The tunnel runs north-south, with two lanes in each direction, separated by a full, solid wall. The sides of the tunnel have a separate route which is shared by two-wheeled vehicles and pedestrians. This is separated from the main motor vehicle traffic by a low fence, and is raised to curb height. The tunnel is well-lit, with large cylindrical ventilation fans located on the ceiling. The walls are made of sheets of polished, cut stone.

== Gallery ==
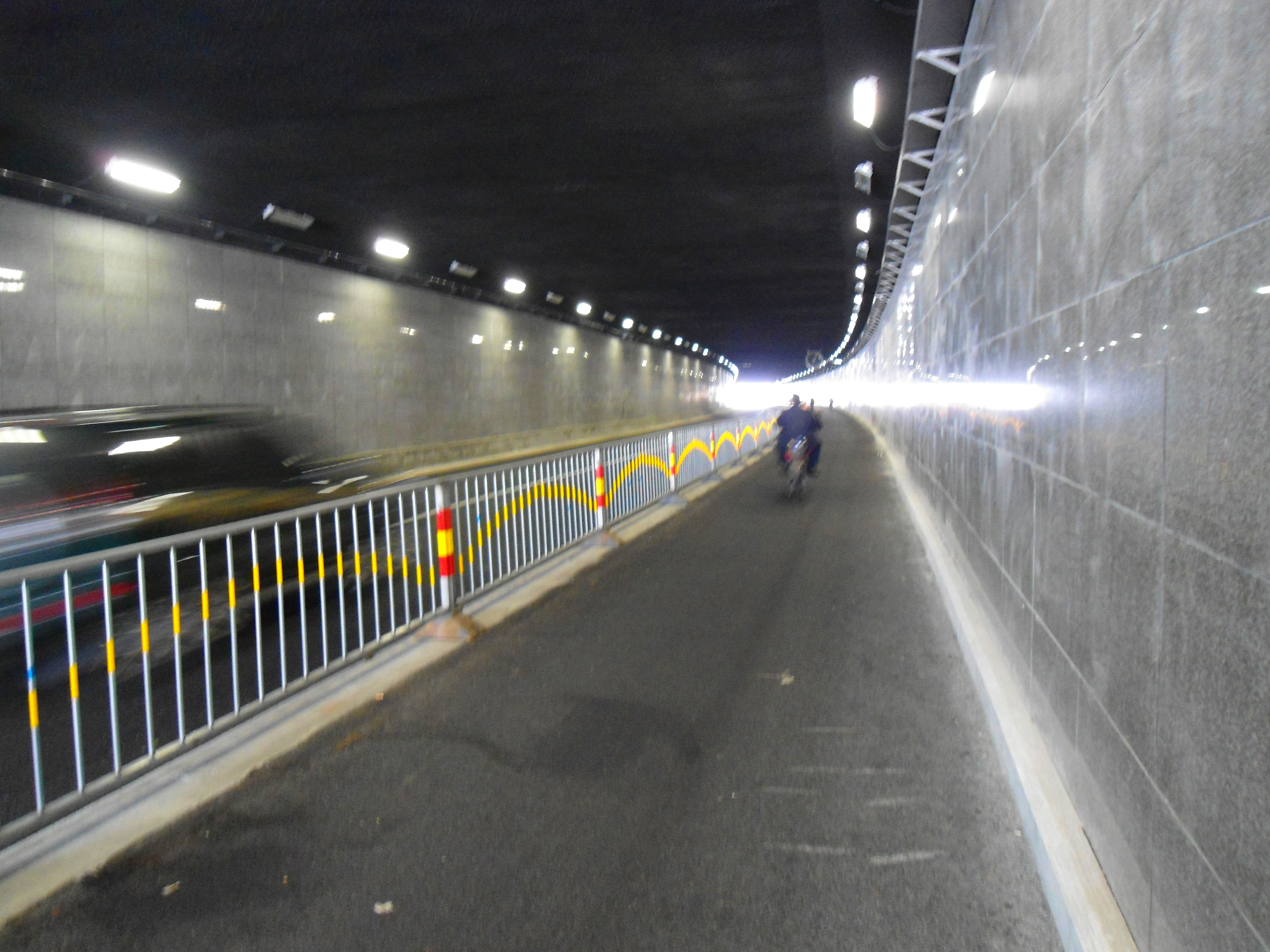
Interior facing north

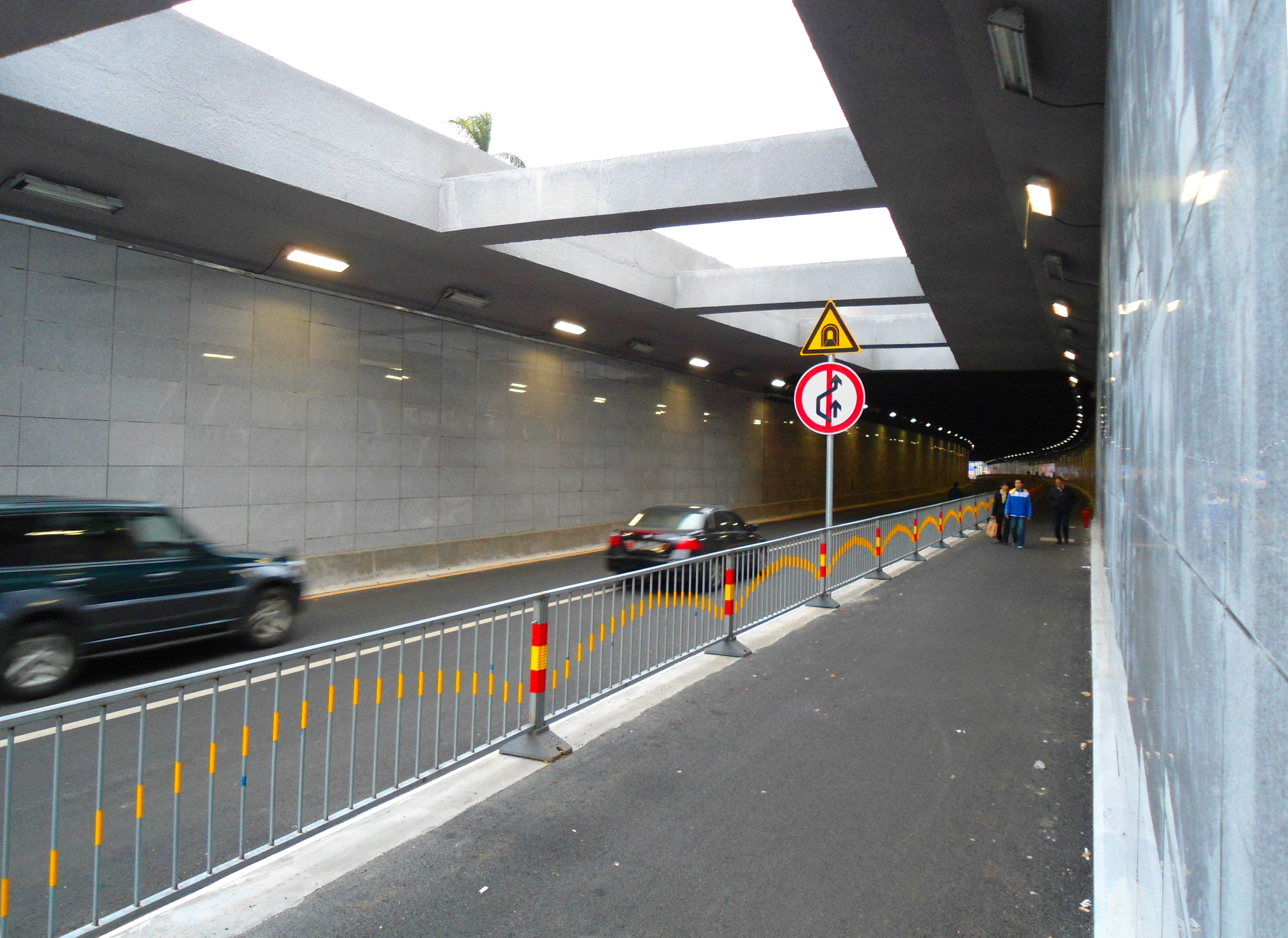
Interior facing north

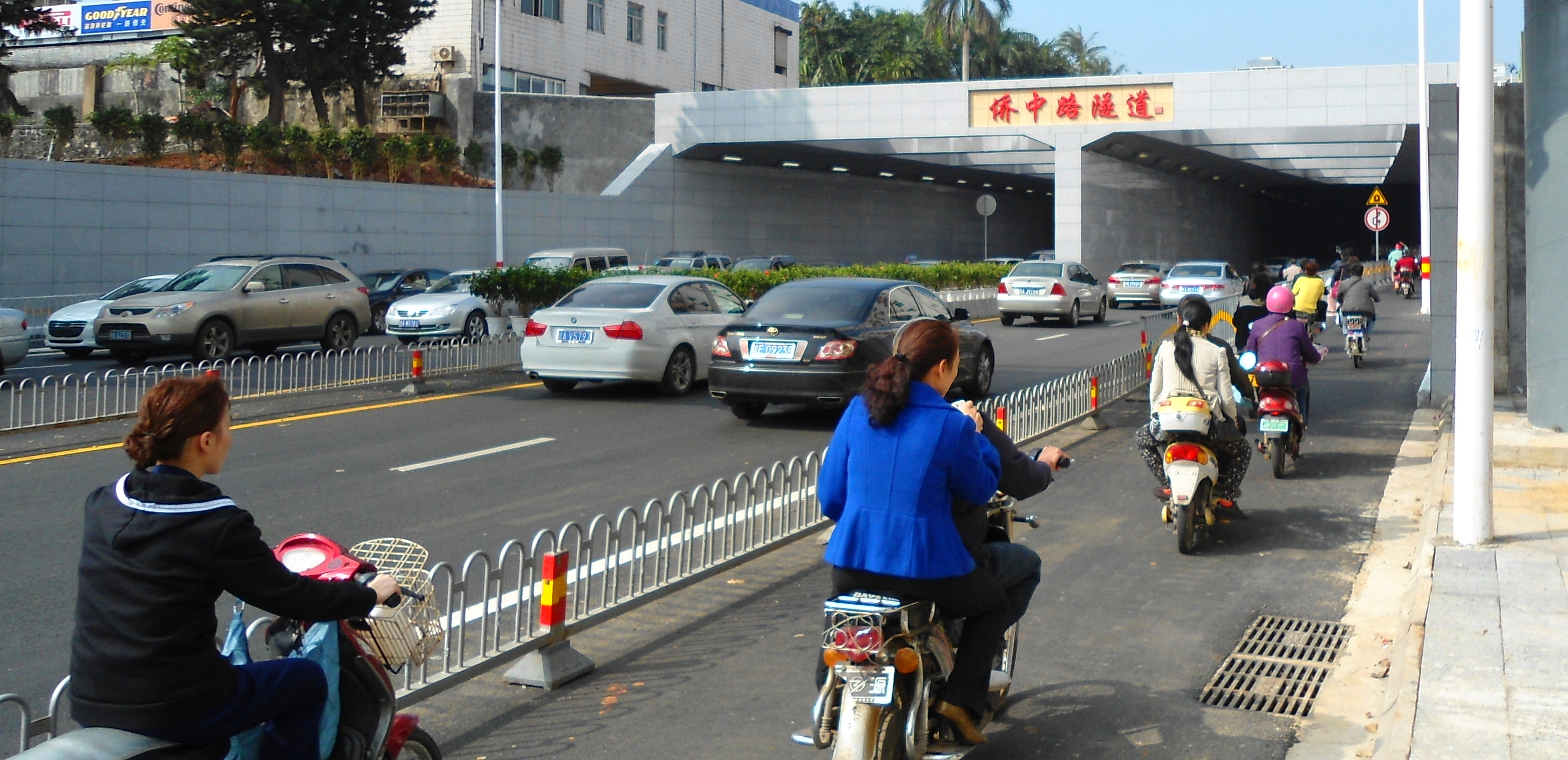
South entrance

== See also ==
- Wenming East Road Tunnel
- List of tunnels in China
