= Shangqing Bridge =

Overpass in Beijing, China

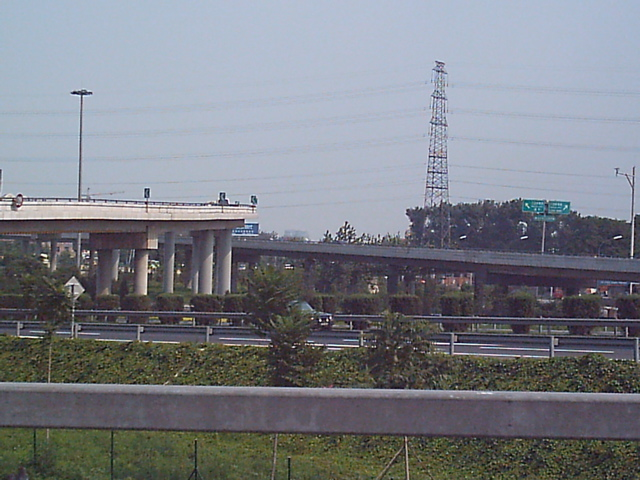
The 5th Ring Road at Shangqing Bridge (July 2004 image)

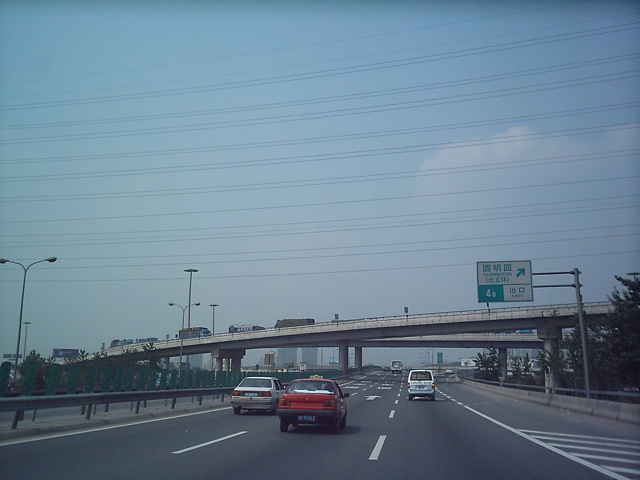
Shangqing Bridge's Problem: Jammed Traffic (as can be seen on the bridge) (July 2004 image)

Shangqing Bridge (simplified Chinese: 上清桥; traditional Chinese: 上清橋; pinyin: Shàngqīng Qiáo) is an overpass in Beijing. It is an intersection where the northern stretch of the 5th Ring Road and the Badaling Expressway meet.

== History ==
The bridge was on the route of the 2008 Summer Olympics cycling race.

== See also ==
- 5th Ring Road (Beijing)
- Badaling Expressway
