= Dongjingji =

Dongjingji 东井集镇
- Town
- Dōngjĭngjí Zhèn
- Location in Hebei Location in China
- Coordinates: 40°02′53″N 114°00′56″E
- Country: People's Republic of China
- Province: Hebei
- Prefecture-level city: Zhangjiakou
- County: Yangyuan

Area
  - Total: 123.0 km^{2} (47.5 sq mi)

Population (2010)
  - Total: 26,561
  - Density: 216/km^{2} (560/sq mi)
- Time zone: UTC+8 (China Standard)

Dongjingji (Chinese: 东井集镇; pinyin: Dōngjĭngjí Zhèn) is a town located in Yangyuan County, Zhangjiakou, Hebei, China. According to the 2010 census, Dongjingji had a population of 26,561, including 13,727 males and 12,834 females. The population was distributed as follows: 4,580 people aged under 14, 18,569 people aged between 15 and 64, and 3,412 people aged over 65.

== See also ==
- List of township-level divisions of Hebei
