= Gaoqiang Township =

Gaoqiang Township 高墙乡
- Township
- Location in Hebei
- Coordinates: 40°17′17″N 114°36′37″E
- Country: People's Republic of China
- Province: Hebei
- Prefecture-level city: Zhangjiakou
- County: Yangyuan County
- Time zone: UTC+8 (China Standard)

Gaoqiang Township (simplified Chinese: 高墙乡; traditional Chinese: 高牆鄉; pinyin: Gāoqiáng Xiāng) is a township under the administration of Yangyuan County in Hebei province, China. As of 2020, it administers the following 27 villages:

- Gaoqiang Village
- Nankou Village (南口村)
- Jiugou Village (九沟村)
- Duanjiazhuang Village (段家庄村)
- Yaojiazhuang Village (姚家庄村)
- Beidazhuang Village (北大庄科村)
- Qinggeta Village (青圪塔村)
- Nandazhuangke Village (南大庄科村)
- Fanjiafang Village (范家坊村)
- Taishiliang Village (太师梁村)
- Niujiafang Village (牛家坊村)
- Majiazhuang Village (马家庄村)
- Shamaotai Village (沙帽台村)
- Jinjiazhuang Village (金家庄村)
- Yiduquan Village (益堵泉村)
- Jiunüchi Village (九女池村)
- Xiguanzhuang Village (西官庄村)
- Dongguanzhuang Village (东官庄村)
- Daheigou Village (大黑沟村)
- Shangshagou Village (上沙沟村)
- Wangjiashan Village (王家山村)
- Zhaojiaping Village (赵家坪村)
- Liujiazui Village (刘家嘴村)
- Heiyan Village (黑岩村)
- Sanguanmiao Village (三官庙村)
- Guduanzhuang Village (谷端庄村)
- Taijiazhuang Village (台家庄村)
