= Futujiang Township =

Futujiang Township 浮图讲乡
- Rural Township
- Fútújiǎng Xiāng
- Location in Hebei Location in China
- Coordinates: 40°05′27″N 114°21′16″E
- Country: People's Republic of China
- Province: Hebei
- Prefecture-level city: Zhangjiakou
- County: Yangyuan

Area
  - Total: 169.0 km^{2} (65.3 sq mi)

Population (2010)
  - Total: 10,072
  - Density: 59.61/km^{2} (154.4/sq mi)
- Time zone: UTC+8 (China Standard)

Futujiang Township (Chinese: 浮图讲乡; pinyin: Fútújiǎng Xiāng) is a rural township located in Yangyuan County, Zhangjiakou, Hebei, China. According to the 2010 census, Futujiang Township had a population of 10,072, including 5,173 males and 4,899 females. The population was distributed as follows: 1,776 people aged under 14, 7,027 people aged between 15 and 64, and 1,269 people aged over 65.

== See also ==
- List of township-level divisions of Hebei
