= Shifeng Bridge =

Cable-stayed bridge in Beijing, China

Coordinates: 39.879255°N 116.201953°E

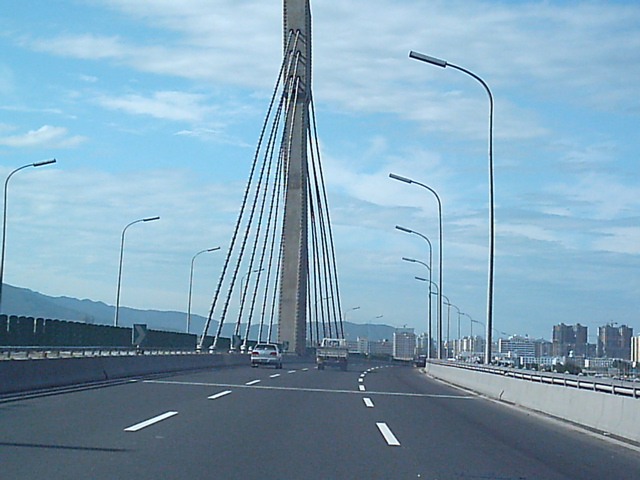
Shifeng Bridge on the Western 5th Ring Road (July 2004)

Shifeng Bridge (simplified Chinese: 石丰桥; traditional Chinese: 石豐橋; pinyin: Shífēng Qiáo) is a cable-stayed bridge on Beijing's western 5th Ring Road. It is near Wanping, near the Marco Polo Bridge. About 1.4 km long.

Under the bridge runs many railways to other parts of China.

The bridge is so named because it crosses from Shijingshan District into Fengtai District. ("Shi" stands for "石" and "Feng" stands for "丰".)

Shifeng Bridge is well illuminated at night.
