= Chuaihuatuan =

Chuaihuatuan 揣骨疃镇
- Town
- Chuăigútuăn Zhèn
- Location in Hebei Location in China
- Coordinates: 40°01′45″N 114°14′51″E
- Country: People's Republic of China
- Province: Hebei
- Prefecture-level city: Zhangjiakou
- County: Yangyuan

Area
  - Total: 288.8 km^{2} (111.5 sq mi)

Population (2010)
  - Total: 21,946
  - Density: 75.99/km^{2} (196.8/sq mi)
- Time zone: UTC+8 (China Standard)

Chuaihuatuan (Chinese: 揣骨疃镇; pinyin: Chuăigútuăn Zhèn) is a town located in Yangyuan County, Zhangjiakou, Hebei, China. According to the 2010 census, Chuaihuatuan had a population of 21,946, including 11,222 males and 10,724 females. The population was distributed as follows: 3,963 people aged under 14, 15,327 people aged between 15 and 64, and 2,656 people aged over 65.

== See also ==
- List of township-level divisions of Hebei
