= Dongfangchengbao Township =

Dongfangchengbao Township 东坊城堡乡
- Rural Township
- Dōngfāng Chéngbăo Xiāng
- Location in Hebei Location in China
- Coordinates: 40°07′33″N 114°13′03″E
- Country: People's Republic of China
- Province: Hebei
- Prefecture-level city: Zhangjiakou
- County: Yangyuan

Area
  - Total: 114.0 km^{2} (44.0 sq mi)

Population (2010)
  - Total: 7,827
  - Density: 68.63/km^{2} (177.8/sq mi)
- Time zone: UTC+8 (China Standard)

Dongfangchengbao Township (Chinese: 东坊城堡乡; pinyin: Dōngfāng Chéngbăo Xiāng) is a rural township located in Yangyuan County, Zhangjiakou, Hebei, China. According to the 2010 census, Dongfangchengbao Township had a population of 7,827, including 3,986 males and 3,841 females. The population was distributed as follows: 1,231 people aged under 14, 5,527 people aged between 15 and 64, and 1,069 people aged over 65.

== See also ==
- List of township-level divisions of Hebei
