= Yangyuan County =

Yangyuan County 阳原县
- County
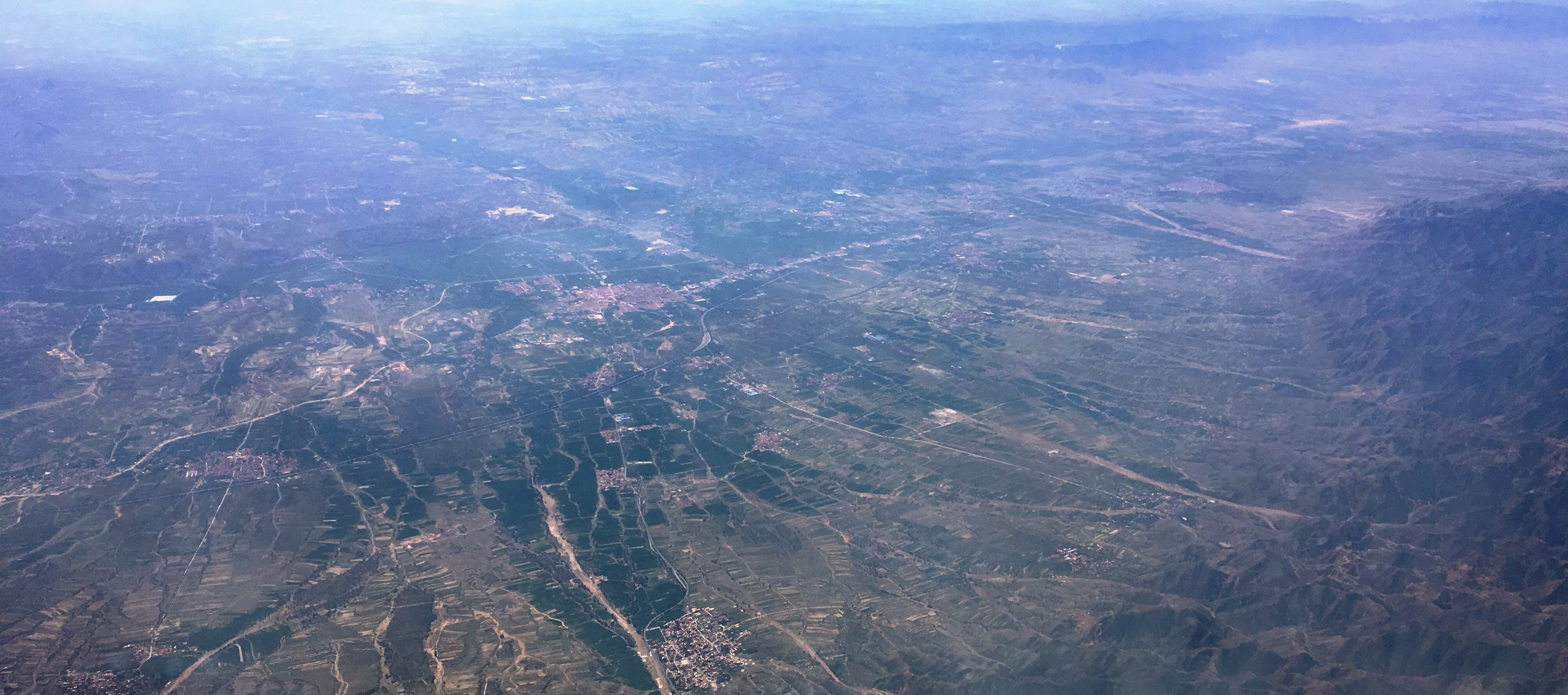
- Aerial view of Sanggan River Valley in Yangyuan

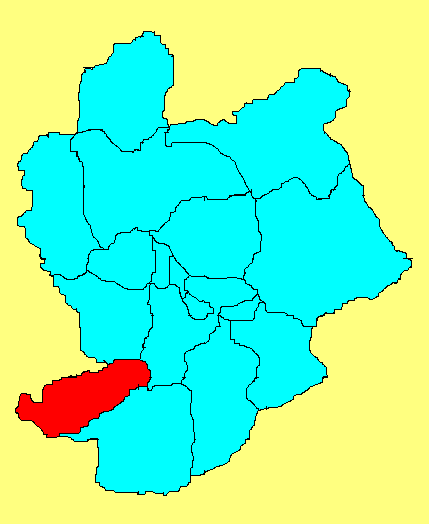
- Location in Zhangjiakou

- Location of the seat in Hebei
- Coordinates: 40°07′N 114°10′E
- Country: People's Republic of China
- Province: Hebei
- Prefecture-level city: Zhangjiakou
- Time zone: UTC+8 (China Standard)

Yangyuan County
- Simplified Chinese: 阳原县
- Traditional Chinese: 陽原縣
- Literal meaning: Sunny Plain County; Yang Plain County
Transcriptions
Standard Mandarin
- Hanyu Pinyin: Yángyuán Xiàn
- Wade–Giles: Yang-yüan Hsien

Yangyuan County is a county in Zhangjiakou Prefecture, Hebei Province, China.

== Geography ==
Yangyuan is bounded by Huai'an County to the north, Xuanhua County to the east, Yu County to the south, and by Datong municipality in Shanxi Province to the north and west.

== Climate ==
Climate data for Yangyuan, elevation 938 m (3,077 ft), (1991–2020 normals, extremes 1981–2010)
Month	Jan	Feb	Mar	Apr	May	Jun	Jul	Aug	Sep	Oct	Nov	Dec	Year
Record high °C (°F)	9.4 (48.9)	17.8 (64.0)	25.8 (78.4)	35.5 (95.9)	35.0 (95.0)	39.4 (102.9)	40.6 (105.1)	36.2 (97.2)	35.4 (95.7)	27.7 (81.9)	21.9 (71.4)	14.9 (58.8)	40.6 (105.1)
Mean daily maximum °C (°F)	−2.4 (27.7)	2.7 (36.9)	10.1 (50.2)	18.4 (65.1)	24.7 (76.5)	28.7 (83.7)	30.0 (86.0)	28.3 (82.9)	23.5 (74.3)	16.1 (61.0)	6.7 (44.1)	−0.9 (30.4)	15.5 (59.9)
Daily mean °C (°F)	−9.6 (14.7)	−4.9 (23.2)	2.6 (36.7)	10.9 (51.6)	17.6 (63.7)	21.9 (71.4)	23.7 (74.7)	22.0 (71.6)	16.4 (61.5)	8.8 (47.8)	−0.2 (31.6)	−7.4 (18.7)	8.5 (47.3)
Mean daily minimum °C (°F)	−15.3 (4.5)	−11.0 (12.2)	−4.2 (24.4)	3.5 (38.3)	10.2 (50.4)	15.2 (59.4)	18.0 (64.4)	16.3 (61.3)	10.1 (50.2)	2.7 (36.9)	−5.5 (22.1)	−12.5 (9.5)	2.3 (36.1)
Record low °C (°F)	−29.9 (−21.8)	−25.9 (−14.6)	−22.4 (−8.3)	−10.9 (12.4)	−3.5 (25.7)	5.7 (42.3)	10.8 (51.4)	8.5 (47.3)	−0.3 (31.5)	−7.3 (18.9)	−20.6 (−5.1)	−29.0 (−20.2)	−29.9 (−21.8)
Average precipitation mm (inches)	2.3 (0.09)	3.3 (0.13)	8.4 (0.33)	18.6 (0.73)	38.0 (1.50)	50.2 (1.98)	94.2 (3.71)	75.5 (2.97)	50.6 (1.99)	22.3 (0.88)	8.9 (0.35)	1.8 (0.07)	374.1 (14.73)
Average precipitation days (≥ 0.1 mm)	2.3	2.5	4.0	5.1	7.5	10.6	13.0	11.3	8.8	5.9	3.3	1.9	76.2
Average snowy days	3.0	3.8	3.3	1.2	0	0	0	0	0	0.4	3.1	2.7	17.5
Average relative humidity (%)	48	41	37	36	39	50	62	65	61	54	51	48	49
Mean monthly sunshine hours	199.9	202.6	244.6	260.9	281.5	263.4	257.4	257.6	235.2	230.0	197.6	192.9	2,823.6
Percentage possible sunshine	66	67	66	65	63	59	57	61	64	68	67	67	64
Source: China Meteorological Administration

== History ==
Under the Han, Yangyuan County was part of Dai Commandery.

== Administration ==
Yangyuan runs 5 towns (zhen, 镇) and 9 townships (xiang, 乡). The county executive, legislature and judiciary are in Xicheng Town, together with the CPC and PSB branches.

=== Towns ===
- Xicheng (西城镇)
- Dongcheng (东城镇)
- Huashaoying (化稍营镇)
- Chuaihuatuan (揣骨疃镇)
- Dongjingji (东井集镇)

=== Townships ===
- Yaojiazhuang (要家庄乡)
- Dongfangchengbao (东坊城堡乡)
- Jing'ergou (井儿沟乡)
- Sanmafang (三马坊乡)
- Gaoqiang (高墙乡)
- Datianwa (大田洼乡)
- Xinbu (辛堡乡)
- Majuanbu (马圈堡乡)
- Futujiang (浮图讲乡)
