= Wenming East Road Tunnel =

Road tunnel in Hainan, China

Overview
- Location: Hainan, China
- Start: Haikou
- End: Wenchang (refers to the large area east of Haikou, known as a county-level city)

Operation
- Opened: August 2020
- Traffic: automotive

Technical
- No. of lanes: 6
- Operating speed: 60 km/h (37 mph)

The Wenming East Road Tunnel (Chinese: 文明东越江通道) is an underwater tunnel crossing the Nandu River, Haikou, Hainan, China. The tunnel is 2.7 km long and connects Haikou city with the east side of the Nandu River. This links the city with Jiangdong New Area to the east, as well as easing traffic on the Qiongzhou Bridge just south of the tunnel.

The tunnel has a total length of 4,380 metres. The actual underground part, a 6-lane dual carriageway, is 2,720 metres long. The maximum depth is 23 metres. The speed limit within the tunnel is 60km/h with reduced 40km/h portions at junctions. There are two entrances on the west side and one on the east, all with a white, clam shell style.

The Wenming East Road Tunnel opened in August 2020 and is Hainan's first river-crossing tunnel, and the first tunnel built under the Nandu River. Construction took one year and eight months using a cofferdam system.
