= Jiangdong New Area =

Jiangdong New Area 江东新区
- Industrial park
- Country: People's Republic of China
- Province: Hainan
- Time zone: UTC+8 (China standard time)

Jiangdong New Area (江东新区) is located about 5 km east of Haikou, Hainan Province, China. Established in 2018, this large industrial park extends about 20 km from north to south and about 8 km wide, from the Nandu River at the west to the east coast of Hainan. The entire area includes wetlands, and areas mostly yet to be developed.

However, the developed part, as of 2026, runs along the northeast coast of Hainan, and measures about 4 km long and .5 km wide. It contains dozens of new buildings, nearing completion, and the large, private Harrow School.
