= Xiaoyue Tunnel =

Tunnel in Beijing, China

Coordinates: 39.8506°N 116.2214°E

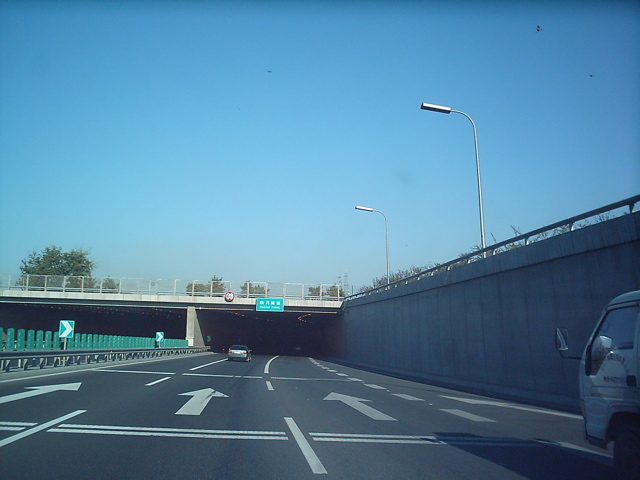
The southern entrance to the Xiaoyue expressway tunnel

The Xiaoyue Tunnel (simplified Chinese: 晓月隧道; traditional Chinese: 曉月隧道; pinyin: Xiǎoyuè Suìdào) is an expressway tunnel in Beijing, China, and forms part of the Western 5th Ring Road.
