= Beiyuan Subdistrict, Beijing =

Beiyuan Subdistrict 北苑街道
- Subdistrict
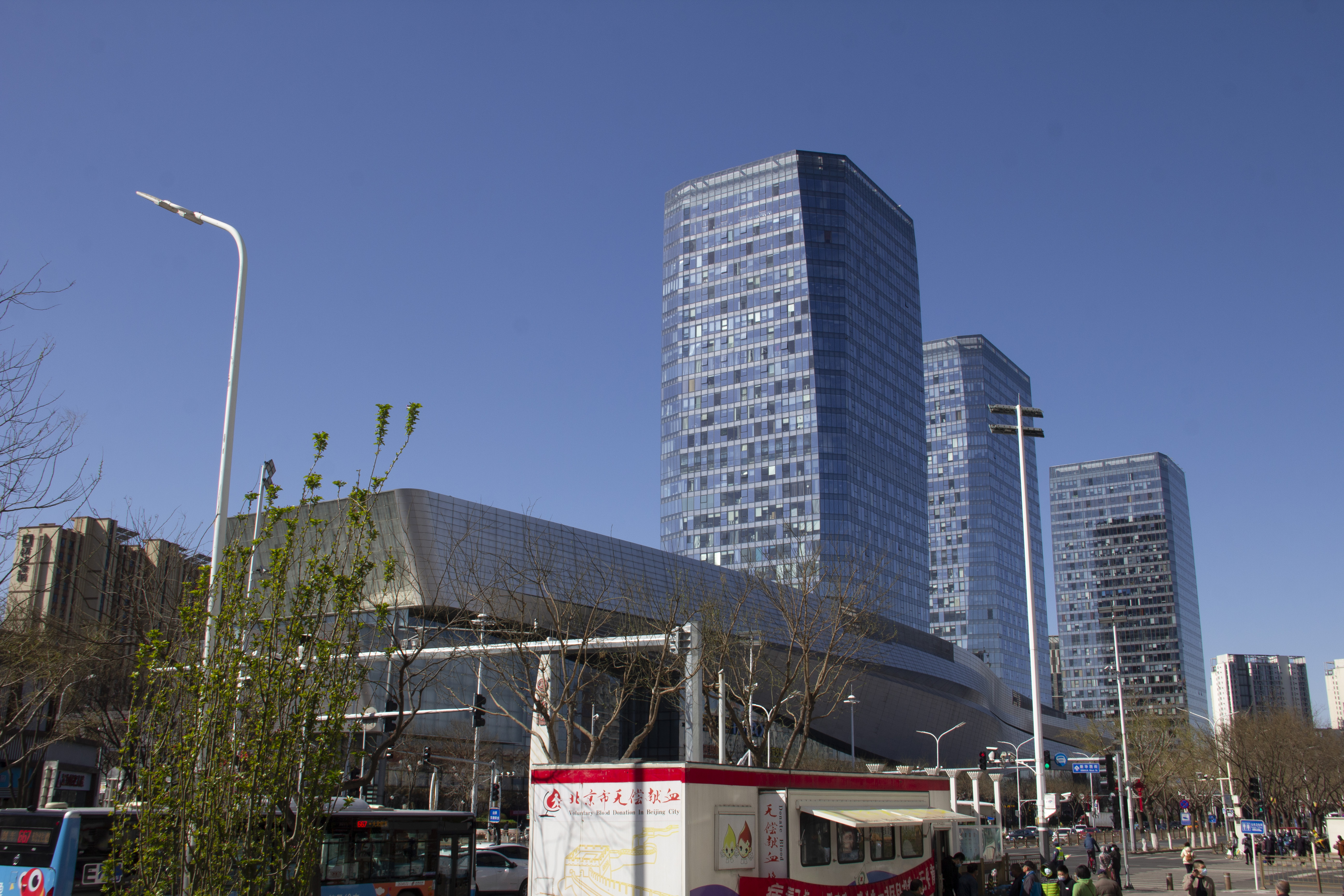
- Tongzhou Wanda Plaza inside of Beiyuan, 2020

- Location within Beijing Location within China
- Coordinates: 39°54′08″N 116°38′37″E
- Country: China
- Municipality: Beijing
- District: Tongzhou
- Village-level Divisions: 13 communities

Area
  - Total: 6.81 km^{2} (2.63 sq mi)

Population (2020)
  - Total: 108,840
  - Density: 16,000/km^{2} (41,400/sq mi)
- Time zone: UTC+8 (China Standard)
- Postal code: 101100
- Area code: 010

Beiyuan Subdistrict (Chinese: 北苑街道; pinyin: Běiyuàn jiēdaò) is a subdistrict of Beijing and is located in Tongzhou District. It covers an area of 8.7 square kilometers and is home to 108,840 residents as of 2020. Its floating population is estimated to be 6 million.

The subdistrict took its name from a corrupted form of Beiyuan (Chinese: 北园; pinyin: Běiyuán; lit. 'North Manor'), an estate owned by Qing dynasty officials in charge of transporting grains through the Grand Canal.

== History ==
- 1948: 4 townships of Tongxian were combined into Tongzhou City
- 1950: Tongzhou City became a county-administered town
- 1997: Tongzhou Town was disbanded, and Xicheng Subdistrict was incorporated into Beiyuan Subdistrict.

== Administrative divisions ==
As of 2021, the subdistrict is divided into the following 13 communities:

| Administrative division code | Subdivision names | Name transliteration |
|---|---|---|
| 110112003001 | 新华西街 | Xinhuaxi Jie |
| 110112003002 | 中山街 | Zhongshan Jie |
| 110112003003 | 复兴南里 | Fuxing Nanli |
| 110112003004 | 北苑桥 | Beiyuanqiao |
| 110112003005 | 后南仓 | Hounancang |
| 110112003007 | 新城南街 | Xincheng Nanjie |
| 110112003009 | 帅府 | Shuaifu |
| 110112003011 | 玉带路 | Yudailu |
| 110112003012 | 西关 | Xiguan |
| 110112003014 | 长桥园 | Changqiaoyuan |
| 110112003016 | 果园西 | Guoyuanxi |
| 110112003018 | 滨惠南三街 | Binhuinan Sanjie |
| 110112003022 | 官园 | Guanyuan |

== Transportation ==
Beijing Bus lines 415,426, 430, 464, 466, 479, 484, 558, 569, 596, 617, 620, 629, 653, 695, 751, 758, 984, 985, Yuntong 117, T11 and Night 215 have stops within Beiyuan. Most of these lines can be taken to get from or to Beijing city proper.

== Gallery ==
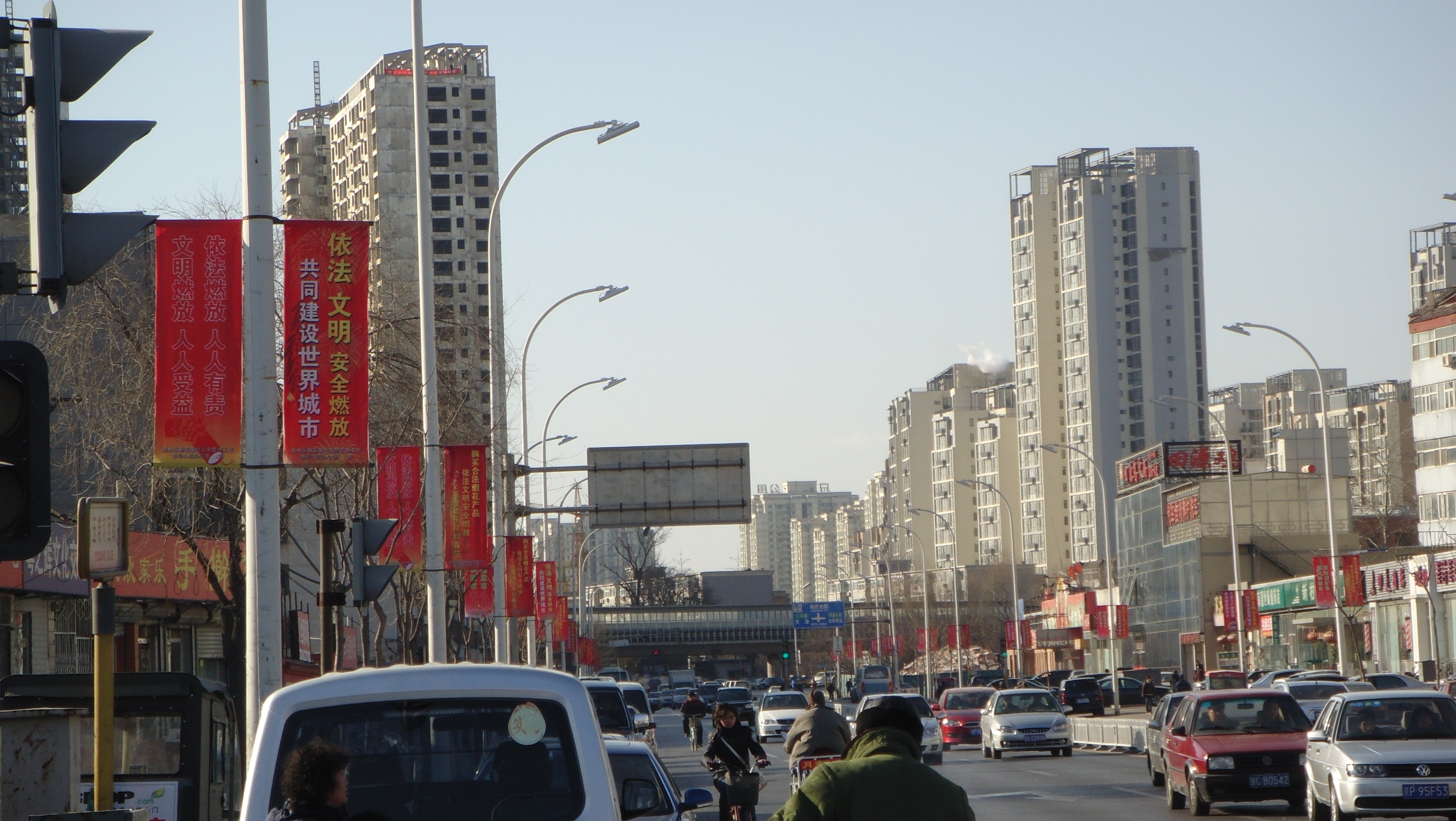
Yudaihe West Street, 2011

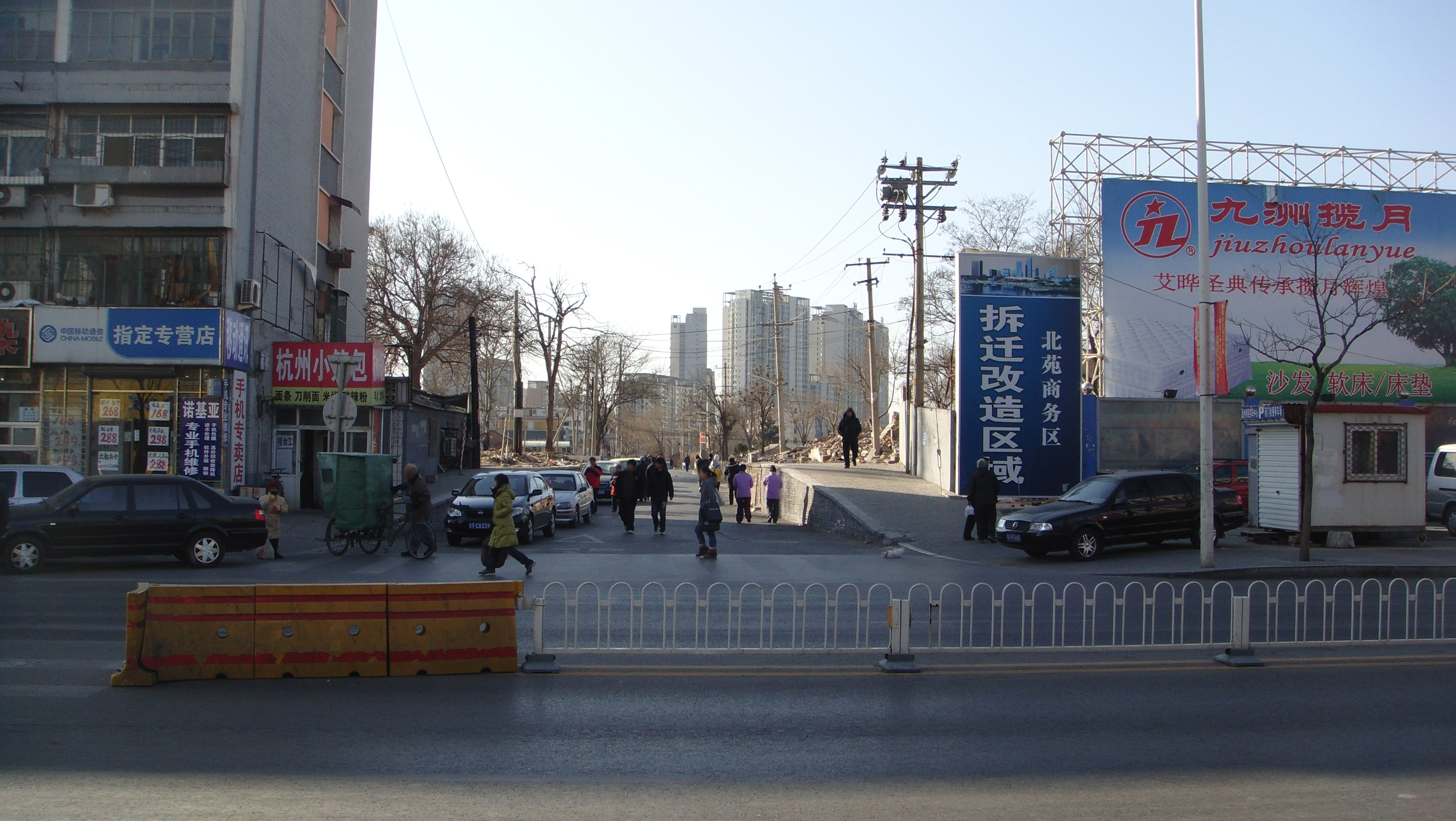
An intersection at Tonghui South Road, 2011

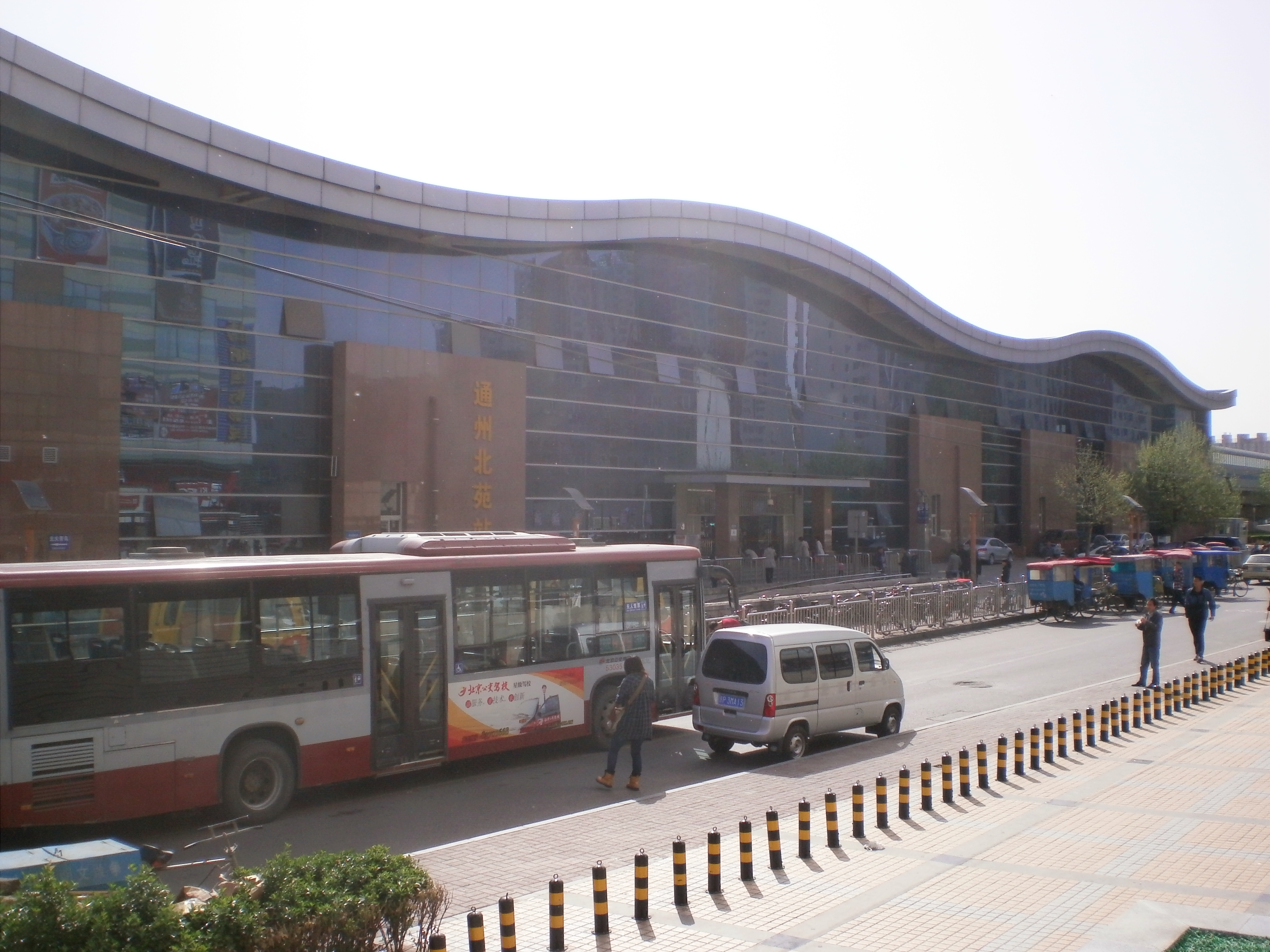
Tongzhou Beiyuan Station, 2012

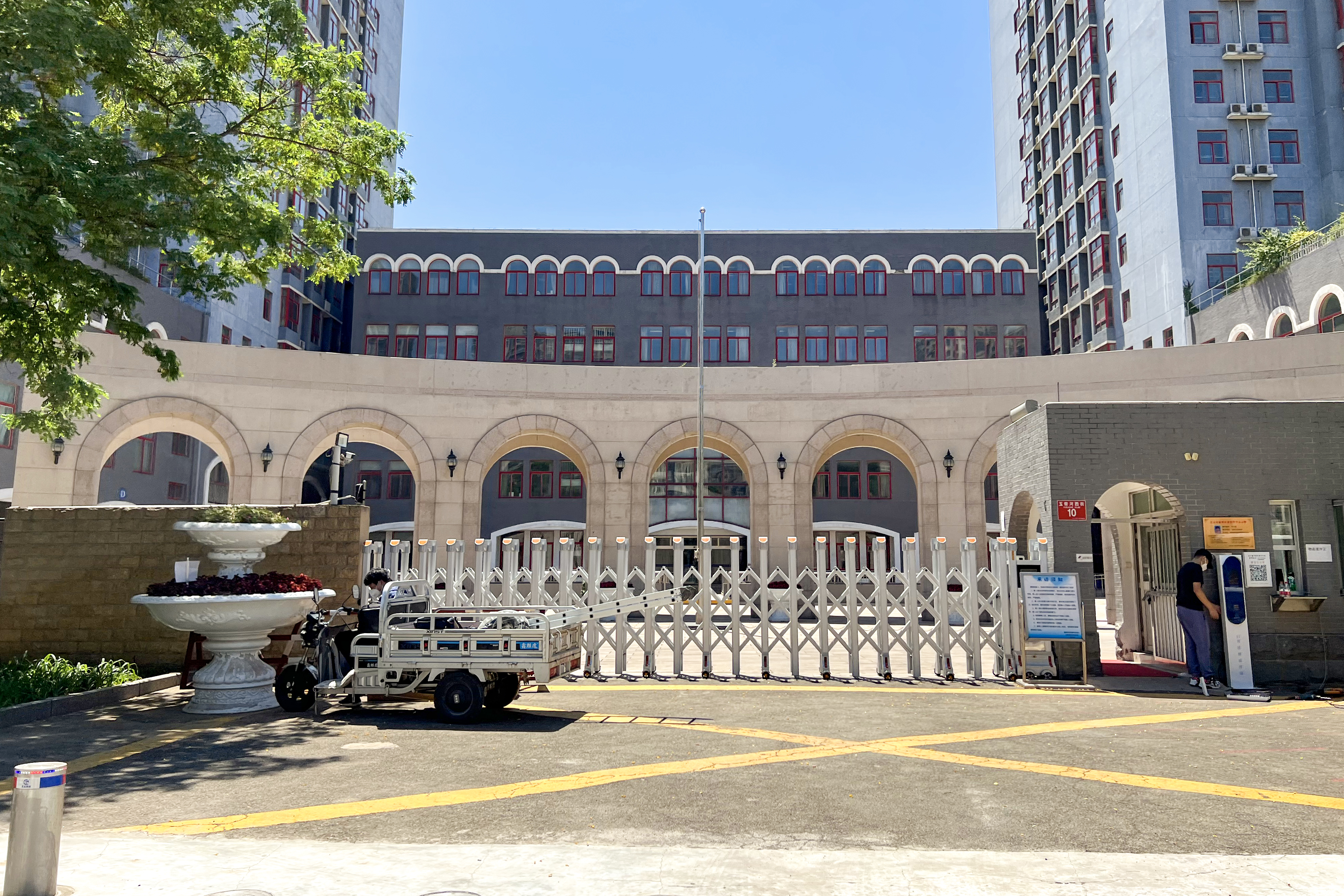
Beijing Luhe International Academy, 2022

== See also ==
- List of township-level divisions of Beijing
