= Baige =

Long distance horse race in Kazakhstan

A baige (Kazakh: Бәйге) is an ancient long-distance horse race (5–50 km) popular among many Turkic peoples. Its appearance is connected with the nomadic way of life and the necessity of training horses for long moves. Nowadays it is held in stadiums throughout Kazakhstan.

== Types of baige ==
=== Alaman baige ===
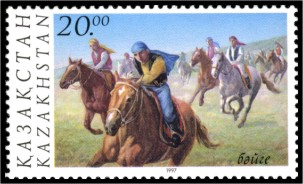
Kazakh postage stamp “Baige”, 1997

The Alaman baige is a rugged-terrain race over long and extra-long distances of up to 100 km. Being the most prestigious and difficult baige, it is often the main attraction of large national festivals and funerals. Contests are held on the steppe on roads filled with natural obstacles or in stadiums. The number of participating horses is unlimited and there are no restrictions as to what breeds can participate. Riders are typically 14-year-old boys who are experienced horsemen. Only mature horses of 3 years and up can participate in the Alaman Baige. There are no set standards of distance for the race. In Kazakhstan the race is usually 21 or 31 km, but races of 50 and 100 km are also occasionally held. Only specially prepared racers participate in this type of baige. Purebred horses of rare breeds such as the Thoroughbed, Arabian, and Akhal-Teke are excluded from the race due to their lack of endurance, high price, and other factors.

=== Kunan baige ===
The Kunan baige is an 11 km race of yearlings (young two-year-old horses). Horses are ridden bareback by children 7–8 years of age. Races are held before the Alaman baige. Racehorses are appraised for more serious future contests.

Officially in Kazakhstan races are held several times a year at the Alaman Stadium in the village of Kokbastau, the Taldykorgan Stadium in Taldykorgan, and at other stadiums across Kazakhstan. Informal baiges are often organized as part of large national festivals, celebrations, and death-anniversaries.
