= Kangzhuang, Beijing =

Kangzhuang Town 康庄镇
- Town
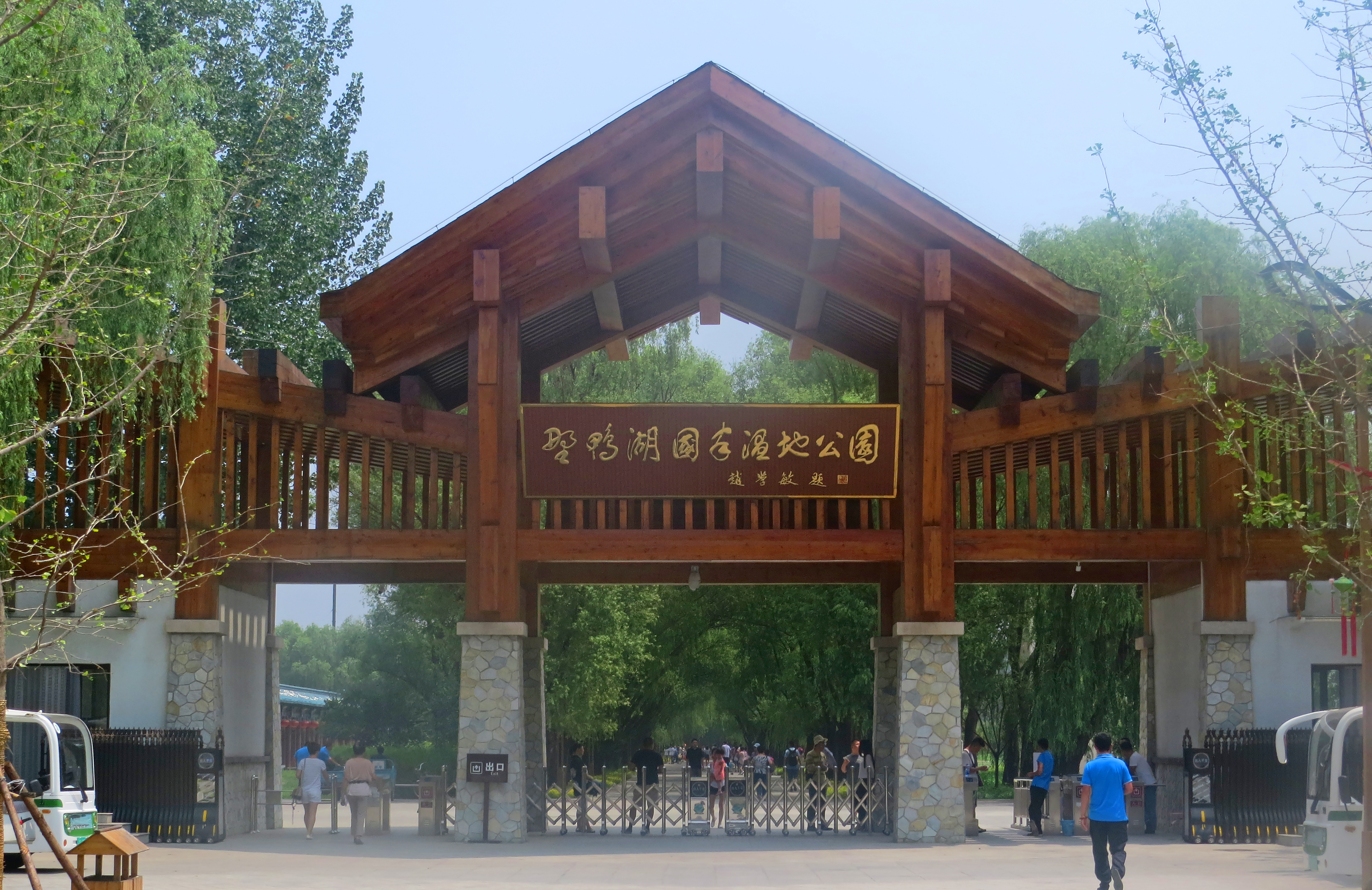
- Yeya Lake National Wetland Park, 2016

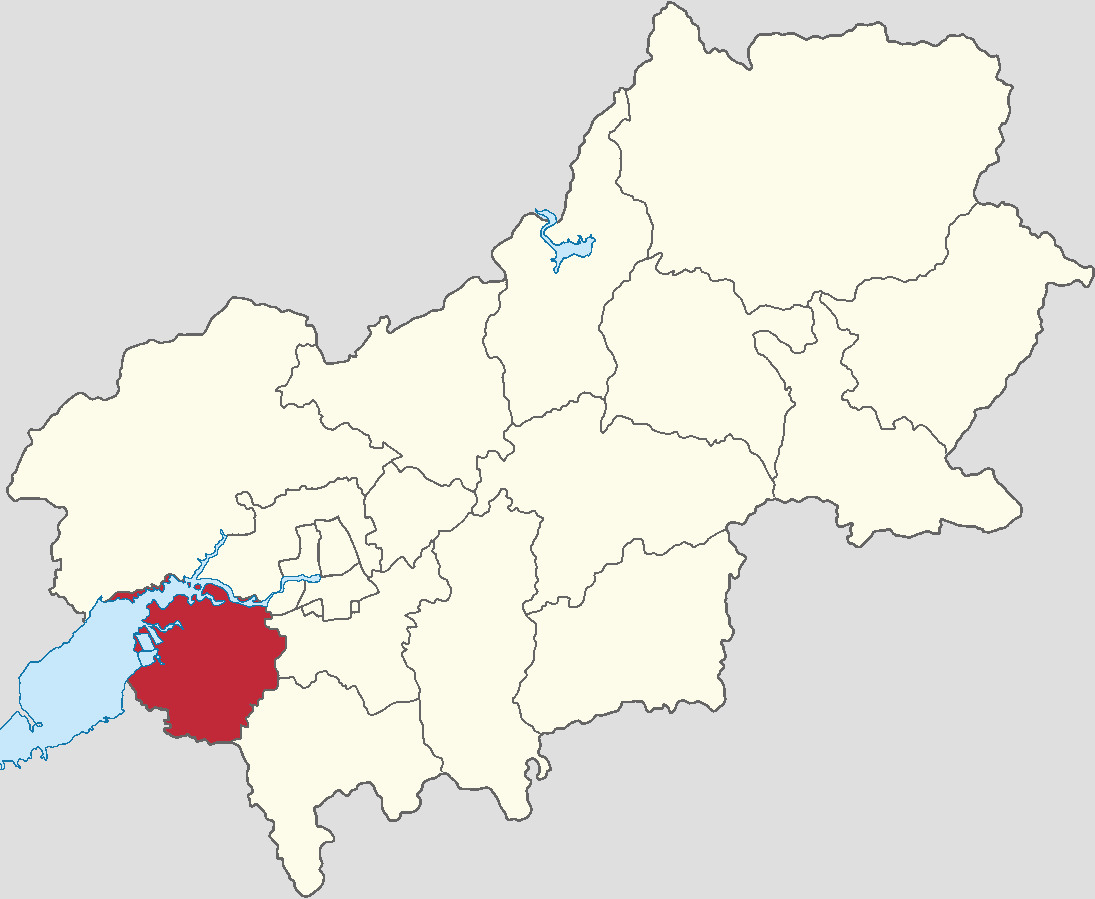
- Location of Kangzhuang Town in Yanqing District

- Location within Beijing Location within China
- Coordinates: 40°22′53″N 115°53′39″E
- Country: China
- Municipality: Beijing
- District: Yanqing
- Village-level Divisions: 3 communities 31 villages

Area
  - Total: 94.41 km^{2} (36.45 sq mi)
- Elevation: 507 m (1,663 ft)

Population (2020)
  - Total: 32,815
  - Density: 347.6/km^{2} (900.2/sq mi)
- Time zone: UTC+8 (China Standard)
- Postal code: 102101
- Area code: 010

Kangzhuang Town (simplified Chinese: 康庄镇; traditional Chinese: 康莊鎮; pinyin: Kāngzhuāng Zhèn) is a town in the Yanqing District of Beijing. It borders Zhangshanying and Yanqing Towns to its north, Dayushu Town to its east, Badaling Town to its southeast, Donghuayuan and Xiaonanxinbao Towns to its southwest, and has several pieces of lands north of the Guishui River. The census had counted 32,815 residents for this town in 2020.

It is named Kangzhuang (Chinese: 康庄; lit. 'Kang's Villa') because Kang was the most popular surname in the region during the founding of the settlement in 1593.

== Geography ==
Kangzhuang is located on the eastern portion of Yanhuai Basin, and on the southern bank of Guishui River. Beijing–Baotou railway and Kangzhuang-Yanqing Railway pass through the town.

== History ==
Timetable of Kangzhuang Town
Year	Status	Belong to
1940 - 1945	8th District	Changyan United County, Chahar
1945 - 1948	Kangzhuang Special District	Jinchaji Border District
1948 - 1949	Kangzhuang Special District	Yanqing County, Chahar
1949 - 1952	Kangzhuang District	Yanqing County, Chahar
1952 - 1956	Kangzhuang District	Yanqing County, Hebei
1956 - 1958	Kangzhuang Town	Yanqing County, Hebei
1958 - 1961	Kangzhuang Production Team, under Yanqing People's Commune	Yanqing County, Beijing
1961 - 1983	Kangzhuang People's Commune	Yanqing County, Beijing
1983 - 1990	Kangzhuang Township	Yanqing County, Beijing
1990 - 2015	Kangzhuang Town	Yanqing County, Beijing
2015–present	Kangzhuang Town	Yanqing District, Beijing

== Administrative divisions ==
By 2021, Kangzhuang Town comprised 34 subdivisions, with 3 communities and 31 villages. Here is a table listing all the subdivisions:

Subdivision names	Name transliterations	Type
康庄镇	Kangzhuangzhen	Community
望都佳园	Wangdu Jiayuan	Community
北玻嘉园	Beibo Jiayuan	Community
榆林堡	Yulinpu	Village
一街	Yijie	Village
二街	Erjie	Village
三街	Sanjie	Village
四街	Sijie	Village
刁千营	Diaoqianying	Village
马坊	Mafang	Village
西桑园	Xisangyuan	Village
西红寺	Xihongsi	Village
郭家堡	Guojiapu	Village
小北堡	Xiaobeipu	Village
大丰营	Dafengying	Village
大营	Daying	Village
火烧营	Huoshaoying	Village
太平庄	Taipingzhuang	Village
张老营	Zhanglaoying	Village
许家营	Xulaoying	Village
马营	Maying	Village
苗家堡	Miaojiapu	Village
刘浩营	Liuhaoying	Village
屯军营	Tunjunying	Village
小曹营	Xiaocaoying	Village
大王庄	Dawangzhuang	Village
北曹营	Bei Caoying	Village
南曹营	Nan Caoying	Village
小王庄	Xiaowangzhuang	Village
小丰营	Xiaofengying	Village
东红寺	Donghongsi	Village
王家堡	Wangjiapu	Village
东官坊	Dongguanfang	Village
大路	Dalu	Village

== See also ==
- List of township-level divisions of Beijing
