= Dayushu, Beijing =

Dayushu Town 大榆树镇
- Town
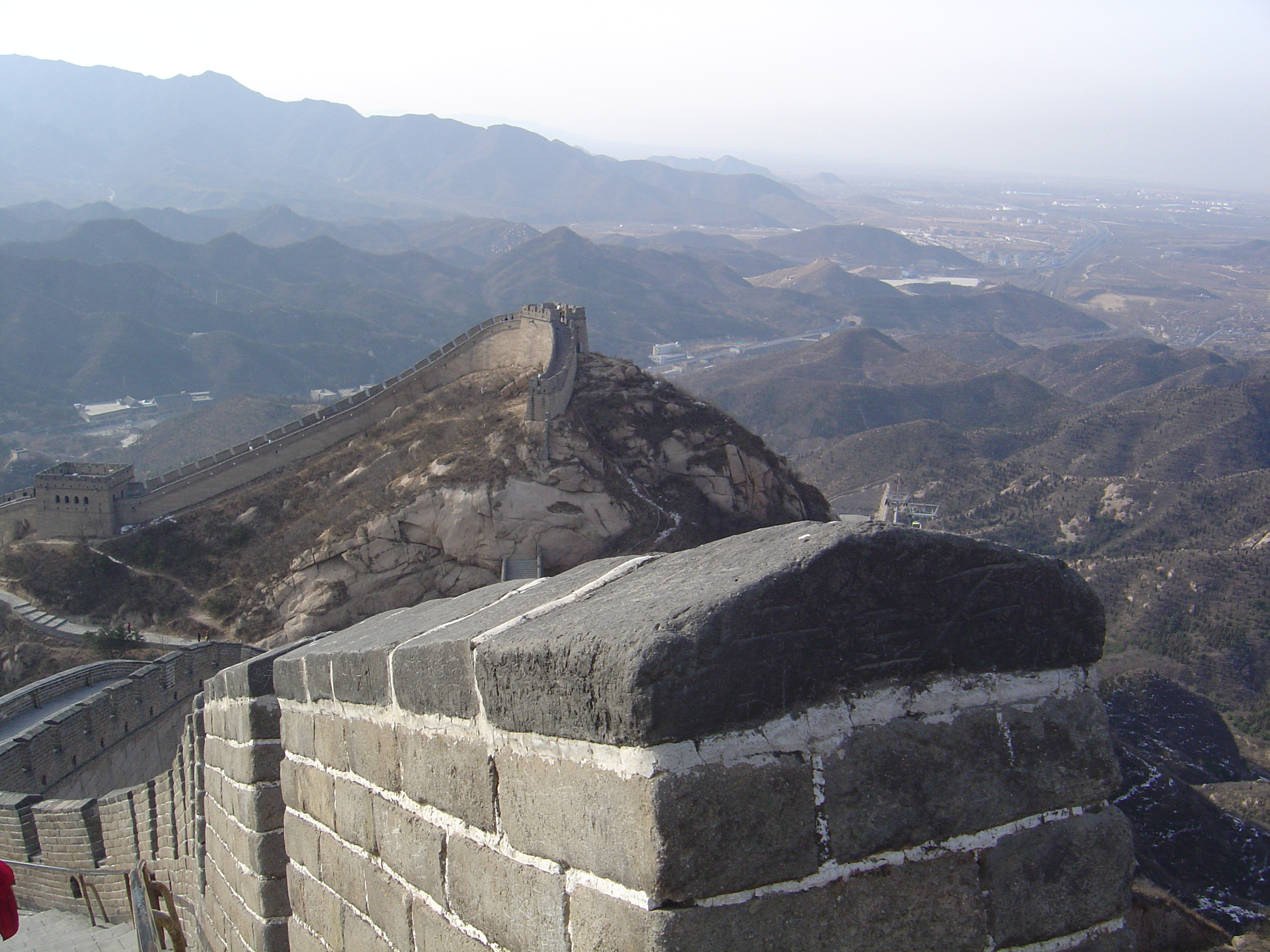
- Section of the Great Wall south of Xiao Zhangjiakou Village, 2004

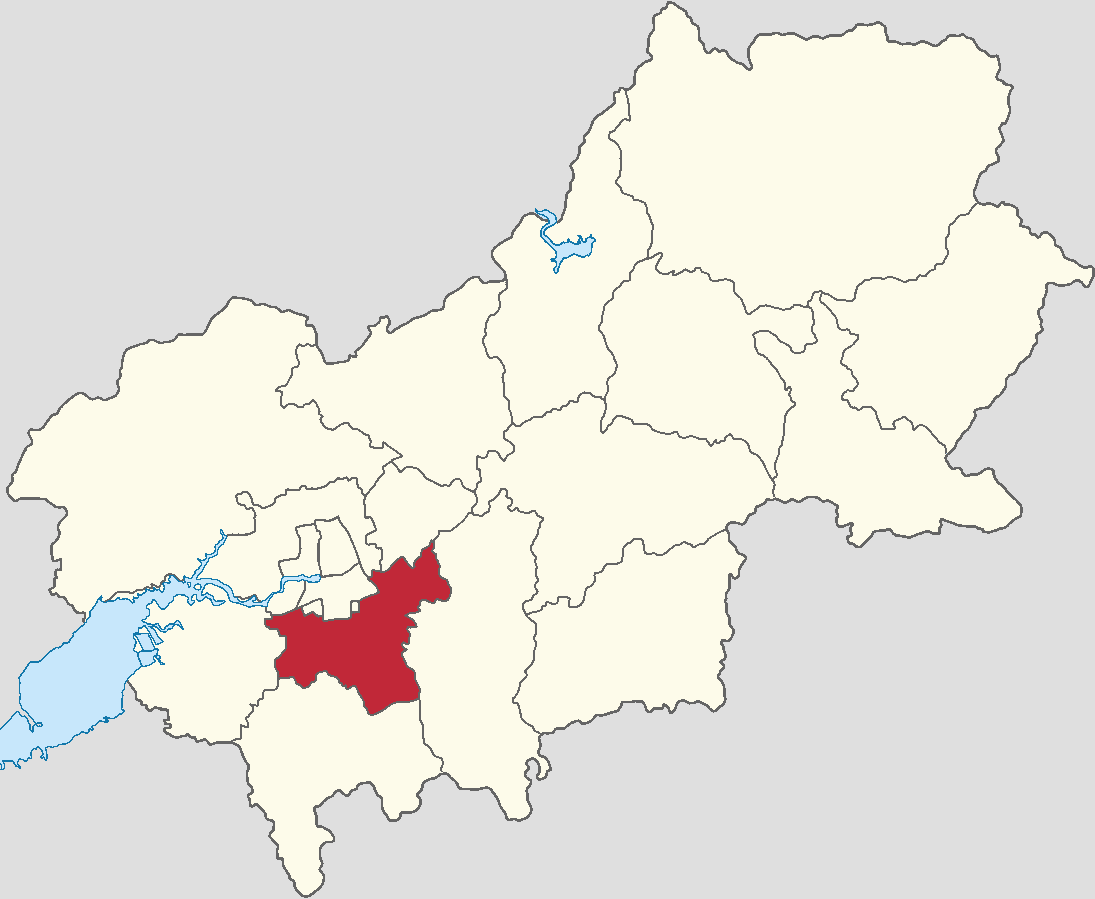
- Location within Yanqing District

- Location within Beijing Location within China
- Coordinates: 40°26′09″N 116°01′20″E
- Country: China
- Municipality: Beijing
- District: Yanqing
- Village-level Divisions: 1 community 25 villages

Area
  - Total: 60.1 km^{2} (23.2 sq mi)
- Elevation: 516 m (1,693 ft)

Population (2020)
  - Total: 16,166
  - Density: 269/km^{2} (697/sq mi)
- Time zone: UTC+8 (China Standard)
- Postal code: 102103
- Area code: 010

Dayushu Town (simplified Chinese: 大榆树镇; traditional Chinese: 大榆樹鎮; pinyin: Dàyúshù Zhèn) is a town in the Yanqing District of Beijing. It borders Baiquan Subdistrict, Yanqing and Shenjiaying Towns to the north, Jingzhuang Town to the east, Badaling Town to the south, and Kangzhuang Town to the west. In the year 2020, it had a population of 16,166.

The name Dayushu (Chinese: 大榆树; pinyin: Great Elm) comes from a large elm tree that used to exist within the region during the Ming dynasty.

== Geography ==
Dayushu Town is located on the foothill of Yan Mountain Range. Datong–Qinhuangdao railway, National Highway 110 and Beijing–Ürümqi Expressway traverse through the town.

== History ==
Timeline of Dayushu Town
Time	Status	Part of
1948 - 1952	1st District	Yanqing County, Chahar
1952 - 1953	1st District	Yanqing County, Hebei
1953 - 1956	Jiangjiatai Township Yanghuzhuang Township	Yanqing County, Hebei
1956 - 1958	Dayushu Township Xiatun Township	Yanqing County, Hebei
1958 - 1961	Dayushu Production Team Xiatun Production Team, both within Dengta People's Commune	Yanqing County, Beijing
1961 - 1966	Dayushu People's Commune Xiatun People's Commune	Yanqing County, Beijing
1966 - 1981	Gaomiaotun People's Commune Xiatun People's Commune	Yanqing County, Beijing
1981 - 1983	Dayushu People's Commune Xiatun People's Commune	Yanqing County, Beijing
1983 - 2000	Dayushu Township Xiatun Township	Yanqing County, Beijing
2000 - 2015	Dayushu Town	Yanqing County, Beijing
2015–present	Dayushu Town	Yanqing District, Beijing

== Administrative divisions ==
At the time of writing, Dayushu Town consists of 26 subdivisions, including these 1 communities and 25 villages:

Subdivision names	Name transliterations	Type
大榆树镇	Dayushuzhen	Community
姜家台	Jiangjiatai	Village
陈家营	Chenjiaying	Village
杨户庄	Yanghuzhuang	Village
阜高营	Fugaoying	Village
奚官营	Xiguanying	Village
下辛庄	Xia Xinzhuang	Village
上辛庄	Shang Xinzhuang	Village
宗家营	Zongjiaying	Village
大榆树	Dayushu	Village
高庙屯	Gaomiaotun	Village
刘家堡	Liujiapu	Village
北红门	Bei Hongmen	Village
南红门	Nan Hongmen	Village
东桑园	Dong Sangyuan	Village
大泥河	Da Nihe	Village
小泥河	Xiao Nihe	Village
小张家口	Xiao Zhangjiakou	Village
下屯	Xiatun	Village
东杏园	Dong Xingyuan	Village
西杏园	Xi Xingyuan	Village
岳家营	Yuejiaying	Village
簸箕营	Bojiying	Village
新宝庄	Xinbaozhuang	Village
程家营	Chengjiaying	Village
军营	Junying	Village

== See also ==
- List of township-level divisions of Beijing
