= Zhangbei =

Zhangbei may refer to:

- Zhangbei (town), the county seat of Zhangbei County, Hebei, China
- Zhangbei County, a county in Hebei, China
