= Erquanjing Township =

Erquanjing Township 二泉井乡
- Rural Township
- Èrquánjĭng Xiāng
- Location in Hebei Location in China
- Coordinates: 41°23′59″N 114°40′32″E
- Country: People's Republic of China
- Province: Hebei
- Prefecture-level city: Zhangjiakou
- County: Zhangbei

Area
  - Total: 227.0 km^{2} (87.6 sq mi)

Population (2010)
  - Total: 11,531
  - Density: 50.81/km^{2} (131.6/sq mi)
- Time zone: UTC+8 (China Standard)

Erquanjing Township (Chinese: 二泉井乡; pinyin: Èrquánjĭng Xiāng) is a rural township located in Zhangbei County, Zhangjiakou, Hebei, China. According to the 2010 census, Erquanjing Township had a population of 11,531, including 5,941 males and 5,590 females. The population was distributed as follows: 1,671 people aged under 14, 8,052 people aged between 15 and 64, and 1,808 people aged over 65.

== See also ==
- List of township-level divisions of Hebei
