= Chengzhen Subdistrict =

Chengzhen Subdistrict 城镇街道
- Urban Subdistrict
- Chéngzhèn Jiēdào
- Location in Hebei Location in China
- Coordinates: 40°29′00″N 115°16′46″E
- Country: People's Republic of China
- Province: Hebei
- Prefecture-level city: Zhangjiakou
- District: Xiahuayuan

Area
  - Total: 10.60 km^{2} (4.09 sq mi)

Population (2010)
  - Total: 28,536
- Time zone: UTC+8 (China Standard)

Chengzhen Subdistrict (Chinese: 城镇街道; pinyin: Chéngzhèn Jiēdào) is an urban subdistrict located in Xiahuayuan District, Zhangjiakou, Hebei, China. According to the 2010 census, Chengzhen Subdistrict had a population of 28,536, including 14,412 males and 14,124 females. The population was distributed as follows: 3,355 people aged under 14, 22,024 people aged between 15 and 64, and 3,157 people aged over 65.

== See also ==
- List of township-level divisions of Hebei
