= Grass Skyline =

Scenic road in Zhangbei County, Hebei, China

The Grass Skyline is a 133-kilometre (83 mi) scenic road in Zhangbei County, Hebei, China. It was paved in 2012 and a toll was imposed in 2016. In 2015 three tourist service centres were established on the road along with 23 car parks and 41 public toilets, and in that year it was visited by 330,000 people. The Grass Skyline is a highway in China, which is famous for its amazing scene.It is also known as China's Route 66.It is located at the junction of zhangbei county and chongli county, between chongli ski area and zhangbei grassland scenic spot is also one of the most beautiful roads in mainland China.

== Highway ==
The Grass Skyline is a county road. The total length is about 132.7 km. Zhangjiakou City begun to build it at the end of 2011, which cost about 320 million yuan, open to traffic in September 2012.

== Scenic spot ==
There are the ruins of the ancient Great Wall, Huapi ridge, Yehu ridge, Zhang Bei grassland, and many other cultural, ecological and geological tourism resources. It is at the edge of xilingol prairie, with an average elevation 1400 meters, average annual temperature is 4 degrees Celsius.

== Route ==
Shift from Beijing-Tibet expressway G6 to Zhangcheng high-speed G95 and go to the Huapiling high-speed toll station. Then, go down highway 242 Zhanghu line and turn left.

== Caution ==
1, Don't park your car at will, don't throw rubbish everywhere, don't trample crops and tree. 2, Don't barbecue and smoke in grassland. 3, When entering the village area, don't take pictures without allowance. 4, Remember to bring shirts and trousers, and pay attention to the cold weather and sun burning.

== Ticket ==
May 1, 2016, Zhangbei county government information disclosure platform Released the "Zhangbei County Price Bureau on the Grass Skyline Scenic Area ticket prices approved to determine the Grass Skyline Scenic Area began to collect tickets, ticket prices for 50 yuan / person. Zhangjiakou Zhangbei County Price Bureau in April 20, 2016 held a prairie Grass Skyline Scenic Area ticket price hearing. According to the relevant laws and regulations, in line with social benefits, the principle of appropriate compensation costs, the grassland days (in accordance with the relevant provisions of the laws and regulations, Grass Skyline ticket prices approved as follows: Tickets for the 50 yuan / person. Reporters from the May 1 Prairie Grass Skyline Scenic Spot Management Office posted fees to see the elderly over the age of 65, children under 1.2 meters, holding my military card, soldiers card, press card, tour card, the disabled card People, as well as grassland along the road in the production and living of villagers and enterprises and institutions to implement free of charge. In addition, holders of my student card can enjoy half price. The range of tickets collected covers all areas of "Grass Skyline", from west to east, across Shangyi, Wanquan, Zhangbei, Chongli, Guyuan five counties, a total length of more than 300 kilometers. (Currently only one 132.7 km was opened to traffic, two to be built). 50 tickets covering the two sections. June 19, 2015, Zhangjiakou price department held a 'Prairie Road' scenic ticket price hearing, "a full three hours, most of the hearing on behalf of the endorsement of the Charges, then made 80 yuan per person caused by the charging standard is not a small dispute, the price department said Grass Skyline charges suspended.

== Reason for Charges ==
First, the area carrying capacity is too low and the problem of serious overload, to drive as the main means of sightseeing is bound to bring a lot of vehicles, and had only three road grassland Grass Skyline, obviously difficult to carry such a large number of traffic, not only lead to a sense of ornamental Drop, but also makes frequent congestion.

Second, the lack of service facilities, Grass Skyline the current official service facilities is very small, mainly by private operators to provide, its quality of service facilities is not high, the number of small scenic spots is one of the main causes of serious pollution. Third, the area of service business operators are mainly local farmers, small businesses scattered situation is more prominent, the lack of unified planning and guidance, and even the starting price and kill people from the phenomenon, the lower the level of service and higher prices limit the scenic Further enhance the internal.

== Stop charging ==
Deep in the vortex of public opinion Zhang Bei Prairie Tin Road Scenic Area from May 1 this year, 50 yuan tickets to the issue of tourists, after repeated fermentation, the afternoon of May 20 came the news stop charging. Zhangjiakou City, Zhangbei County Government decided that from May 20, 2016, the abolition of "Grass Skyline" scenic area charges. But the evening news reporter learned that morning, starting from May 21, Sky Road, no longer receive tickets.
