= Qiaoxi District =

Qiaoxi District (桥西区) may refer to the following locations in Hebei, China:

- Qiaoxi District, Shijiazhuang
- Qiaoxi District, Xingtai
- Qiaoxi District, Zhangjiakou
