= Dahulun =

Dahulun 大囫囵镇
- Town
- Dàhúlún Zhèn
- Location in Hebei Location in China
- Coordinates: 41°20′11″N 115°12′20″E
- Country: People's Republic of China
- Province: Hebei
- Prefecture-level city: Zhangjiakou
- County: Zhangbei

Area
  - Total: 286.7 km^{2} (110.7 sq mi)

Population (2010)
  - Total: 11,314
  - Density: 39.46/km^{2} (102.2/sq mi)
- Time zone: UTC+8 (China Standard)

Dahulun (Chinese: 大囫囵镇; pinyin: Dàhúlún Zhèn) is a town located in Zhangbei County, Zhangjiakou, Hebei, China. According to the 2010 census, Dahulun had a population of 11,314, including 5,780 males and 5,534 females. The population was distributed as follows: 1,520 people aged under 14, 8,231 people aged between 15 and 64, and 1,563 people aged over 65.

Notable attractions in Dahulun include the Hongshan Temple and Guan Gong Temple.

== See also ==
- List of township-level divisions of Hebei
