= Buzili Subdistrict =

Buzili Subdistrict 堡子里街道
- Urban Subdistrict
- Bǔzilǐ Jiēdào
- Location in Hebei Location in China
- Coordinates: 40°49′08″N 114°52′11″E
- Country: People's Republic of China
- Province: Hebei
- Prefecture-level city: Zhangjiakou
- District: Qiaoxi

Area
  - Total: 0.5812 km^{2} (0.2244 sq mi)

Population (2010)
  - Total: 14,041
- Time zone: UTC+8 (China Standard)

Buzili Subdistrict (Chinese: 堡子里街道; pinyin: Bǔzilǐ Jiēdào) is an urban subdistrict located in Qiaoxi District, Zhangjiakou, Hebei, China. According to the 2010 census, Buzili Subdistrict had a population of 14,041, including 7,005 males and 7,036 females. The population was distributed as follows: 1,538 people aged under 14, 10,818 people aged between 15 and 64, and 1,685 people aged over 65.

== See also ==
- List of township-level divisions of Hebei
