= Dongyaozi =

Dongyaozi 东窑子镇
- Town
- Dōngyáozi Zhèn
- Location in Hebei Location in China
- Coordinates: 40°50′58″N 114°53′24″E
- Country: People's Republic of China
- Province: Hebei
- Prefecture-level city: Zhangjiakou
- District: Qiaoxi

Area
  - Total: 85.96 km^{2} (33.19 sq mi)

Population (2010)
  - Total: 26,240
  - Density: 305.2/km^{2} (790/sq mi)
- Time zone: UTC+8 (China Standard)

Dongyaozi (Chinese: 东窑子镇; pinyin: Dōngyáozi Zhèn) is a town located in Qiaoxi District, Zhangjiakou, Hebei, China. According to the 2010 census, Dongyaozi had a population of 26,240, including 13,291 males and 12,949 females. The population was distributed as follows: 4,384 people aged under 14, 19,989 people aged between 15 and 64, and 1,867 people aged over 65.

== See also ==
- List of township-level divisions of Hebei
