= Danjinghe Township =

Danjinghe Township 单晶河乡
- Rural Township
- Dānjīnghé Xiāng
- Location in Hebei Location in China
- Coordinates: 41°11′17″N 114°22′50″E
- Country: People's Republic of China
- Province: Hebei
- Prefecture-level city: Zhangjiakou
- County: Zhangbei

Area
  - Total: 150.1 km^{2} (58.0 sq mi)

Population (2010)
  - Total: 7,944
  - Density: 52.91/km^{2} (137.0/sq mi)
- Time zone: UTC+8 (China Standard)

Danjinghe Township (Chinese: 单晶河乡; pinyin: Dānjīnghé Xiāng) is a rural township located in Zhangbei County, Zhangjiakou, Hebei, China. According to the 2010 census, Danjinghe Township had a population of 7,944, including 4,133 males and 3,811 females. The population was distributed as follows: 971 people aged under 14, 5,688 people aged between 15 and 64, and 1,285 people aged over 65.

== See also ==
- List of township-level divisions of Hebei
