= Baimiaotan Township =

Baimiaotan Township 白庙滩乡
- Rural Township
- Báimiàotān Xiāng
- Location in Hebei Location in China
- Coordinates: 41°14′39″N 114°56′21″E
- Country: People's Republic of China
- Province: Hebei
- Prefecture-level city: Zhangjiakou
- County: Zhangbei

Area
  - Total: 211.0 km^{2} (81.5 sq mi)

Population (2010)
  - Total: 7,558
  - Density: 35.82/km^{2} (92.8/sq mi)
- Time zone: UTC+8 (China Standard)

Baimiaotan Township (Chinese: 白庙滩乡; pinyin: Báimiàotān Xiāng) is a rural township located in Zhangbei County, Zhangjiakou, Hebei, China. According to the 2010 census, Baimiaotan Township had a population of 7,558, including 3,851 males and 3,707 females. The population was distributed as follows: 988 people aged under 14, 5,522 people aged between 15 and 64, and 1,048 people aged over 65.

== See also ==
- List of township-level divisions of Hebei
