= Ertai (town) =

Ertai 二台镇
- Town
- Èrtái Zhèn
- Location in Hebei Location in China
- Coordinates: 41°23′28″N 114°55′53″E
- Country: People's Republic of China
- Province: Hebei
- Prefecture-level city: Zhangjiakou
- County: Zhangbei

Area
  - Total: 360.0 km^{2} (139.0 sq mi)

Population (2010)
  - Total: 18,673
  - Density: 51.87/km^{2} (134.3/sq mi)
- Time zone: UTC+8 (China Standard)

Ertai (Chinese: 二台镇; pinyin: Èrtái Zhèn) is a town located in Zhangbei County, Zhangjiakou, Hebei, China. According to the 2010 census, Ertai had a population of 18,673, including 9,540 males and 9,133 females. The population was distributed as follows: 2,935 people aged under 14, 13,568 people aged between 15 and 64, and 2,170 people aged over 65.

== See also ==
- List of township-level divisions of Hebei
