= Qiaodong District =

Qiaodong District (Chinese: 桥东区) may refer to the following locations in Hebei, China:

- Qiaodong District, Shijiazhuang, merged into Chang'an and Qiaoxi districts in 2014
- Qiaodong District, Xingtai
- Qiaodong District, Zhangjiakou
