= Xiahuayuan railway station =

Railway station in Zhangjiakou, China

Coordinates: 40°29′08″N 115°16′51″E

Xiahuayuan 下花园站
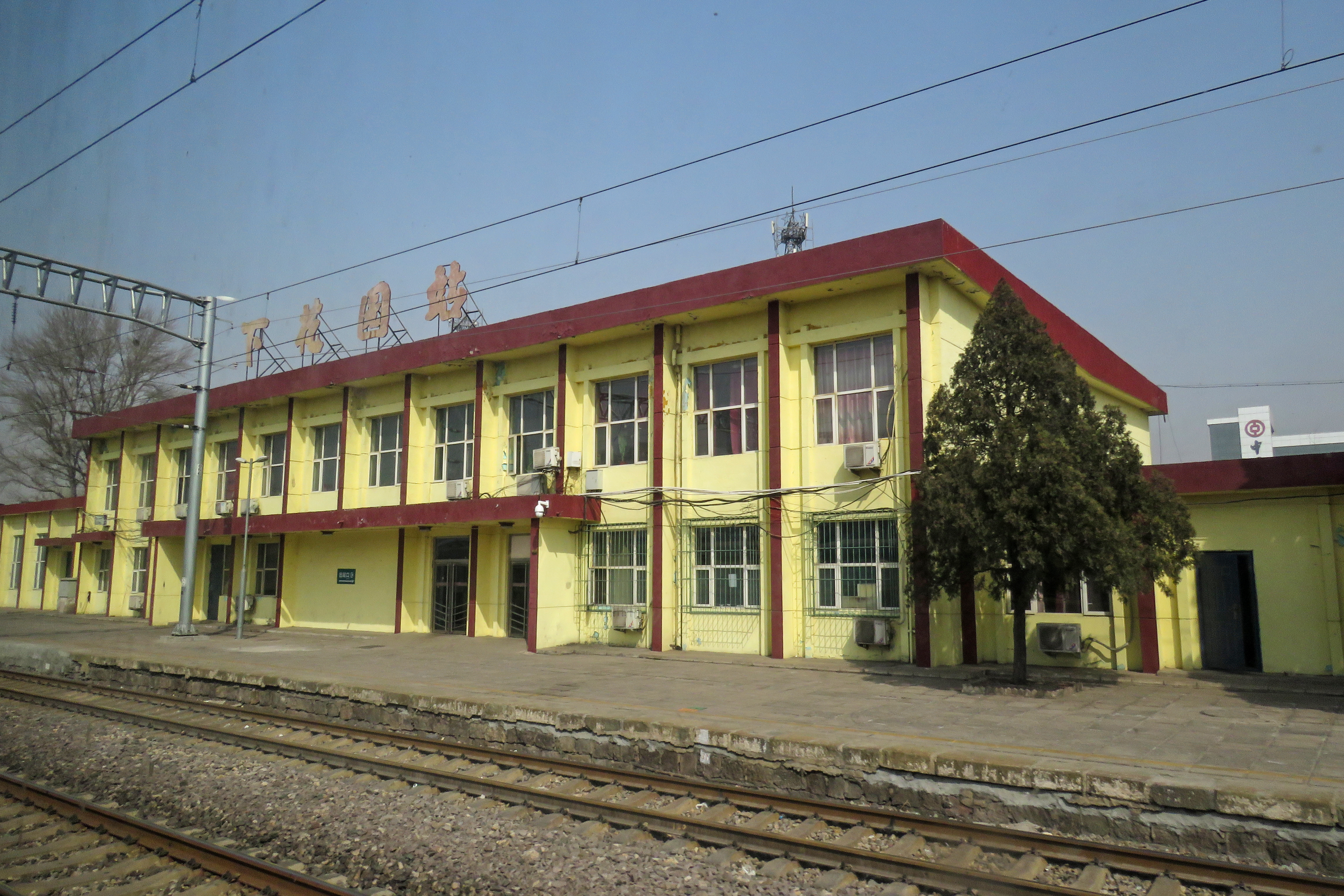

General information
- Location: Xiahuayuan District, Zhangjiakou, Hebei; China
- Line: Beijing-Baotou railway

Other information
- Station code: XYP

Xiahuayuan railway station (simplified Chinese: 下花园站; traditional Chinese: 下花園站; pinyin: Xiàhuāyuán Zhàn) is a station on the Beijing–Baotou railway. The station is located in Xiahuayuan District, Zhangjiakou Hebei.

== See also ==
- List of stations on Jingbao railway
