= Xiahuayuan, Zhangjiakou =

Xiahuayuan 下花园区
- District
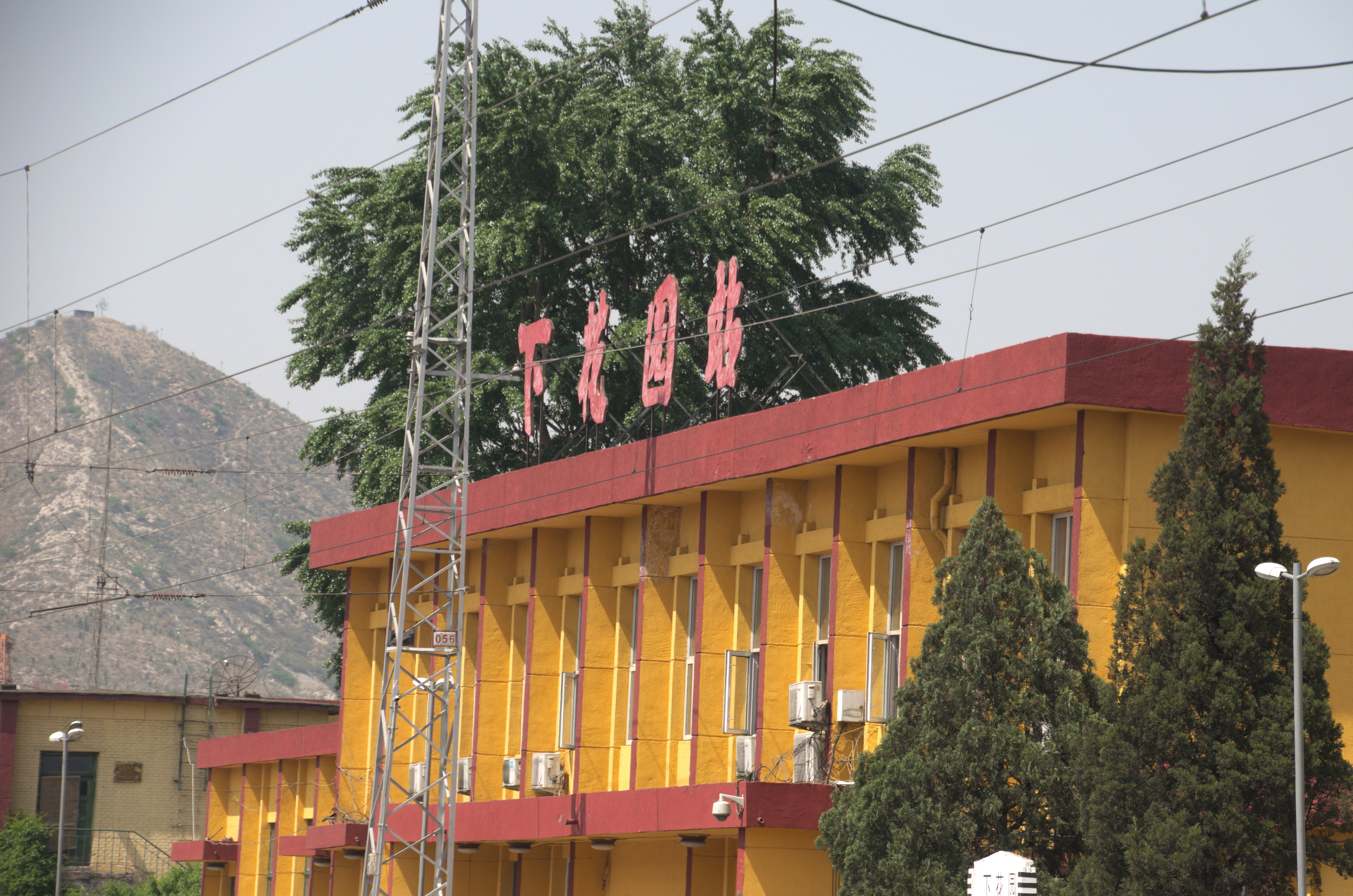
- Xiahuayuan railway station

- Location in Hebei
- Coordinates: 40°30′11″N 115°17′13″E
- Country: People's Republic of China
- Province: Hebei
- Prefecture-level city: Zhangjiakou

Area
  - Total: 315.4 km^{2} (121.8 sq mi)

Population (2020 census)
  - Total: 64,216
  - Density: 203.6/km^{2} (527.3/sq mi)
- Time zone: UTC+8 (China Standard)
- Website: www.xhyggzy.com

Xiahuayuan District (simplified Chinese: 下花园区; traditional Chinese: 下花園區; pinyin: Xiàhuāyuán Qū) is a district of the city of Zhangjiakou, Hebei province, China.

== Administrative divisions ==
Subdistricts:

- Chengzhen Subdistrict (城镇街道), Meikuang Subdistrict (煤矿街道)

Townships:

- Huayuan Township (花园乡), Xinzhuangzi Township (辛庄子乡), Dingfangshui Township (定方水乡), Duanjiabu Township (段家堡乡)
