= Qiaoxi, Zhangjiakou =

Qiaoxi 桥西区
- District
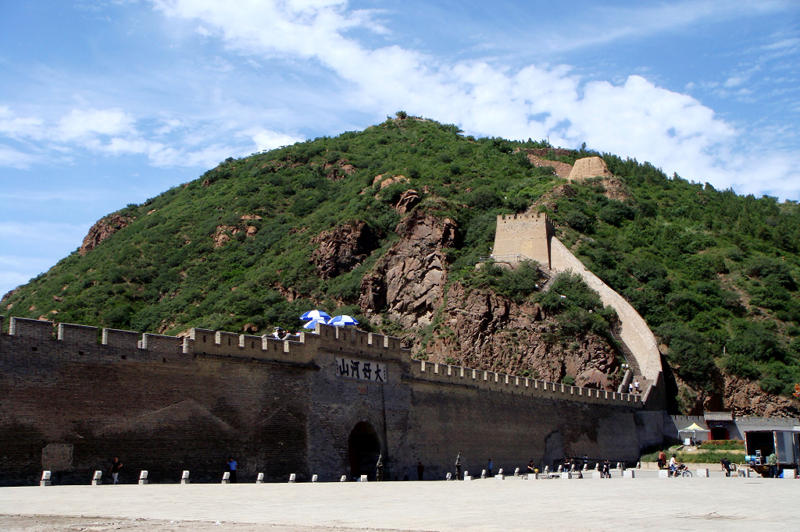
- The Great Wall at Dajingmen

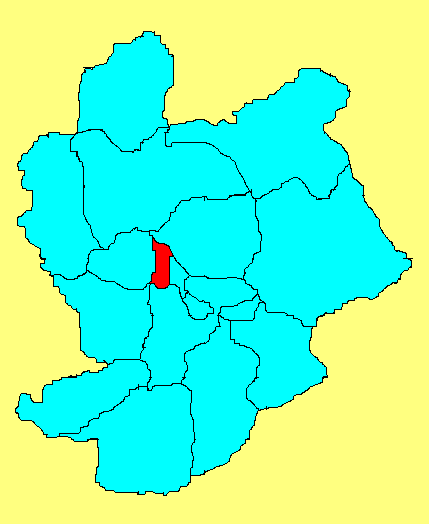
- Location in Zhangjiakou

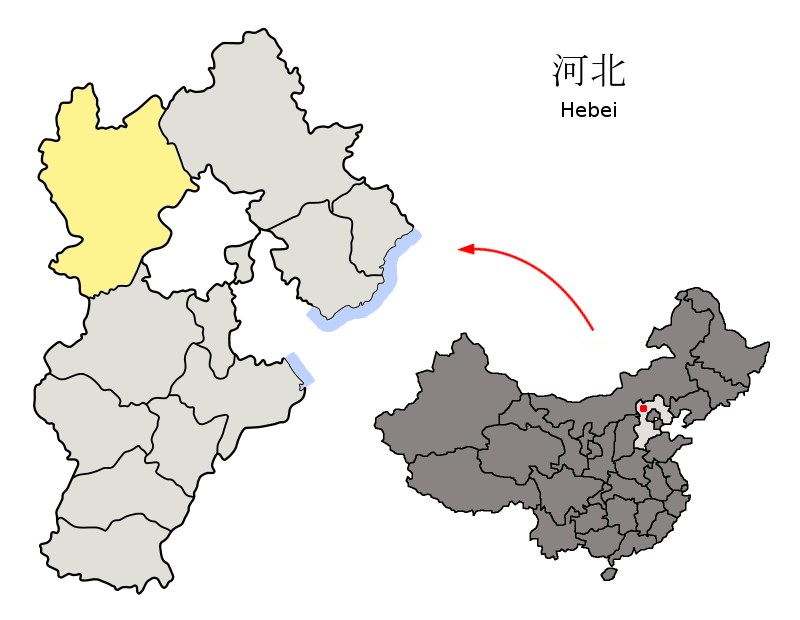
- Location of Zhangjiakou in Hebei
- Coordinates: 40°50′00″N 114°51′10″E
- Country: China
- Province: Hebei
- Prefecture-level city: Zhangjiakou
- District seat: Nanyingfang Subdistrict

Area
  - Total: 210.19 km^{2} (81.15 sq mi)

Population (2020 census)
  - Total: 279,033
  - Density: 1,327.5/km^{2} (3,438.3/sq mi)
- Time zone: UTC+8 (China Standard)
- Website: www.zjkqxq.gov.cn

Qiaoxi District (simplified Chinese: 桥西区; traditional Chinese: 橋西區; pinyin: Qiáoxi Qū; lit. 'West of the Bridge') is a district of the city of Zhangjiakou, Hebei, China.

== Administrative divisions ==
Qiaoxi District is divided into 7 subdistricts and 1 town.

- Xinhua Avenue Subdistrict (新华街街道)
- Dajingmen Subdistrict (大境门街道)
- North Mingde Avenue Subdistrict (明德北街街道)
- South Mingde Avenue Subdistrict (明德南街街道)
- Baozili Subdistrict (堡子里街道)
- Nanyingfang Subdistrict (南营坊街道)
- Gongren New Village Subdistrict (工人新村街道)
- Dongyaozi Town (东窑子镇)
