= Qiaodong, Zhangjiakou =

District in Hebei, China

Qiaodong 桥东区
- District
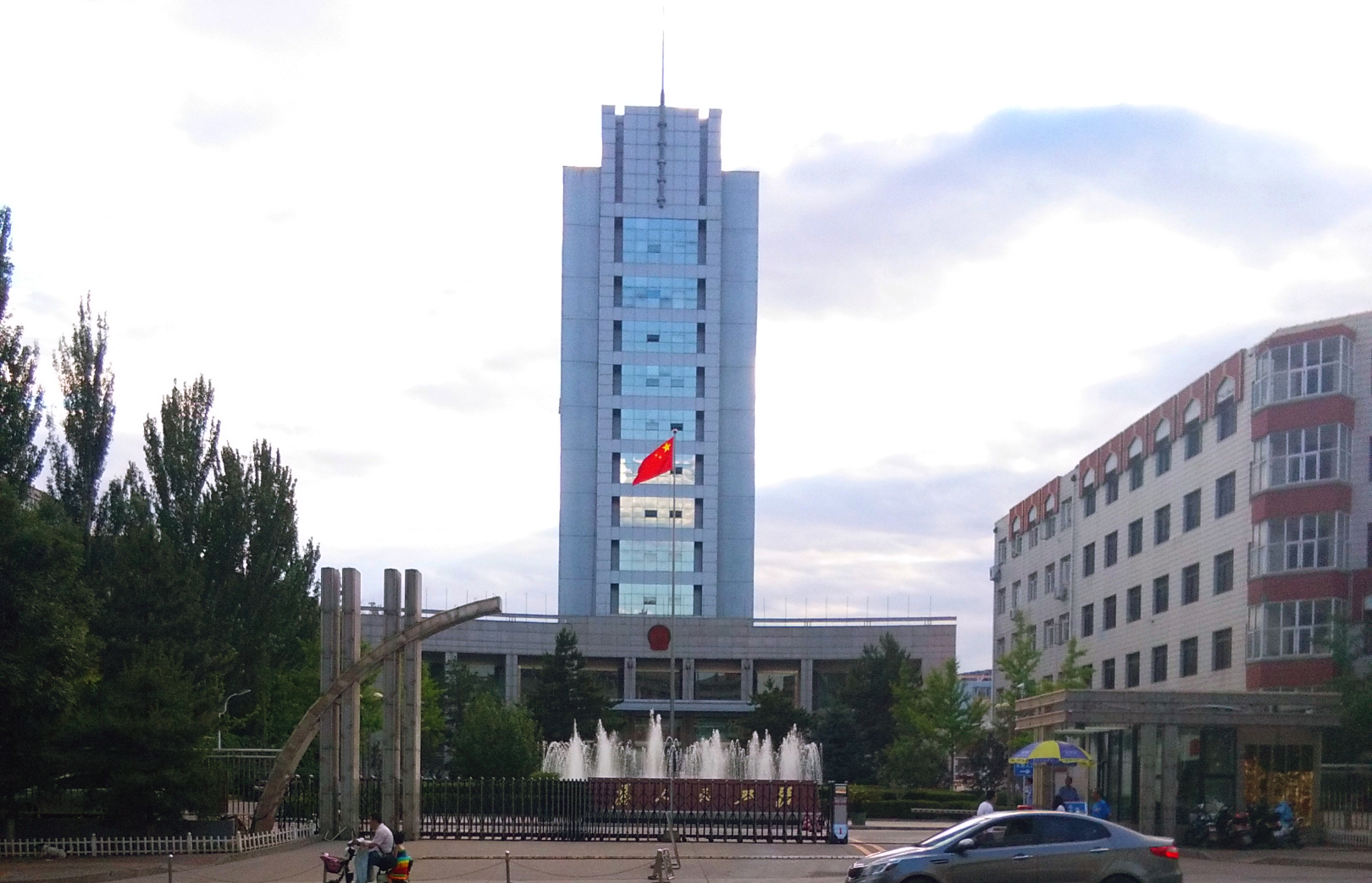
- People's government of Qiaodong District

- Location in Hebei
- Coordinates: 40°47′17″N 114°53′38″E
- Country: People's Republic of China
- Province: Hebei
- Prefecture-level city: Zhangjiakou

Area
  - Total: 403.2 km^{2} (155.7 sq mi)

Population (2020 census)
  - Total: 422,753
  - Density: 1,048/km^{2} (2,716/sq mi)
- Time zone: UTC+8 (China Standard)

Qiaodong District (simplified Chinese: 桥东区; traditional Chinese: 橋東區; pinyin: Qiáodōng Qū; lit. 'East of the Bridge') is a district and the seat of the city of Zhangjiakou, Hebei province, China.

== Administrative divisions ==
Subdistricts:

- Hongqilou Subdistrict (红旗楼街道), North Shengli Road Subdistrict (胜利北路街道), Wuyi Road Subdistrict (五一大街街道), Huayuan Avenue Subdistrict (花园街街道), Zuanshi Road Subdistrict (钻石路街道), Nanzhan Subdistrict (南站街道), Maludong Subdistrict (马路东街道)

At the time of the 2010 census, the district had a population of 339,372.

Towns:

- Laoyazhuang Town (老鸦庄镇), Yaojiazhuang Town (姚家庄镇), Dacanggai Town (大仓盖镇)

Townships:

- Dongwangshan Township (东望山乡)
