= Dajingmen =

Junction of the Great Wall of China

- 大境门 (Chinese)
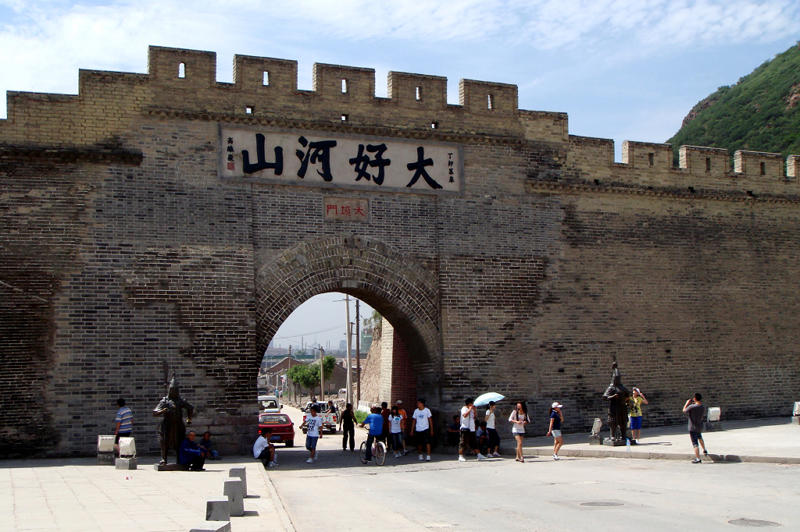
- Interactive map of Dajingmen
- 40°50′40″N 114°53′10″E

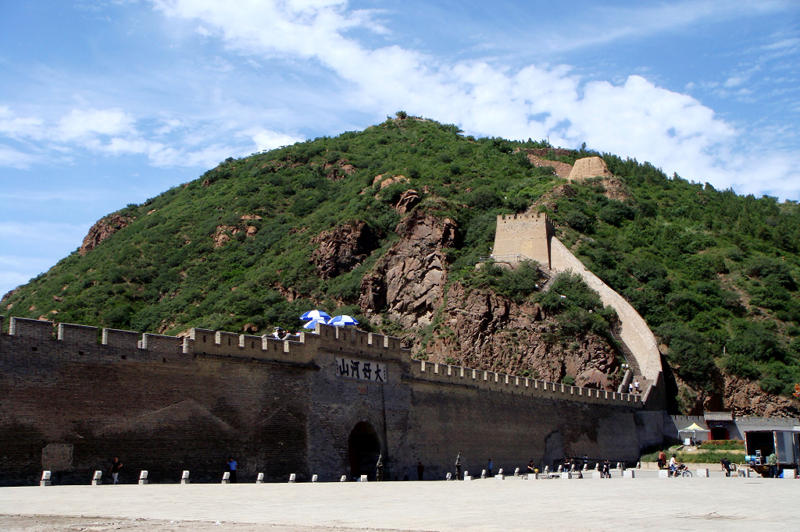
The Great Wall at Dajingmen, and Mount West Taiping

Dajingmen (simplified Chinese: 大境门; traditional Chinese: 大境門; pinyin: Dàjìngmén), also known as Dajing Gate, is an important junction of the Great Wall of China in the prefecture-level city of Zhangjiakou within the Chinese province of Hebei. Dajingmen was built in 1644 in the first year of the reign of the Shunzhi Emperor in the Qing Dynasty The gate is 12 metres high, 9 metres wide, and 13 metres deep. Above the gate is a terrace measuring 12 by 7.5 metres. The wall above the gate is topped by 1.7-metre-high (5.6 ft) towers, which are accompanied by a 0.8-metre-high (2.6 ft) parapet wall on the side. The inscription 大好河山 ("Magnificent Rivers and Mountains") found over the lintel was mounted in traditional Han-Style in 1927 on the initiative of Gao Weiyue (高维岳), the ruler of the former province of Chahar (now Inner Mongolia).

Just to the west of the gate, on the plain in which the city lies, there is an approximately 100 meter long part of the wall faced in brick; then further west, a very well-preserved Great Wall, built of hard rock, follows the mountainous terrain.
