= Zhangbei, Hebei =

Town in Hebei, China

Coordinates: 41°09′03″N 114°42′52″E

Zhangbei (simplified Chinese: 张北; traditional Chinese: 張北; pinyin: Zhāngběi) is a town in and the seat of government of Zhangbei County, Hebei, China. It served as the capital of the Imperial Japanese puppet state, Mengjiang from 1 September 1939–19 August 1945.

== See also ==
- List of township-level divisions of Hebei
