= Zhangbei County =

Zhangbei County 张北县 Changpeh, Chang-pei
- County
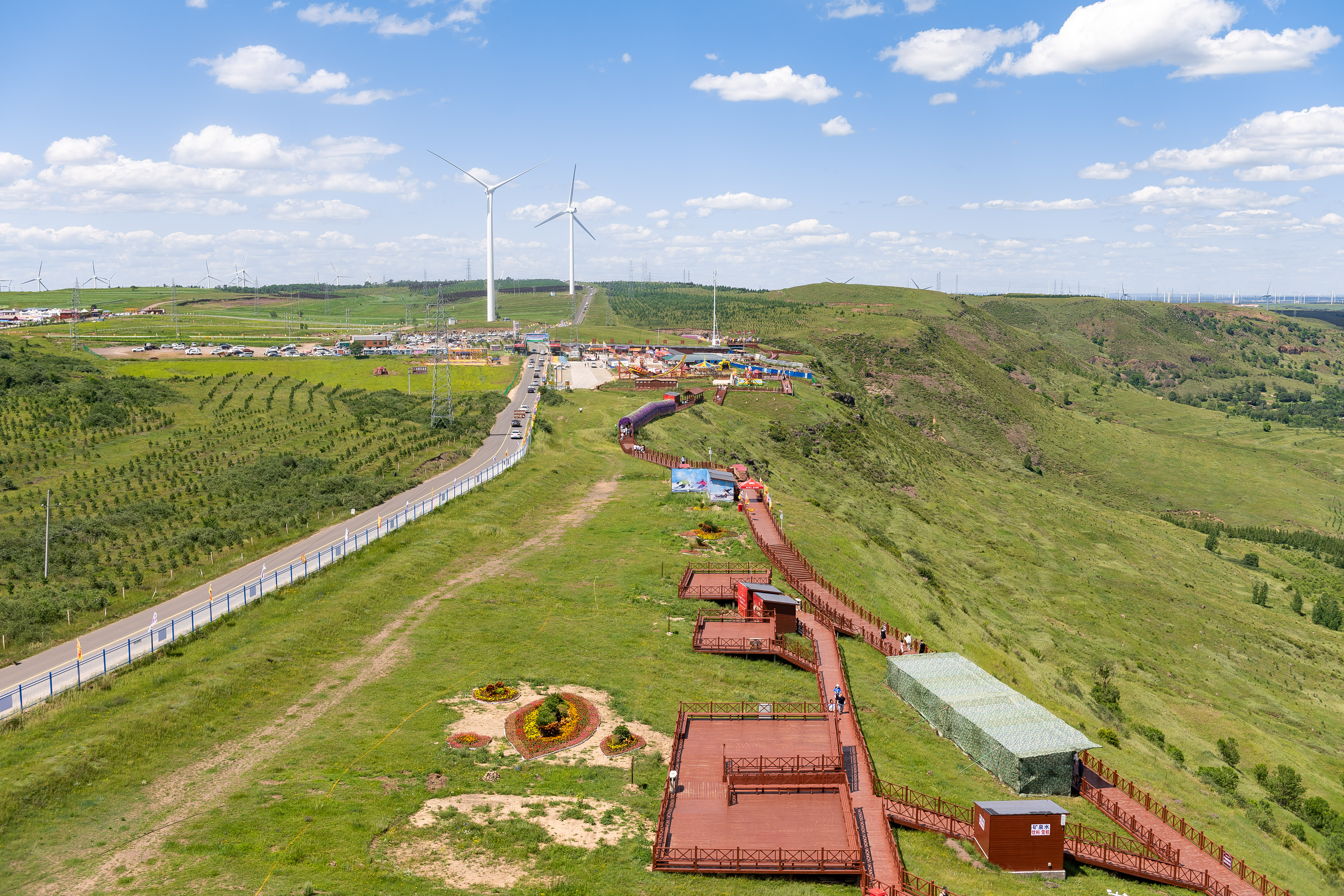

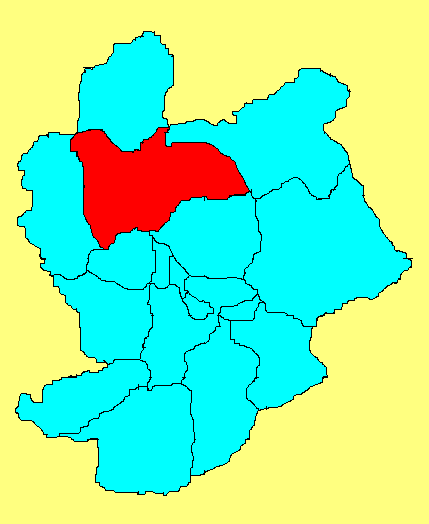
- Location in Zhangjiakou

- Location of the seat in Hebei
- Coordinates: 41°10′N 114°45′E
- Country: People's Republic of China
- Province: Hebei
- Prefecture-level city: Zhangjiakou
- County seat: Zhangbei Town

Area
  - Total: 4,185 km^{2} (1,616 sq mi)

Population (2020 census)
  - Total: 325,795
  - Density: 77.85/km^{2} (201.6/sq mi)
- Time zone: UTC+8 (China Standard)

Zhangbei County (simplified Chinese: 张北县; traditional Chinese: 張北縣; pinyin: Zhāngběi Xiàn), in northwestern Hebei province, China, is a county formerly in the Chahar province. Its name, which literally means "North of Zhang[jiakou]", derives from the fact that it is 40 km (25 mi) north-northeast of Zhangjiakou. Zhangbei Town is the seat of the county government.

== Administrative divisions ==
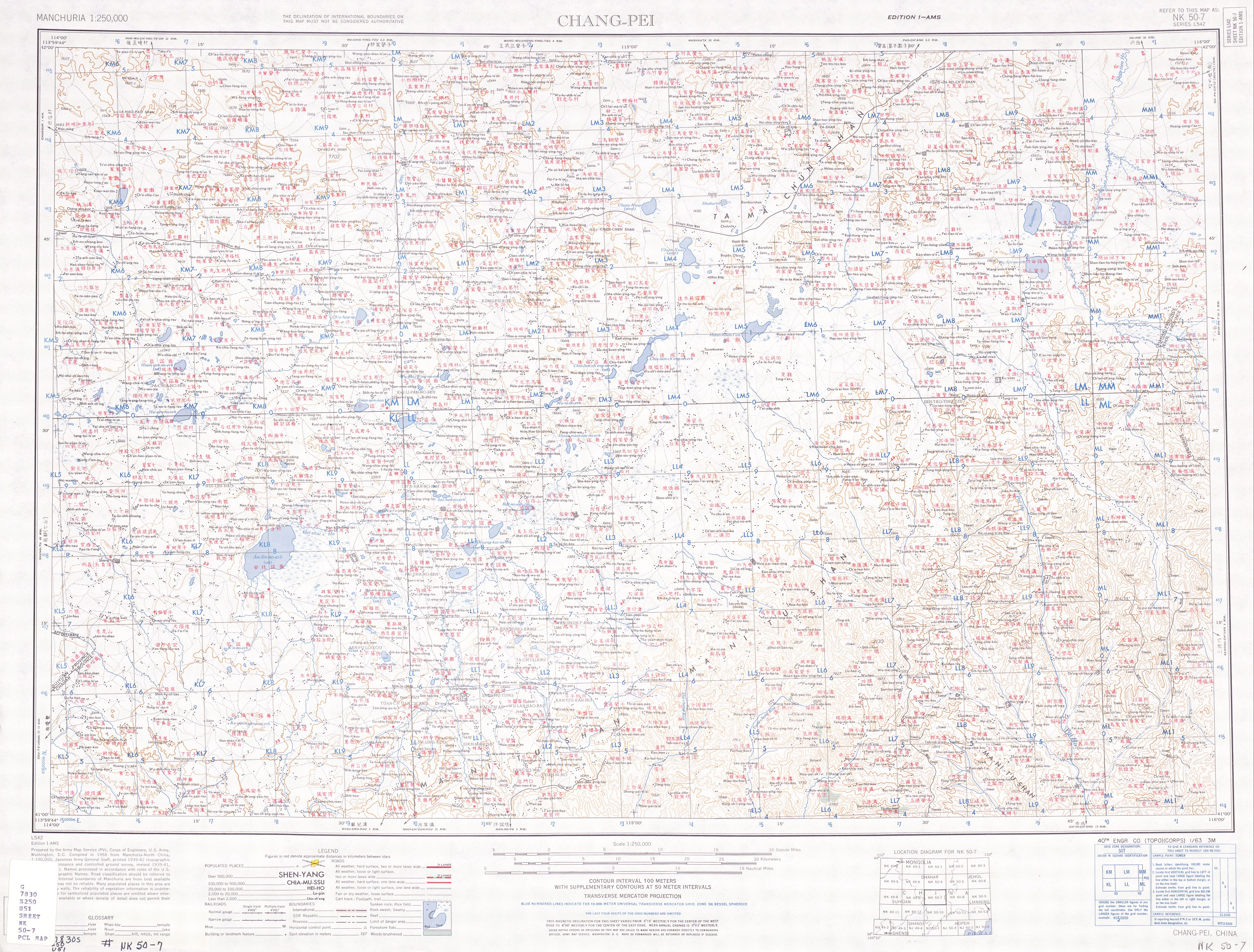
Map including Zhangbei (labeled as Chang-pei 長北) (AMS, 1958)

There are 4 towns and 14 townships under the county's administration.

Towns:

- Zhangbei Town (张北镇), Gonghui (公会镇), Ertai (二台镇), Dahulun (大囫囵镇)

Townships:

- Tailugou Township (台路沟乡), Youlougou Township (油篓沟乡), Mantouying Township (馒头营乡), Erquanjing Township (二泉井乡), Danjinghe Township (单晶河乡), Dahe Township (大河乡), Hailiutu Township (海流图乡), Liangmianjing Township (两面井乡), Haojiaying Township (郝家营乡), Baimiaotan Township (白庙滩乡), Xiao'ertai Township (小二台乡), Zhanhai Township (战海乡), Sanhao Township (三号乡), Huangshiya Township (黄石崖乡)

== Climate ==
Climate data for Zhangbei, elevation 1,393 m (4,570 ft), (1991–2020 normals, extremes 1981–2010)
Month	Jan	Feb	Mar	Apr	May	Jun	Jul	Aug	Sep	Oct	Nov	Dec	Year
Record high °C (°F)	7.4 (45.3)	12.5 (54.5)	20.9 (69.6)	28.2 (82.8)	32.6 (90.7)	33.9 (93.0)	36.7 (98.1)	33.2 (91.8)	30.9 (87.6)	23.8 (74.8)	17.0 (62.6)	12.0 (53.6)	36.7 (98.1)
Mean daily maximum °C (°F)	−7.4 (18.7)	−2.7 (27.1)	4.4 (39.9)	12.8 (55.0)	19.4 (66.9)	23.5 (74.3)	25.2 (77.4)	23.9 (75.0)	18.9 (66.0)	11.3 (52.3)	2.0 (35.6)	−5.5 (22.1)	10.5 (50.9)
Daily mean °C (°F)	−14.3 (6.3)	−10.0 (14.0)	−2.4 (27.7)	5.9 (42.6)	12.9 (55.2)	17.4 (63.3)	19.6 (67.3)	18.0 (64.4)	12.4 (54.3)	4.7 (40.5)	−4.3 (24.3)	−11.8 (10.8)	4.0 (39.2)
Mean daily minimum °C (°F)	−19.6 (−3.3)	−15.7 (3.7)	−8.4 (16.9)	−0.7 (30.7)	6.0 (42.8)	11.2 (52.2)	14.2 (57.6)	12.6 (54.7)	6.6 (43.9)	−0.8 (30.6)	−9.4 (15.1)	−16.9 (1.6)	−1.7 (28.9)
Record low °C (°F)	−33.3 (−27.9)	−34.3 (−29.7)	−25.3 (−13.5)	−15.5 (4.1)	−6.4 (20.5)	−2.1 (28.2)	4.9 (40.8)	0.1 (32.2)	−8.5 (16.7)	−16.5 (2.3)	−29.5 (−21.1)	−30.4 (−22.7)	−34.3 (−29.7)
Average precipitation mm (inches)	1.8 (0.07)	3.1 (0.12)	6.9 (0.27)	17.5 (0.69)	36.2 (1.43)	66.5 (2.62)	102.3 (4.03)	76.0 (2.99)	54.2 (2.13)	21.3 (0.84)	8.1 (0.32)	2.3 (0.09)	396.2 (15.6)
Average precipitation days (≥ 0.1 mm)	3.5	3.8	4.3	5.6	7.6	12.1	13.6	11.7	9.9	5.8	4.5	3.3	85.7
Average snowy days	6.4	6.1	6.1	3.9	0.5	0	0	0	0.3	2.5	5.9	6.5	38.2
Average relative humidity (%)	60	54	46	42	44	57	70	71	65	58	58	60	57
Mean monthly sunshine hours	205.9	205.8	244.9	254.4	280.6	255.2	249.7	249.6	233.9	230.4	198.6	190.0	2,799
Percentage possible sunshine	69	68	66	63	62	57	55	59	63	68	68	67	64
Source: China Meteorological Administration

== Transportation ==
- China National Highway 207
