= Zhangjiakou =

Zhangjiakou 张家口市 Changchiakow, Kalgan
- Prefecture-level city
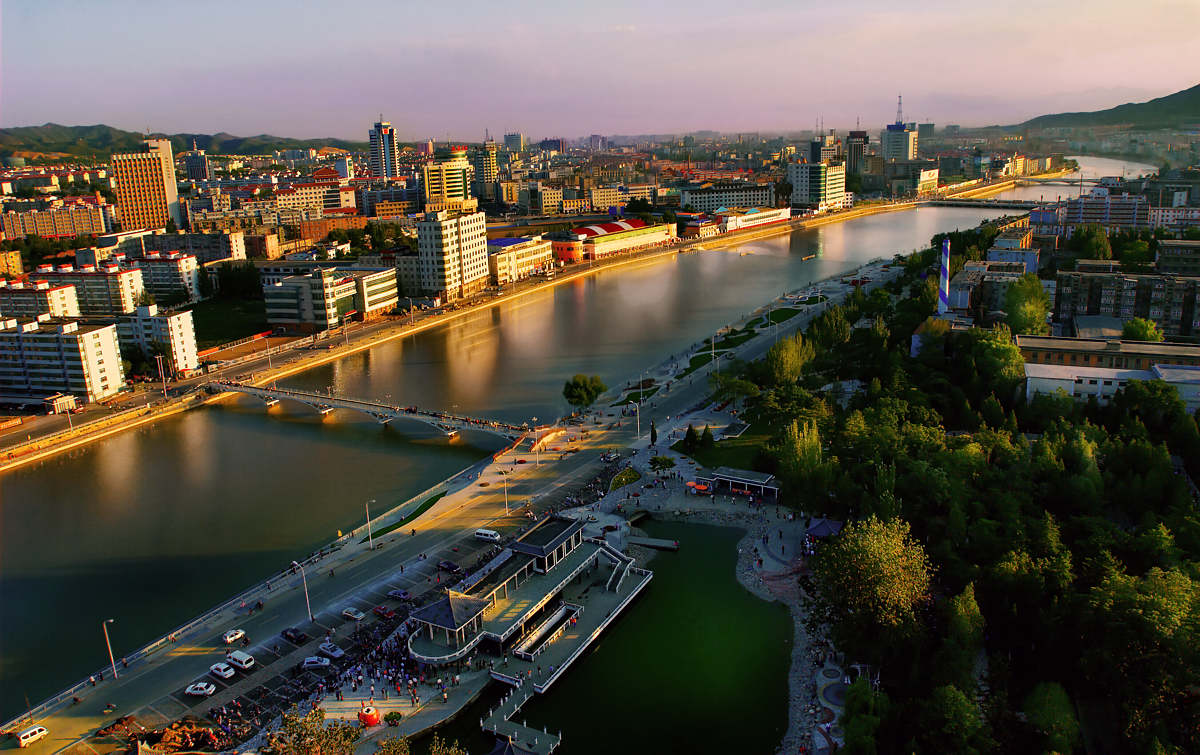
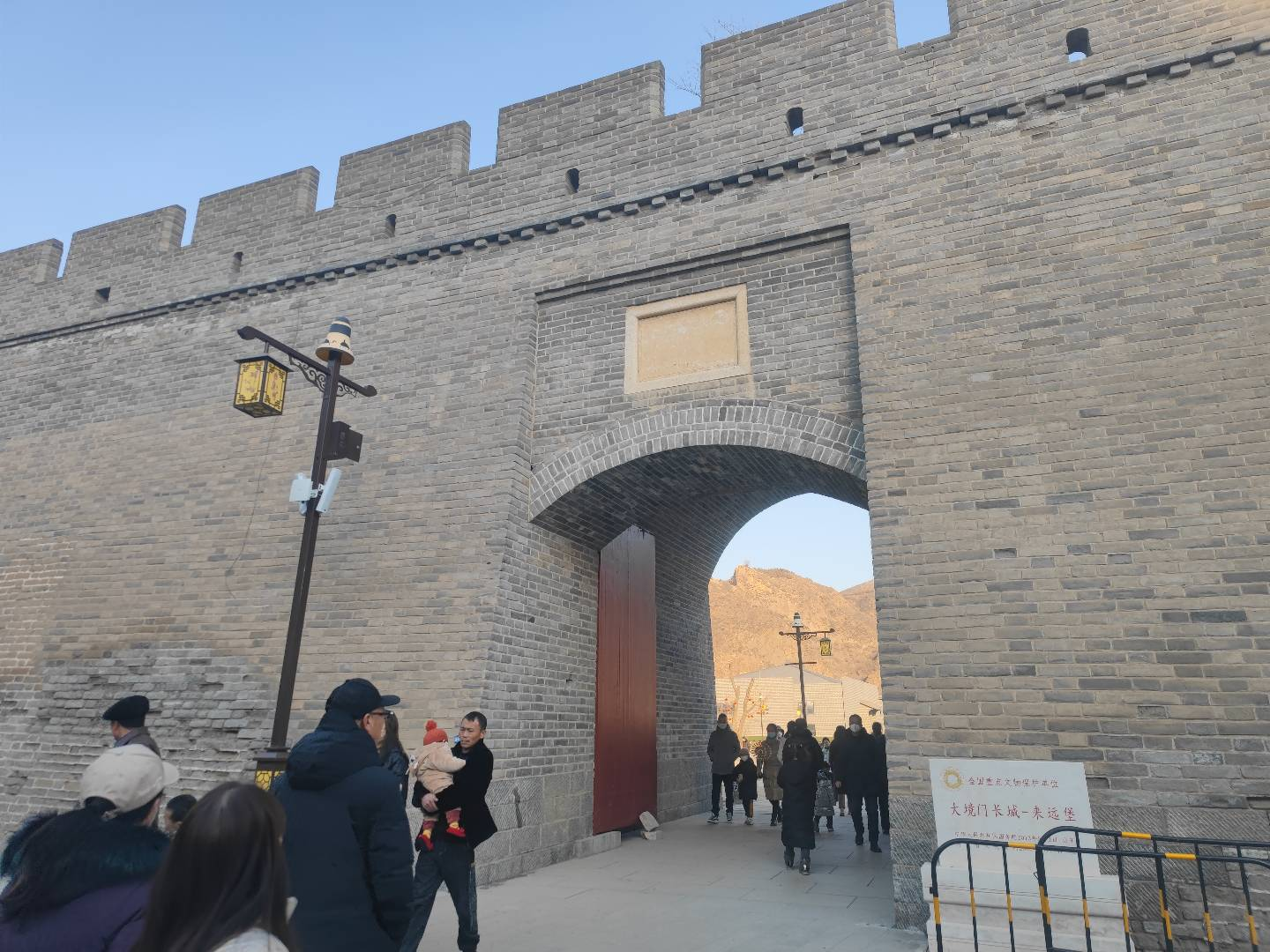
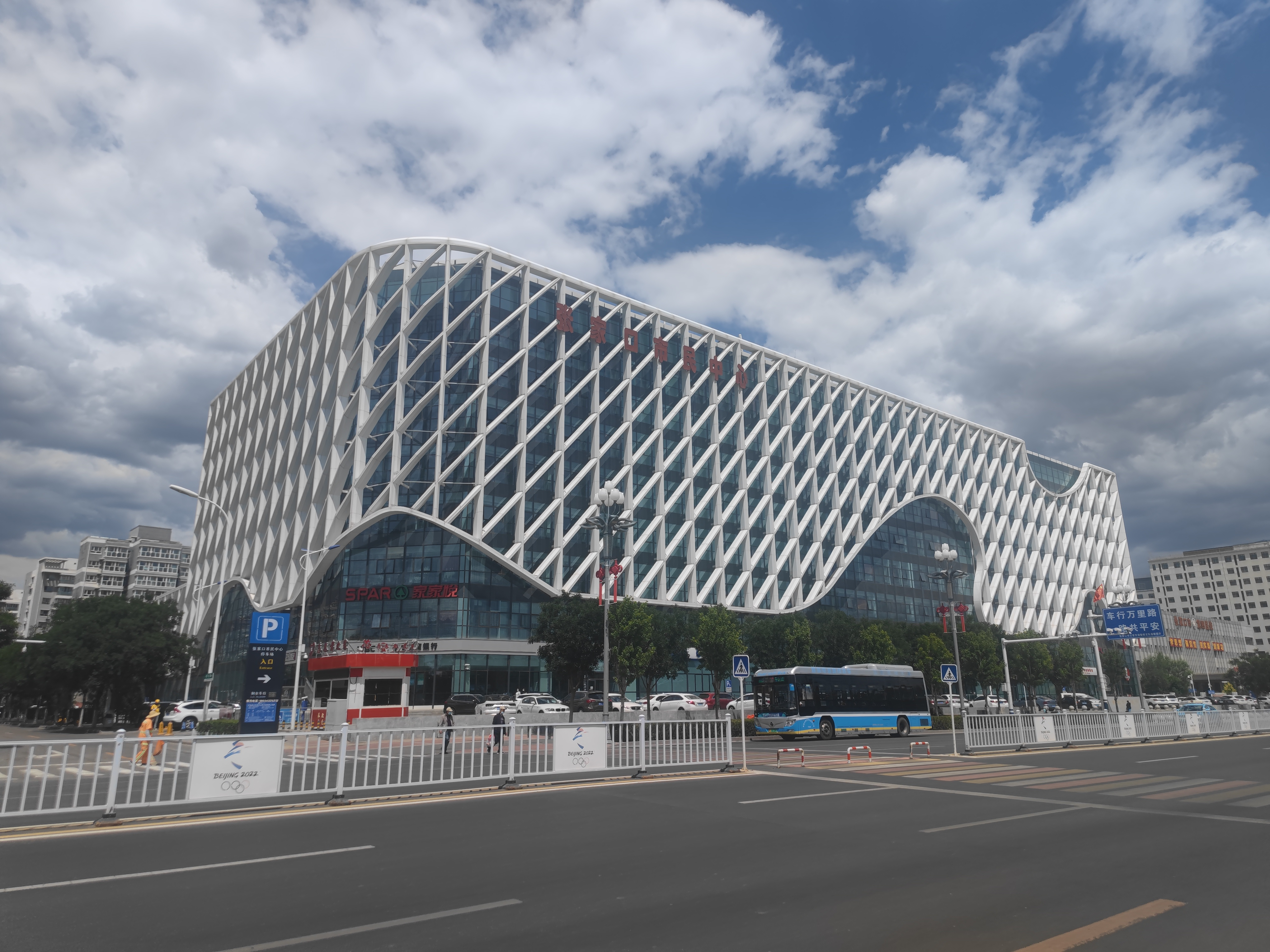
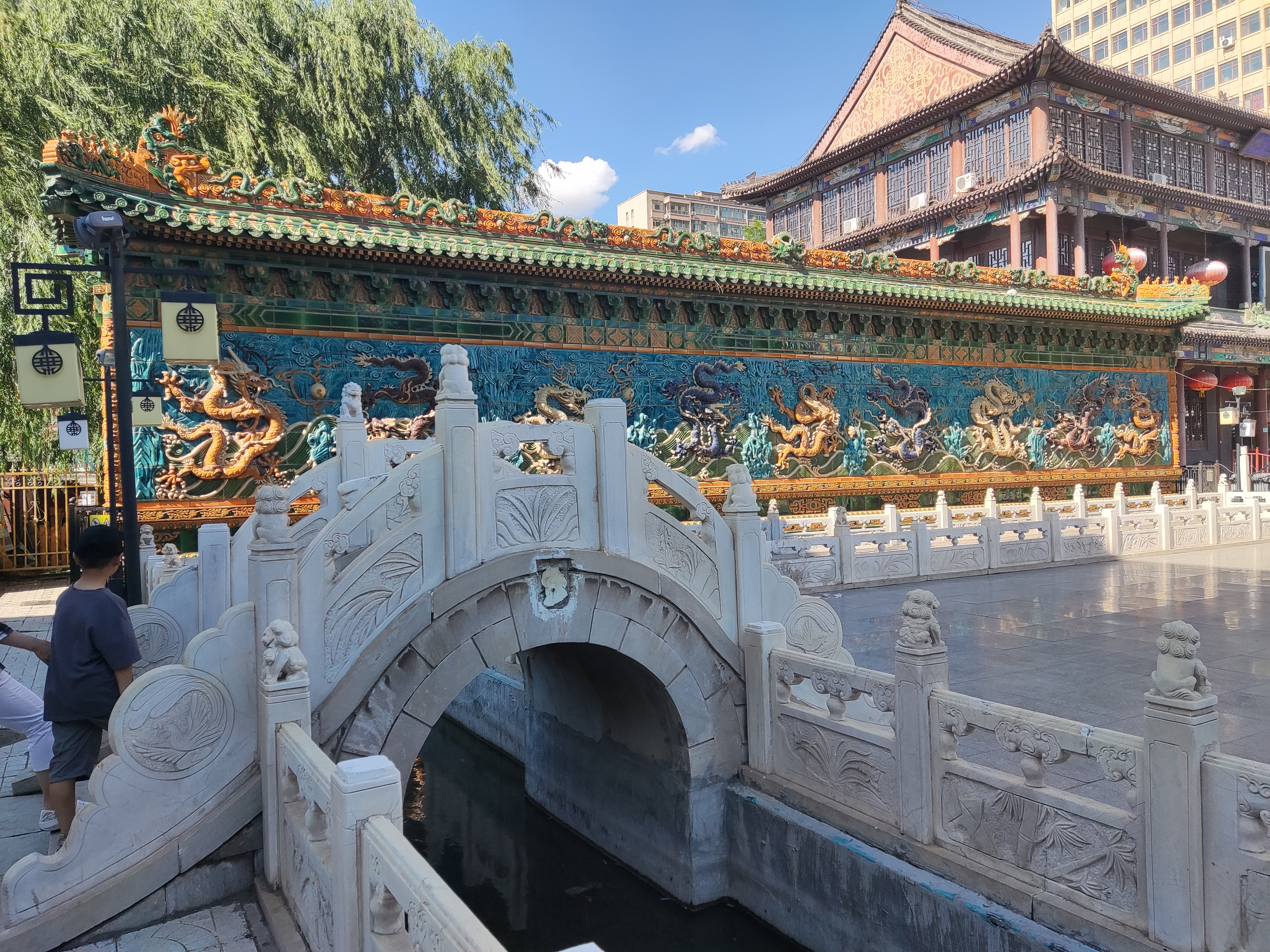
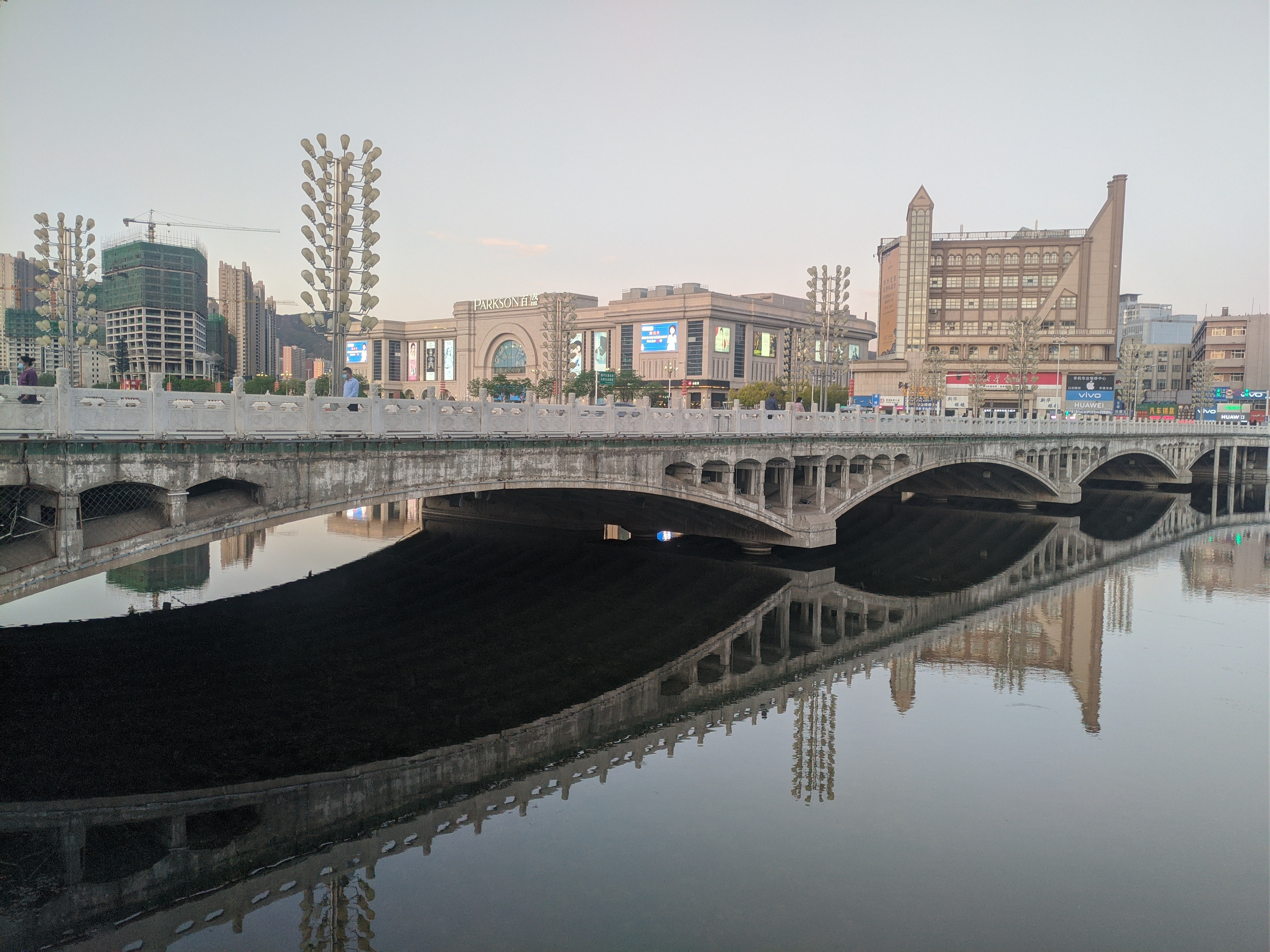
- Clockwise from the top: Qingshui riverfront, Zhangjiakou Civic Center, Tong Bridge, Qingyuan Building, Dajingmen
- Nicknames: Pearl of the Great Wall (塞外明珠), Northern Gate of Beijing
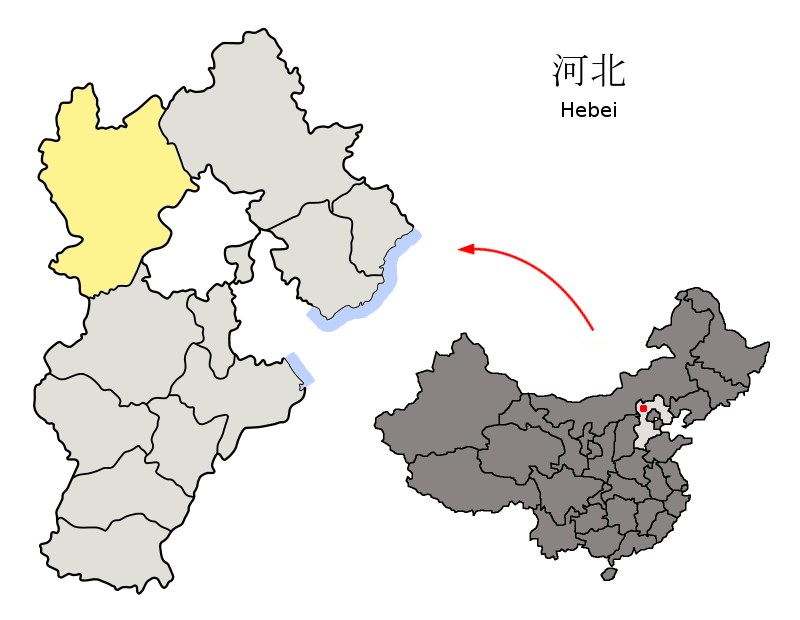
- Location of Zhangjiakou City jurisdiction in Hebei

- Location of the city centre in Hebei Zhangjiakou (Northern China) Zhangjiakou (China)
- Coordinates (Zhangjiakou municipal government): 40°46′08″N 114°53′10″E
- Country: People's Republic of China
- Province: Hebei
- Settled: 2500 B.C.
- Established: November 15, 1983
- Municipal seat: Qiaodong District

Government
  - Party Secretary: Hui Jian (回建)
  - Mayor: Wu Weidong (武卫东)

Area
  - Prefecture-level city: 36,861.56 km^{2} (14,232.33 sq mi)
  - Districts: 5,266 km^{2} (2,033 sq mi)
- Elevation: 716 m (2,349 ft)

Population (2020 census)
  - Prefecture-level city: 4,118,908
  - Density: 111.7399/km^{2} (289.4051/sq mi)
  - Urban: 2,722,683
  - Districts: 1,413,861

GDP
  - Prefecture-level city: CN¥ 136.4 billion US$ 21.9 billion
  - Per capita: CN¥ 30,840; US$4,952
- Time zone: UTC+8 (China Standard)
- ISO 3166 code: CN-HE-07
- Licence plate prefixes: 冀G
- Website: www.zjk.gov.cn

Zhangjiakou
- "Zhangjiakou", as written in Chinese

Chinese name
- Traditional Chinese: 張家口
- Simplified Chinese: 张家口
- Postal: Changchiakow
- Literal meaning: Zhang Family Pass
Transcriptions
Standard Mandarin
- Hanyu Pinyin: Zhāngjiākǒu
- Wade–Giles: Chang-chia-k'ou
- IPA: [ʈʂáŋ tɕjá kʰòʊ]

Kalgan
- Traditional Chinese: 喀拉幹
- Simplified Chinese: 喀拉干
Transcriptions
Standard Mandarin
- Hanyu Pinyin: Kālāgàn

Second alternative Chinese name
- Traditional Chinese: 張垣
- Simplified Chinese: 张垣
- Literal meaning: Zhang Wall
Transcriptions
Standard Mandarin
- Hanyu Pinyin: Zhāngyuán
- Wade–Giles: Chang-yüan

Mongolian name
- Mongolian Cyrillic: Чуулалт Хаалга; Хаалган
- Mongolian script: ᠴᠢᠭᠣᠯᠠᠯᠲᠣ ᠬᠠᠭᠠᠯᠭ᠎ᠠ ᠬᠠᠭᠠᠯᠭᠠᠨ
Transcriptions
- SASM/GNC: Čuulalt Haalga (Čiɣulaltu Qaɣalɣa); Haalgan (Qaɣalɣan)

Zhangjiakou (/ˈdʒɑːŋdʒiˈɑːˈkoʊ/), also known as Kalgan and by several other names, is a prefecture-level city in northwestern Hebei province in Northern China, bordering Beijing to the southeast, Inner Mongolia to the north and west, and Shanxi to the southwest. In 2020, its population was 4,118,908 inhabitants, with an area of 36,861.56 square kilometres (14,232.33 sq mi), divided into 17 counties and districts. The built-up (or metro) area, made up of Qiaoxi, Qiaodong, Chongli, Xuanhua, and Xiahuayuan Districts, is largely conurbated, with 1,413,861 inhabitants in 2020 in an area of 5,266 km^{2} (2,033 sq mi). In 2024, the registered population of the whole region is 208.896 million.

Since ancient times, Zhangjiakou has been a stronghold of military significance and vied for by multiple sides, hence it is nicknamed the Northern Gate of Beijing. Due to its strategic position on several important transport arteries, it is a critical node for travel between Hebei and Inner Mongolia and connecting northwest China, Mongolia, and Beijing. Dajingmen, an important gate and junction of the Great Wall of China, is located here.

In the south, Zhangjiakou is largely cultivated for agricultural use. In the north, Bashang is a part of the Mongolian plateau and dominated by grasslands. The forest coverage reaches 37%, earning Zhangjiakou the title of National Forest City. According to the Ministry of Environmental Protection, Zhangjiakou has the freshest air and the least PM 2.5 pollution of all Chinese cities north of the Yellow River. Zhangjiakou also possesses 4.6% of China's wind energy resources, and the city ranks second in solar energy use. Zhangjiakou was one of the host cities at the 2022 Winter Olympics.

== Names ==
Zhangjiakou is the atonal pinyin romanization of the Chinese name written 張家口 in traditional characters and 张家口 in simplified ones, meaning "pass of the Zhang family". It is written Zhāngjiākǒu in tonal pinyin and was formerly romanized as Chang-chia-k'ou in Wade–Giles and as Changchiakow in Postal Map romanization. The name is a clipping of Zhangjiakoubu (张家口堡; 張家口堡; Zhāngjiākǒubǔ), "earthwork fortress of the Zhang family", named in honor of the Ming-era official Zhang Wen (张文; 張文; Zhāng Wén) who directed its construction from 1429. During China's Republican Era, the town was also known in Chinese as Zhangyuan (张垣; 張垣; Zhāngyuán), "the Zhang Wall".

Until the mid-20th century, Zhangjiakou was more often known to Europeans as Kalgan from its classical Mongolian name Qaɣalɣan (ᠬᠠᠭᠠᠯᠭᠠᠨ), meaning barrier or beam gate, but actually a shortened form of the full name Čiɣulaltu Qaɣalɣa (ᠴᠢᠭᠤᠯᠠᠯᠲᠤ
ᠬᠠᠭᠠᠯᠭ᠎ᠠ), "assembly" or "meeting gate" from its importance along Sino-Mongolian trade routes. The modern Mongolian forms of these names are Haalgan (Хаалган) and Chuulalt Haalga (Чуулалт Хаалга). The Manchu form of the name was Imiyangga Jase (ᡳᠮᡳᠶᠠᠩᡤᠠ
ᠵᠠᠰᡝ).

During the Ming dynasty, when the city was a major military outpost against the Northern Yuan, it was also known as Wucheng (武城, Wǔchéng), "Martial" or "War Town". Because of its strategic position above and northwest of Beijing, Zhangjiakou has been nicknamed "Beijing's Northern Door".

== History ==
=== Pre-Qin era ===
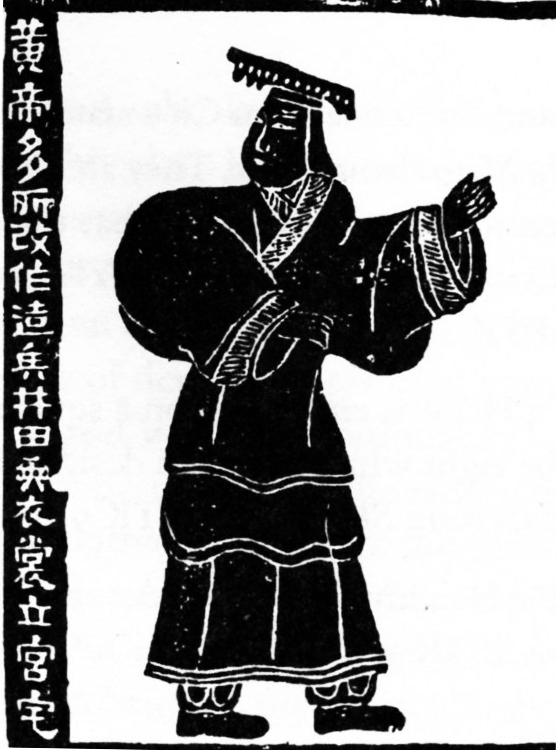
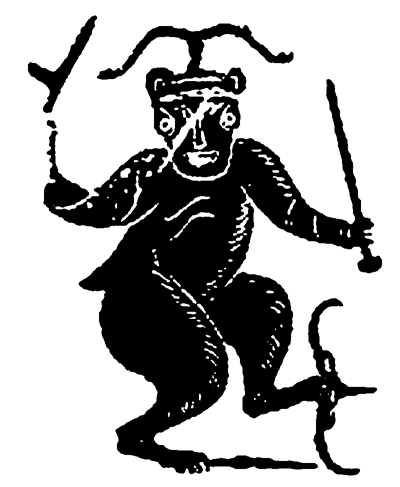
Left image: Huangdi or Yellow Emperor
Right image: Chiyou

There are many paleolithic remains in sites like Nihewan, Xiaochangliang, and Maquangou located in Guyuan county, which indicated human activities dating back possibly 2 million years ago.

Around 2500 BC, the legendary ancestors of Chinese people, Huangdi, Yandi, and Chiyou used to live in the area of Zhuolu Town, and later fought the Battle of Zhuolu and Battle of Banquan, amalgamating different tribes into a single Huaxia tribe, thus beginning Chinese history.

During Spring and Autumn period, Xiongnu and Donghu people inhabited the northern area while Yan State (since around 11th century BC) and Dai state (since 7th century BC) occupied the southern area. In 475 BC, Dai was occupied by Zhao Wuxu of Zhao State. In 300 BC, King Wuling of Zhao established Dai Commandery, managing the area of ancient Dai state with its administrative center in Dai, currently Daiwangcheng, Yu County. During the same period of time, King Zhao of Yan sent General Qin Kai who was once captured by Donghu people and thus became familiar with their tactics to defeat Donghu. Following that, Yan State built Great Wall in its border extending from Zaoyang (currently northeast of Xuanhua) to Xiangping (currently north of Liaoyang). In 283 BC, King Zhao established Shanggu Commandery. In 265 BC, Li Mu, a famous general of Zhao, commanded and deployed troops in Dai to protect against Xiongnu. After arriving in Dai, initially Li Mu banned any counterattack against Xiongnu to preserve the strength for years, which however incurred the discontent of King of Zhao. As a result, Li Mu was sacked. Following Zhao troops' defeat later, King of Zhao reinstated Li Mu. Viewing Zhao troops as cowards, Xiongnu grew arrogant and underestimated Zhao's strength. Finally, Li Mu led troops and ambushed Xiongnu, causing hundreds of thousands of casualties and great damage of Xiongnu, thus ensuring decades of peace in Zhao's borderlands.

In 228 BC, Wang Jian, a Qin general defeated Zhao army and occupied its capital, Handan. Jia, a son of Zhao king, escaped to Dai, currently northeast of Yu County and declared himself as the King of Dai. In alliance with Xi, King of Yan, the combined army, commanded by Crown Prince Dan was defeated at Yishui. In 222 BC, Wang Ben, a Qin general defeated Yan state and then, attacked Dai. He captured Jia and ended Dai as a state. Jia feared humiliation and committed suicide.

=== Qin–Han era ===
During the Qin dynasty, Shihuangdi sent Meng Tian, commanding 300,000 troops to defend his empire from Xiongnu's attacks. They spent 10 years connecting the Great Wall of Yan, Qin and Zhao, thus building Great Wall of Qin, the first Great Wall of 10,000 li, its 80-kilometer-long relics currently located in Batou (坝头), or Erdaogou (二道沟) in local slang, to the north of Zhangjiakou downtown area. The southern area of Zhangjiakou was under jurisdiction of Dai Commandery and Shanggu Commandery.

During the Han dynasty, most part of the area belonged to You Prefecture while some parts belonged to Wuhuan, Xiongnu and Xianbei. When Liu Bang established the Han dynasty, he granted Dai and the title of King of Dai to his brother Liu Zhong in 201 BC. One year later, Liu Zhong was defeated by Modu Chanyu of Xiongnu and escaped, thus demoted. In 196 BC, Chen Xi, the chancellor of Zhao, rebelled against the emperor and occupied more than 20 cities soon after. As a result, Liu Bang commanded an army in person from Luoyang. During the war, the empress launched a coup d'état and killed Han Xin, the most important general who helped establish the Han dynasty. With the help of Fan Kuai and Zhou Bo, Liu Bang defeated Chen Xi very soon. Following the rebellion, Liu Bang granted the title of King of Dai to his third son, Liu Heng, later Emperor Wen of Han.

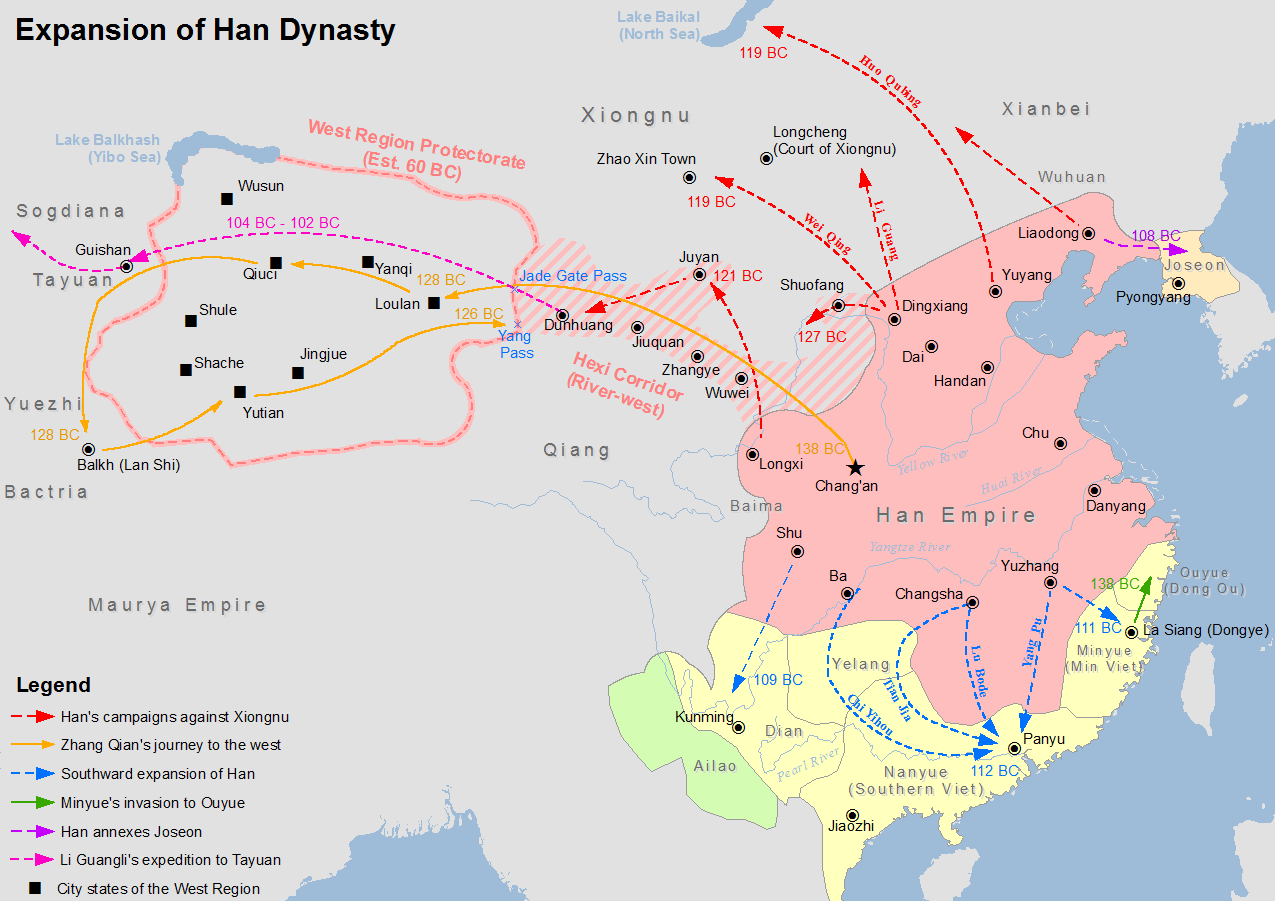
Expansion of Han dynasty. Wei Qing's campaigns against Xiongnu is shown in red arrows.

Zhangjiakou was a major battleground during Han–Xiongnu War. In 127 BC, Xiongnu cavalry attacked Shanggu (currently Huailai), Yuyang. The Emperor Wu of Han launched a successful counterattack. In 124 BC, Xiongnu cavalry invaded Dai Commandery. Emperor Wu ordered Wei Qing commanding 100,000 troops to counterattack. Wei Qing left the Great Wall more than 600 to 700 kilometers, encircled Xiongnu's head, Youxianwang (右贤王). In 122 BC, 50,000 Xiongnu invaded Shanggu, killed hundreds of people. In next March, Huo Qubing commanded 10,000 cavalry to counterattack and achieved success. In 119 BC, Wei Qing and Huo Qubing each commanded 50,000 cavalry. Huo Qubing departed from Dai Commandery, marched 2000 li northward crossing Gobi desert. Finally, Han troops defeated Xiongnu under Yizhixie completely. Following the success, a new office, the Colonel-Protector of the Wuhuan (护乌桓校尉), was established in Shanggu in order to prevent contact between the Wuhuan with the Xiongnu and to use them to monitor the Xiongnu activities. In 106 BC, Emperor Wu of Han organized the Western Han dynasty into 13 province-sized prefectures, each administered by a cishi (刺史) or inspector, thus putting Shanggu and Dai under the jurisdiction of You Prefecture.

Following the Xin dynasty, Lu Fang (卢芳) rebelled against Han but was defeated. Then, Emperor Guangwu of Han granted him the King of Dai. In 48 AD, the Eastern Han dynasty established Colonel-Protector of the Wuhuan in Ningcheng (宁城), Shanggu (currently, Ningyuanbao Qiaodong District), representing Han's management of Wuhuan. Meanwhile, Han also opened Hu Market (胡市) to conduct regular exchanges with Wuhuan in Ningcheng. From 110 AD, Ningcheng also began to manage affairs with Xianbei.

=== Jin–Sui era ===
In 274, Western Jin divided Shanggu Commandery and established Guangning Commandery (廣寧郡) in Xialuo (下洛, in the west of present Zhuolu), which was disestablished during Northern Qi.

During the period known as Sixteen Kingdoms in Chinese history when the northern China was repeatedly invaded and occupied various nomadic peoples from further north, Zhangjiakou area became part of Dai, Former Yan, ultimately ruled by Northern Wei of Xianbei. In 310, by helping Jin's Liu Kun, the governor of Bingzhou to fight Xiongnu state of Han Zhao, Tuoba Yilu, the supreme chieftain of the Tuoba, was appointed Duke of Dai by Western Jin and since 315, the King of Dai. In 376, Dai was conquered by Former Qin state.

Former Qin fell into disarray in 383 following its defeat by Jin forces at the Battle of Fei River. In 386, Tuoba Gui, the grandson of Tuoba Shiyiqian, the last King of Dai, took the opportunity to reestablish Dai and soon changed its name from Dai to Wei. Initially, Tuoba Gui was a vassal of Later Yan but claimed imperial title in 397 after defeating Murong Bao of Yan in Battle of Canhe Slope. Later, Tuoba Gui was given the title of Emperor Daowu of Northern Wei.

In 423, in order to defend itself from Rouran's invasions, Northern Wei built a Great Wall from Chicheng to the east and Wuyuan to the West, and established Huaihuang (懷荒, in present Zhangbei), Rouxuan (柔玄, in present Shangyi), Woye (沃野, in present Wuyuan County, Inner Mongolia) as two of the Six Frontier Towns. Later on, Yuyi (御夷, in present Chicheng and Guyuan ) was added. In 523, an uprising happened in Huaihuang, thus starting the Rebellion of Six Frontier Towns, an anti-Sinicization movement among northern peoples. In 525, Du Luozhou (杜洛周) led Shanggu Uprising, leading to many similar uprising to respond, including Gao Huan's. Next year, Du Luozhou broke through Juyong Pass and occupied You Prefecture.

=== Tang–Song era ===
In 645, Taizong of Tang had a north march in Jiming Mountain (鸡鸣山) during his campaign against Xueyantuo. In 822, Tang established Longmen County (龍門縣份) and Huai'an County (懷安縣), thus the first appearance of Huai’an. In 866. Tang established Xinzhou (新州), the administrative center located to the west of Zhuolu. In 877, Li Keyong, the grandfather of Li Cunxu, later the emperor of Later Tang, was serving as the deputy commander of the Shatuo troops and stationed in Yuzhou, turning this place into his base for future struggles. In 899, Wuzhou (武州) was established with its administrative center in Xuanhua. Meanwhile, Wende County (文德縣) was established, the administrative center in present Xuanhua.

During the period of Five Dynasties, Zhangjiakou area, like other places in northern China, underwent repeated changes of rules of different dynasties. In 937, in order to enlist the help from Khitan people to defeat Later Tang, Shi Jingtang of Later Jin (Five Dynasties) agreed to cede Sixteen Prefectures to Khitan, later Liao dynasty, in which Xinzhou (新州, present Zhuolu), Weizhou (妫州, Huailai), Wuzhou (武州), Yuzhou (蔚州) were included. The Sixteen Prefectures held strategic locations in the north and because the Great Wall was across Zhangjiakou area, the cession left China in a vulnerable position against the invasions from the north. In 951, Yelu Ruan, the Emperor Shizong of Liao intended to attack Later Zhou in the south despite the reluctance of many subordinate tribes. While passing Huoshendian (火神淀), the west of Xinzhou, a rebellion broke out and Yelu Gecha (耶律察割) and Yelu Pendu (耶律盆都) assassinated the drunken emperor. The rebellion was put down quickly by Shizong's successor, Yelu Jing, the Emperor Muzong of Liao.

During the reign of Emperor Jingzong of Liao, the empress Xiao Yanyan often took part in politics and war. She often stationed troops in Yanzicheng (燕子城present Zhangbei), the name of which is believed to derive from Xiao Yanyan in preparations for the War against Song. Attracted by the beautiful scenery in Zhangjiakou area, she built two royal gardens, Shanghuayuan (上花園; 'Upper Garden') and Xiahuayuan (下花園; 'Lower Garden', in present Xiahuayuan District). Xiao resided there often and enlisted many talent in his war with the Song dynasty.

In 1168, the Emperor Shizong of Jin traveled to Helihudongchuan (曷里滸東东川). Seeing the fully blossoming yellow flowers, he named the yellow flowers Jinlianhua (金蓮花) and the place became Jinlianchuan (金蓮川; 'River of Golden Lotus').

=== Yuan–Ming–Qing era ===
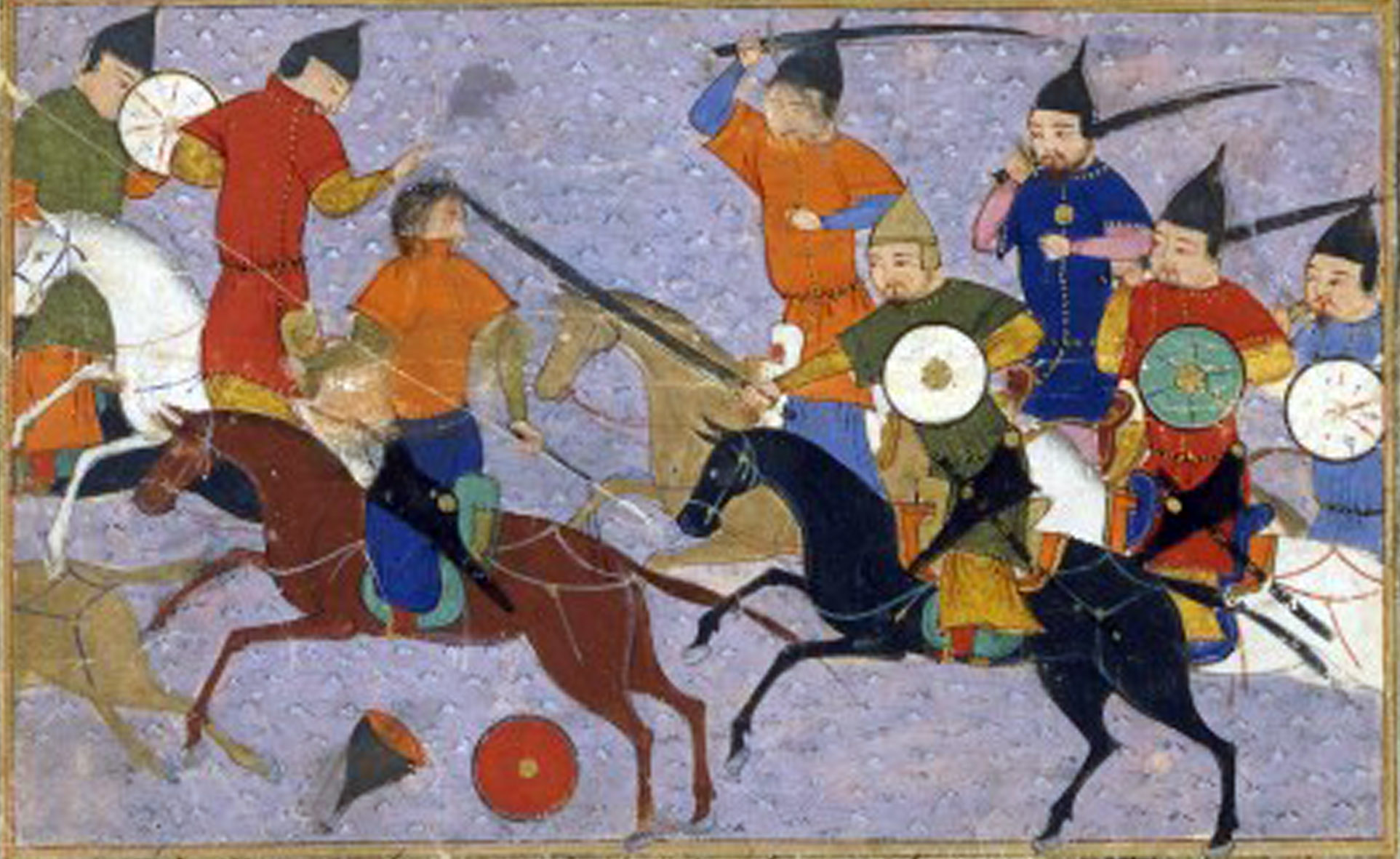
Battle of Yehuling of 1211, the decisive battle between Mongols and Jin dynasty, leading to the ultimate conquest of northern China.

In August 1211, during the Battle of Yehuling, Genghis Khan's 90,000 strong force destroyed the 450,000 strong Jin dynasty army. In 1251, Möngke Khan became the Khagan of the Mongol Empire. He put Kublai, his brother, in charge of affairs of northern China. Kublai established Jinlianchuan Mufu (金蓮川幕府), enlisting many talent of Han people like Liu Bingzhong to assist his governance. Kublai regularly consulted them and discussed politics, religion ranging from Confucianism, Taoism and Buddhism.

In 1307, Külüg Khan or the Emperor Wuzong of Yuan began the construction of Yuan Zhongdu (元中都) in Onggachatu (旺兀察都, north to present Zhangbei) where the court was moved. However, before full completion, Emperor Wuzong died soon and his successor Wuzong's brother, Emperor Renzong of Yuan called it off. In August 1329, during Tianli Incident following the War of the Two Capitals, the new emperor Khutughtu Khan Kusala was poisoned to death by El Temür in Zhongdu. Zhongdu was later destroyed in 1357 during the Red Turban Rebellion as the rebels marched towards Shangdu.

In 1370, Zhu Yuanzhang ordered his general, Tang He, to occupy Xuande (宣德), later changed to Xuanfu (宣府), Hua Yunlong to occupy Yunzhou (雲州), seated in the north of Chicheng. Xuanfu was one of the Nine Garrisons of the Ming dynasty. In order to defend China proper from invasions from the north, Ming emperors, especially Yongle Emperor (who sent the fleet of Zheng He journeying as far as East Africa) put great emphasis on the building of defensive forces in northern China, where most troops were deployed in Xuanfu, reaching 151 thousand during 1403 to 1424. Fighting Mongols, Yongle Emperor's campaigns against the Mongols mainly took place to the north of Zhangjiakou. In 1429, the official Zhang Wen began fortifying the city, which was subsequently renamed in his honor.

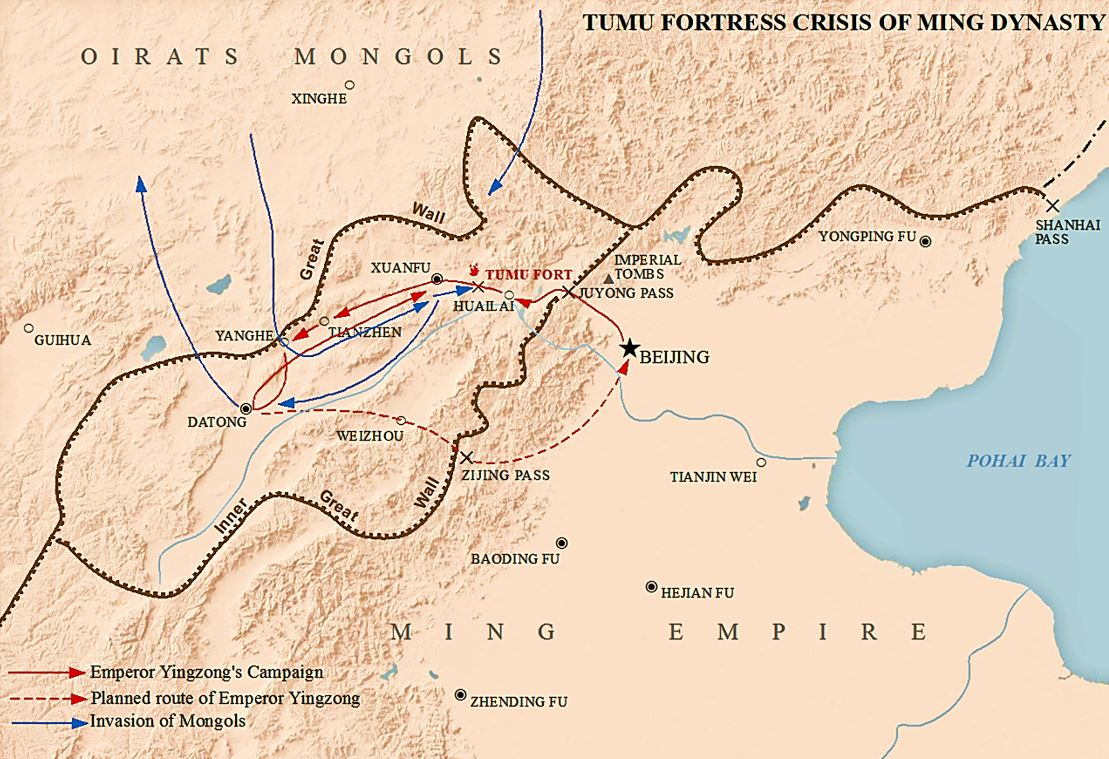
Tumu Crisis

On September 1, 1449, while retreating from the campaign against Mongols (Oirats), the 500,000-man army was defeated and the Emperor Yingzong of Ming was captured by chasing Mongolian troops in Huailai County, which was later called Tumu Crisis. The Emperor was sent back next year but only restored his throne in 1457. In 1529, local officer Zhang Zhen (张珍) built a small gate to north, which was strengthen in 1574 and 1581. Zhangjiakoubu enjoyed a paramount strategic position, thus being called Wuheng (武城; 'Martial Town'). Therefore, Zhangjiakoubu was the origin and starting point of modern-day Zhangjiakou City.

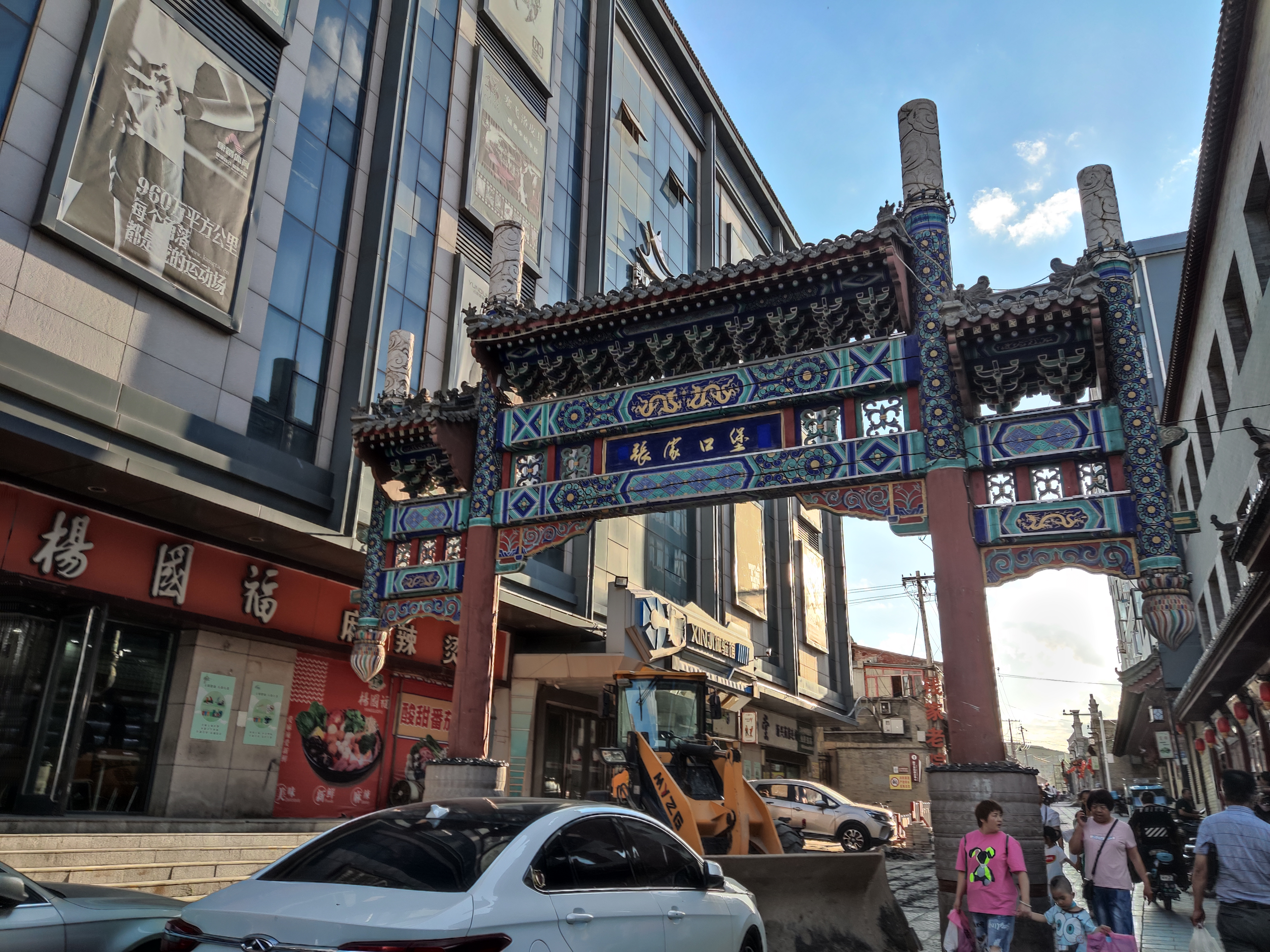
Zhangjiakoubu is the origin of today's Zhangjiakou City

In 1514 and 1517, Dayan Khan led Mongol troops to invade China, causing great damage. He built forts in Xuanhua and Datong and stationed 15000 troops on Ming territory. Culminating in the Battle of Yingzhou in 1517, Dayan Khan was killed in the battle. From 1545, Xuanda Governor Weng Wanda (宣大總督翁萬達) began building Xuanfu Great Wall, reaching 462 li (231 km) next year. In 1545, he built Great Walls again, reaching 169 li (84.5 km), effectively defending the area of Mongol cavalry's invasion.

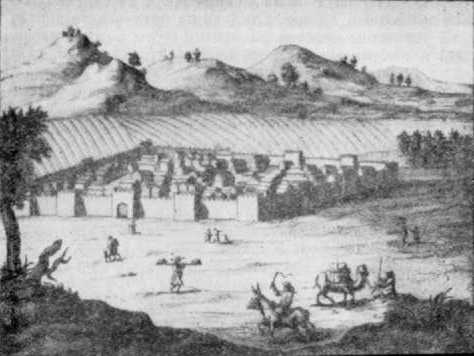
View of Zhangjiakou ("Kalgan") in 1698

In 1571, Altan Khan of Mongols received the title "Prince of Shunyi" (Obedient and Righteous Prince) from the Longqing Emperor, thus reaching an agreement of lasting peace with Ming. Since then, the city of Zhangjiakou was transformed from a military base to an important horse market for Mongolian mounts imported into China. The water-scarce city was historically the chief northern gate in the Great Wall to China for Europeans travelling along the Northern Tea Road through Juyong Pass, including Ivan Petlin in 1619 and Nicolae Milescu. From 1727 it was an important station for the Kyakhta trade between Russia and China. In early autumn long lines of camels would come in from all quarters for the conveyance of the tea chests from Zhangjiakou to Kyakhta across the Gobi Desert. Each caravan usually made three journeys in the winter. In the 19th century, the town had an estimated population of 70–100,000 and some Russian merchants had permanent residences and warehouses just outside the gate.

=== Modern history ===
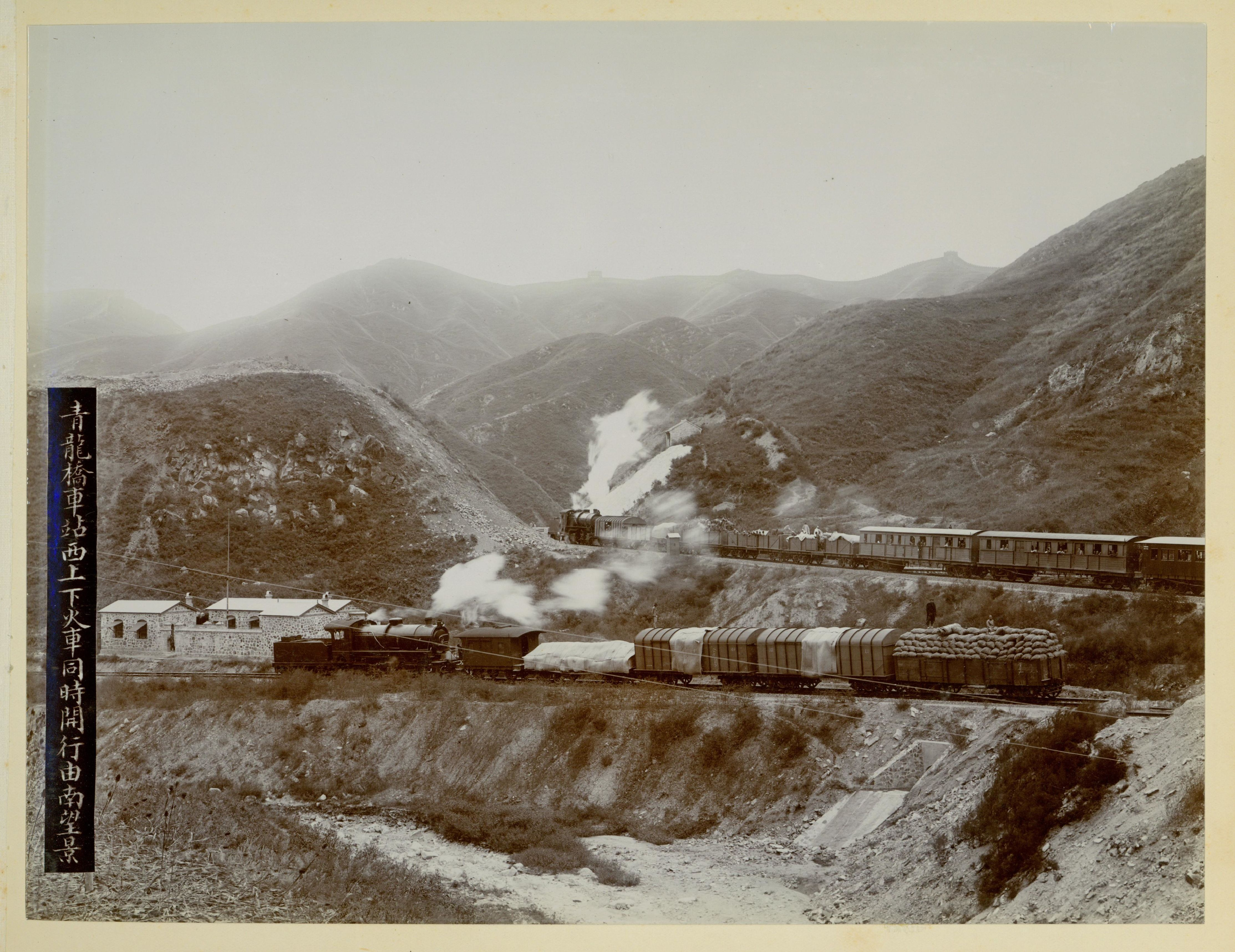
Two trains passing the Qinglongqiao Station on the Beijing-Zhangjiakou Railway

In October 1909, Zhangjiakou was connected with Beijing by Beijing-Zhangjiakou Railway, the first railway solely designed and built by Chinese people. Zhan Tianyou was the chief engineer. The 1911 Encyclopædia Britannica noted that, in Kalgan, "the ordinary houses have an unusual appearance, from the fact that they are mostly roofed with earth and become covered with green-sward" and that "on the way to Peking the road passes over a beautiful bridge of seven arches, ornamented with marble figures of animals". Following Xinhai Revolution, Zhangjiakou was incorporated into Chahar Special Administrative Region, later changed to Chahar Province in 1928, after the success of Northern Expedition of Kuomintang.

In 1937, the Japanese occupied the region and made Kalgan the capital of the autonomous Cha-nan (South Chahar) Province. The Federated Mengjiang Commission was set up to supervise the economic affairs, banking, communications, and industry of Japanese-occupied Inner Mongolia (Mengjiang).

During the second phase of the Chinese Civil War, The 35th Army under Fu Zuoyi was surrounded at Xinbao'an of Zhangjiakou and defeated. This caused Fu Zuo Yi to quickly strike a deal with the Communists and make peace.

In the early 1960s, at the height of Sino-Soviet tensions, Zhangjiakou was considered one of the most important cities in China for military strategy reasons. Zhangjiakou was aptly nicknamed, "Beijing's Northern Door", because whoever controlled Zhangjiakou was in a good position to either attack (in the case of the Soviets) or defend (in the case of the Chinese) Beijing.

Zhangjiakou hosted some of the events in the 2022 Winter Olympics.

== Tourism ==
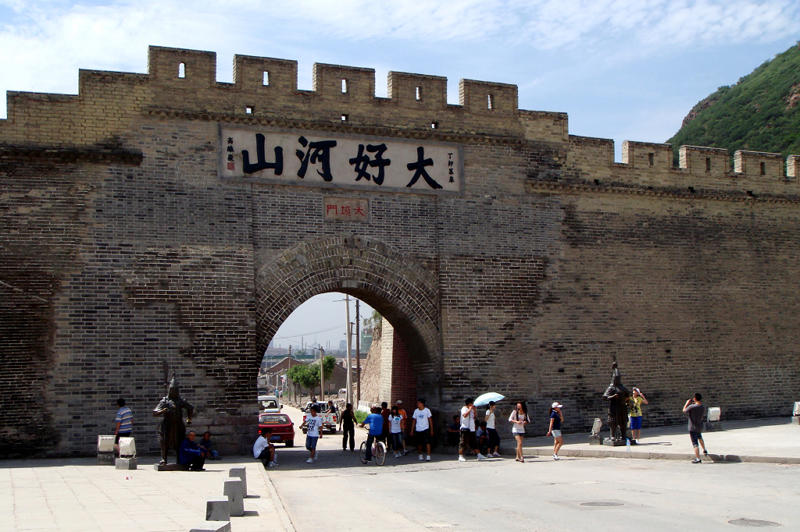
Dajingmen, a gate of Great Wall built around 1644

Lying in between the Mongolian Plateau and the North China Plain, Zhangjiakou has a somewhat rugged topography characterized by high mountains, deep valleys, and rocky pathways. As a result, it serves as a perfect natural screen for Beijing, which has made it a strategic priority militarily since ancient times. It is called "The Gateway to Beijing" and "The Mountain City beyond the Great Wall". The grand Yan Mountain, the towering Taihang Mountain, the vast grasslands, and the meandering Sangyang River converge here. The city government has regarded tourism as a major driving force of the city's economy and continues to develop the industry.

As a place where water resources for Beijing is located, ecological and sustainable development have been emphasized by local government. Due to its less impact on environment than heavy industry, tourism figures significantly in local policies of development. Possessing diverse landforms, such as plains, hills, mountains, basins and grasslands, Zhangjiakou is an ideal place for holidays, entertainment sightseeing for middle class citizens and can provide tourists with a variety of experiences. In the area, there are significant differences in different seasons. In winter, tourists can ski in Chongli Mountains; in spring, they can visit historical sites; in summer, visitors can sleep in Mongolian yurts on Zhangbei Grassland, where annual musical events were held and taste fresh mutton; while in autumn, visitors can taste Huailai wine and take a bath in nearby hot springs.

In today's Zhangbei county a major attraction are the ruins and museum of the former Yuan capital Zhongdu.

== Geography ==
Zhangjiakou is located in the northwest part of Hebei province, and is defined by mostly rough terrain created by the Yin Mountains, with elevations increasing from southeast to northwest. The east of the prefecture marks the Yan Mountains The bordering prefectures in the province are Chengde to the northeast and Baoding to the south. It also borders Shanxi to the west and southwest and Inner Mongolia to the northwest. The prefecture's latitude ranges from 39° 30' to 42° 10' N, or 289.2 kilometres (179.7 mi), while its longitude spans 113° 50' to 116° 30' E, or 216.2 kilometres (134.3 mi).

Zhangjiakou City is divided into three topographical regions: plateau, mountains, and basin. The former has elevations generally above 1,400 metres (4,600 ft), and consists of all of Guyuan and Kangbao Counties as well as part of Shangyi and Zhangbei Counties. This area is part of the southern end of the Inner Mongolia Plateau (内蒙古高原) and accounts for one-third of the prefecture's area. The basin area has elevations of 500 to 1,000 metres (1,600 to 3,300 ft) and supports a few rivers.

The urban area of Zhangjiakou is surrounded by mountains on three sides. The Qingshui River passes through the city, dividing the city into two districts, Qiaodong District and Qiaoxi District.

=== Climate ===
Zhangjiakou has a monsoon-influenced, continental semi-arid climate (Köppen BSk), with long, cold, dry, and windy winters due to the Siberian anticyclone, and hot, humid summers driven by the East Asian monsoon; in between spring and autumn are dry and brief. Conditions are much cooler than in Beijing due in part to the elevation. The monthly 24-hour average temperature ranges from −8.1 °C (17.4 °F) in January to 24.2 °C (75.6 °F) in July, and the annual mean is 9.2 °C (48.6 °F).

Climate data for Zhangjiakou, elevation 773 m (2,536 ft), (1991–2020 normals, extremes 1971–present)
Month	Jan	Feb	Mar	Apr	May	Jun	Jul	Aug	Sep	Oct	Nov	Dec	Year
Record high °C (°F)	9.8 (49.6)	18.2 (64.8)	27.0 (80.6)	33.3 (91.9)	37.0 (98.6)	39.4 (102.9)	41.1 (106.0)	37.2 (99.0)	35.9 (96.6)	27.7 (81.9)	20.8 (69.4)	14.0 (57.2)	41.1 (106.0)
Mean daily maximum °C (°F)	−2.1 (28.2)	2.6 (36.7)	9.9 (49.8)	18.5 (65.3)	25.0 (77.0)	28.9 (84.0)	30.1 (86.2)	28.7 (83.7)	24.0 (75.2)	16.3 (61.3)	6.7 (44.1)	−0.7 (30.7)	15.7 (60.2)
Daily mean °C (°F)	−8.0 (17.6)	−4.0 (24.8)	3.1 (37.6)	11.4 (52.5)	18.2 (64.8)	22.3 (72.1)	24.3 (75.7)	22.7 (72.9)	17.3 (63.1)	9.6 (49.3)	0.7 (33.3)	−6.3 (20.7)	9.3 (48.7)
Mean daily minimum °C (°F)	−12.4 (9.7)	−9.0 (15.8)	−2.6 (27.3)	5.1 (41.2)	11.7 (53.1)	16.5 (61.7)	19.3 (66.7)	17.8 (64.0)	11.9 (53.4)	4.5 (40.1)	−3.7 (25.3)	−10.5 (13.1)	4.1 (39.3)
Record low °C (°F)	−26.8 (−16.2)	−21.9 (−7.4)	−16.5 (2.3)	−7.7 (18.1)	−1.3 (29.7)	5.1 (41.2)	12.5 (54.5)	7.2 (45.0)	1.1 (34.0)	−9.1 (15.6)	−17.5 (0.5)	−22.2 (−8.0)	−26.8 (−16.2)
Average precipitation mm (inches)	2.5 (0.10)	3.1 (0.12)	9.1 (0.36)	20.3 (0.80)	37.9 (1.49)	66.3 (2.61)	101.9 (4.01)	78.1 (3.07)	57.5 (2.26)	24.8 (0.98)	8.7 (0.34)	2.7 (0.11)	412.9 (16.25)
Average precipitation days (≥ 0.1 mm)	1.7	2.4	3.7	5.0	7.9	11.2	11.8	10.8	8.6	5.2	2.9	1.8	73
Average snowy days	2.8	3.7	3.7	1.2	0	0	0	0	0	0.3	3.1	2.5	17.3
Average relative humidity (%)	43	39	36	35	38	51	62	63	57	50	47	44	47
Mean monthly sunshine hours	193.8	194.3	231.9	251.0	275.2	249.9	244.6	249.1	227.2	217.3	183.3	178.8	2,696.4
Percentage possible sunshine	65	64	62	63	61	56	54	59	62	64	62	62	61
Source 1: China Meteorological Administration all-time extreme temperature all-time May high
Source 2: Weather China

== Administrative divisions ==
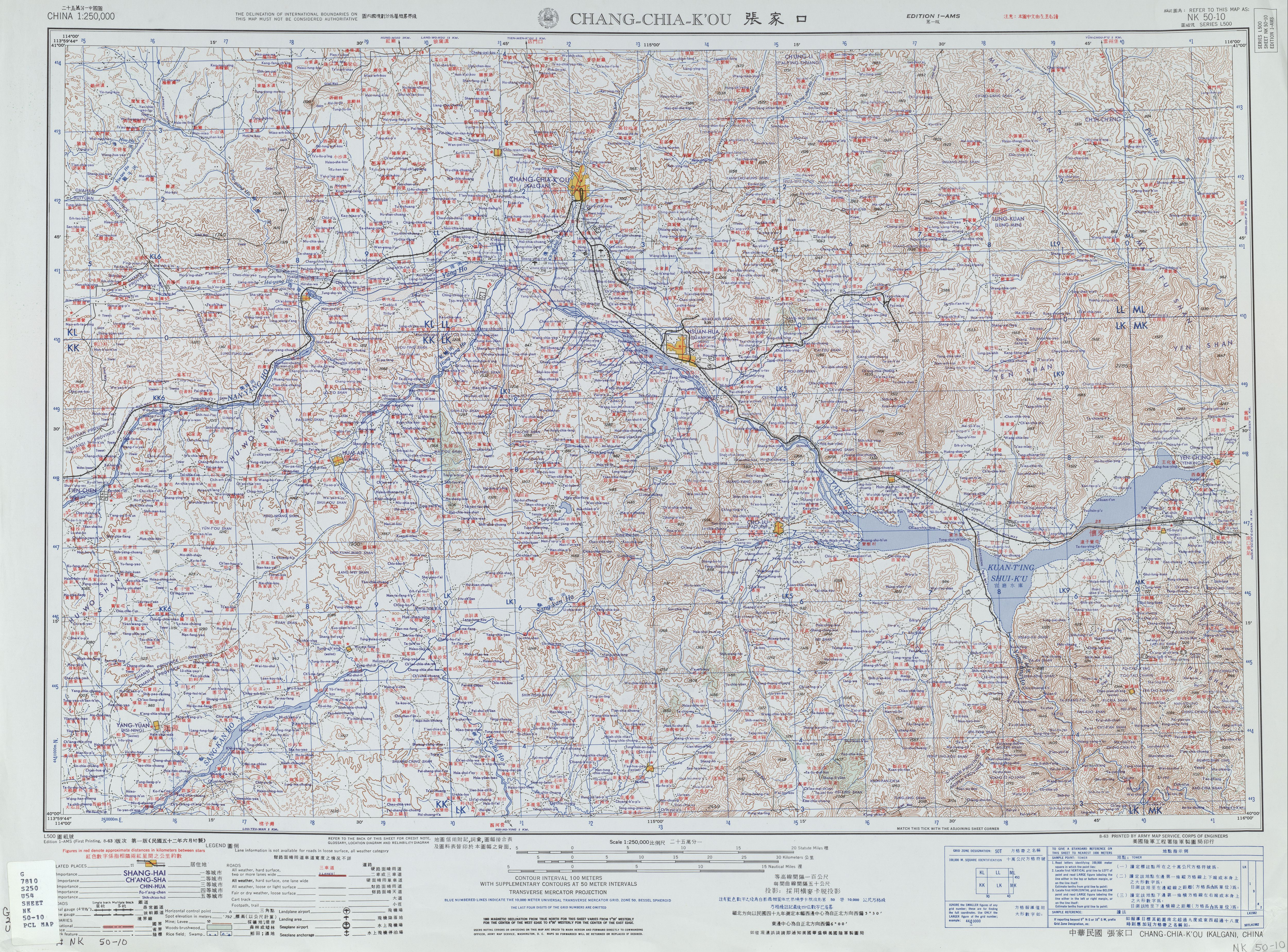
Map including Zhangjiakou (labeled as CHANG-CHIA-K'OU (KALGAN) 張家口) (AMS, 1963)

Map
Name	Hanzi	Hanyu Pinyin	Population (2020 census)	Area (km^{2})
Districts
Qiaodong District	桥东区	Qiáodōng Qū	422,753	113
Qiaoxi District	桥西区	Qiáoxī Qū	393,227	141
Xuanhua District	宣化区	Xuānhuà Qū	542,358	2,371
Xiahuayuan District	下花园区	Xiàhuāyuán Qū	64,216	315
Wanquan District	万全区	Wànquán Qū	216,795	1,158
Chongli District	崇礼区	Chónglǐ Qū	105,501	2,326
Counties
Zhangbei County	张北县	Zhāngběi Xiàn	325,795	4,232
Kangbao County	康保县	Kāngbǎo Xiàn	138,205	3,365
Guyuan County	沽源县	Gūyuán Xiàn	167,587	3,601
Shangyi County	尚义县	Shàngyì Xiàn	104,247	2,621
Yu County	蔚县	Yù Xiàn	411,824	3,216
Yangyuan County	阳原县	Yángyuán Xiàn	205,773	1,834
Huai'an County	怀安县	Huái'ān Xiàn	179,949	1,706
Huailai County	怀来县	Huáilái Xiàn	348,746	1,793
Zhuolu County	涿鹿县	Zhuōlù Xiàn	294,013	2,799
Chicheng County	赤城县	Chìchéng Xiàn	197,919	5,238

== Economy ==
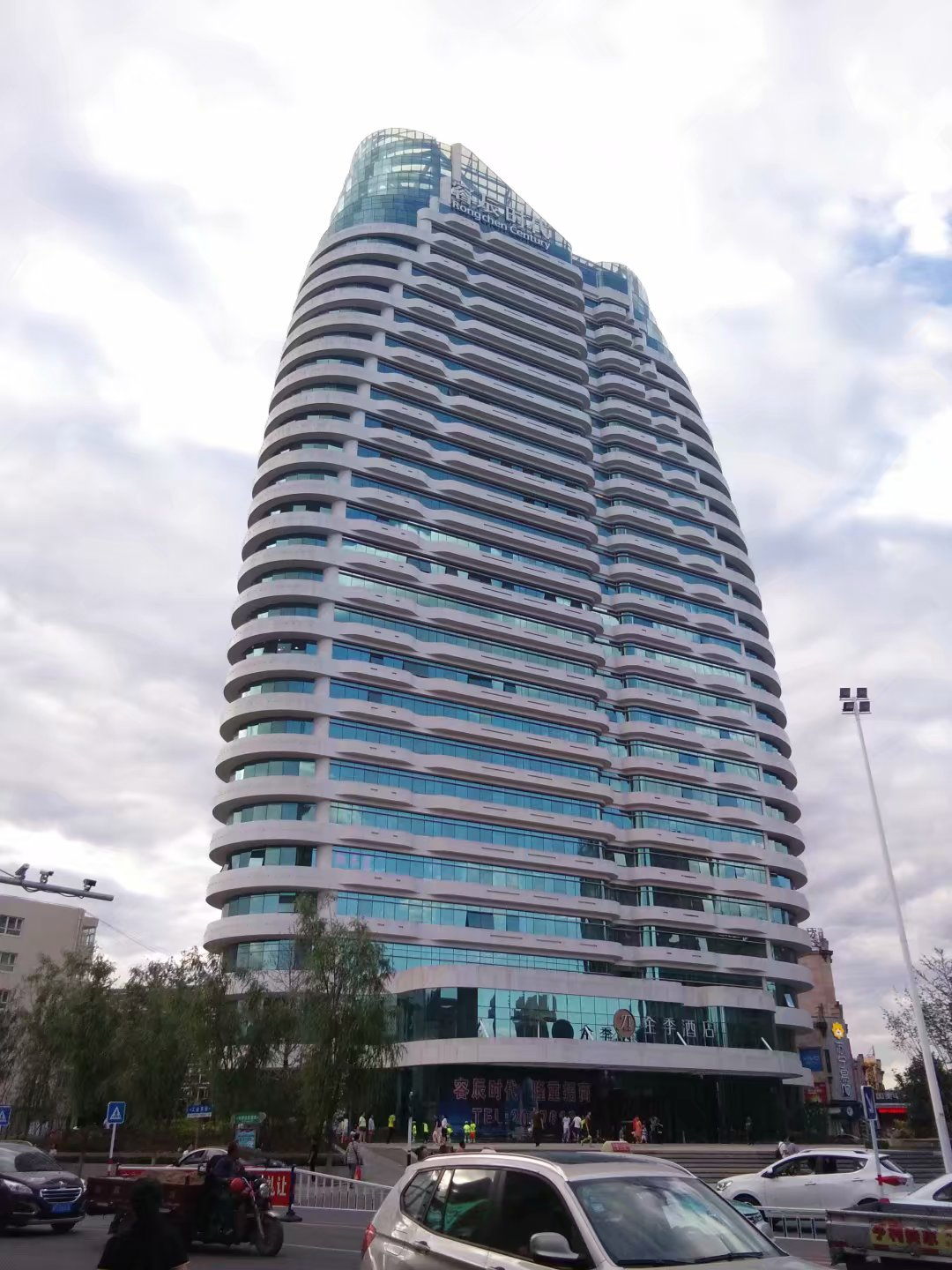
Rongchen Century Building in downtown Zhangjiakou

The vicinity of Zhangjiakou is rich in coal and iron ore, making it an ideal location for developing iron and steel industry. Apart from metallurgy, the city is home to one of China's most important grape wine industries, with the Great Wall Wine Company being located in Shacheng, Huailai County.

Due to its comparatively late implementation Reform and Opening policies, the scale of foreign investment in Zhangjiakou is not quite large. Currently, there are approximately 130 foreign companies settled. The amount of investment reached 820 million US dollars. The largest one is Zhangjiakou Volvo Motor Company with investment amounting to 3.1 billion RMB, and value of output exceeding 1 billion RMB. In 2022, Volvo Cars' powertrain plant at Zhangjiakou was transferred to Aurobay, a joint venture between Volvo Cars and Geely.

Due to several factors including the hosting of 2022 Winter Olympic Games with its concomitant expansion of infrastructure, the opening of high-speed railway in December 2019, the national strategy of coordinated development of Beijing-Tianjin-Hebei, the ratification of building a national demonstration zone of renewable energy by State Council of the People's Republic of China, Zhangjiakou economy is expected to undergo unprecedented advance in the coming years.

== Transportation ==
- The city lies in the northwestern corner of the province and is linked to Datong in Shanxi by the Xuanda Expressway and to Beijing by means of the Jingzhang Expressway.
- Zhangjiakou is further linked by a freeway to Inner Mongolia which opened on September 7, 2005.
- China National Highway 207
- A heavy-haul railway is under construction, to transport coal from Zhangjiakou to Tangshan. Construction is expected to finish in 2015; the railway is planned to carry 200 million tons of coal per year. Another heavy-haul railway, Junggar-Zhangjiakou, is expected to connect to it.
- Beijing-Zhangjiakou Intercity Railway opened in December 2019, shortening the traveling time from Beijing to Zhangjiakou from 3 hours 7 minutes to 47 minutes .
- Flights to Guangzhou, Shanghai, Shenzhen, Shijiazhuang, and Xiamen are available at Zhangjiakou Ningyuan Airport.

== Military ==
Zhangjiakou is headquarters of the 65th Group Army of the People's Liberation Army, one of the three group armies that comprise the Beijing Military Region responsible for defending China's capital.

== Education ==
Zhangjiakou is home to Hebei North University. The university has been improving its international network and many foreign students are now studying there. It is most popular amongst foreign students due to its faculty of medicine and MBBS program. Another university Hebei University of Architecture is located in Qiaodong District. Zhangjiakou No.1 Middle School is the most famous secondary school in Zhangjiakou. Beijing No.101 Middle School was a branch of Zhangjiakou No.1 Middle School in the past.

== Sports ==
Location of the 2022 Winter Olympics clusters

Zhangjiakou hosted Freestyle and Nordic skiing and snowboarding excluding big air for the 2022 Winter Olympics. The events were held in a venue in Taizicheng, a village in Chongli District. The ski resort earned over 1.54 billion yuan (US$237.77 million) in tourism during the 2015–16 snow season for a 31.6% growth over the previous season. The snow season lasted for five months from November, during which Chongli has hosted thirty-six competitions and activities, such as Far East Cup and Children Skiing International Festival. A total of twenty-three skiing camps were set up, attracting the participation of 3,800 youths.

Venues currently being constructed are:

- Kuyangshu Nordic Center and Biathlon Center – cross-country skiing, Nordic combined (cross-country skiing) 15,000
- Kuyangshu Ski Jumping Field – ski jumping, Nordic combined (ski jumping) 10,000
- Hualindong Ski Resort – biathlon 15,000
- Genting Hotel – Media Center
- Genting Snow Park – snowboarding (slopestyle, halfpipe), freestyle skiing 5,000
- Thaiwoo Ski Resort – snowboarding (cross), freestyle skiing 10,000
- Wanlong Ski Resort – snowboarding (parallel slalom) 5,000
- Zhangjiakou Olympic Village

== See also ==
- Battle of Zhuolu
