= Beijing–Zhangjiakou Railway =

Historic railway line in China

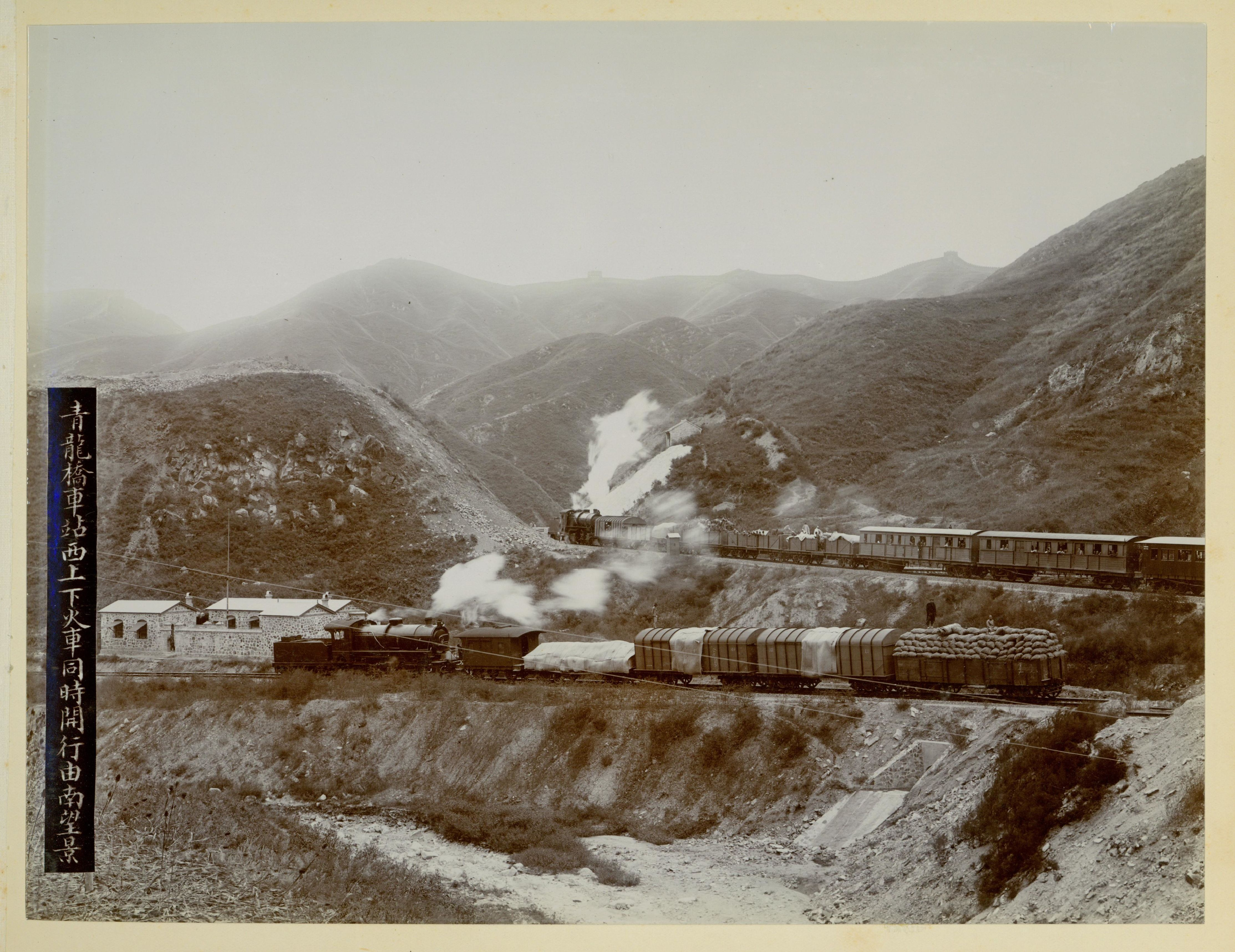
- Two trains with Mallet locomotives passing the Qinglongqiao Station on the Beijing-Zhangjiakou Railway

Overview
- Status: Operational
- Locale: PRC
- Termini: Liucun; Zhangjiakou
- Stations: Beijing North railway station Badaling railway station Shalingzi West railway station

Service
- Type: Regular rail; Freight rail
- System: National Rail
- Operator: China Railway

History
- Opened: 1909

Technical
- Line length: 201.2 kilometres (125.0 mi)
- Number of tracks: Double track
- Track gauge: 4 ft 8 1/2 in (1,435 mm) standard gauge

The Beijing–Zhangjiakou Railway or Jingzhang Railway (Chinese: 京张铁路; pinyin: Jīngzhāng Tiělù), also known as the Imperial Peking–Kalgan Railway, is China's first railway that has been designed and built solely by Chinese, situated in the nation's capital Beijing and Zhangjiakou City in Hebei Province. It was built in 1905–1909 under the proposal of Viceroy of Zhili Yuan Shikai and Assistant Director-General of Railways Hu Yufen (胡燏棻), with Zhan Tianyou as engineer-in-chief. When building the railway, Zhan reduced the length of Badaling Tunnel by using a switchback—or “人”-shaped rail track called in China as the shape of it resembles the Chinese character “人” (pinyin: rén; literally: people); he also used vertical shafts to facilitate the excavation of the tunnel.

The railway formally opened in 1909, with a total length of 201.2 km (125.0 mi). Starting from Liucun Village in Fengtai, it connected Beijing to Zhangjiakou via the Guan'gou Valley with 14 stations, 4 tunnels and 125 bridges. In 1912, four stations with passing loops were built in the Guan'gou section. The railway was merged into Beijing-Suiyuan Railway in 1916, and later into Beijing-Baotou Railway after the founding of People's Republic of China (PRC).

The rail tracks located within the city area of Beijing were gradually dismantled to meet the need of urban traffic. In 1995, the former Xizhimen Station was designated as a Major Historical and Cultural Site of Beijing, and in 2013, the section between Nankou and Badaling was listed as Major Historical and Cultural Site Protected at the National Level.

== History ==
=== Background ===
In the late 19th century, railways and mining became a focus for Western powers in their colonial endeavours in China. In 1895, the Guangxu Emperor issued an imperial edict, claiming to carry out a national reform through a variety of measures, of which railway construction was considered a top priority. Britain and Russia thus began competing for the power to build railways in North China, but the Qing government rejected both of them in 1898. Around a year later, in 1899, Kinder, the British engineer-in-chief of the Imperial Railways of North China (关内外铁路), carried out preliminary surveying in areas between Beijing and Zhangjiakou, and that led to the rivalry between Britain and Russia for the control of Inner Mongolia. Russia made a request to the Qing government for approval to build the railway, but was refused.

On June 1, 1899, Russia forced the Qing government to make a commitment that it would consult Russia or Russian companies beforehand in the event that companies from any third country wanted to build railways in the north of Beijing or Northeast China.

After the Siege of the International Legations, the Qing government and Britain signed Regulations on Britain Returning the Imperial Railways of North China (《英国交还铁路章程》) and Regulations on Following the Returning of the Imperial Railways of North China (《关内外铁路交还以后章程》), which excluded any third country from building railways in areas within 80 miles in the north and south of the Shanhai Pass and between Fengtai and the Great Wall in the north. That led to objections from Russia and France, which made representations to the Qing government about the latter Regulations. Ultimately, it was agreed that no foreign capital would be used to build railways in the north of Beijing, including the railway between Beijing and Zhangjiakou, and neither the railways, if built, nor the revenue made from the railways would be transferred to foreign countries as collateral.

=== Planning ===
In 1905, Viceroy of Zhili Yuanshikai and Assistant Director-General of Railways Hu Yufen submitted a memorial to the throne, asking for approval to build the Beijing–Zhangjiakou Railway. The project was expected to take 4 years at a cost of 5 million taels of silver. The Imperial Railways of North China would contribute 1 million taels of silver annually to the budget and in return, receive 800,000 taels of silver per year from the Boxer Indemnities. The proposal was approved in February the same year.

Based on the recommendation of Liang Dunyan (梁敦彦), Yuan Shikai chose Zhan Tianyou as the chief engineer. In May the same year, the Qing government appointed Chen Zhaochang (陈昭常) as the director-general of the Beijing–Zhangjiakou Railway and Zhan Tianyou as the assistant director-general and chief engineer. Meanwhile, the Beijing–Zhangjiakou Railway Administration was established in Tianjin, and a branch office was opened in Fuchengmen, Beijing. Zhan Tianyou soon led two Chinese graduates of railway engineering Xu Wenhui (徐文洄) and Zhang Honggao (张鸿诰) to carry out the surveying They started in Liucun Village, and proceeded in Nankou, Guan’gou, and Badaling. On May 31, they reached Zhangjiakou and tried to find a site for the Zhangjiakou Station. Before deciding the final location of the station, Zhan visited Governor-General of Chahar Pu Ting (溥颋) and other local officials.

=== Construction ===
Construction began on October 2, 1905, in three sections.

==== Section I: Fengtai–Nankou ====
This section was 55 km long, starting from Bridge 60 of Beijing-Fengtian Railway (京奉铁路) located in the east of Fengtai Station in Liucun (柳村). When building the section, the Beijing–Zhangjiakou Railway borrowed sites and facilities from the Imperial Railways of North China, and agreed, through negotiation, to pay the latte an annual rent of 200 taels of silver. On September 30, 1906, the section was fully built and put in use. Meanwhile, the Xizhimen Station (西直门站), designed by the Beijing–Zhangjiakou Railway Administration, was established also in 1905–1906.

==== Section II: Nankou-Chadaocheng (岔道城) ====
This section was 16.5 km long, covering the most challenging part in the Guan’gou Valley (关沟). To be closer to the construction site, Zhan Tianyou moved his office to Nankou. In order to satisfy the need for ballast and locomotives, a ballast factory was built in Nankou in 1906, (Note: It was the first ballast production base in Beijing.) and a locomotive factory, the Jingzhang Manufactory (京张制造厂), was established in the same year. (Note: The manufactory was the predecessor of Beijing Nankou Locomotive and Train Factory.) When building the railway going through the Jundu Mountain, Zhan Tianyou used a zigzag, (Note: It was also called zigzag tack in some literature.) at a high gradient of 0.033. Owed to the design, the length of the Badaling Tunnel was reduced from 1.8 km, which was beyond the construction capacity back then, to 1.095 km. Before the excavation in Badaling began, Japanese merchant Amemiya Keijirou (雨宫敬次郎) and Kinder recommended foreign machinery and contractors to Zhan Tianyou as a solution to the seemingly unconquerable task. Zhan, however, stood fast on using an all-Chinese team. When building the tunnel, in addition to cutting from the two sides of the mountain, Zhan also drilled two vertical shafts from the mountaintop, so that workers can excavate within the mountain on four surfaces simultaneously. Of the two shafts, the bigger one was 33 m deep and 3.05 m wide. Together, they contributed to a daily excavation of 0.9 m. Also, with fans installed, the shafts could bring air to the tunnel, and served, after the tunnel was finished, as ventilation shafts, through which the smoke puffed by the train could run out. To accelerate the construction, workers worked in shifts. Among the 60 people in each shift, 40 were responsible for blasting and 20 for transportation. When building the rail track going through the Juyong Pass, Zhan decided to build a tunnel in the nearby mountain to avoid damaging civilian houses. During the excavation, the construction team found a gorge that had probably been blocked by other people, which, together with the soft mountain rocks and soil, posed a great challenge to the construction. In 1907, the Qing government ordered the Beijing–Zhangjiakou Railway Administration to plant trees along the railway. On April 14, 1908, the 367 m Juyongguan Tunnel was completed, and on May 22, the 1,090.5 m Badaling Tunnel was completed. Before that, construction work of the 141 m and 46 m tunnels in Shifosi (石佛寺) and Wuguitou (五桂头) had been finished.

==== Section III: Chadaocheng-Huailai-Zhangjiakou ====
The section was 129.7 km long. The construction started even before the second section was completed, and work on this section was largely accelerated by the completion of the first two sections as construction materials could be transported by rail. The major challenges in this section lied in the Huailai River Bridge (怀来河大桥) and the section between Jiming Mountain (鸡鸣山) and Xiangshuipu (响水铺). For the former, Zhan Tianyou built a steel truss bridge with timber-pile foundation and concrete abutments; for the latter, the riverbed was raised with fillings, and cement was used to protect the track from flood damage. On July 4, the railway finally reached Zhangjiakou.

==== Opening ====
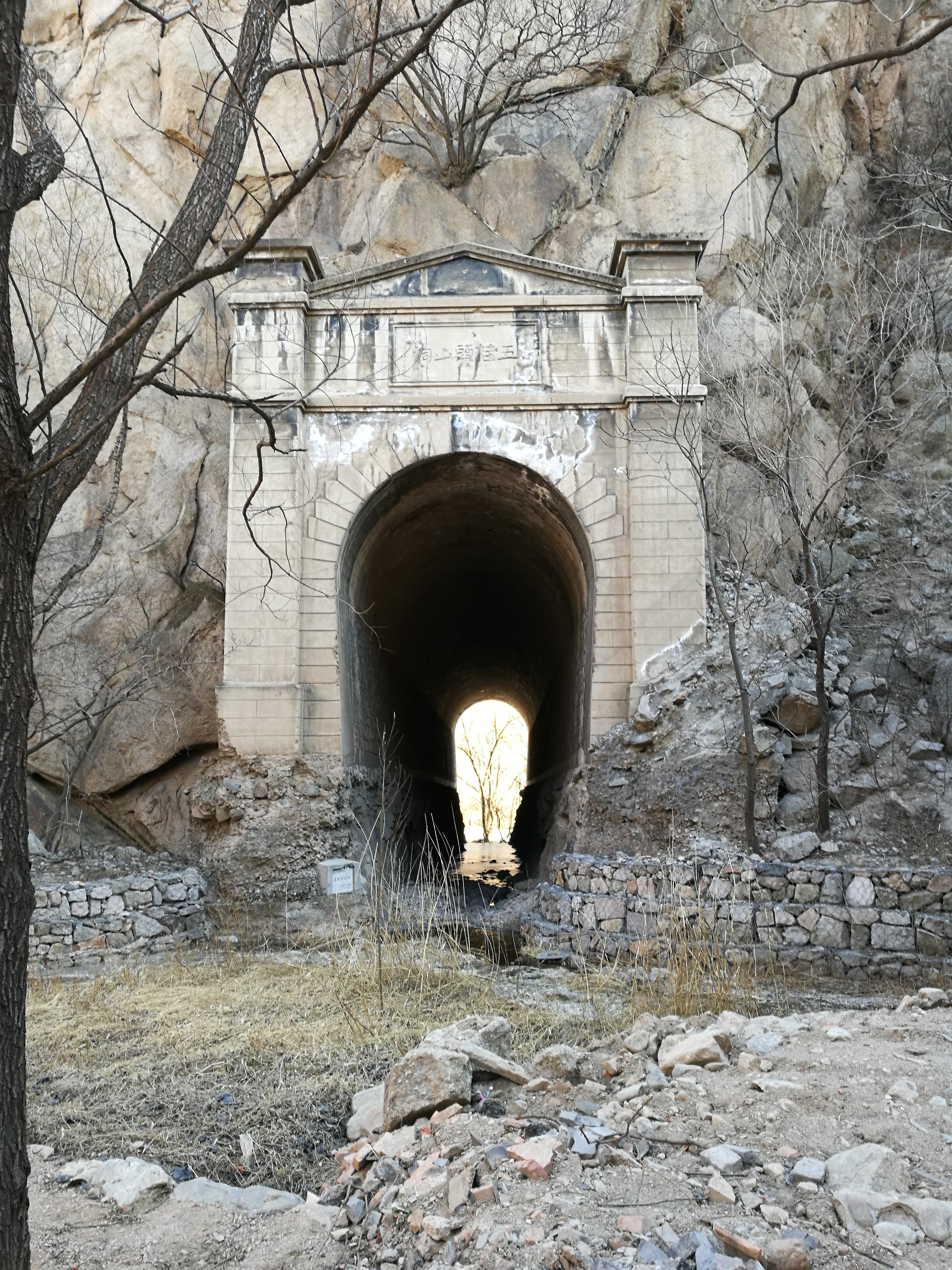
Wuguitou Tunnel; foundation damaged by flood.

On August 11, 1909, with some final work finished, the project was formally completed. On September 19, Minister of Posts and Communications Xu Shichang, Director-General of Beijing–Zhangjiakou Railway Zhan Tianyou, and Assistant Director-General of Beijing–Zhangjiakou Railway Guan Mianjun (关冕钧) took the train and checked the railway section by section. A celebration tea party was held in Zhangjiakou on September 21. On September 24, the Beijing–Zhangjiakou Railway was formally opened. An opening ceremony was held in the Nankou Station on October 2, with over 10,000 people present, including foreign diplomats in Beijing and Tianjin, representatives of the minister of Beiyang (北洋大臣), and senior officials of the Ministry of Post and Communications. Xu Shichang, Zhan Tianyou, and Zhu Junqi (朱君淇) made speeches on the ceremony. The actual total cost of the 201.2 km (125.0 mi) railway was 289,000 less than the initially expected 7.29 million taels of silver, and the cost per km (34,500 taels of silver) marked the lowest of all railways in China. More importantly, the Beijing–Zhangjiakou Railway was Qing Dynasty's first and only railway that had been designed, built, and managed solely by Chinese.

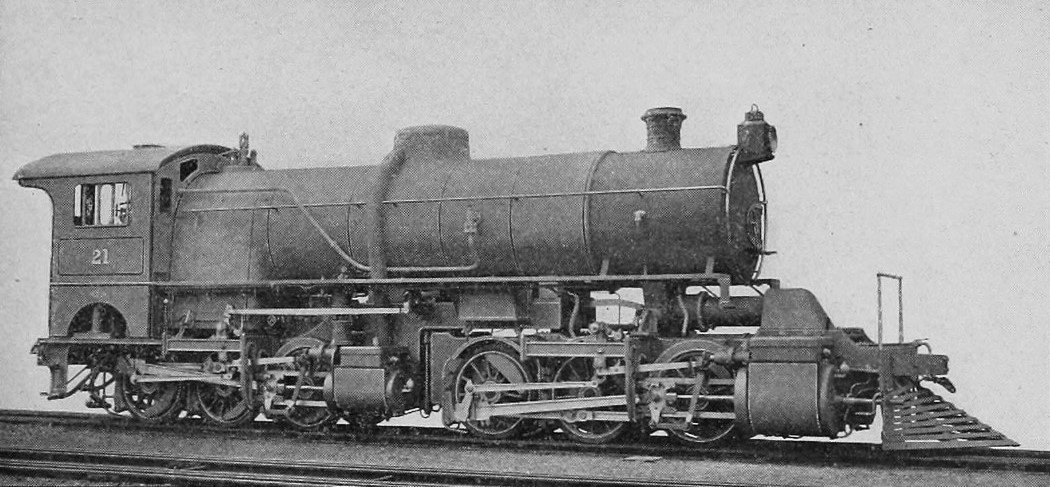
Mallet locomotive built by North British Locomotive Co. Ltd.

The North British Locomotive Company delivered three Mallet locomotives for the railway. They were the first ever built articulated compound locomotives in Great Britain and were designed to work on steep 1:30 grades and 500 ft radius curves of the route. Only the locomotives were built in Great Britain, the tenders were locally supplied.

After the opening, the railway was used for various purposes, including transporting mails between Fengtai and Zhangjiakou. The Qinghe railway station gradually took place of the Qinghe waterway in transporting passengers and cargo. The ballast production in Nankou ended, while the Jingzhang Manufactory expanded.

=== Later development ===
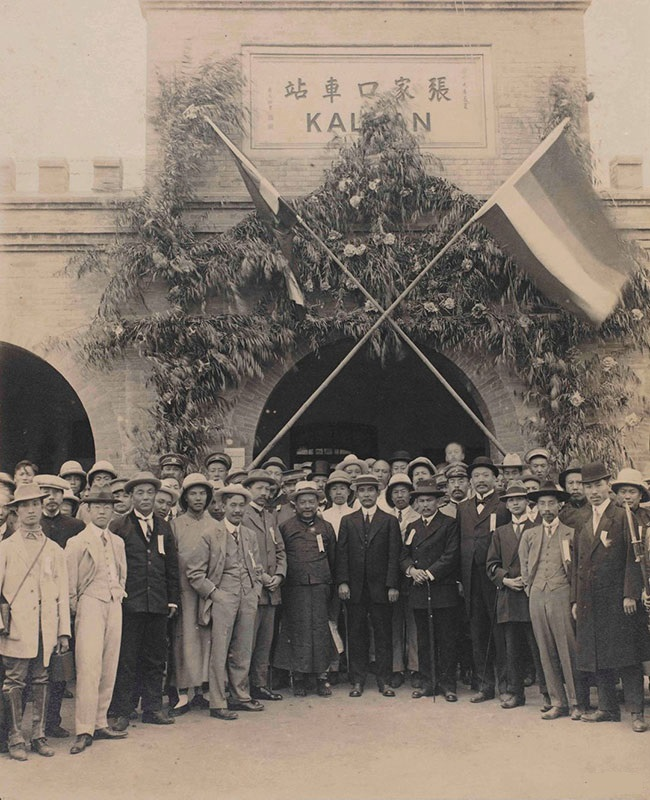
Sun Yat-sen on inspection tour; at Zhangjiakou Station

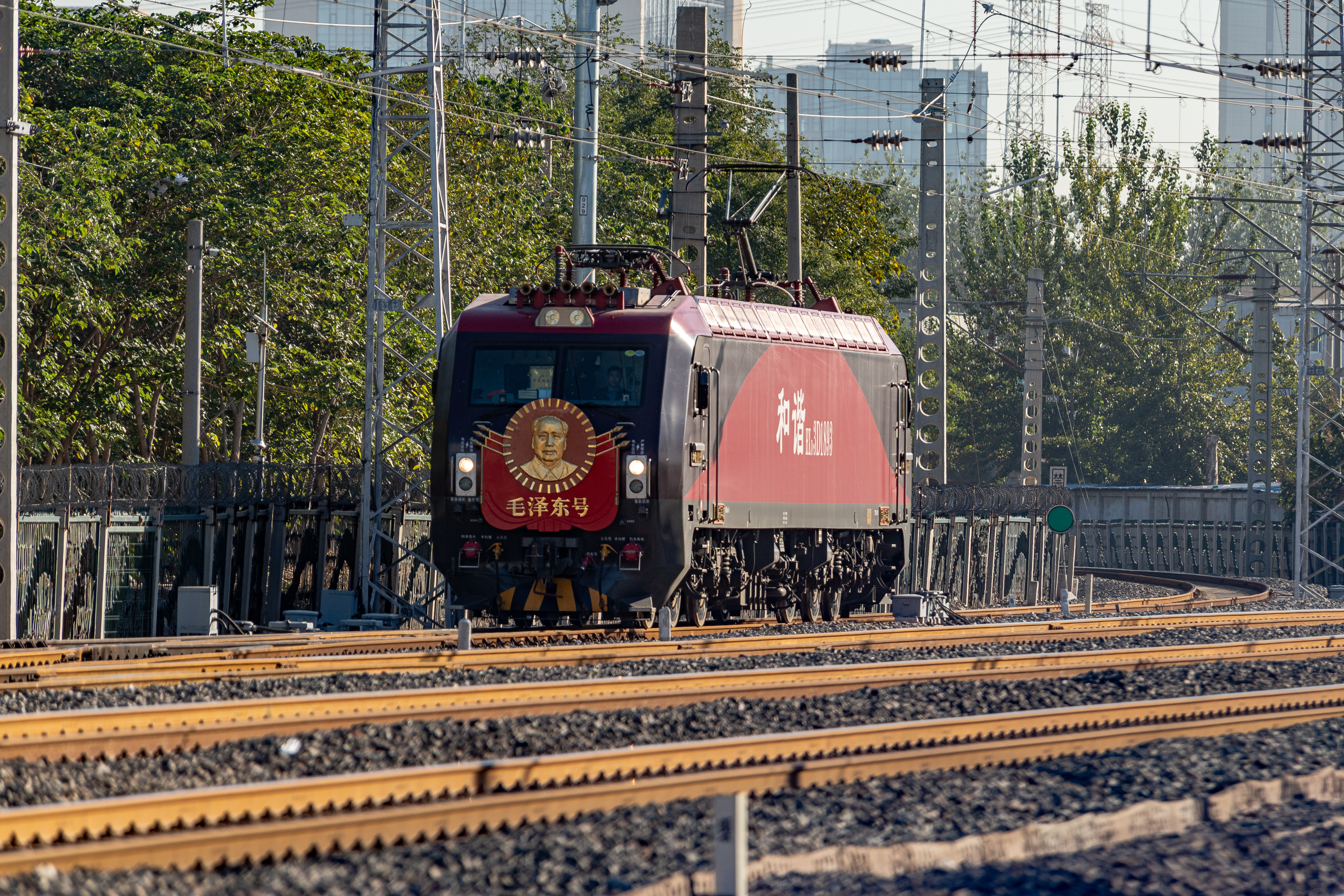
Liucun, the 0km point of Peking-Kalgan Railway, in October 2020

In 1910, the Beijing–Zhangjiakou Railway Engineering Bureau moved to Zhangjiakou under the new name of Zhangjiakou-Suiyuan Railway Engineering Bureau, to support the construction of Zhangjiakou-Suiyuan Railway (张绥铁路). In September 1912, Sun Yat-sen (孙中山), who resigned from the post of interim president of Republic of China, showed great interest in railway undertaking. He met Yuan Shikai in Beijing, and took an inspection tour to Zhangjiakou by train. In 1916, as the Beijing–Zhangjiakou Railway Authority merged into the Beijing-Suiyuan Railway Authority, the Beijing–Zhangjiakou Railway became a part of the Beijing-Suiyuan Railway. In April 1921, the railway extended westward to Suiyuan, and further to Baotou in January 1923. In 1928, the Beijing-Suiyuan Railway was renamed Peking-Suiyuan Railway (平绥铁路), and was renamed again after the establishment of PRC as Beijing-Baotou Railway. In 1924, six kilometres of the railway near the Xiahuayuan Station (下花园站) was relocated due to flood damage. After the outbreak of Japanese Aggression against China, the railway was seized by Japanese army. On July 25, 1939, ten kilometres of the railway in the Huailai section was relocated due to flood damage, and the Wuguitou Tunnel and Shifosi Tunnel were discarded also because of flood damage. In 1940, four newly built tunnels and five newly built bridges were put in use, and the ruling gradient rose from 0.333 to 0.358. In 1953, the railway between Kangzhuang (康庄) and Langshan (狼山) was relocated. In 1960, due to the expansion of Tsinghua University, the rail track in the north of Qinghuayuan Station was relocated to the east, and new buildings were established in the south of the original station, which turned into a freight yard. In 1968, due to the need of Beijing's urban traffic, the railway between Guang’anmen and Xizhimen was dismantled, while that between Liucun and Guang’anmen maintained operation. In 2016, for the construction of Beijing-Zhangjiakou inter-city railway, rail tracks within the Beijing city were all dismantled and the Qinghuayuan Station was closed permanently.

== Commemoration and conservation ==
In 1919, Zhan Tianyou died of disease in Hankou at age of 58. In commemoration of him, in 1922, the Chinese Engineers Society (中国工程师学会), together with the Association of Colleagues of Beijing-Suiyuan Railway (京绥铁路同人会) and other organisations, built a 3 m high bronze statue of him in the Qinglongqiao Station. In 1926, Zhan's wife Tan Juzhen died and was buried with him. In 1982, the Ministry of Railways of PRC, the Beijing Railway Administration, and the China Railway Society moved their tomb in Baiwanzhaung (百万庄) in west Beijing to a new burial ground behind the bronze statue in the Qinglongqiao Station. In 1995, the former Xizhimen Station was listed as Major Historical and Cultural Site of Beijing under the name of "Former Xizhimen Station of Peking-Suiyuan Railway". In 2007, an industrial historical site survey team, organised by the Capital Museum and Beijing Daily, discovered along the Beijing–Zhangjiakou Railway over 100 historical sites. In 2009, in the third national archaeological survey, the Zhangjiakou Station, Xinbaoan Station and other former stations were listed as industrial historical sites. In the same year, the Capital Museum and cultural heritage committees of districts and counties along the Beijing–Zhangjiakou Railway made a joint application for listing the whole railway as national cultural heritage. In 2013, the section from Nankou to Badaling was designated as Major Historical and Cultural Site Protected at the National Level, with historical sites including buildings of the Nankou Station, remains of Nankou locomotive manufactory, the switchback, station buildings, staff accommodation and supervision office of the Qinglongqiao Station, and Zhan Tianyou's tomb and bronze statue. In 2016, reservation plans were drafted for remains of the Beijing–Zhangjiakou Railway that have been listed as Major Historical and Cultural Site Protected at the National Level and included in the third national cultural heritage survey.
