= Qinglongqiao =

Qinglongqiao may refer to:

- Qinglongqiao Subdistrict, in Haidian District, Beijing
- Qinglongqiao railway station, in Yanqing District, Beijing
- Qinglongqiao West railway station, in Yanqing District, Beijing
