= Qinglongqiao West railway station =

Railway station in Yanqing, Beijing, China

Coordinates: 40°20′37.75″N 116°00′36.02″E

Qinglongqiao West 青龙桥西站
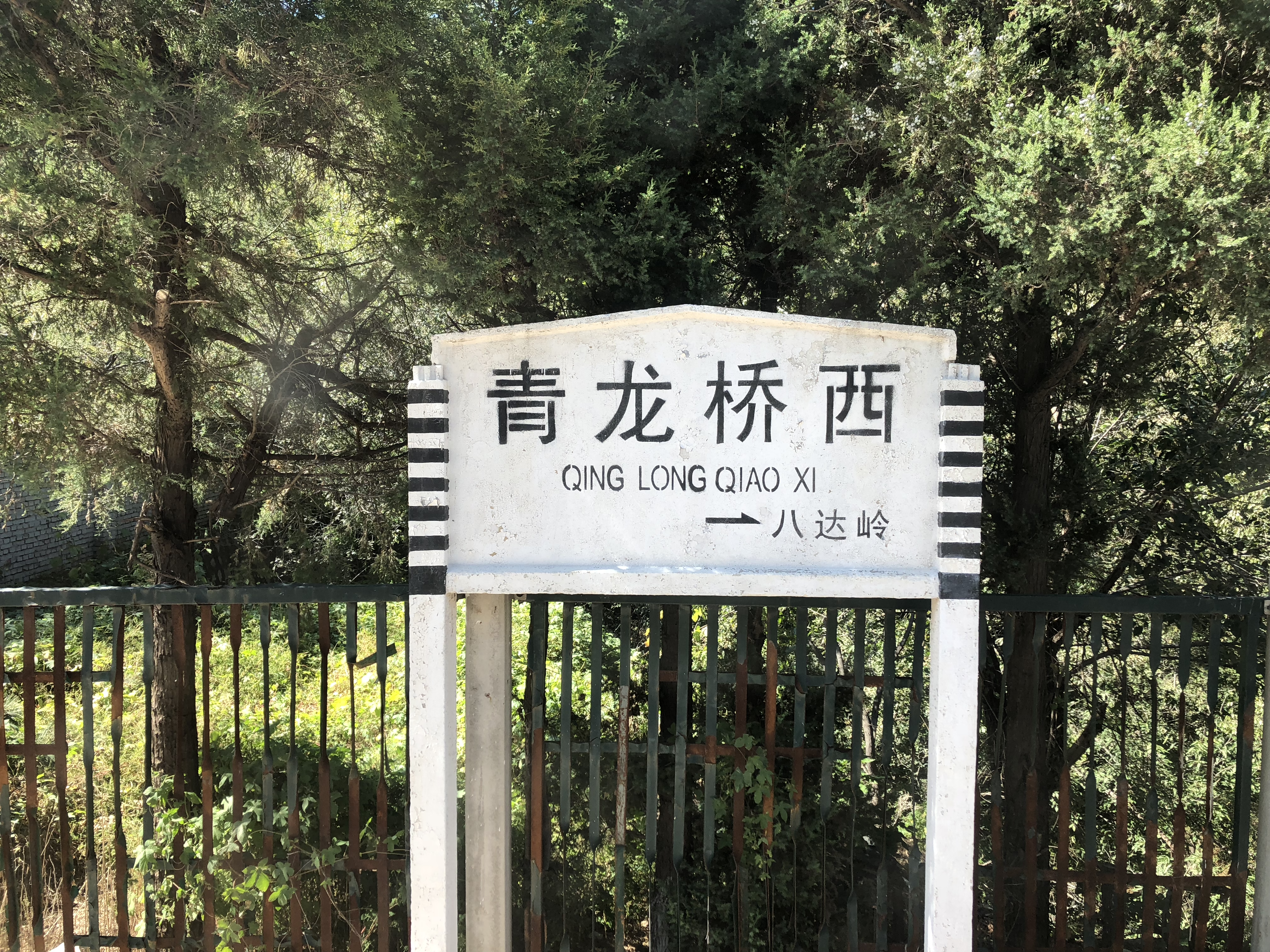

General information
- Location: Badaling Town, Yanqing District, Beijing; China
- Line: Beijing-Baotou railway
Location

Qinglongqiao West Railway Station (Chinese: 青龙桥西站; pinyin: Qīnglóngqiáo Xī Zhàn) is a station of Jingbao Railway in Badaling Town, Yanqing District, Beijing.

Note that there are two stations with "Qinglongqiao" in their names: Qinglongqiao and Qinglongqiao West. In the northbound direction, the Line S2 suburban trains from Huangtudian to Badaling & Yanqing use the western switchback, changing direction in Qinglongqiao West railway station. In the southbound direction do the trains use the eastern switchback, reversing at Qinglongqiao railway station.

== Schedule ==
No passenger trains currently stop at this station. Line S2 of the Beijing Suburban Railway stops at this station only to reverse through the switchback. It is not a passenger stop, and the doors on the train remain closed.

== See also ==
- Qinglongqiao railway station
- Badaling railway station
- Badaling Great Wall railway station
- List of stations on Jingbao railway
