= Zhangjiakou railway station (1909) =

Former railway station in Zhangjiakou, China

Coordinates: 40°48′49″N 114°53′19″E

Zhangjiakou railway station 张家口站
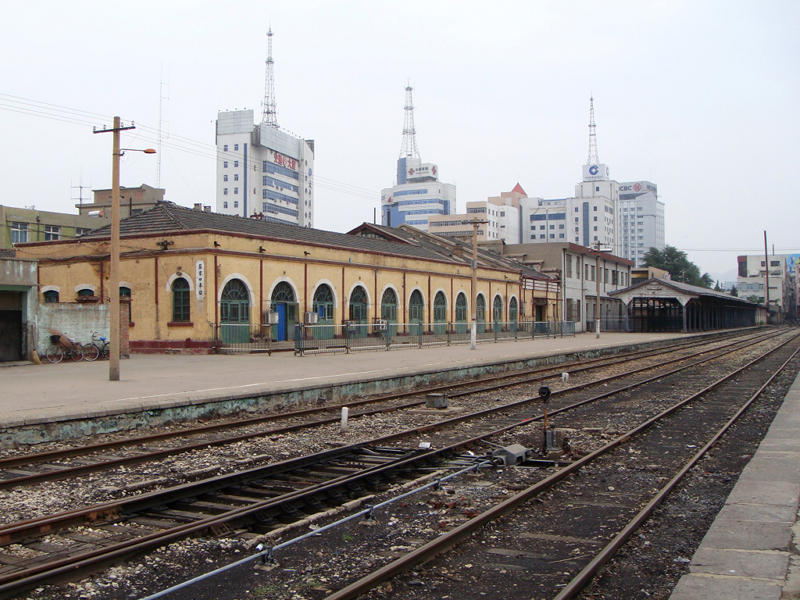

General information
- Location: Qiaodong District, Zhangjiakou, Hebei; China
- Operator: Beijing Railway Bureau, China Railway Corporation
- Lines: Jingbao Railway, Zhangji Railway, Jingzhang Intercity Railway

History
- Opened: 1909
- Closed: July 2014
- Former names: Kalgan
Location

Zhangjiakou railway station (Note: simplified Chinese: 张家口站; traditional Chinese: 張家口站; pinyin: Zhāngjiākǒu Zhàn) was a station on the Beijing–Baotou railway in Qiaodong District, Zhangjiakou, Hebei. The station was closed in July 2014.

== See also ==
List of stations on Jingbao railway
