= Zhan Tianyou =

Chinese railroad engineer (1861–1919)

Zhan Tianyou Tien-Yow Jeme
- 詹天佑
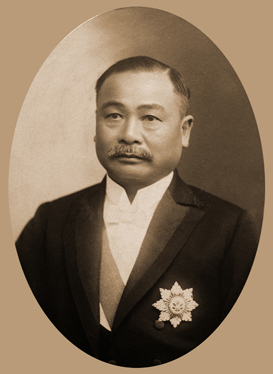
- Zhan in 1918
- Born: 26 April 1861; Namhoi, Canton, Qing China
- Died: 24 April 1919 (aged 57); Hankou, Republic of China
- Education: Yale University (PhB)
- Known for: Father of China's Railroad

Chinese name
- Chinese: 詹天佑
Transcriptions
Standard Mandarin
- Hanyu Pinyin: Zhān Tiānyòu
- Wade–Giles: Chan^{1} T'ien^{1}-you^{4}
Yue: Cantonese
- Yale Romanization: Jīm Tīn-yauh
- Jyutping: zim^{1} tin^{1} jau^{6}

Zhan Tianyou, or Tien-Yow Jeme (Chinese: 詹天佑; 26 April 1861 – 24 April 1919), was a pioneering Chinese railroad engineer who is known as the "Father of China's Railroad". Educated in the United States, he was the chief engineer responsible for construction of the Peking-Kalgan Railway (Beijing to Zhangjiakou), the first railway constructed in China without foreign assistance.

== Background ==
Jeme was born in Namhoi (now spelt Nanhai) county (now part of Guangzhou) in Guangdong. His family, which had long participated in business and commerce, came from Wuyuan County in Huizhou, Anhui (now in Jiangxi). In 1872, as a twelve-year-old, he was chosen by Qing (Ch'ing) imperial officials to be sent to the United States as part of the Chinese Educational Mission. Together with thirty boys of similar age, he arrived in Connecticut, United States. After studying at a primary school in New Haven, he entered the Hillhouse High School there, and in 1878, was admitted to the Sheffield Scientific School of Yale University. His major was Civil Engineering, with an emphasis in railroad construction, and received a Bachelor of Philosophy degree in 1881. He was considered lucky, because only a few months after his graduation, the Qing government decided to recall all students studying in the United States. Of those who were sent abroad, only he and another student (Owyang King, 欧阳庚) were able to complete their college degrees.

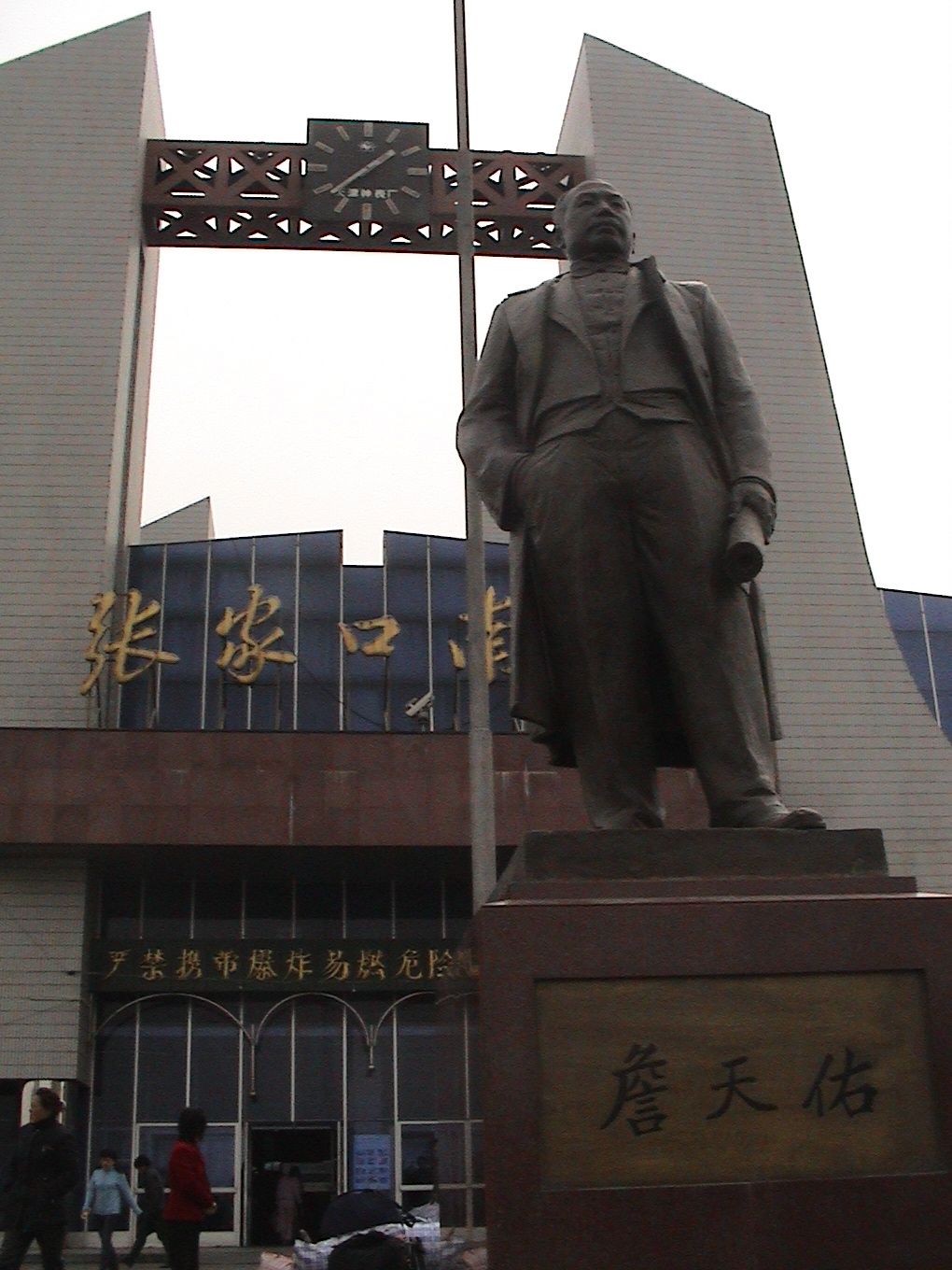
A statue of Jeme Tien-Yow, in Zhangjiakou south railway station

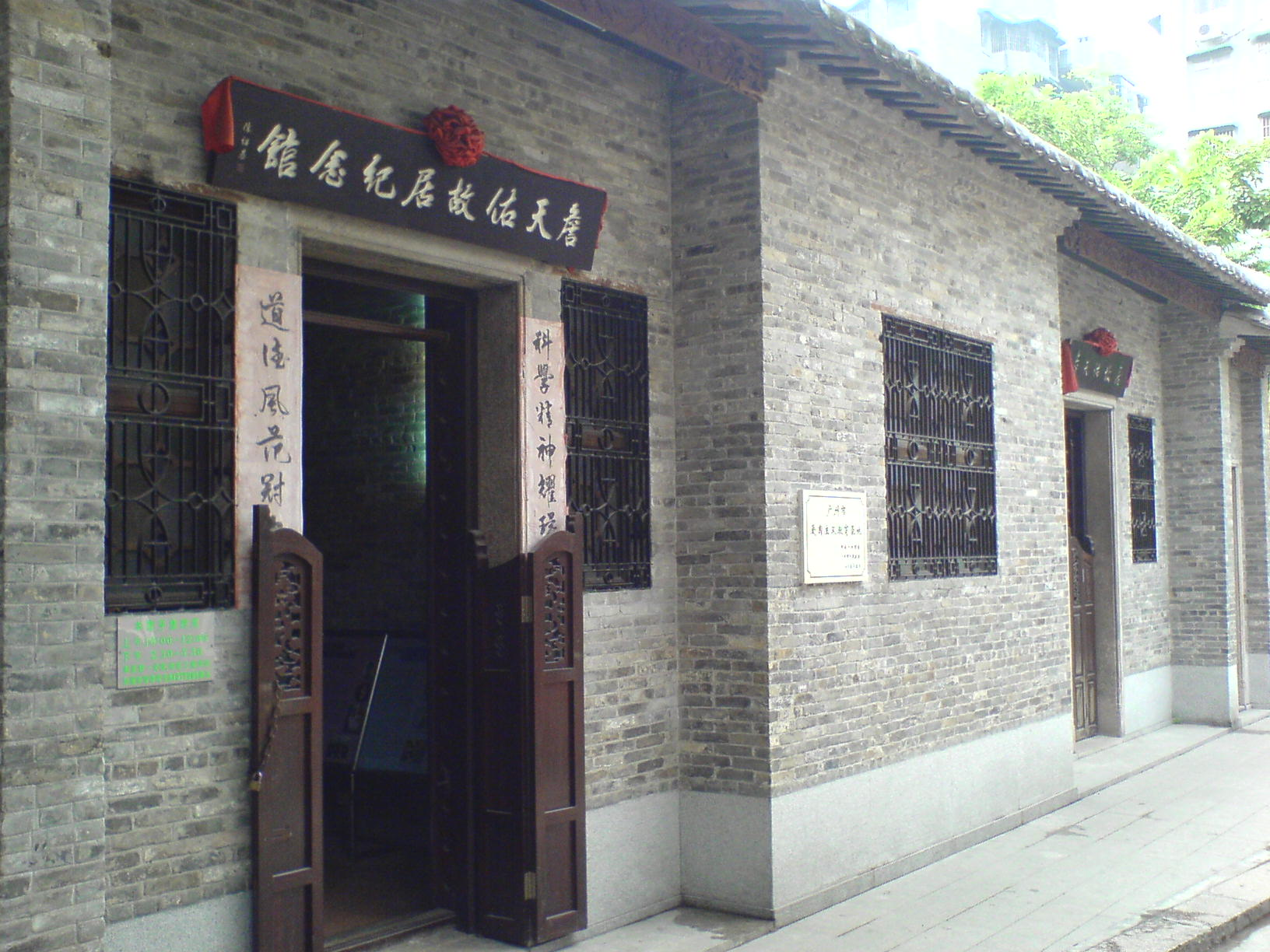
Jeme's former residence in Guangzhou

== Career ==
The Qing government officials found the behavior of the foreign-educated students to be "un-Chinese". They had adopted many Western practices such as playing baseball and wearing shirts and pants instead of traditional robes and had their queues cut off. Instead of utilizing their talents to the fullest, the government sent them all, including Jeme, to work as translators or as officers in the newly formed Imperial Navy. Jeme was sent to the Foochow Arsenal. A few years later, in 1884, the Imperial Navy at Fuchow was destroyed during the Sino-French War.

In 1888, Jeme was finally able to realize his dream of becoming an engineer. Viceroy Li Hongzhang in Peking was constructing a railroad that would link Tientsin to the coal mines in Tangshan. A British engineer, Claude W. Kinder, was hired as the chief engineer of the railroad. Through connections with his old schoolmates working in Peking, Jeme joined Kinder as an intern engineer. He was soon promoted to engineer, and later the district engineer. The railway that he worked on was later extended to become the Peking Mukden Line. He spent 12 years on various sections of this line before his next major assignment.

In 1902, Yuan Shikai decided to build a special line for Empress Dowager Cixi so she could visit the tombs of her royal ancestors. Kinder was the original candidate for chief engineer, however the French were unhappy that an Englishman was assigned to the position. Eventually, Jeme got the assignment as the chief engineer of the 37 kilometres (23 mi) stub line. He managed to construct the railroad within budget and to a very tight schedule. The Empress was pleased and permission was given to construct more railroads in China.

In 1905, the Imperial Qing government decided to build a railroad that would link the capital of Peking to the important trade city of Kalgan to the north. This railway would be of strategic importance to the government. The decision was therefore made that the railway would be built without foreign assistance. Capital would come from the government, and no foreign engineers were to be hired. Jeme was once again appointed as chief engineer of the railway. In the beginning, some people were skeptical that the government would be able to construct the railroad all by itself in the rugged mountains north of Peking. However, Jeme showed he was an able engineer and completed the work two years ahead of schedule and under budget. He included a zig zag section near the Qinglongqiao (Ching-lung-chiao) railway station to overcome the steep gradient. When excavating the Badaling railway tunnel, he accelerated construction by drilling a vertical shaft into the path of the tunnel. This doubled the number of digging teams that could be employed. He was also said to be a technical advisor for the construction of the Lo Wu Bridge built in 1906 as part of the Kowloon-Canton Railway.

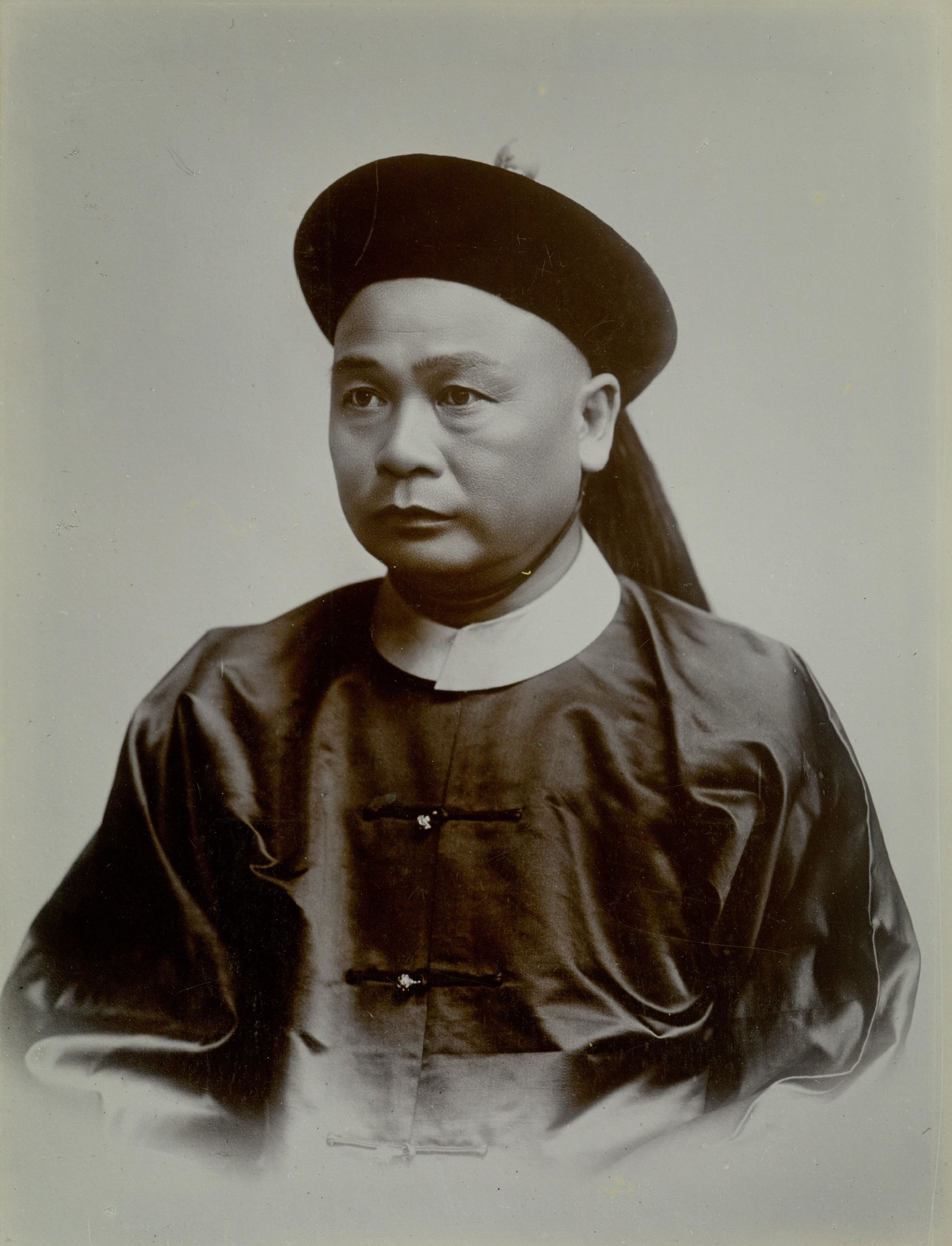
Zhan in 1909

== Recognition ==
Jeme was subsequently elected a member of the North British Academy of Arts in 1909. He was a founding member of the Chinese Institute of Engineers, and was awarded an honorary doctorate by the University of Hong Kong in 1916. He was elected to the American Society of Civil Engineers in 1909. A notice following his death written by his American peers called him the "Father of Chinese Railroads."

== Later life ==
In 1919, Jeme died in Hankow, Hupeh (now spelt Hankou, Hubei) at the age of 57, and was buried at the Qinglongqiao railway station, where the Peking-Kalgan (Beijing-Zhangjiakou) railway crossed the Great Wall and the rugged mountains north of Beijing. The Zhan Tianyou Museum was also established nearby, at Badaling, to commemorate his achievements.

Jeme's descendants range from Eastern China to the Philippines to the United States.

== References and further reading ==
- "Chan T'ien-yu," Boorman, Howard L., et al., eds (1967). Biographical Dictionary of Republican China Volume I. New York: Columbia University Press. ISBN 0231089589., pp. 12–15.
- "Memoir of Jeme Tien Yow," in Engineers, American Society of Civil (1919). Proceedings of the American Society of Civil Engineers. The Society., 681- 694.
- "Zhan Tianyou," Gao, James Z. (2009). Historical Dictionary of Modern China (1800-1949). Scarecrow Press. ISBN 978-0-8108-6308-8.
- Rhoads, Edward J.M. (2011), Stepping Forth into the World the Chinese Educational Mission to the United States, 1872-81, Hong Kong: Hong Kong University Press, distributed in North America by University of Washington Press, ISBN 9789888028863
- Detailed Profile of Jeme Tien Yau at https://cemconnections.com/students/jemetienyau/
