= Shaft (civil engineering) =

Underground vertical or inclined passageway in civil engineering

In civil engineering a shaft is a passageway that is either vertical or inclined more than 45 degrees. Shafts are often entered through a manhole and closed by a manhole cover. They are constructed for a number of reasons including:

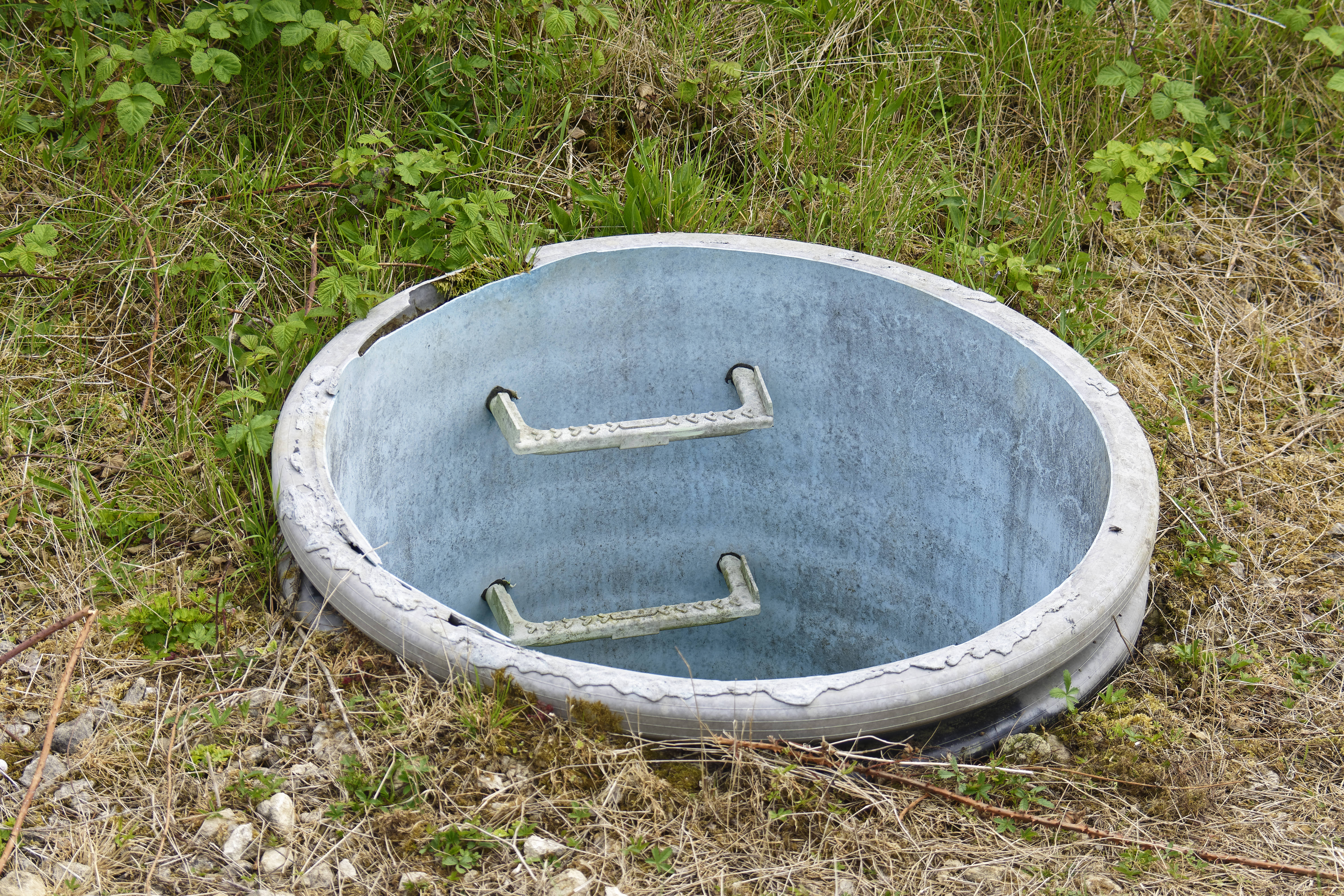
A shaft equipped with ladder rungs for personnel access

- For the construction of a tunnel
- For ventilation of a tunnel or underground structure, aka ventilation shaft
- As a drop shaft for a sewerage or water tunnel
- For access to a tunnel or underground structure, also as an escape route

== Construction ==
There are a number of methods for the construction of shafts, the most significant being:

- The use of sheet piles, diaphragm walls or bored piles to construct a square or rectangular braced shaft
- The use of segmental lining installed by underpinning or caisson sunk to form a circular shaft
- Incremental excavation with a shotcrete circular or elliptical lining
- Incremental excavation supported by shotcrete, rock bolts, cable anchors and steel sets or ribs

Shafts can be sunk either dry or for methods such as the caisson method they can be sunk wet. Sinking a dry shaft means that any water that flows into the excavation is pumped out to leave no significant standing or flowing water in the base of the shaft. When wet sinking a shaft the shaft is allowed to flood and the muck is excavated out of the base of the shaft underwater using a grab on the end of a crane or similar excavation method. Because the shaft is flooded, the lining can not be constructed at the excavation level of the shaft so this method only suits methods where the lining is installed before shaft sinking (such as the use of sheet piles) or where the lining is sunk down with the shaft such as the caisson method.
