= Badaling Town =

Badaling Town 八达岭镇
- Town
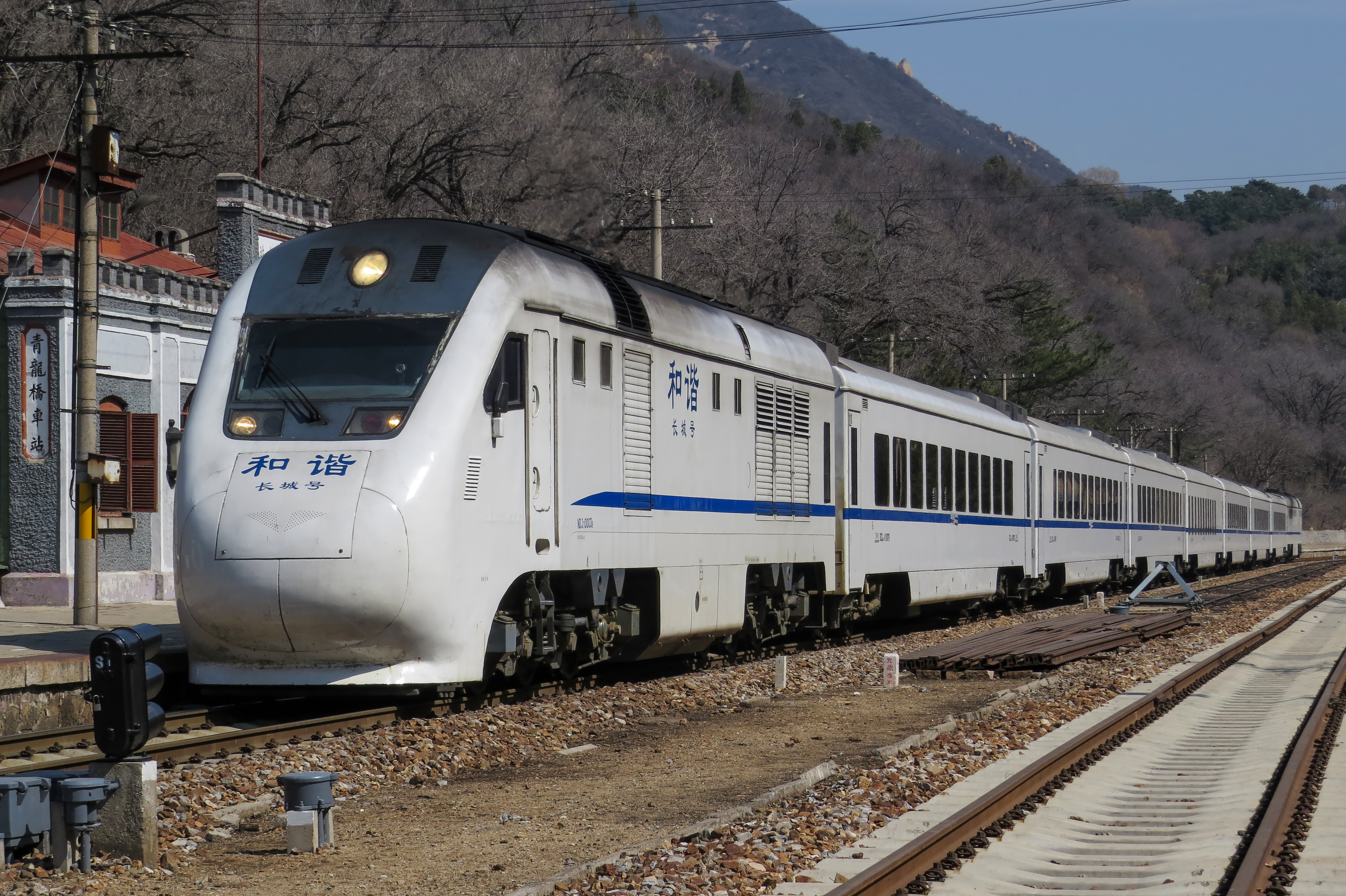
- Qinglongqiao railway station, 2017

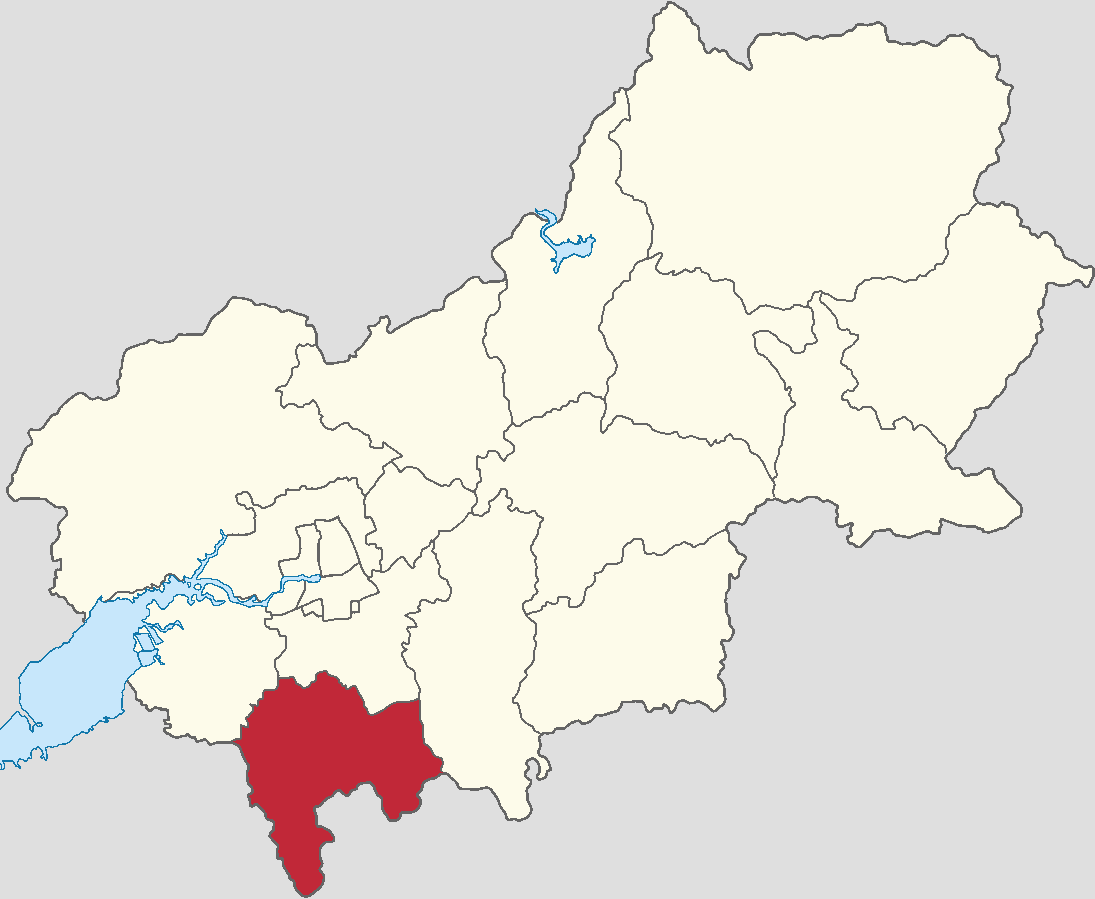
- Location in Yanqing District

- Location within Beijing Location within China
- Coordinates: 40°21′40″N 115°58′19″E
- Country: China
- Municipality: Beijing
- District: Yanqing
- Village-level Divisions: 1 community 15 villages

Area
  - Total: 99.38 km^{2} (38.37 sq mi)
- Elevation: 652 m (2,139 ft)

Population (2020)
  - Total: 10,024
  - Density: 100.9/km^{2} (261.2/sq mi)
- Time zone: UTC+8 (China Standard)
- Postal code: 102102
- Area code: 010

Badaling Town (simplified Chinese: 八达岭镇; traditional Chinese: 八達嶺鎮; pinyin: Bādálǐng Zhèn) is a town on the southwestern part of Yanqing District of Beijing. It borders Kangzhuang and Dayushu Towns to its north, Jingzhuang Town to its east, Nankou Town to its southeast, and Donghuayuan Town to its west. It was home to 10,024 people as of 2020.

The name originates from Badaling, a famous section of the Great Wall of China that is located on the south of the town.

== Geography ==
Badaling Town is at the foothill of Badaling site, with around 70% of the town being mountainous terrain. Beijing–Baotou railway, Badaling Expressway, National Highway 110 and Beijing–Lhasa Expressway all pass through parts of the town.

== History ==
Timeline of Badaling's History
Time	Status	Within
Ming and Qing dynasty	Chadao Village	Yanqing Department
1912 - 1928	Chadao Village	Yanqing County, Chahar
1928 - 1952	Lipao Township Waipao Township	Yanqing County, Chahar
1952 - 1956	Lipao Township Waipao Township Badaling Township	Yanqing County, Hebei
1956 - 1958	Badaling People's Commune	Yanqing County, Hebei
1958 - 1959	Badaling People's Commune	Yanqing County, Beijing
1959 - 1961	Xibazi Production Team, part of Yanqing People's Commune	Yanqing County, Beijing
1961 - 1964	Xibazi People's Commune	Yanqing County, Beijing
1964 - 1972	Kangzhuang People's Commune	Yanqing County, Beijing
1972 - 1983	Xibazi People's Commune	Yanqing County, Beijing
1983 - 1993	Xibazi Township	Yanqing County, Beijing
1993 - 2015	Badaling Town	Yanqing County, Beijing
2015–present	Badaling Town	Yanqing District, Beijing

== Administrative divisions ==
In 2021, Badaling Town had direct jurisdiction over 16 subdivisions, more specifically 1 communities and 15 villages. They are listed in the table below:

Subdivision names	Name transliterations	Type
八达岭镇	Badalingzhen	Community
石峡	Shixia	Village
帮水峪	Bangshuiyu	Village
里炮	Lipao	Village
外炮	Waipao	Village
营城子	Yingchengzi	Village
东曹营	Dongcaoying	Village
大浮坨	Da Futuo	Village
小浮坨	Xiao Futuo	Village
程家窑	Chengjiayao	Village
岔道	Chadao	Village
西拨子	Xibozi	Village
南园	Nanyuan	Village
东沟	Donggou	Village
石佛寺	Shifosi	Village
三堡	Sanpu	Village

== Landmark ==
- Badaling

== Gallery ==
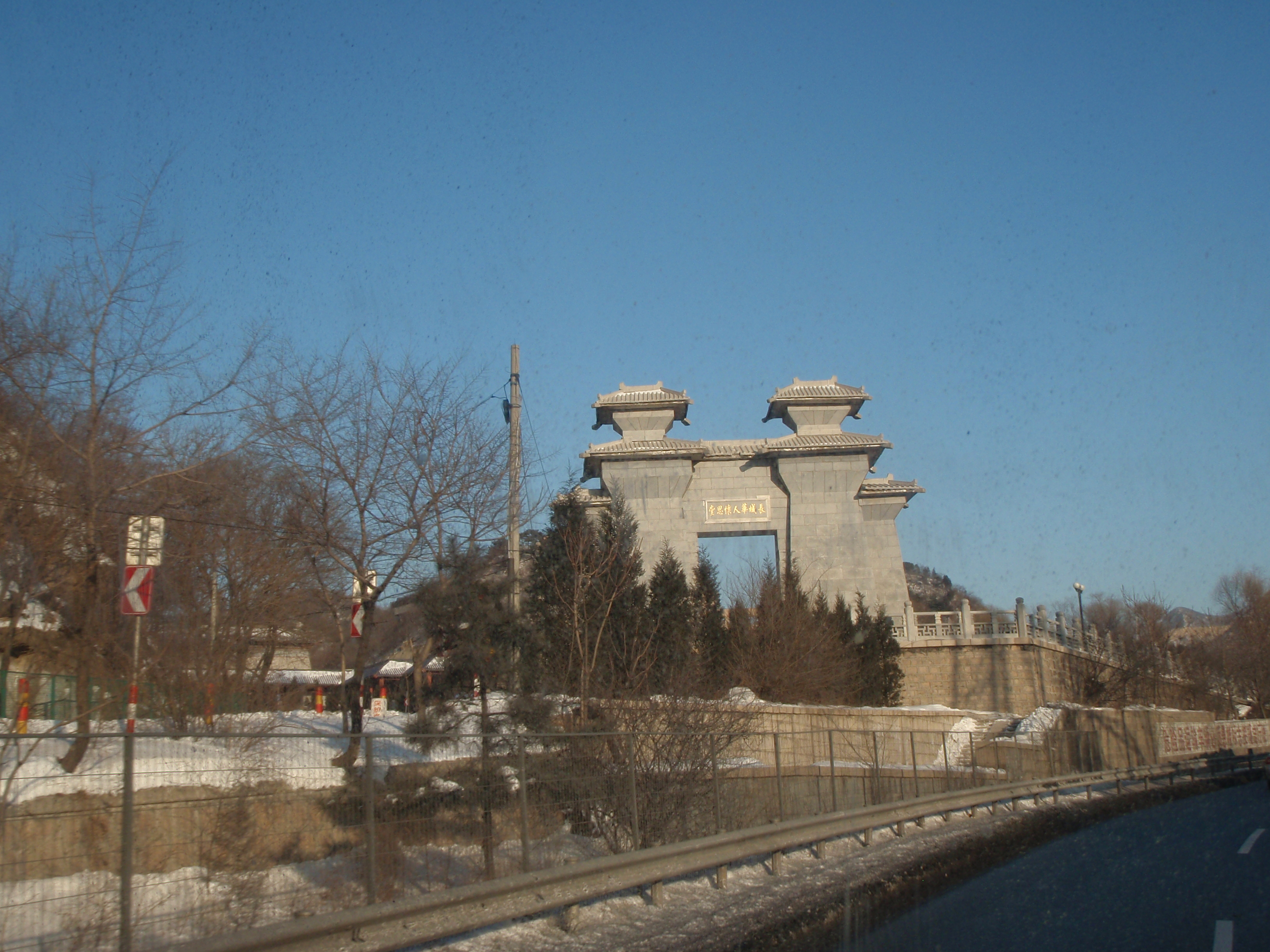
Badaling Juyong Pass Chinese Memorial, 2010

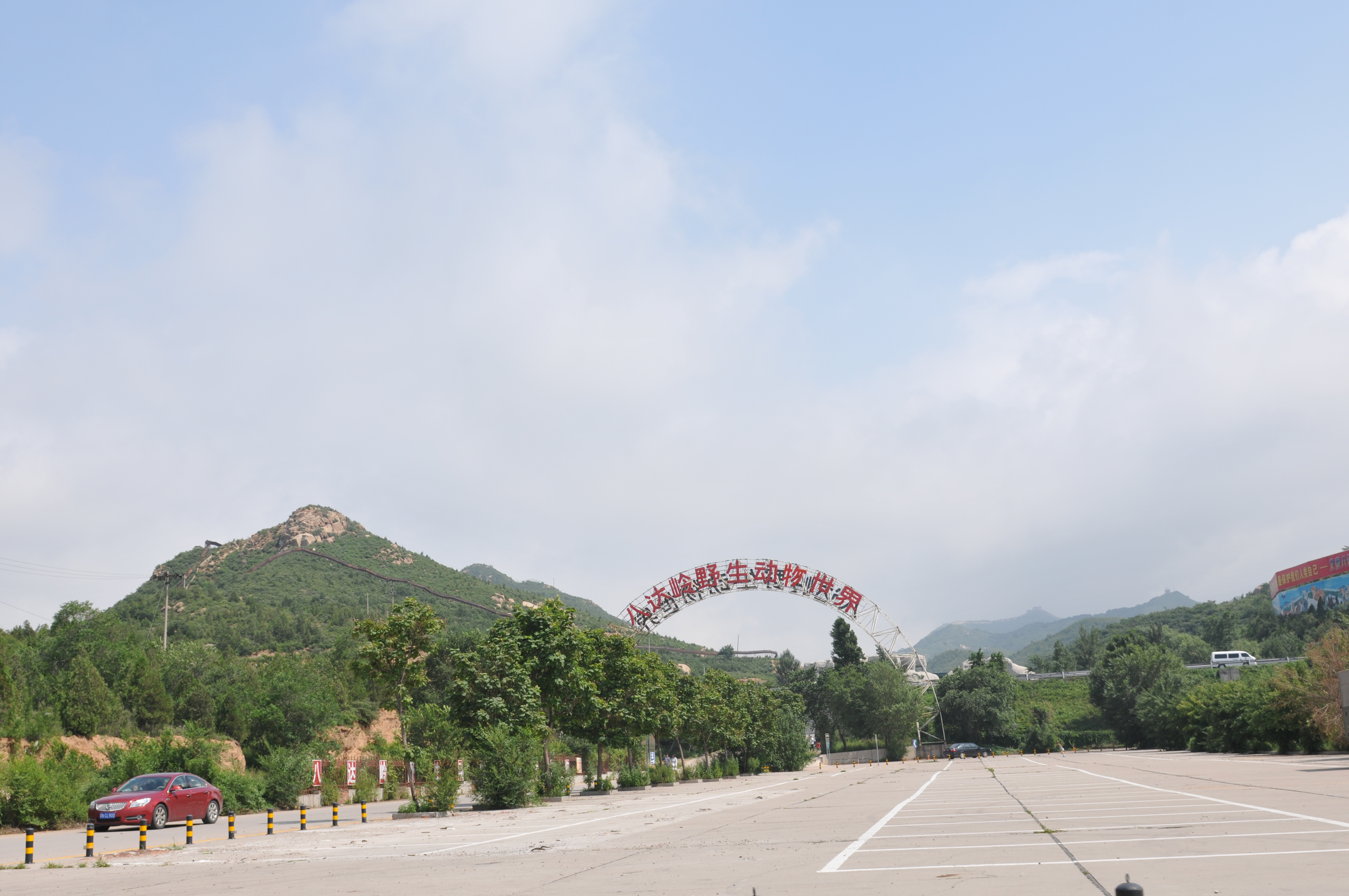
Entrance of Badaling Wildlife Zoo, 2011

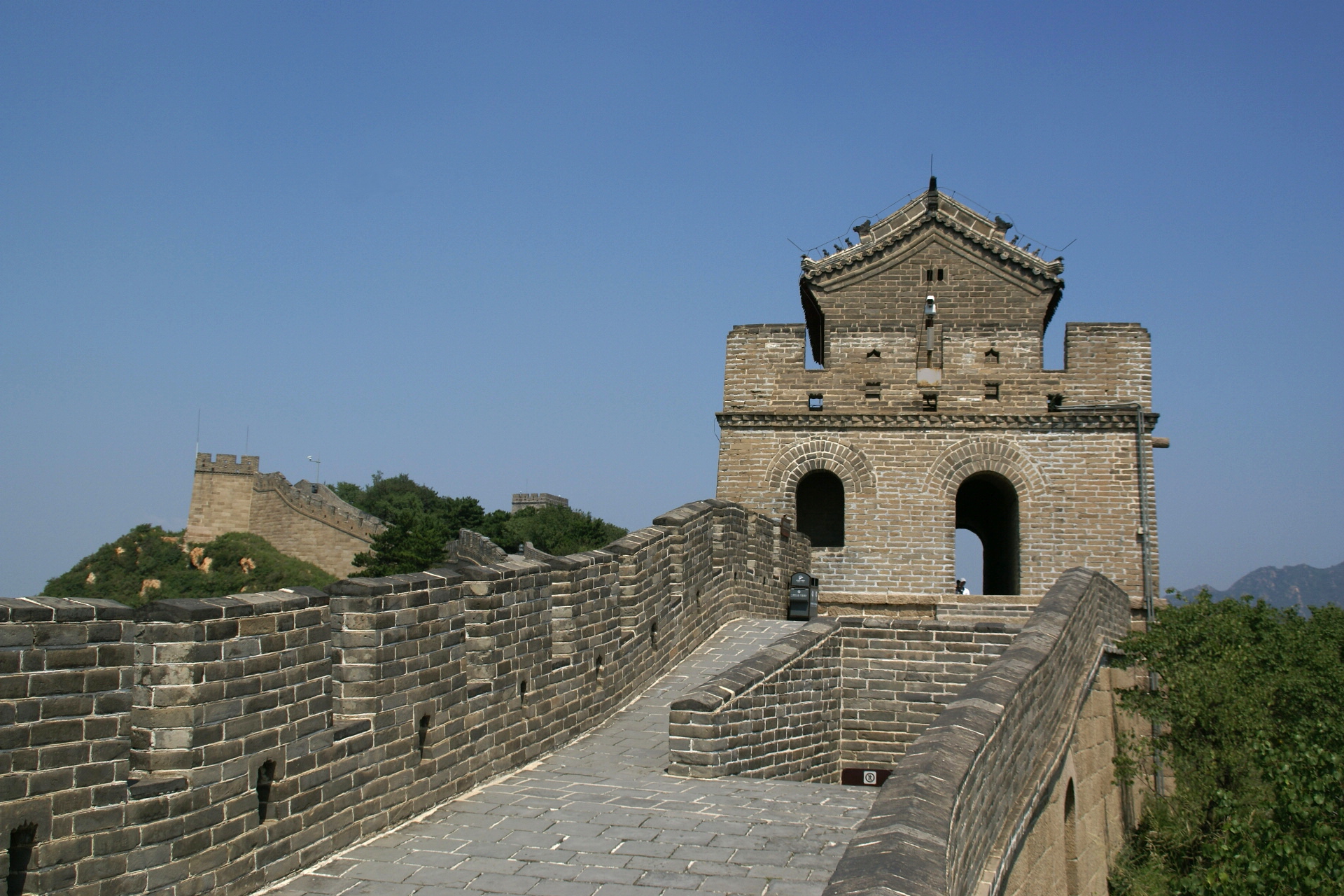
Badaling section of the Great Wall, 2014

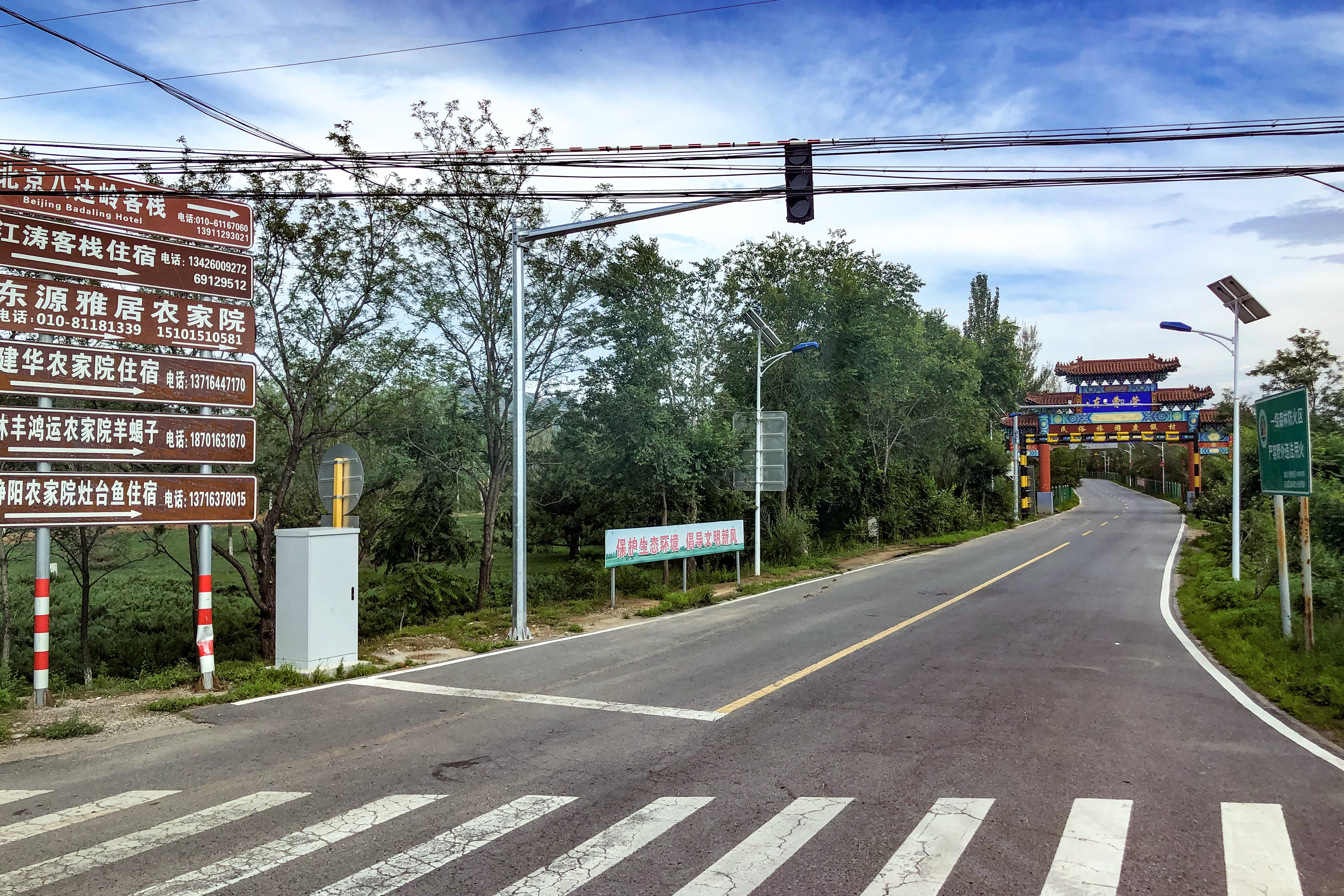
Dongcaoying Village, 2020

== See also ==
- List of township-level divisions of Beijing
