= Qinglongqiao railway station =

Railway station in Yanqing, Beijing, China

Coordinates: 40.3503°N 116.019°E

Qinglongqiao 青龙桥
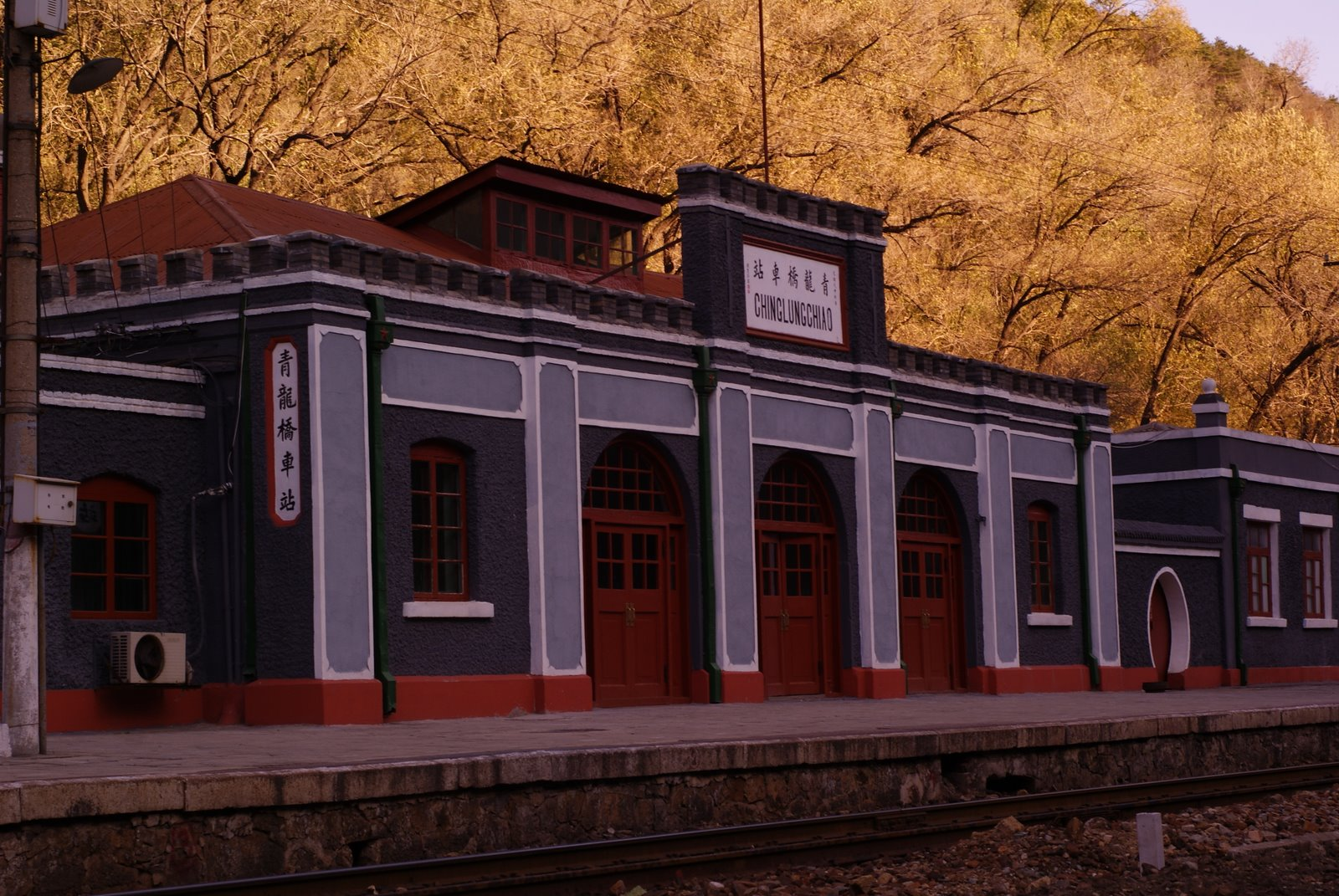

General information
- Location: Badaling Town, Yanqing District, Beijing; China
- Line: Beijing-Baotou railway

Qinglongqiao railway station (Chinese: 青龙桥站; pinyin: Qīnglóngqiáo Zhàn) (also known as Ching-lung-chiao railway station) is a historic station of Jingbao Railway located in Badaling Town, Yanqing District, Beijing. It was built in 1908, and includes the famous zigzag railway designed by the Chinese railroad engineer Zhan Tianyou (Jeme Tien-Yow). The station also contains the tomb of Zhan Tianyou and a statue of his, along with milestones in Suzhou numerals.

Note that there are two stations with "Qinglongqiao" in their names: Qinglongqiao and Qinglongqiao West. In the northbound direction, the Line S2 suburban trains from Huangtudian to Badaling & Yanqing use the western switchback, changing direction in Qinglongqiao West railway station. Only in the southbound direction do the trains use the eastern switchback, reversing at Qinglongqiao railway station.

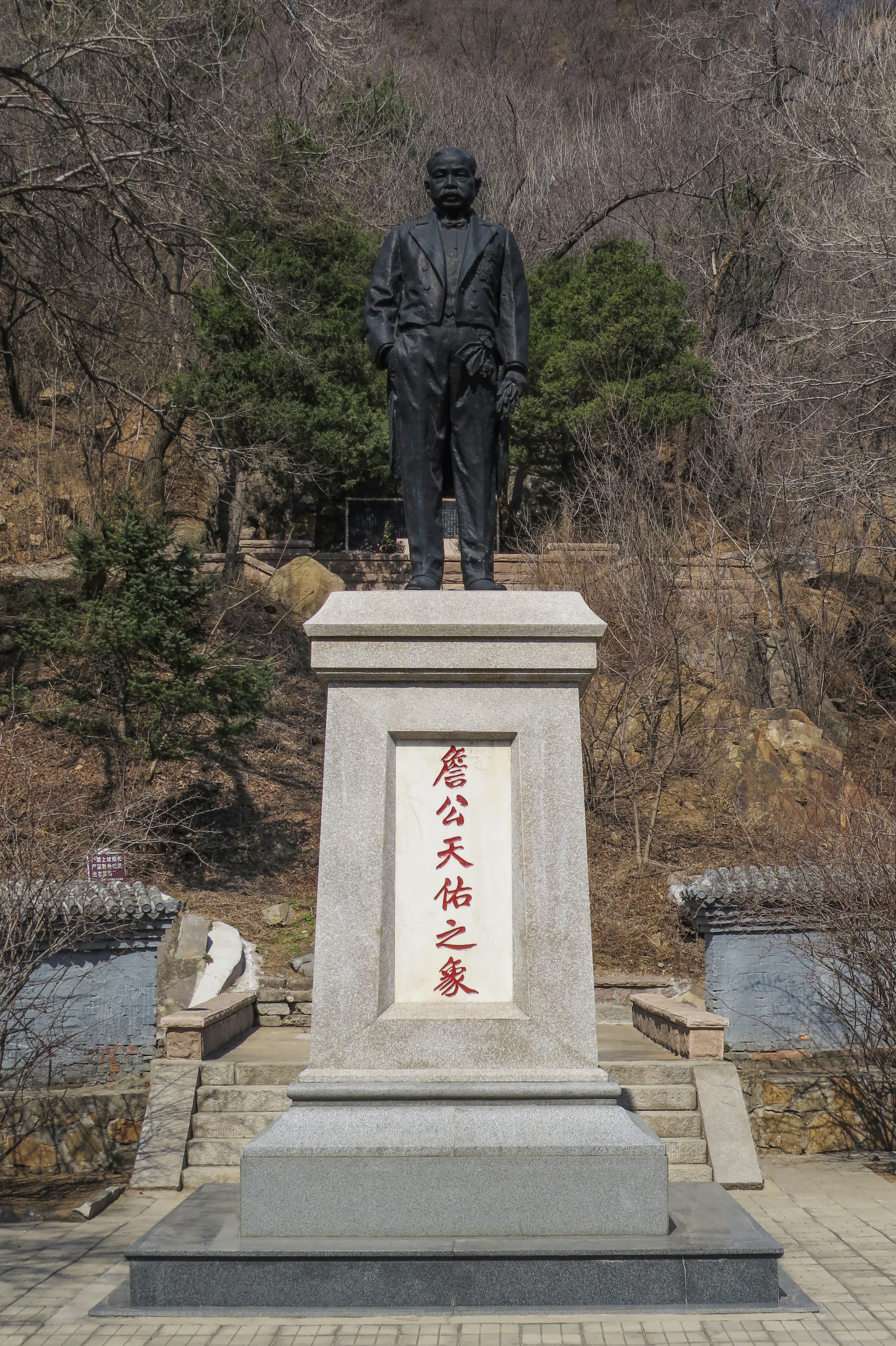
Statue of Zhan Tianyou at Qinglongqiao Station

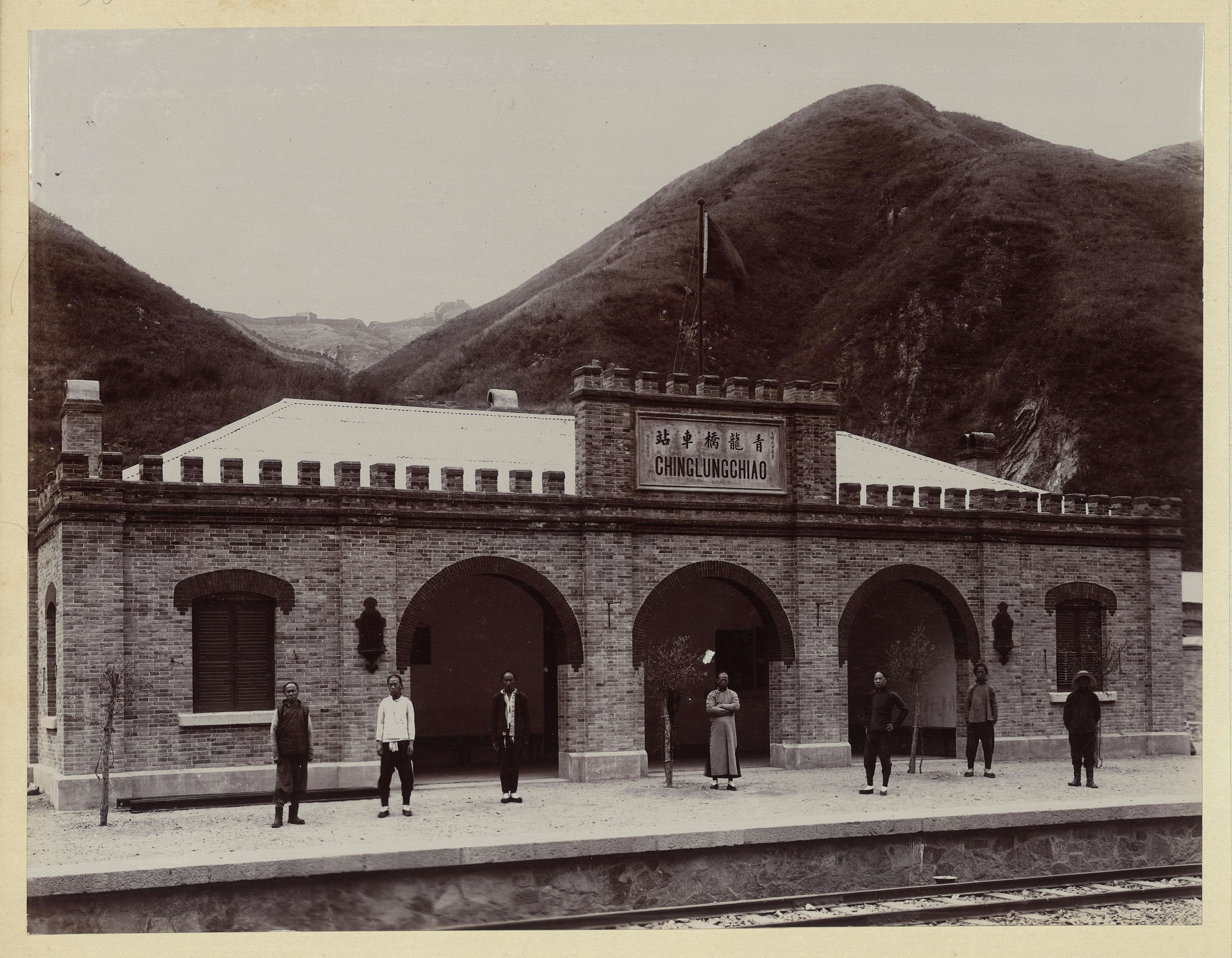
Qinglongqiao Railway Station in 1909

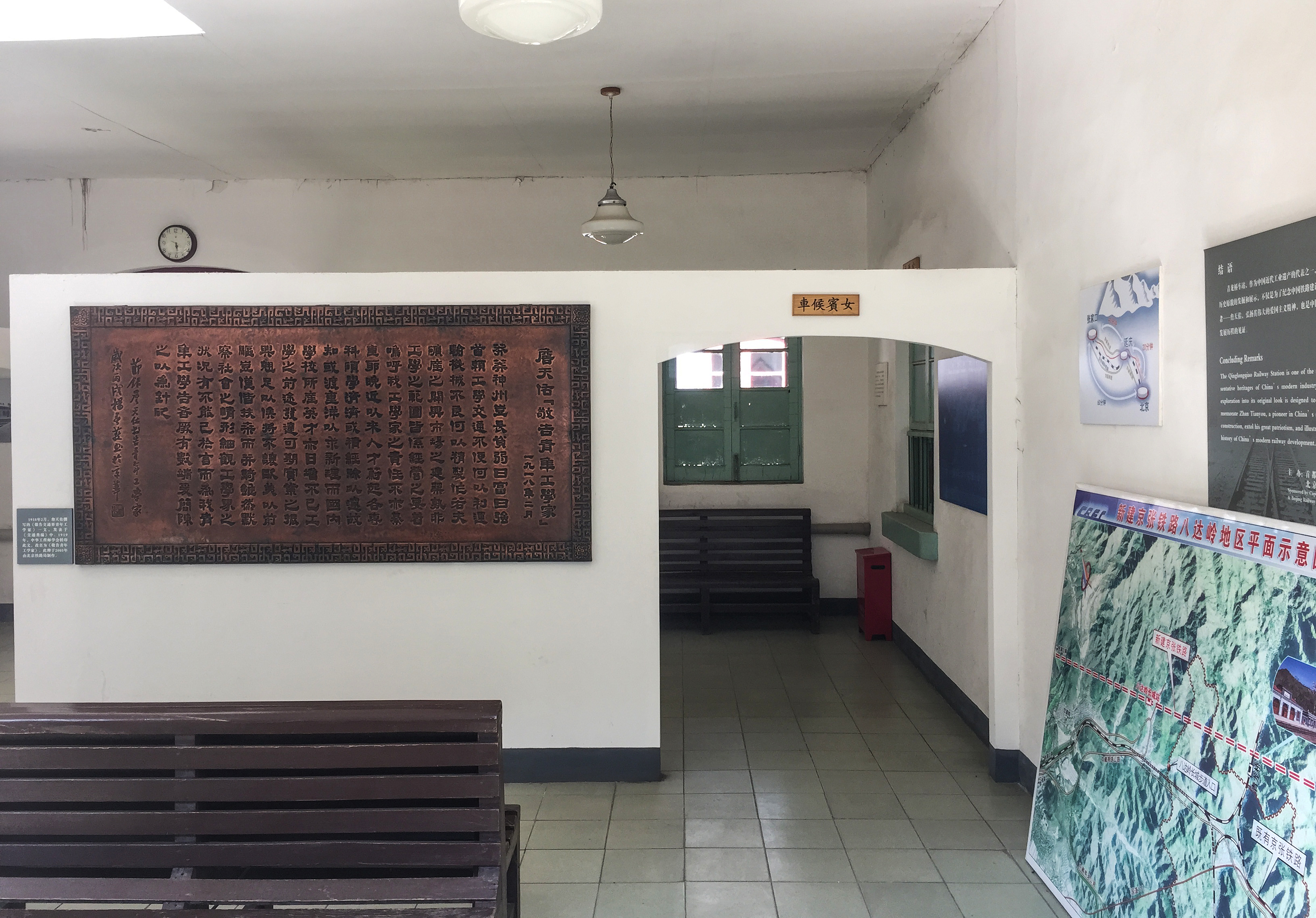
Interior of Qinglongqiao Railway Station

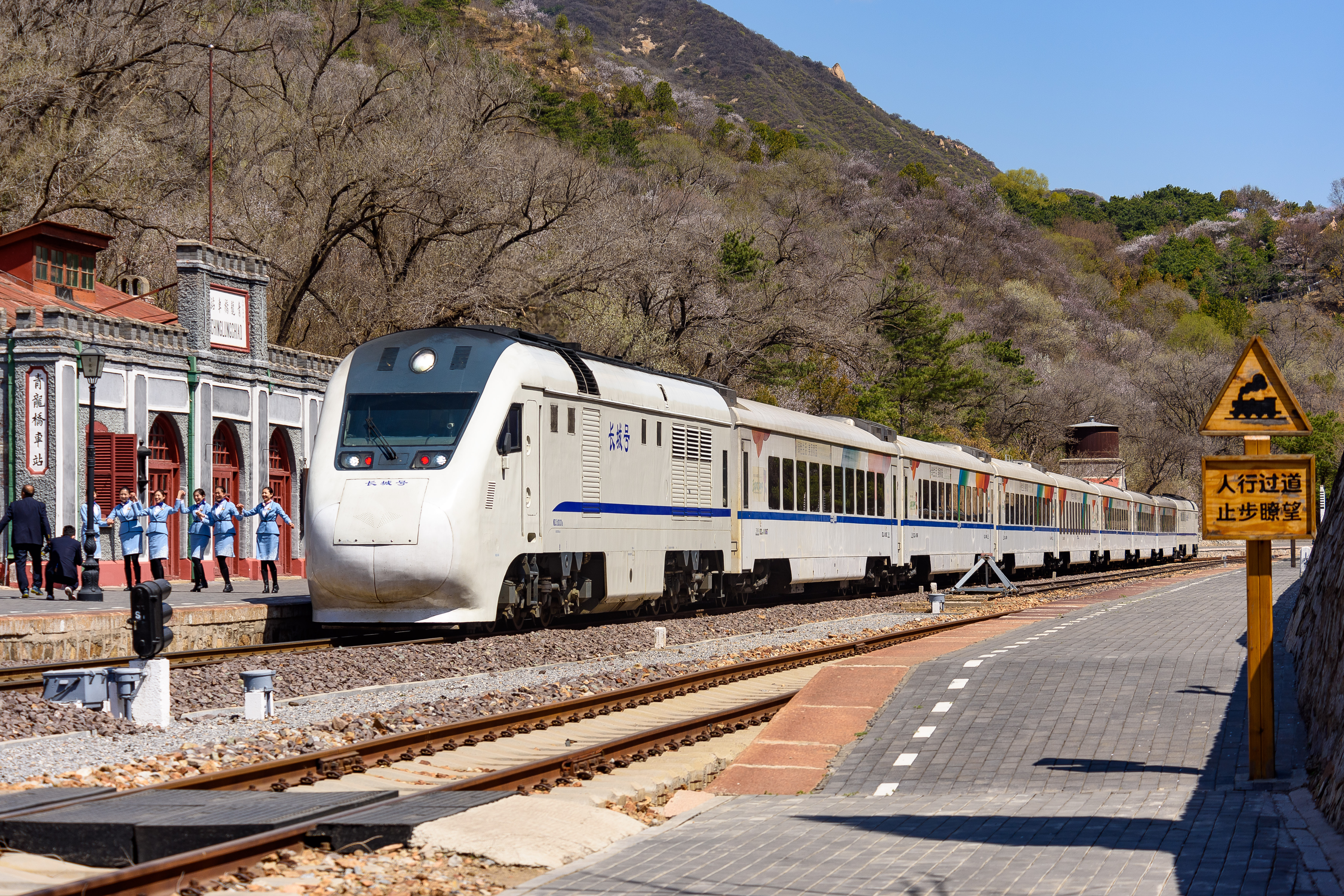
Qinglongqiao station operating in 2022

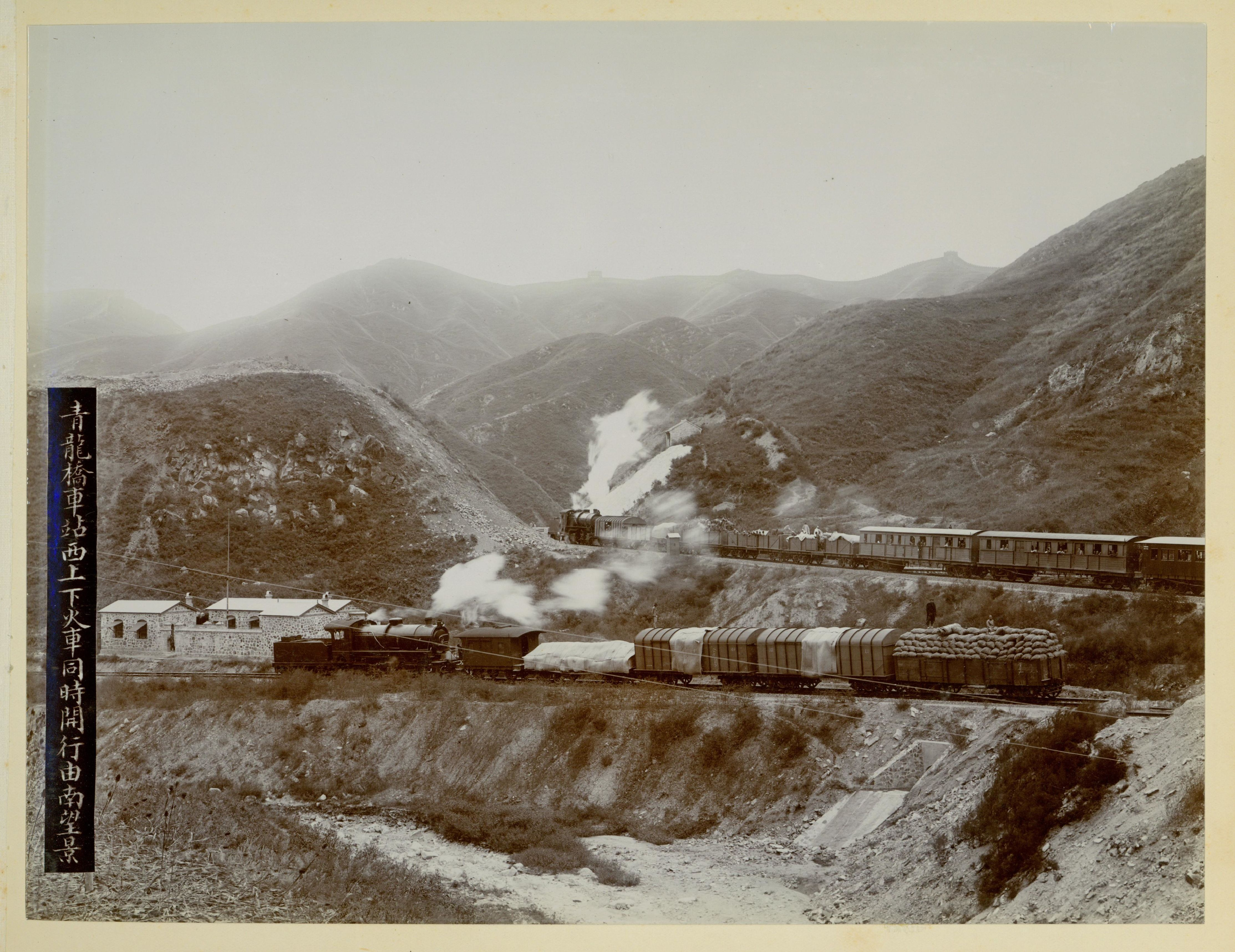
Zig-zag railway design at Qinglongqiao

== See also ==
- Qinglongqiao West railway station
- Badaling railway station
- Badaling Great Wall railway station
- List of stations on Jingbao railway
